= Malcolm Jones =

Malcolm Jones may refer to:

- Malcolm Jones (automobile), American automobile manufactured in Detroit from 1914 to 1915
- Malcolm Jones III (1959–1996), American comic book artist
- Malcolm Jones (musician), musician with Runrig
- Malcolm Jones (politician) (born 1946), former Australian politician
- Malcolm Jones (American football) (born 1992), American football running back
- R. Malcolm Jones, American music video and film director
