= Baby Moose (cyclecar) =

Defunct American motor vehicle manufacturer

The Baby Moose was an American cyclecar produced in St. Paul, Minnesota.

The car was originally called the Continental. It was then changed to Baby Moose, and made by the Bull Moose-Cutting Automobile Company. It had a 4-cylinder engine and two seats. The price was US$360. Production ceased in 1915.

== Models ==
Engine	HP	wheelbase
4-cylinder	N/A	92 in (2,337 mm)
