= Projecta =

The Projecta was an English automobile manufactured only in 1914 at the Percival White Engineering Works, Highbury, London. A monocoque-bodied two seat cyclecar, it was powered by a vee-twin JAP engine with two speed gearbox and belt drive to the rear wheels.
