= Hill & Stanier =

The Hill & Stanier was an English automobile manufactured only in 1914 by R Hill, Stanier and Company in Newcastle-upon-Tyne. It was a six-horsepower cyclecar with a V twin, air-cooled engine. Drive was to the rear wheels by belt to a countershaft and then by chain to the wheels.
