= Skeoch =

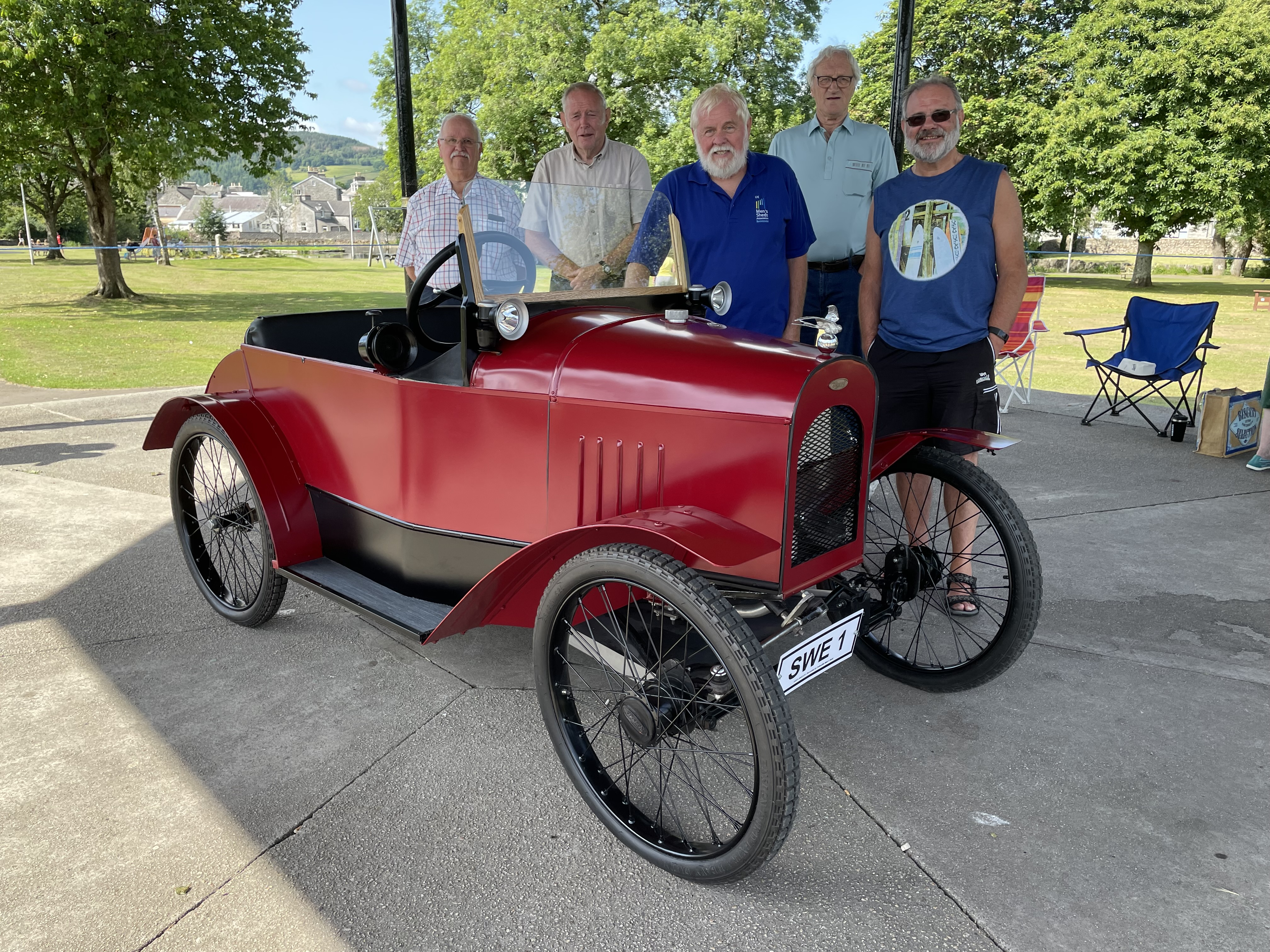
Skeoch Scottish Cyclecar replica constructed by Dalbeattie Men's Shed at the reveal weekend in Dalbeattie 18 July 2021

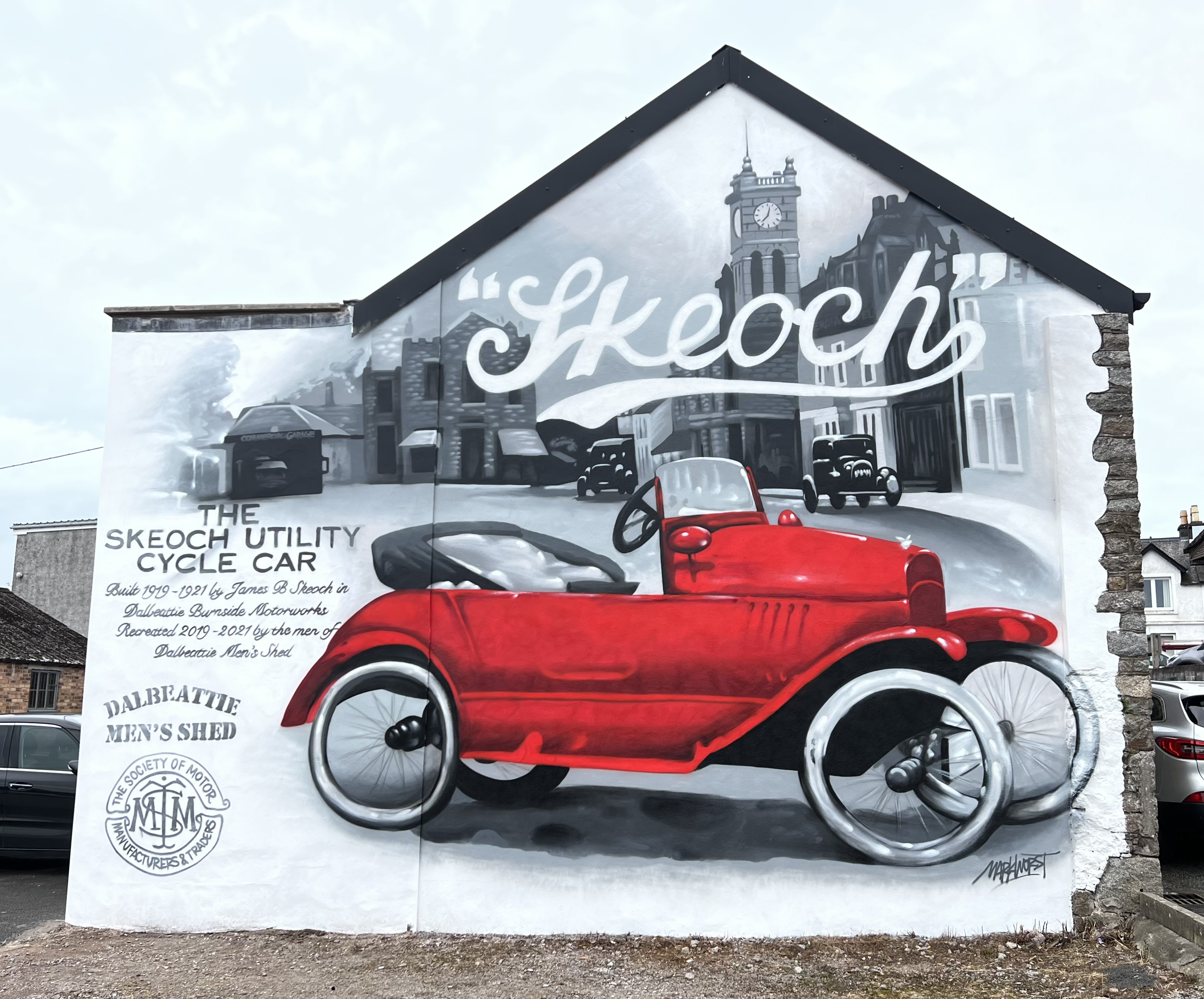
Skeoch Scottish Cyclecar memorial wall art at factory site in Dalbeattie

The Skeoch was a Scottish cyclecar manufactured in 1921 by Skeoch Utility Car Company in Dalbeattie, Kirkudbrightshire. It was powered by a 348 cc single-cylinder Precision engine and was fitted with a two-speed Burman gearbox with chain for its final-drive. At the Scottish Motor Show in 1921, the first Skeoch Utility Car was the cheapest on display and sold for £180 complete, or at a reduced cost of £165 without accessories. Around 10 were manufactured before the factory "The Burnside Motor Works" was destroyed by fire in December 1921.

On Saturday 17 July 2021 a recreation of the car was revealed at Colliston Park, Dalbeattie. The fully operative replica had been constructed by members of Dalbeattie Men's Shed charity and built from the original plans which had been offered from Fiona Sinclair, granddaughter of James Baird Skeoch who died in 1954. As few of these cars were made this is now the only known physical example of the Skeoch cyclecar.

== See also ==
- List of car manufacturers of the United Kingdom
