= HCE (car) =

Overview
- Manufacturer: HCE Cars; Easycar Company
- Production: 1912–1913

Body and chassis
- Class: Cyclecar
- Body style: Various

Powertrain
- Engine: Buckingham single cylinder
- Transmission: Chain and belt drive

The HCE was a British four-wheeled cyclecar manufactured in 1912 and 1913. It was originally made by H.C.E. Cars of London SW, and later by the Easycar Company at a 30-acre (120,000 m^{2}) site with test track in Harold Wood, then in Essex.

The car used a single cylinder Buckingham engine with a tax rating of 6/8 hp driving by chain to a two speed gearbox and then by belt to the rear wheels.

A range of body styles were advertised, including four-seaters. In 1913, four-wheel brakes were fitted, which was unusual for the time.
