= Ajams =

French cyclecar

The Ajams was a French automobile, built in Neuilly by M. Ajams in 1920. A light cyclecar, it had a tubular frame in the "birdcage" style. Its engine was a 1093 cc water-cooled twin-cylinder 9hp unit with a three-speed gearbox. It also had independent suspension for all for wheels.

== See also ==
- cyclecar
