= Autotrix =

The Autotrix was a British three-wheeled cyclecar manufactured by Edmunds, Wadden & Co in Weybridge, Surrey between 1911 and 1914.

A review of the 1912 Motor Cycle and Cycle Car Show at Olympia reported that the car had undergone several improvements since it was shown at the 1911 show, particularly in the area of the rear suspension, and overall it bore little resemblance to its predecessor. They stated that "it would be difficult to point out a more promising three-wheeler for touring purposes, especially from the point of view of comfort, in the whole of the exhibits". Three models were available; 6 hp and 8 hp air-cooled versions, and an 8 hp water-cooled version.
