= Armstrong (cyclecar) =

Overview
- Manufacturer: Armstrong Motor Company
- Production: 1913–1914

Body and chassis
- Class: cyclecar

Powertrain
- Engine: 961 cc single-cylinder V twin

Dimensions
- Wheelbase: 87 inches (2210 mm)
- Length: 120 inches (3050 mm)
- Width: 58 inches (1473 mm)

Chronology
- Successor: none

The Armstrong was a British 4-wheeled cyclecar made in 1913 by the Armstrong Motor Company of Birmingham.

The car was available with a choice of air- or water-cooled, two-cylinder 8 hp engines made by Precision. The cheaper air-cooled version had belt drive to the rear axle, but the dearer water-cooled model had shaft drive.

The number made is not known.

== See also ==
- List of car manufacturers of the United Kingdom
