= PDA (cyclecar) =

Pickering, Darby and Allday Ltd (PDA), was a British automobile manufacturer from 1912 to 1913. They built the PDA Cyclecar at their works in Birmingham, equipped with V2-engines from various manufacturers. Approximately 15 units were built.
