= Bantam (car) =

The Bantam was a British cyclecar manufactured by Slack and Harrison in Kegworth, Leicestershire in 1913.

It was powered by an 8 hp V-twin engine made by Precision. There was no gearbox, and variation in transmission ratios was provided for by variable pulleys. Final drive was by chain.
