= Simplic =

Brass era cyclecar

The Simplic was a cyclecar manufactured from 1914 to 1923 by George Wadden in Surrey, England. The first Simplic was a 4-wheeled vehicle powered by a 5/6 hp air-cooled JAP engine. Transmission was by epicyclic gear and belt final drive. Production stopped later that year due to World War I.

Wadden redesigned the car at the end of the war, and the Simplic now featured an 8/10 hp JAP engine and twin-speed chain drive. Although selling for only £185, and advertised as "Positively the best value in Cyclecars", production ended in 1923.
