= Coey-Mitchell Automobile Company =

American automobile manufacturer from 1913 to 1917

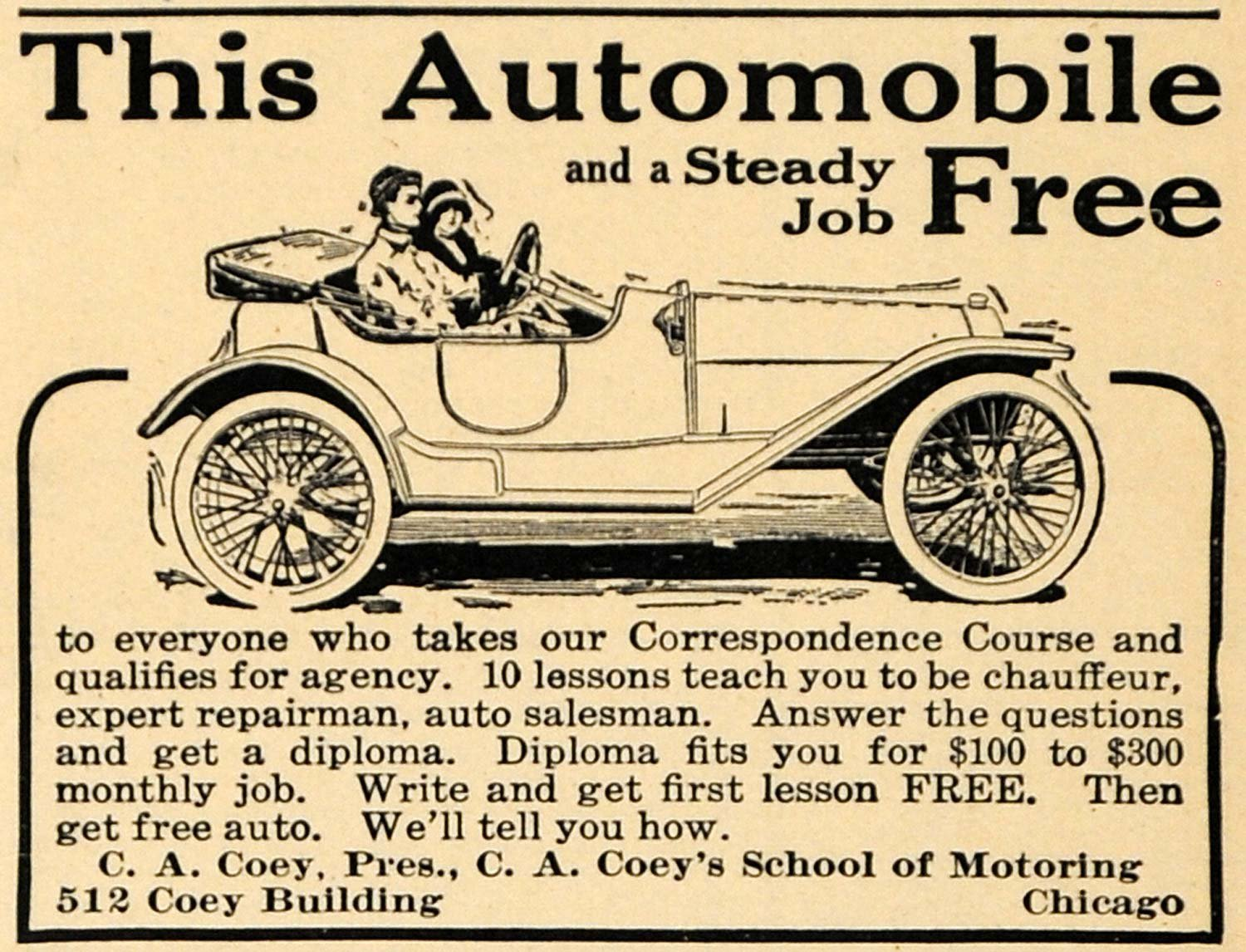
- C.A. Coey's School of Motoring ad
- Company type: Automobile manufacturing
- Industry: Automotive
- Founded: 1913
- Founder: Charles A. Coey
- Defunct: 1917
- Fate: Purchased by Wonder Motor Truck Company
- Headquarters: Chicago, Illinois, United States
- Area served: United States
- Products: Vehicles; Automotive parts
- Services: Driving schools

The Coey-Mitchell Automobile Company was an American automobile manufacturer that built the Coey automobiles and operated a chain of American Driving schools from 1913 to 1917 and was headquartered in Chicago, Illinois. The company was founded under the name Coey-Mitchell Automobile Company by Charles A. Coey.

The company introduced the two-cylinder Coey Junior and Coey Bear with four cylinders, two cyclecars. In addition, they made the four- or six-cylinder sports car Coey Flyer, which was built specifically for Coey's nationwide chain of driving schools. In 1917 Wonder Motor Truck Company bought the Coey Motor Company.

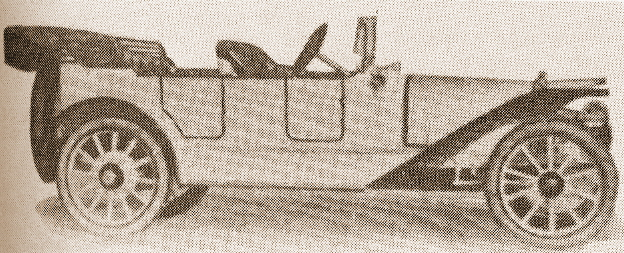
1914 Coey Flyer

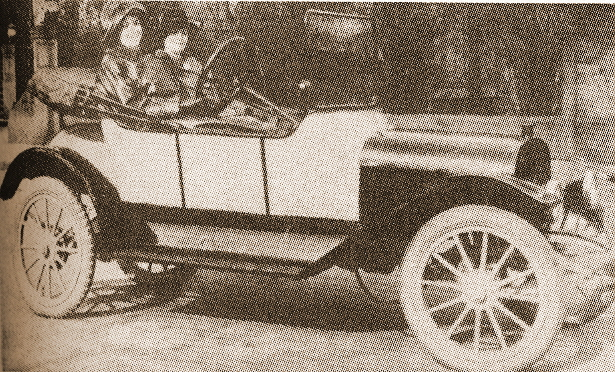
1916 Coey Flyer

== See also ==
- Brass Era car
