= Britannia (cyclecar) =

Overview
- Manufacturer: Britannia Engineering Co. Ltd
- Production: 1913-1914

Body and chassis
- Class: cyclecar

Powertrain
- Engine: two-cylinder, two-stroke
- Transmission: four-speed

Chronology
- Successor: none

The Britannia was a British 4-wheeled cyclecar made in 1913 and 1914 by Britannia Engineering Co. Ltd based in Nottingham.

The car was powered by an air-cooled, two-cylinder, two-stroke engine driving the rear wheels by a four-speed gearbox and belts. It cost GBP85.

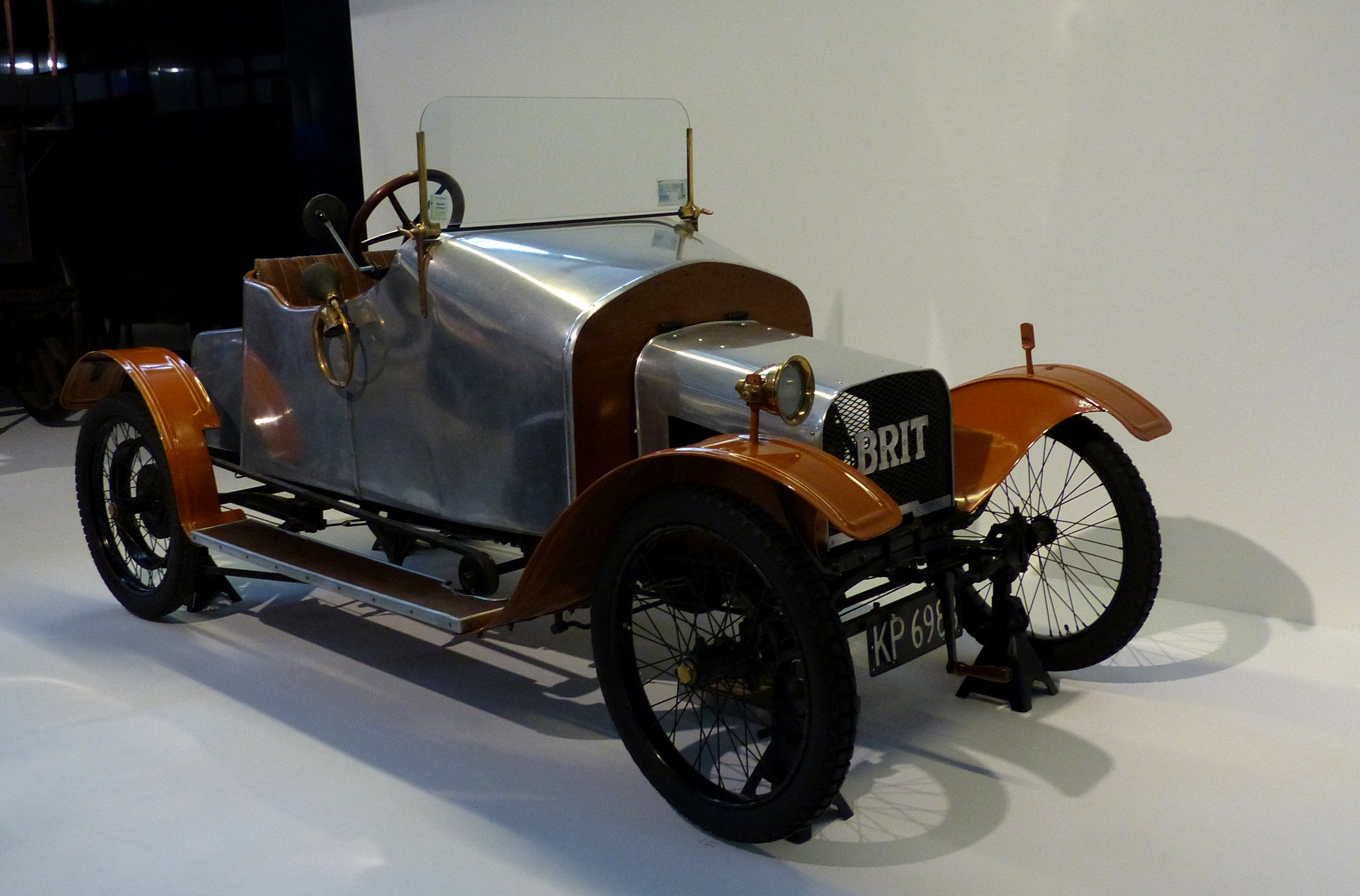
Britannia Cyclecar 1914.

== See also ==
- List of car manufacturers of the United Kingdom
