= Hall (cyclecar) =

Defunct American motor vehicle manufacturer

The Hall Cycle and Plating company was a maker of Cycle cars in Waco, Texas from 1914 to 1915.

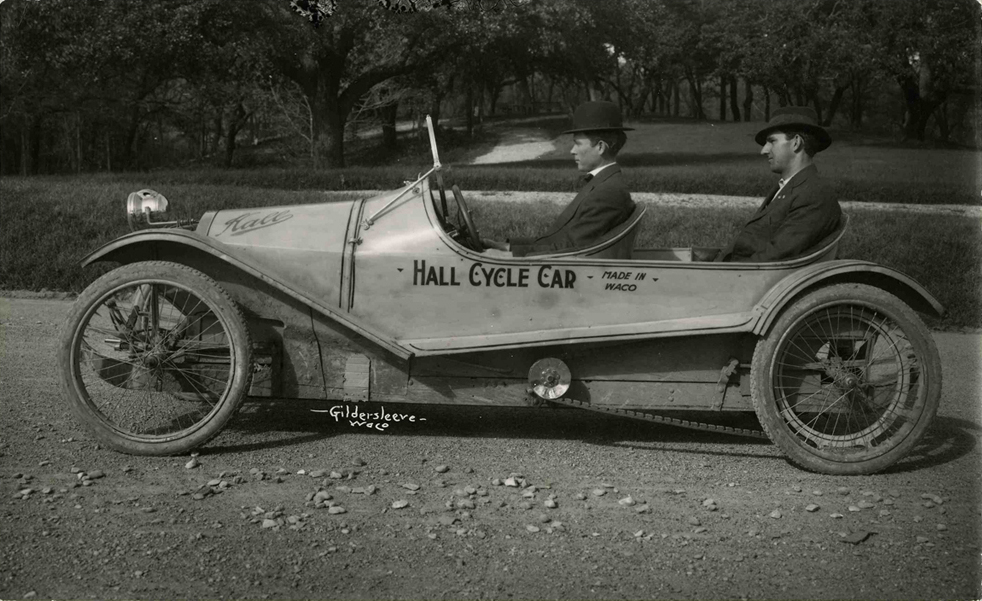
Hall cyclecar 1914

== History ==
In 1914, a man named John B. Fisher designed a cyclecar for the Hall Cycle and Plating Company. It had an underslung frame. Lawrence Hall, president of the company, did a test run from Waco to Dallas, covering 104 miles while consuming only 2.5 gallons of gasoline. The cyclecar had a 4-cylinder, 18 hp engine(the prototype only had a two-cylinder engine) with a 100" wheelbase. The company reorganized in 1915 as the Hall Motor car Company. Production ended in 1915, and Lawrence Hall moved to Los Angeles.
