= Bound (car) =

Overview
- Manufacturer: Bound Brothers
- Production: 1920

Body and chassis
- Class: cyclecar
- Body style: single seat open

Powertrain
- Engine: Precision 3½ hp
- Transmission: infinitely variable friction drive

Dimensions
- Width: 26 inches (660 mm)

Chronology
- Successor: none

The Bound was a British 4 wheeled cyclecar made in 1920 by Bound Brothers of Southampton, England.

The car had single seat bodywork and was very narrow. Power came from a single cylinder Precision engine rated at 3½ horsepower and drive was to the rear wheels via a friction transmission. Very few were made.

== See also ==
- List of car manufacturers of the United Kingdom
