= Arimofa =

The Arimofa was a German automobile manufactured between 1921 and 1922 by Ari Motorfahrzeugbau of Plauen, Vogtland. The name is an acronym from the company's name.

The company began by producing cyclecars with a 12hp Steudel flat-twin engine; these were built in limited numbers before the company turned to building motorcycles. Between 1923 and 1925, the company produced a two-stroke motorcycle.
