= Robertson (cyclecar) =

British cyclecar manufacturer

James Robertson was a British automobile manufacturer from 1915 to 1916 in Manchester. The Robertson Cyclecar had a V-2, twin-cylinder JAP engine rated at 8 bhp (6.0 kW).
