= De Sanzy =

French automobile

The De Sanzy was a French automobile manufactured only in 1924. A product of Paris, it was a cyclecar with a two-stroke single-cylinder 350 cc engine, wooden chassis, and plywood body.
