= Vee Gee =

The Vee Gee was an early British cyclecar made in 1913 only. It got its name from its maker Vernon Gash who was based in Leeds, Yorkshire.

The car seems to have been better engineered than most cyclecars with a tubular metal frame. The 8 hp V-twin JAP engine was air-cooled and had a conventional 3-speed transmission. This was connected to the worm gear final drive by a transmission shaft.

The open bodywork had a single bench seat that was claimed to be wide enough for three people. The selling price was 110 guineas (£115.50). A promised Sports model was probably never produced.

The number made is not known.
