= Cyklonetka =

1939 cyclecar prototype

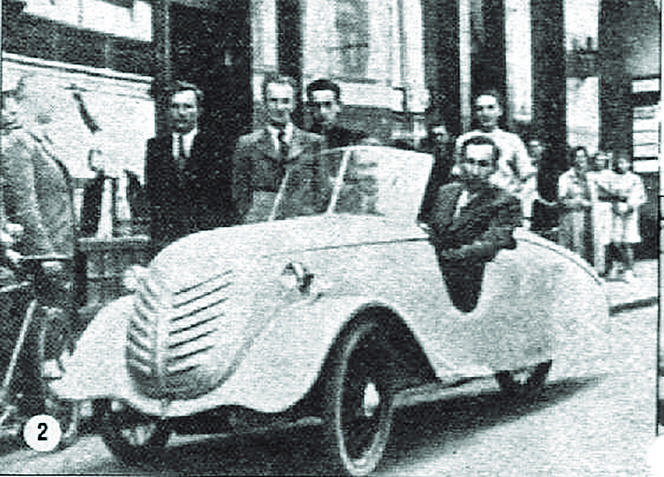
- Cyklonetka and its creators, Eugeniusz Knawe, Jan Knawe, and Wacław Knawe, in Warsaw, Poland, 1939.

Overview
- Production: 1939
- Assembly: Kielce, Poland
- Designer: Eugeniusz Knawe; Jan Knawe; Wacław Knawe

Body and chassis
- Class: Three-wheeler cyclecar
- Body style: Cyclecar

Powertrain
- Engine: 98 cc (6.0 cu in) moped engine

Cyklonetka (Polish: [t͡sɘ̟.klɔˈnɛt.ka]) was a prototype three-wheeler cyclecar designed in 1939 by brothers Eugeniusz, Jan, and Wacław Knawe in their workshop in Kielce, Poland.

== History ==
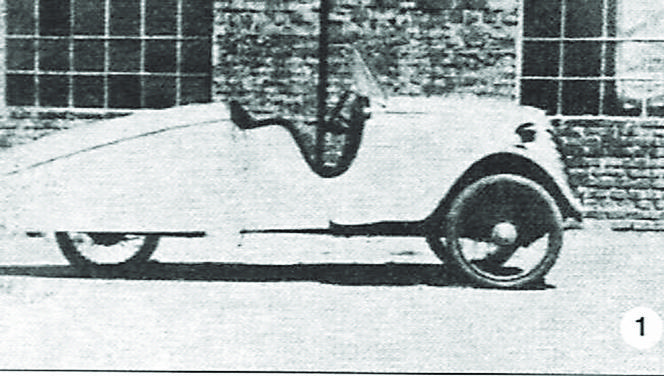
Side view of Cyklonetka

Cyklonetka was designed by a team of brothers: Eugeniusz, Jan, and Wacław Knawe in their workshop in Kielce, Poland. The brothers manufactured all elements of the car, but the engine, in their workshop. The engine was manufactured in the Steinhagen-Stransky factory in Warsaw. In summer of 1939, the brothers had traveled with their car, equipped with the bike registration plate, to Warsaw, where they met with Antoni Roman, the minister of industry and trade, who was impressed with their car, and commented that the vehicle should have car registration plate instead. Soon after that, Nazi Germany had invaded Poland, beginning the World War II, which made it impossible for the future development of the car.

== Specifications ==
The cyclecar was a convertible three-wheeler cyclecar with a 98 cc moped engine, which was manufactured in the Steinhagen-Stransky factory in Warsaw.
