= La Confortable =

Former car manufacturer

The La Confortable was a French cyclecar produced around 1920. The car was quite small, with a single-cylinder two-stroke engine of 344 cc, built by Train.
