= Whitmore Arrow =

Cyclecar from 1914

The Arrow was an American cyclecar marketed as a light car manufactured in Dayton, Ohio by M.C. Whitmore Co in 1914. The Arrow had a four-cylinder, 1 1/2 liter water-cooled engine, and sold for $395.

Model	Engine	HP	Transmission	Wheelbase
Model A (tandem)	2-cylinder	12	2-speed	100 in (254 cm)
Model B (side-by-side)	2-cylinder	12	2-speed	100 in (254 cm)
Model B (light delivery)	2-cylinder	12	2-speed	100 in (254 cm)
