= Dallison =

Overview
- Manufacturer: Dallison Gearing and Motor Co Ltd
- Production: 1913

Body and chassis
- Class: cyclecar

Powertrain
- Engine: Precision V twin-cylinder
- Transmission: five-speed

Chronology
- Successor: none

The Dallison was an English cyclecar made in 1913 only by the Dallison Gearing and Motor Co Ltd based in Birmingham.

The car was powered by a Precision air- or water-cooled, V twin engine driving the rear wheels by, unusually, a five-speed gearbox and worm gear final drive.

It was envisioned to reach a weekly production of 30 or 50 cars a week but it is unlikely that this actually happened.

== See also ==
- List of car manufacturers of the United Kingdom
