= Lambert (cyclecar) =

The Lambert was a British 3-wheeled cyclecar made between 1911 and 1912 by Lambert's Carriage, Cycle and Motor Works of Thetford, Norfolk.

The car was powered by an 8 hp JAP engine mounted at the front and driving the single rear wheel by chain via a three-speed gearbox. It was fitted with an open two seater body, usually painted in green and grey vertical stripes. It was sold as "The Smartest Car on Three Wheels" and cost £110.
