= Warren-Lambert =

British automobile manufacturer

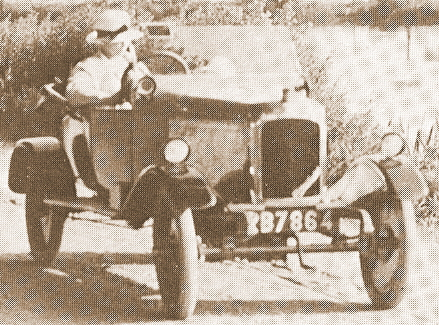
Warren-Lambert 11 hp (1920)

The Warren-Lambert Engineering Co. Ltd. was a British automobile manufacturer that was established from 1912 to 1922 in Richmond, then in Surrey (now part of London). A. Warren Lambert (his name had no hyphen but the car's name did), was an agent for Morgan cars in Putney which he also raced. In 1912 he designed and started to manufacture a two-seat four-wheel cyclecar from premises in Uxbridge Road, Shepherd's Bush. It was well received and around 25 cars a week were being made.

The first car made in 1912 was a two-cylinder cyclecar with an engine made by Precision rated at 9 hp. In 1914 it was replaced by a 1093cc 10 hp four-cylinder Dorman engined model. With the outbreak of World War I car production was discontinued in 1915. Around 200 cars had been made.

After the armistice in 1919 the company moved to Richmond and a new 11 hp model came out with a four-cylinder engine made by Alpha that had a displacement of 1331 cc. Like the pre-war cars it was a two-seater. A three- or four-speed transmission made by Moss was fitted driving the rear wheels but with no differential gear. The chassis had half elliptic leaf springs at the front and quarter elliptic at the rear and the brakes used rather primitive metal shoes. The 65 mph Sports version with a Coventry-Simplex engine of 1498 cc capacity had quarter elliptic leaf springs all round. A Dorman engined model was introduced in 1921 but it is believed that only two were made.

The last cars were made in 1921.

== Models ==
Model	Production	Cylinders	Capacity	Wheelbase
9 hp	1912–1915	2	1095 cm³	2184 mm
10 hp	1914-15	4	1094 cm³	2311 mm
11 hp	1919–1920	4	1331 cm³	2362 mm
11 hp	1919-1921	4	1498 cm³	2362 mm
10 hp	1922	4 R	1496 cm³	2438 mm

== See also ==
- List of car manufacturers of the United Kingdom
