= Gnome (car) =

British model of cyclecar

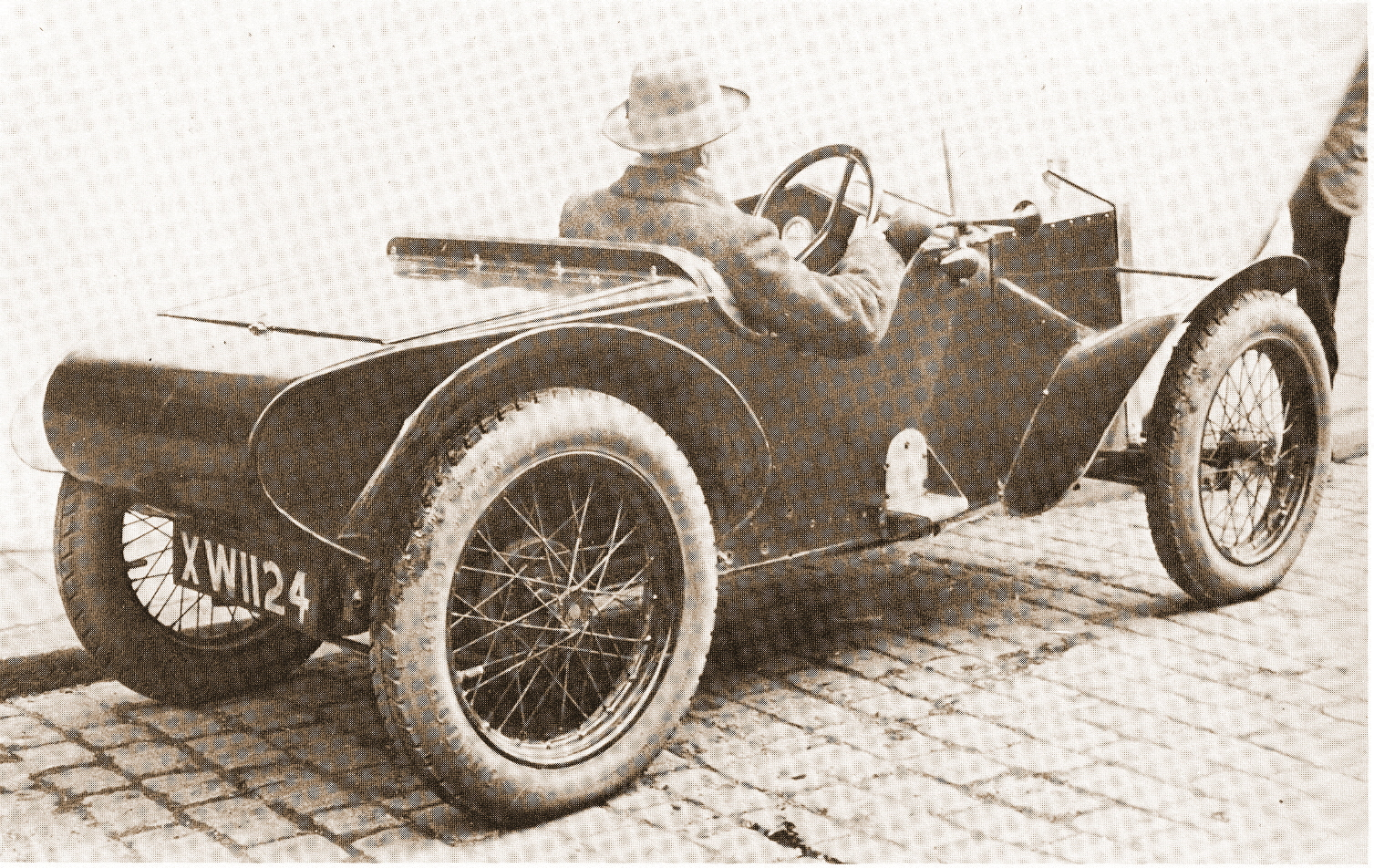

Overview
- Manufacturer: Gnome Cars Ltd, Nomad Cars Ltd
- Production: Less than 100

Body and chassis
- Body style: tourer
- Layout: RR layout

Powertrain
- Engine: 343 cc single cylinder

Dimensions
- Wheelbase: 80 in (2,032 mm)
- Length: 113 in (2,870 mm)
- Width: 52 in (1,321 mm)

The Gnome was a British cyclecar built in London by Gnome Cars Ltd, Elysium Place, London SW6 It was produced from 1925 until 1926.

Power was provided by a single cylinder, air cooled, two stroke engine, 343 cc Villiers engine mounted at the rear of the car and driving the rear wheels through a Friction drive arranged to give four forward ratios and reverse.

The car had a combined body and chassis made of steel and plywood and could seat two. The front bonnet could be removed to reveal a luggage compartment. An unusual feature was the lack of any suspension, the only springing was provided by inflating the tyres to only 6 psi (0.41 bar).

The cars were priced at £75.

In 1926 the name was changed to Nomad, the price increased to £100 and an electric starter was fitted.

It is not known how many were made but it is thought production was around 30 cars under both names. The last ones were made in 1926
