= Hawk (cyclecar) =

Defunct American motor vehicle manufacturer

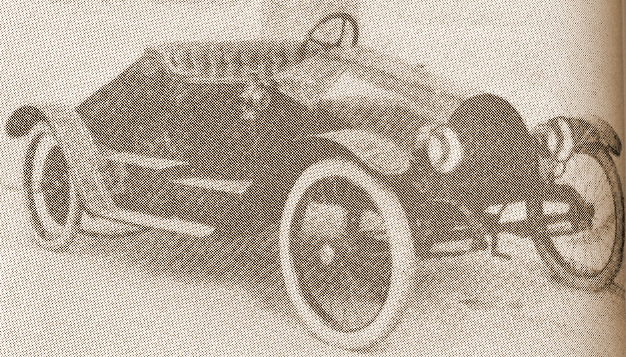
MHV Hawk Cyclecar 1914

The Hawk was an American cyclecar built in Detroit, Michigan by the Hawk Cyclecar Company in 1914. The Hawk was belt-driven with a 9/13 hp V-twin engine. The vehicle was advertised for $390, and could seat two passengers side-by-side. It had a distinctive sloping bonnet line.
