= Lecoy =

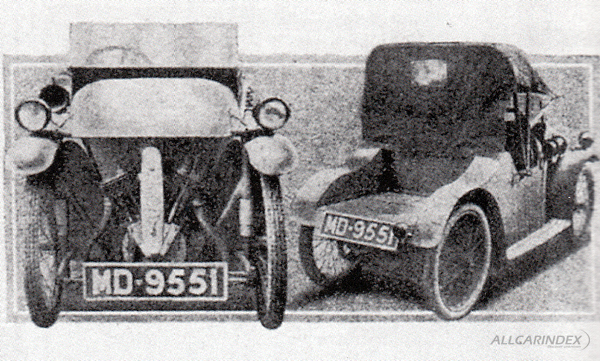
- Lecoy in 1921.

Overview
- Manufacturer: Lambert Engineering Co Ltd
- Production: 1921–1922

Body and chassis
- Class: cyclecar
- Body style: two seat open

Powertrain
- Engine: Blackburne or JAP
- Transmission: friction drive

Dimensions
- Wheelbase: 75 in (1,905 mm)

The Lecoy was a short lived British 4-wheeled cyclecar made from 1921 to 1922 by the Lambert Engineering Co Ltd, St Hilda's Works, Northolt Road, Harrow, Middlesex.

The car had a 984 cc Blackburne 8 hp V-Twin engine with a JAP as an alternative. A friction drive transmission was used driving the rear axle via a chain drive. Unusually for the time it had coil spring front suspension but used cantilever leaf springs at the rear.

The air-cooled engine was exposed at the front of the car with no attempt at a dummy radiator. The coachwork was a two-seat open body with an open platform for stowing luggage in the open at the rear. The standard body colour was buff brown. Wire spoked wheels with 650x65 tyres were fitted.

The car sold for £185. The number made is not known.
