= Villard (automaker) =

Société des Automobiles Villard
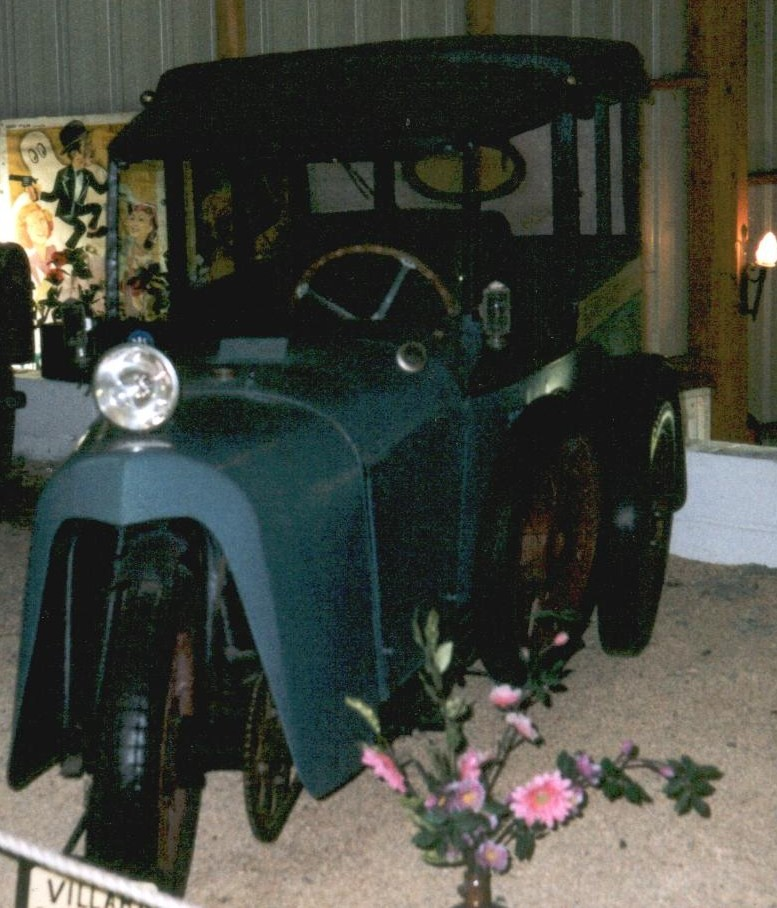
- Founded: 1925
- Defunct: 1935
- Headquarters: Janville, France
- Products: Automobiles; Cyclecars

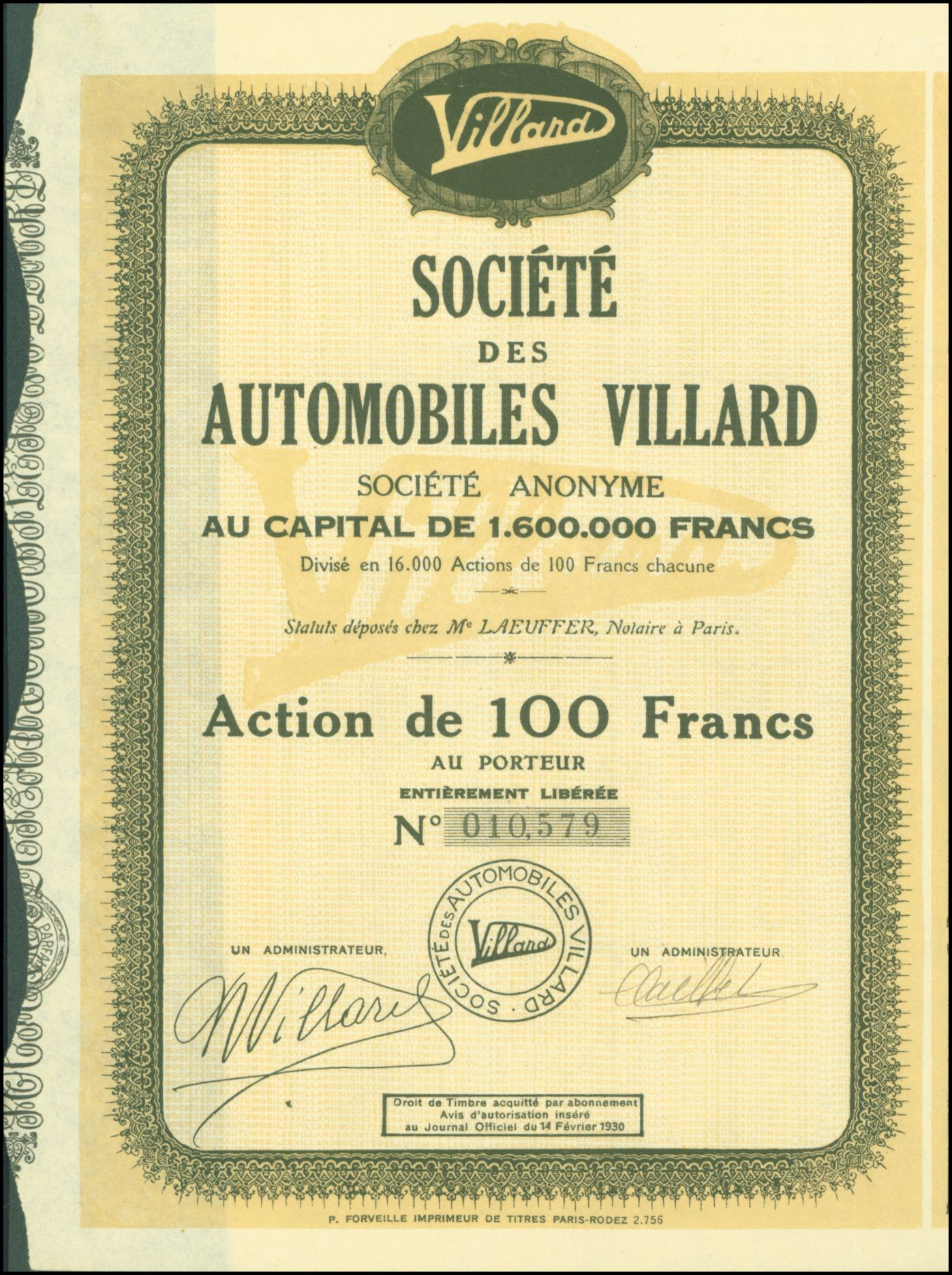
Share of the Société des Automobiles Villard, issued 14. February 1930

Villard was a French automobile manufacturer between 1925 and 1935.

== Beginnings ==
The first 4HP Villard was constructed in 1923. It appeared to be a late-comer to the Cyclecar boom that had followed the First World War. It had only three wheels, with the single wheel, at the front, providing both the traction and the steering. The wheelbase was of 1,850 mm (72.8 in) and the two-stroke engine of 345cc.

== Launch ==
The car made its public debut in October 1924 at the 19th Paris Motor Show, priced by the manufacturer at 4,950 francs. In 1925 the Société des Automobiles Villard was registered.

== Middle period ==
Four years later the vehicle on the show stand at Paris was again a three wheel cycle car with a 1,850 mm (72.8 in) wheelbase and a single cylinder two-stroke engine, but the engine capacity was now given as 350cc. Many of these little three-wheeler cyclecars used bodies adapted for use as small delivery vans.

== Later years ==
In 1927 a small number of four wheeled cars were produced: these used a chain drive to deliver power to the front wheels. Now a 500cc V4-cylinder was also available.

== Reading list ==
- Harald Linz, Halwart Schrader: Die Internationale Automobil-Enzyklopädie. United Soft Media Verlag, München 2008, ISBN 978-3-8032-9876-8. (German)
- George Nick Georgano (Chefredakteur): The Beaulieu Encyclopedia of the Automobile. Volume 2: G–O. Fitzroy Dearborn Publishers, Chicago 2001, ISBN 1-57958-293-1. (Englich)
- George Nick Georgano: Autos. Encyclopédie complète. 1885 à nos jours. Courtille, Paris 1975. (French)
