= Broadway (cyclecar) =

Overview
- Manufacturer: Broadway Cyclecar Co
- Production: 1913

Body and chassis
- Class: Cyclecar

Powertrain
- Engine: Fafnir V-twin air-cooled
- Transmission: Two-speed

Chronology
- Successor: None

The Broadway was a British 4-wheeled cyclecar made only in 1913 by the Broadway Cyclecar Co of Coventry. The Broadway Cyclecar Co. was founded by John Twigg and his son Ernest Twigg. Both John and Ernest were originally carpenters and builders before getting into auto-motives. They made their break into the scene after Ernest created a patent for "electric Sparking plugs".

The car was powered by an air-cooled, V-twin engine, made by Fafnir driving the rear wheels by a two-speed gearbox and belts. It cost GBP80. The engine for this car was German-build and it was said that the design of the car was roomy. The Broadway wasn't as popular as many thought it would be and it was said that only a few were sold.

== See also ==
- List of car manufacturers of the United Kingdom
