= Jouvie =

The Jouvie was a French JAP-engine cyclecar manufactured in Paris from 1913 to 1914.
