= Duocar =

Duocars Ltd of 70 York Street, London was a maker of cycle cars founded in 1910. The cars were built in Alpha Street, Deptford, London. The company was founded by Mr L.F. de Peyrecave.

The name Duocar is easily confused with the generic name 'duocar' used at the time to refer to two seater cycle cars (single seaters being called 'monocars'), and possibly for this reason the Duocars are sometimes referred to as Duo cars, Duo cyclecars, or Duo cycle cars. Mr de Peyrecave was quite successful in promoting his cars, getting four of them on the front cover of the first edition of The Cyclecar magazine in November 1912.

The Duocar was also reviewed in the Forgotten Makes series of Motor Sport magazine in 1994, which noted some of the many records held by the Duo (notably those gained at Brooklands in October 1912), and the endurance events in which the Duo competed.

The Duocar was described at the 1912 Motor Cycle and Cycle Car Show, with a JAP 8 hp V-twin providing the power, with fan assisted cooling. A large diameter external flywheel was fitted to smooth the engine which was fed by a Lukin carburettor operated by an accelerator pedal. The steering had a cable and worm drive. It used Hans Renold chain drive to the countershaft, and the drive to the rear wheels was by 1.125inch armoured V-belts. Gearing was provided by expanding pulleys to the back axle, with the back axle moving to ensure no slack in the drive belts.

From 1913 the Duo was available with an extra chain driven countershaft with two gears and dog clutches before the drive went to the variable pulley arrangement, so that gear ratios extended from 4:1 to 16:1. The price went up with the change from 97 guineas to 106 guineas. In the Cyclecar Club's fuel economy competition the three Duos equipped with Lukin, Stewart-Precision and Solex carburettors recorded fuel consumptions of 40.3, 50.7 and 53.1 miles per gallon respectively.

Mr de Peyrecave also launched the "De P" range of light cars featuring a variety of four cylinder engines.

== See also ==
- Cyclecar
