= Athmac =

The Athmac was a short-lived English cyclecar which was manufactured by Athmac Motor Company of Leyton, then in Essex (now part of Greater London) in 1913. The friction-driven car, named 10/12, was propelled by a 1,110 cc four-cylinder engine. It featured final drive by long belts to the rear axle and was supposed to sell at 120 guineas, but production never got off the ground.
