= Zendik =

Overview
- Manufacturer: Zendik Cars, Thames street, Kingston upon Thames
- Production: 1912–1913
- Designer: Harold Birdsall Bullingham

Body and chassis
- Class: Cyclecar
- Body style: two seat open

Powertrain
- Engine: V-twin Chater-Lea
- Transmission: 2-speed manual

Dimensions
- Curb weight: 700 lb (318 kg)

The Zendik was a British cyclecar designed by Harold Birdsall Bullingham (1879–1952) and made by Zendik Cars Ltd of Thames Street, Kingston upon Thames, Surrey, England in 1912 and 1913. They had a sales office and showroom run by H Jenks at Ebury Street, Eaton Square, London SW.

The car had an air-cooled 8 hp V-twin cylinder Chater-Lea engine driving the rear wheels through a two speed transmission with top gear being direct and the lower gear a chain reduction system. Reverse gear was obtained by diverting the drive through two friction wheels, one on the front of the propeller shaft and a larger one connected to the low gear countershaft in the transmission. The footbrake operated on the rear wheels with internal expanding shoes and the handbrake controlled a leather faced band contracting onto the main drive shaft. The final drive to the rear axle used a worm drive reduction system.

The chassis was wood with metal reinforcing and semi-elliptic springs were fitted to front and rear axles. Wire spoked wheels with 26 x 2.5 tyres were fitted.

The car was provided with two-seat coachwork with a dummy radiator with a Zendik script across it. The body changed little throughout the life of the company. An updated version was announced in 1913 but probably never reached production. At least one chassis was fitted with a van body and supplied to Gaydon & Sons, a Kingston-based clockmaker.

A top speed of 45 mph (72 km/h) was claimed in Zendik's own advertising and was backed up in a road test published in The Cyclemotor magazine in March 1913.

The car was sold for £110 with a hood and windscreen available for an extra £10. It is not known how many Zendiks were made but the premises seem to have been very small and the company had a nominal capital of only £3000. They did however have a telephone installed, not particularly common in 1912. The end came in December 1913 when the company seems to have run out of money and at an Extraordinary General Meeting a liquidator was appointed. The company was wound up in June 1914.

== See also ==
- List of car manufacturers of the United Kingdom
