= JG Sport =

The JG Sport was a French automobile manufactured from 1922 until 1923.

A cyclecar built by one M. Janvier, it had a 970 cc Ruby engine and chain drive.
