= Santax =

1920s French automobile

The Santax was a French automobile manufactured by Cyclecars Le Santax of Paris from 1920 until 1927. It was a small cyclecar built with Anzani single-cylinder engines of 125 cc and got its name from being free of tax due to its small engine.

A larger 500 cc model followed in 1926.
