= Day-Leeds =

British automobile company

The Day-Leeds was a British automobile manufactured by Job Day & Sons of Leeds, Yorkshire.

William Henry Day was a chartered accountant who in 1886 set up as a manufacturing chemist. With his brothers Albert and Charles they set up the company of Job Day & Sons making engines designed by William Henry and under Albert packaging machinery. It was named after their father Job Day, a Lincolnshire farmer.

In 1912 they made their first car, a cyclecar powered by an air cooled 998 cc V-twin engine which they built themselves. The tubular steel chassis had half-elliptic springs all round. Drive was to the rear axle through a cone clutch, three speed gearbox with differential and finally a belt or chain to each rear wheel. A top speed of 50 mph (80 km/h) was claimed. The bodywork was open with two seats and acetylene lighting at the front and a single oil light at the rear. The basic car cost £110 or £120 with windscreen, hood, lights and horn. It was no longer being advertised in 1913 so production may have ceased.

As well as cars a range of motor cycles was also offered with a 499cc single cylinder engine.

For 1914 a completely new and more conventional light car was shown at the 1913 London Motor Show with a four-cylinder 1130 cc engine made by Turner but this was soon replaced by a 1286 cc water cooled side valve engine made by themselves. The engine was designed by W L Adams of the Laxtonia Engineering Works of Peterborough who also designed a World War I aero engine. The car had semi elliptic leaf springs, rear wheel only brakes and a wheelbase of 7 feet 9 inches (2,360 mm) and a track of 3 feet 9 inches (1,140 mm). Drive was to the rear axle through a cone clutch, separate three speed gearbox and torque tube.

The model was revived after World War I with electric lighting now fitted. Body types included a two-seat open car and a coupe made by nearby company Lockwood and Clarkson. The price quoted on the UK market in 1919 was £400 for the open two seater and this seems to have been uncompetitive as the price was progressively reduced to £225 when production ceased in 1926. It is thought that around 300 cars were made in the post war period.

Only two cars are thought to survive, one in England and the other in Australia showing that some cars were exported.

Production of packing machinery continued with the company being absorbed by the Baker Perkins company.

== Models ==
Model	Years	Cylinders	Capacity	Wheelbase	Weight
8.9	1912–1913	V-twin	998 cc		5.5 cwt (280 kg)
10	1914 1919-24	four	1286 cc	7 ft 9 in (2362 mm)	14.5 cwt (710 kg)
