= Wilbrook =

English automobile

The Wilbrook was an English automobile manufactured only in 1913 by Brooks and Spencer in Levenshulme, Manchester. A four-seater cyclecar, it featured a 9 hp JAP V-twin engine and four-wheel brakes.
