= Trumbull (cyclecar) =

Defunct American motor vehicle manufacturer

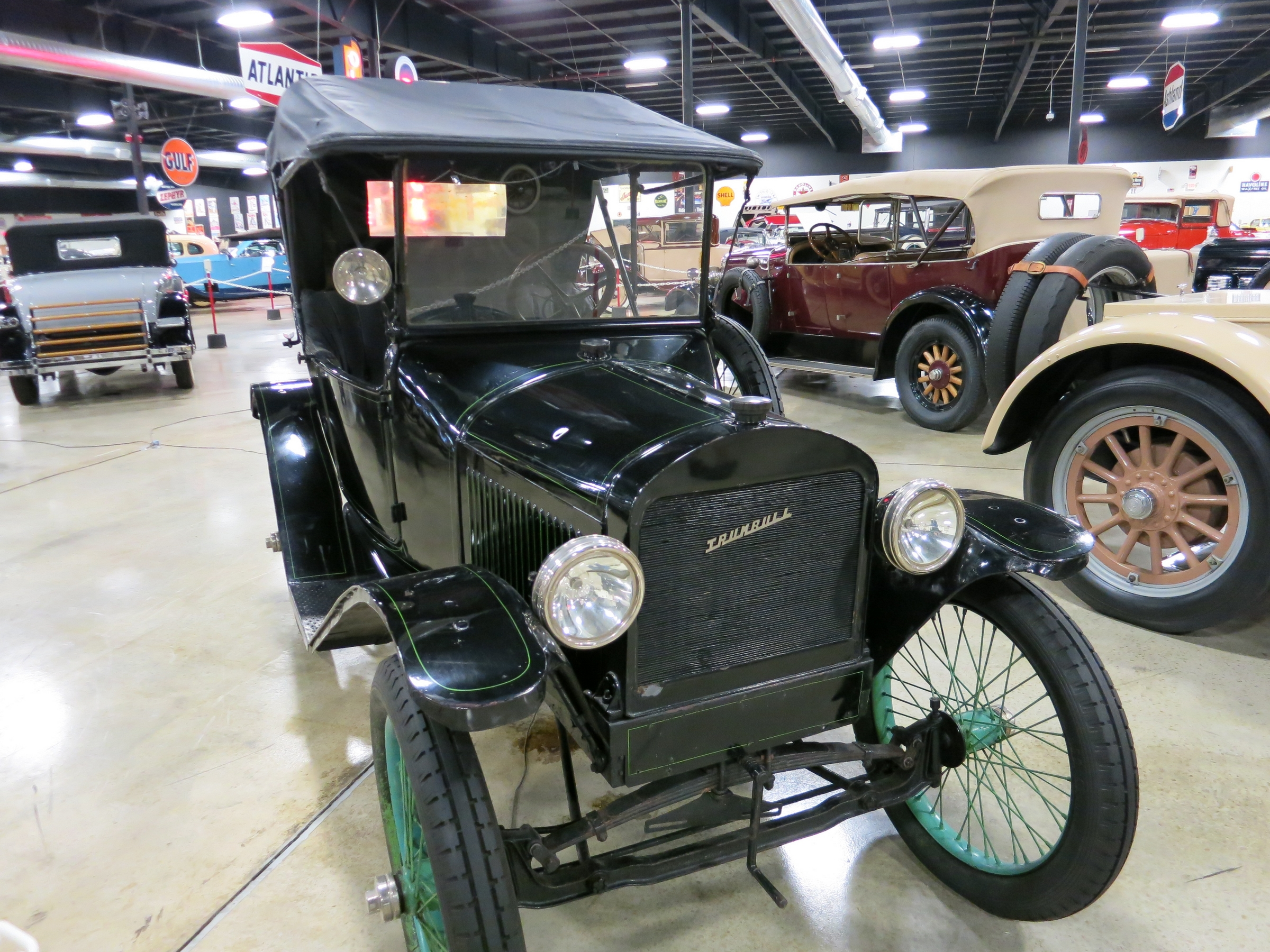
1915 Trumbull

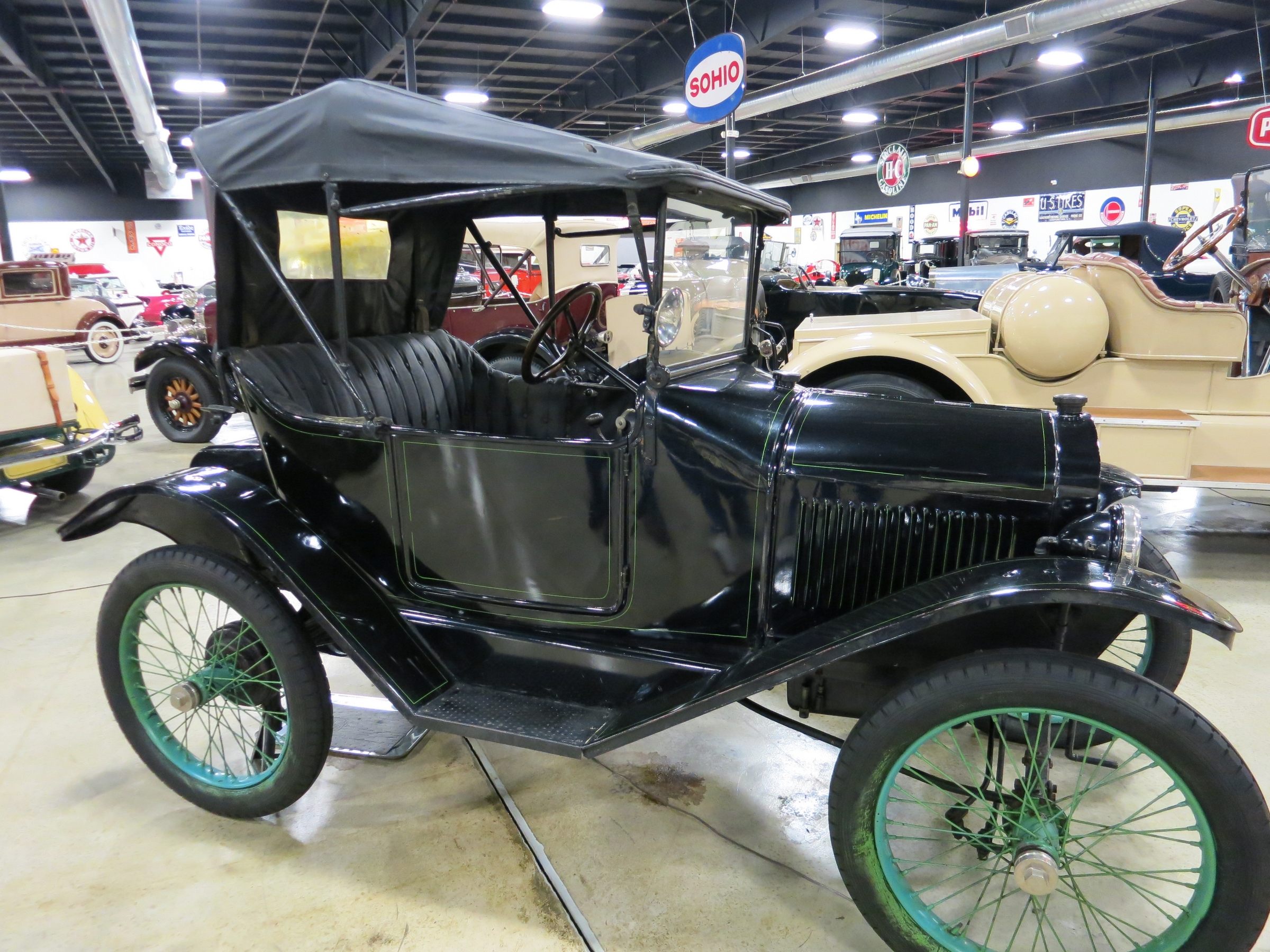

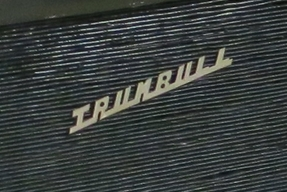

The Trumbull was a short-lived make of cyclecar manufactured in Bridgeport, Connecticut by the Trumbull Motorcar Company. About 2000 Trumbull cars were produced between 1913 and 1915. After the death of Isaac Trumbull on the RMS Lusitania, the company ceased production.

== Company history ==
The origins of the Trumbull Motor Company lie in a car designed in 1912 by Harry Stoops and intended to be produced by the Americal Cyclecar Company, but the design was acquired in 1913 by Alexander and Isaac Trumbull before any cars had been manufactured. The Trumbull Motorcar Company was thus founded and in 1914 produced and sold a selection vehicles with a top speed of 50 miles per hour (80 km/h). Trumbulls were powered by a four-cylinder water-cooled engine producing in the range of 14 horsepower (10 kW) to 18 horsepower (13 kW), and were available in a variety of bodies including roadster, coupe and delivery truck. In 1915 the chain-drive system was replaced by a more familiar direct drive through a gearbox.

A total of approximately 2000 Trumbull cars were produced, of which three quarters were exported, mainly to Europe and Australia. The sole importer in England was A.I. Greenwood of Leeds and in 1914 the roadster retailed at £105 in England and $425 in the US. The New York Police Department were also early users of Trumbulls, with upwards of 20 vehicles.

== Rapid collapse ==
With production ramped up to 300 cars per month, on 1 May 1915 company president Isaac Trumbull boarded the RMS Lusitania for a visit to Europe. Also on board were 20 Trumbull cars and expectations were buoyant with sales of up to 300 cars being anticipated as a result of the trip. On 7 May the Lusitania was torpedoed off the coast of Ireland, with Issac Trumbull being one of more than 1000 lives lost. Almost immediately Trumbull's brothers vowed to convert manufacturing effort to munitions for use against World War 1 Germany, and in November of that year the Trumbull Motor Company was wound up.
