= Le Roitelet =

The Le Roitelet was a French automobile manufactured in Paris from 1921 to 1924. A front wheel drive cyclecar, it had a twin-cylinder 749 cc engine.
