= Willis (cyclecar) =

Willis was a British automobile marque that began and ended in 1913. It was manufactured by Finchley Place Garage in London.

The only model was a cyclecar. The car had a V-twin engine from JA Prestwich Industries delivering 8 bhp (6.0 kW).

== Bibliography ==
- Harald Linz & Halwart Schrader: Die Internationale Automobil-Enzyklopädie. United Soft Media Verlag GmbH, Munich 2008, ISBN 978-3-8032-9876-8
- Nick Georgano: The Beaulieu Encyclopedia of the Automobile, Volume 3 P–Z. Fitzroy Dearborn Publishers, Chicago 2001, ISBN 1-57958-293-1 (englisch)
- David Culshaw & Peter Horrobin: The Complete Catalogue of British Cars 1895-1975. Veloce Publishing plc. Dorchester (1997). ISBN 1-874105-93-6
