= Vaillant (automobile) =

The Vaillant was a French automobile built in Lyon from 1922 to 1924. It was a cyclecar which used a Chapuis-Dornier engine of either 961 cc or 1350 cc.
