= Virus (automobile) =

The Virus was a French automobile.

Pierre Brissonnet was the owner of the Garage Renouvier in the Rue de Renouvier in Paris. He built cyclecars between 1930 and 1935. Designer of the cars was a certain Renaud. The cars had front-wheel drive and a two-stroke engine with 350 cc. The cars raced at the Bol d'Or.
