= JPL (cyclecar) =

Defunct American motor vehicle manufacturer

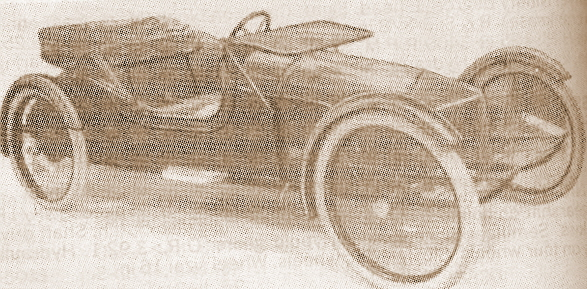
1914 La Vigne Cyclecar (original design)

The JPL was a brass era cyclecar built in Detroit, Michigan by the J.P.L. Cyclecar Company, formed in 1913. Production started in December 1913 but ended in 1914.

== History ==
The JPL was designed by J.P. La Vigne who was an early and ubiquitous engineer in the industry. The car was marketed both as the JPL and the La Vigne. The cyclecar was equipped with a four-cylinder air-cooled engine with a sliding-gear transmission. A bore and stroke of 2 3/4 and 4 in (69.9 and 101.6 mm) made for a displacement of 95.0 cu in (1,557 cc) and a claimed maximum power of 14 hp (10.4 kW). The underslung design made for a particularly low profile. The vehicle was claimed to get 30–40 mpg_{‑US} (7.8–5.9 L/100 km; 36–48 mpg_{‑imp}) and have a top speed of 50 mph (80 km/h). The original model was available either as a roadster, a cabriolet, or a delivery wagon.

A revised design, the Model F, was shown in mid-1914 with a promised introduction date of September 1914. The engine, while of the same size, was now water-cooled and produced 20 hp (14.9 kW), while the wheelbase was increased from 96 to 100 in (2,440 to 2,540 mm). Production however ceased by the end of the year.
