= Lester Solus =

The Lester Solus was an English automobile built in Shepherd's Bush, London only in 1913. A single-seat cyclecar, it ran on an 8 hp JAP or Precision V-twin engine with friction drive and belts to the rear wheels.
