= Carlette =

Overview
- Manufacturer: Holstein Garage
- Production: 1913

Body and chassis
- Class: Cyclecar

Powertrain
- Engine: JAP V-twin engine

The Carlette was a British cyclecar made in 1913 by the Holstein Garage of Weybridge, Surrey.

The car was powered by an 8 hp JAP V-twin engine. This was coupled to a countershaft by a rubber belt. Different "gear" ratios were available by moving the position of the belt with final drive by a further belt to the right hand rear wheel.
