= Bédélia =

Archetype of the French cyclecars

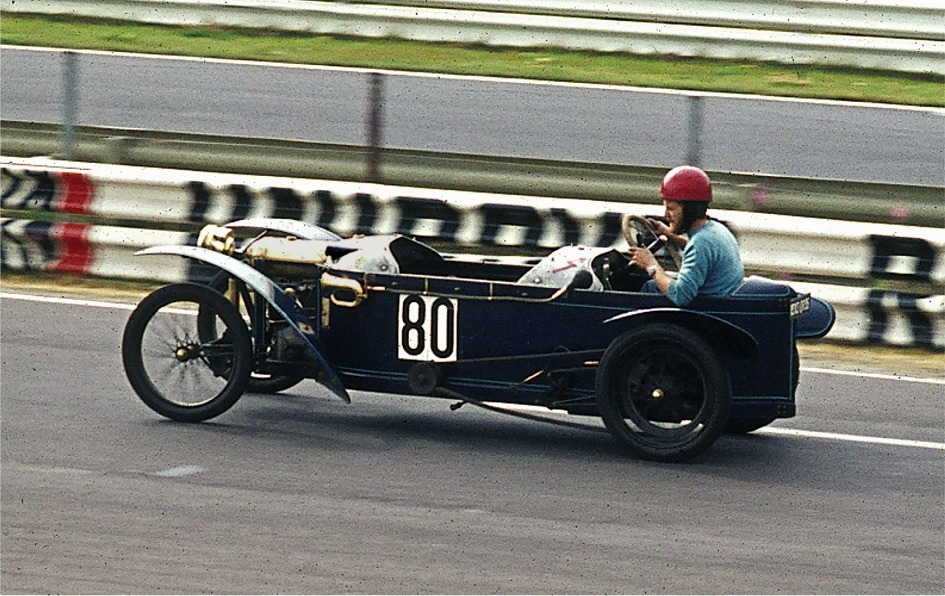
Bédélia from 1910 in 1975 at the Nürburgring

Bédélia (in English usually written as Bedelia) was the archetype of the French cyclecars.

This automobile was manufactured by the Bourbeau et Devaux Co. of Paris from 1910 to 1925 to a design by Robert Bourbeau. Rather than scaling down existing motor-car designs, Bourbeau chose to adapt mainly motor-cycle practice for his design, giving rise to the cyclecar designation. The low and light car carried its two passengers in tandem with the passenger seated at the front, while in the rear was the person doing the steering. Single-cylinder or 10 hp V-twin engines were used. Drive was to the rear wheels through a belt which could be moved between pulleys to give a two speed transmission. The front axle was centre pivoted with suspension by a single mid mounted coil spring and the steering was by a cable and bobbin. Elliptic leaf springs were used at the rear. The method of changing gear was unusual. The rear driver had to operate a lever which slackened the belt by moving the rear axle forwards and then the passenger had to move the belt between pulleys by means of a separate lever. How the car was driven without a passenger is not explained. On later cars the levers were moved so that the driver could steer the car for himself. Before World War I, Bédélia cyclecars sold very well, even in Britain.

A Bédélia won the 1913 Cyclecar Grand Prix held at Amiens. A Morgan came in first, Morgan enthusiasts have claimed it as a win to the present day and it was largely on publicity from this success that Morgan broke into the French market, resulting in the creation of the Darmont company and, tangentially, Sandford. Nevertheless, the second placed French car was subsequently awarded the victory.

Manufacturing rights were obtained by a dealer, a Monsieur Binet in 1920 and he had an updated version of the cars made for him by Mahieux of Levallois-Perret, Seine. The body design was modified to let the driver and passengers sit and a conventional three speed gearbox was fitted. Engines of up to 990 cc were offered.

== Commercial ==
The car's launch coincided with a "Petroleum/gasoline War" involving the competing commercial interests of the United States, Romania and other countries. France, having no indigenous oil supplies of its own, and the Algerian reserves not yet discovered, was particularly badly hit, and government exacerbated the challenge for the infant auto-industry with new car taxes. The light-weight Bedélia cyclecar's introduction was therefore timely. With the cyclecar boom over the company collapsed in 1925.
