= Austro (automobile) =

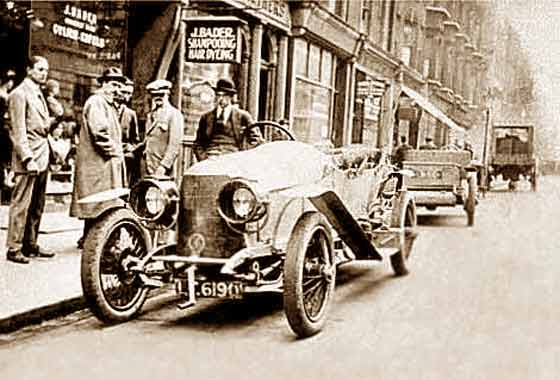
An Austro at Monte Carlo rally in 1913, owned by William Barnard Rhodes-Moorhouse.

The Austro was an Austrian automobile manufactured from 1913 to 1914. It was one of few cyclecars produced in Central Europe. Powered by a 6 horsepower NSU engine, it had a 4-speed gearbox and double chain final drive. It had an independent front suspension, using sliding pillars on the lines of the Morgan. Austro cyclecars did well in mountain trials, as well as the Semmering Hill Climbs. Austro also manufactured aeroplanes.
