= Dayton (cyclecar) =

Dayton, Dayton Dandy, was a British automobile manufactured in 1922 by the Charles Day Manufacturing Co. Ltd. in the London Borough of Hackney W10. The Dandy was a Cyclecar with a single cylinder Blackburne engine producing 4 hp (2.9 kW).

== See also ==
- List of car manufacturers of the United Kingdom

== Sources ==
- Harald Linz und Halwart Schrader: Die Internationale Automobil-Enzyklopädie. United Soft Media Verlag GmbH, München 2008, ISBN 978-3-8032-9876-8
- Nick Georgano: The Beaulieu Encyclopedia of the Automobile, Volume 1 A–F. Fitzroy Dearborn Publishers, Chicago 2001, ISBN 1-57958-293-1 (englisch)
- David Culshaw & Peter Horrobin: The Complete Catalogue of British Cars 1895-1975. Veloce Publishing plc. Dorchester (1997). ISBN 1-874105-93-6
