= Economic (cyclecar) =

Overview
- Manufacturer: Economic Motors
- Production: 1919–1922

Body and chassis
- Class: cyclecar

Powertrain
- Engine: 165 cc flat twin, two-stroke cylinder
- Transmission: friction drive

Chronology
- Successor: none

The Economic was a British three-wheeled cyclecar made from 1919 to 1922 by Economic Motors of Wells Street, London, W1. It was, at £60, almost certainly the cheapest car on the British market at the time.

The car had a single front wheel and no suspension, relying on the tyres and the flexibility of its ash frame to absorb road bumps. The two-seater body was very simple with no windscreen or weather protection. The bodywork was minimal.

The 165 cc, air-cooled, flat twin two-stroke engine drove the right-hand rear wheel by chain, and a variable-speed friction drive transmission was used, giving two forwards speeds and reverse. A top speed of 30 mph was claimed.

A motorcycle using the same engine, also with friction drive, was also offered for £28 10 shillings.

== See also ==
- List of car manufacturers of the United Kingdom
