= Alvechurch (automobile) =

British automobile manufacturer

The Alvechurch, ALC, was a British cyclecar manufactured by the Alvechurch Light Car Company in Alvechurch, near Birmingham, England, in 1911. The company was owned by Dunkleys, a pram maker, who also made cars under their own name.

== Models ==
The car was powered by an 8 hp air-cooled Matchless V-twin air-cooled engine with belt drive. The company could not get the drive system to work properly, and only two cars were made.

The car was revived briefly in 1913 as the ALC but was no more successful.

== See also ==
- List of car manufacturers of the United Kingdom
