= Rhode (car) =

Mead & Deakin
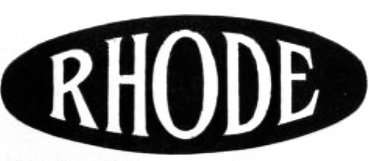

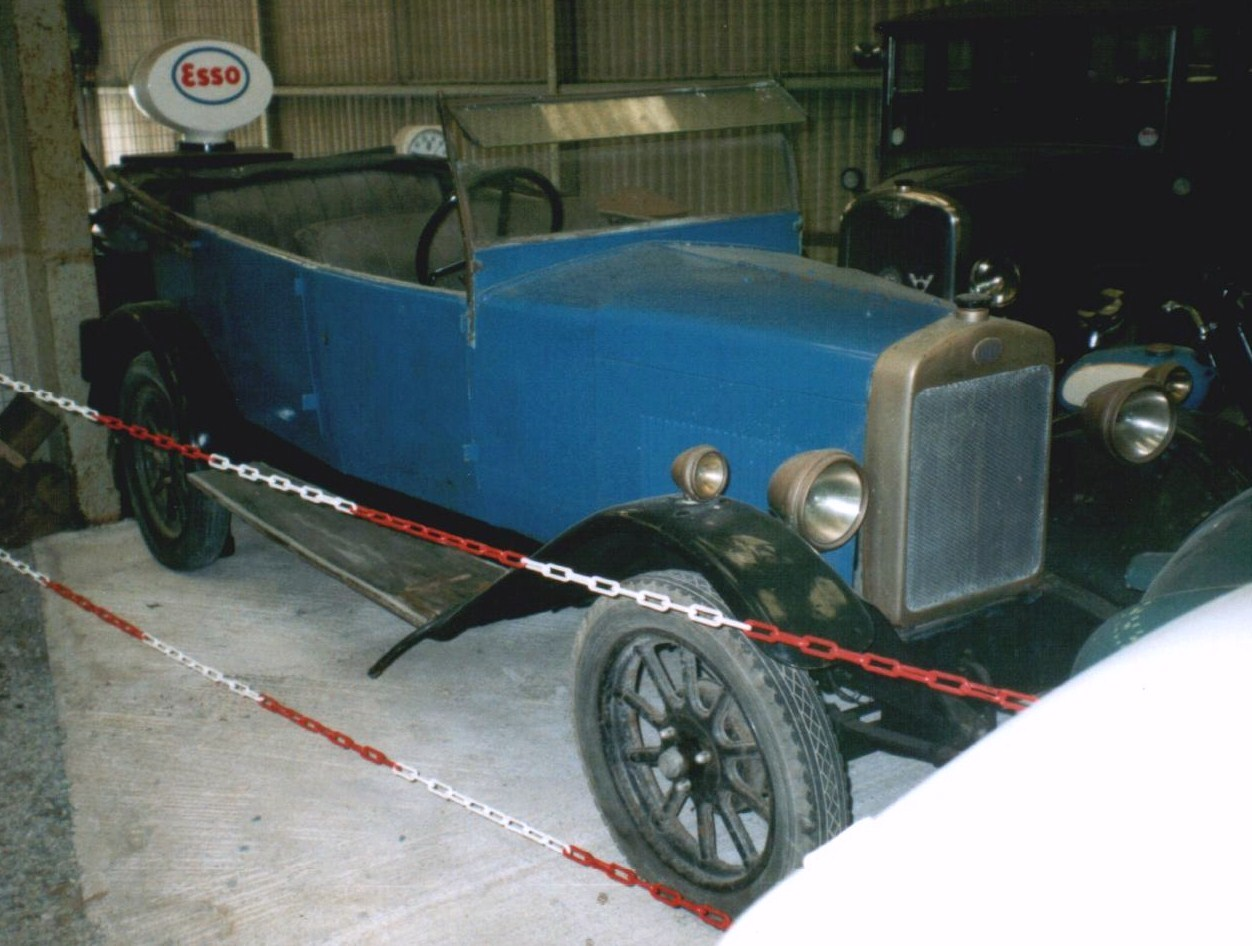
- Industry: Automotive
- Founded: 1904
- Founder: Frederick William Mead, Thomas William Deakin.
- Headquarters: Birmingham, England
- Products: Automobile

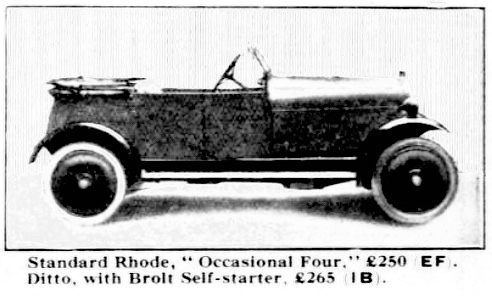
Rhode Occasional Four

The Rhode was a British car made from 1921 to 1930. Mead and Deakin Ltd had started in business making cycle and motor cycle components. They also made the "Canoelet" sidecar. In 1912 they made at least two cyclecars under the name of Medea with 1244cc Chapuis-Dornier engines but these did not go into series production.

In 1921 they decided to return to car making and created a subsidiary company called the Rhode Motor Co with a factory at Blythswood Road, Tyseley, Birmingham. The name was taken from Cecil Rhodes.

In 1926 it was claimed that 50 cars a week were being made.

In 1928 the company was taken over by Thomas McKenzie and H. B. Denley who had been in charge of sales. Production was moved to smaller premises at Hall Green, Birmingham. No engine making facilities existed and the last few cars had Meadows engines. The last cars were made in 1930 or possibly 1931 but were still listed until 1935.

== Rhode 9.5 ==
The "9.5" was unusual in having a four-cylinder engine with overhead camshaft. With a capacity of 1087 cc and made in-house, drive shaft was to the rear wheels through a three speed transmission and at first no differential. The engine had no oil pump with lubrication relying on oil being picked up by the flywheel and being fed by a gallery to the valve gear. The conventional chassis had quarter elliptic springs all round. Braking was by either a transmission brake or a single drum on the solid rear axle. The original coachwork was described as the "Occasional four" indicating that there was just room to squeeze in two rear seat passengers. The de-luxe "Norwood" tourer model was added in 1923.

A Sports version was added in 1923 with a two-seater body with the spare wheel at the rear. The aluminium wings and bonnet were usually left unpainted. The engine was tuned with a high lift camshaft, special cylinder head and fully counterbalanced crankshaft. Options included an electric starter and a differential. A top speed of 65 mph (105 km/hour) and fuel consumption of 45–50 miles per gallon (6.2 to 5.6 L/100 km) was claimed.

About 1000 cars are thought to have been made.

== Rhode 10.8, 11 and 11/30 ==
In 1923 the engine was enlarged to 1223 cc by increasing the cylinder bore from 62 to 66mm and the model name changed to the "10.8". A choice of coachwork with "light four seater", coupe and "enclosed four seater" versions were initially available joined by the "All-weather" in 1924. The cheapest version took the "11" name. The sports version then had an output of 38 bhp (28 kW). In 1925 the Wrigley gearbox was replaced by one of their own manufacture with four speeds and the name changed to the "11/30". Four wheel brakes were also made available. The engine changed from overhead cam to pushrod overhead valves in 1926 and the name reverted to the "10.8".

1500 "10.8"s, "11"s and "11/30"s are thought to have been made.

== Rhode Hawk ==
The final model was the Hawk launched in 1928. The engine reverted to overhead cam and the chassis was lengthened. The only body seems to have been a four-door fabric saloon.

Around 50 were made.
