= Little Midland =

LM
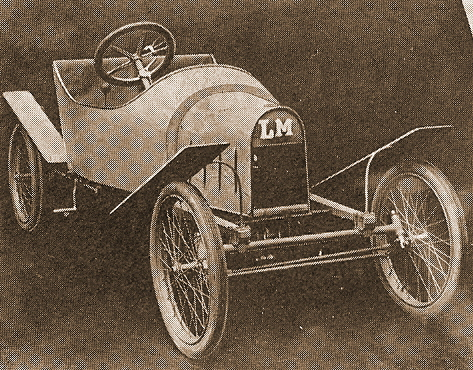
- 1911 LM

Overview
- Manufacturer: Little Midland Light Car Co Ltd
- Production: 1905–1922

Body and chassis
- Class: cyclecar
- Body style: two seat open

The Little Midland or LM was a British 4-wheeled cyclecar made from 1910 to 1922 by the Little Midland Light Car Co Ltd in various places in Lancashire.

The company was founded in Clitheroe by William Cunningham. His first car made in 1905 had a lightweight two-seat open body and was powered by a 7.5 hp single cylinder engine. In 1907 a larger 9 hp four cylinder model appeared with five seat coachwork but possibly only one was made. The 1911 model was powered by a JAP 964cc 7 hp V twin air-cooled engine driving the rear axle via a 2 speed gearbox and chain drive.

A review of the 1913 model, on display at the 1912 Motor Cycle and Cycle Car Show at Olympia, stated that it was one of the first cycle cars made in this country, and that it had benefitted from the production of only one model for the past 2 years. The emphasis was on its ability as a touring car rather than for sporting purposes. The engine was an air-cooled 8 h.p. JAP V-twin with Bosch magneto ignition and B and B carburetor. Transmission was through a metal-to-metal disc clutch, then by Renold chain to the gearbox offering two forward speeds, with the gear always in mesh and selected by substantial dog-clutches. There was then Renold chain back to the back axle, which was remarkably strong with double radius rods, and a massive differential. It was stated that the engine could be started from the driver's seat, though the mechanism was not explained. The weight was 5cwt, and the cost 95 guineas.

After World War I in 1919 the make was revived under new ownership and the company was registered as the Little Midland Light Car Co Ltd and based in Duke Street, Blackburn. The company was re-organised in 1920 and moved to Southgate Works, Preston. The post war car used a 980cc JAP water cooled V-twin engine, cone clutch and three speed gearbox with chain to the rear axle. The suspension used quarter elliptic springs all round. The body had two seats plus a dickey seat and cost £200 in 1920.
