= Le Favori =

The Le Favori was a French automobile manufactured in Paris from 1921 until 1923. A small three-wheeled cyclecar, it featured a 987 cc twin-cylinder engine.
