= Jack Sport =

The Jack Sport was a French automobile manufactured from 1925 until 1930.

Built in Paris by one M. Corbeau (also a builder of motorcycles), it was a 410 cc single-cylinder cyclecar.

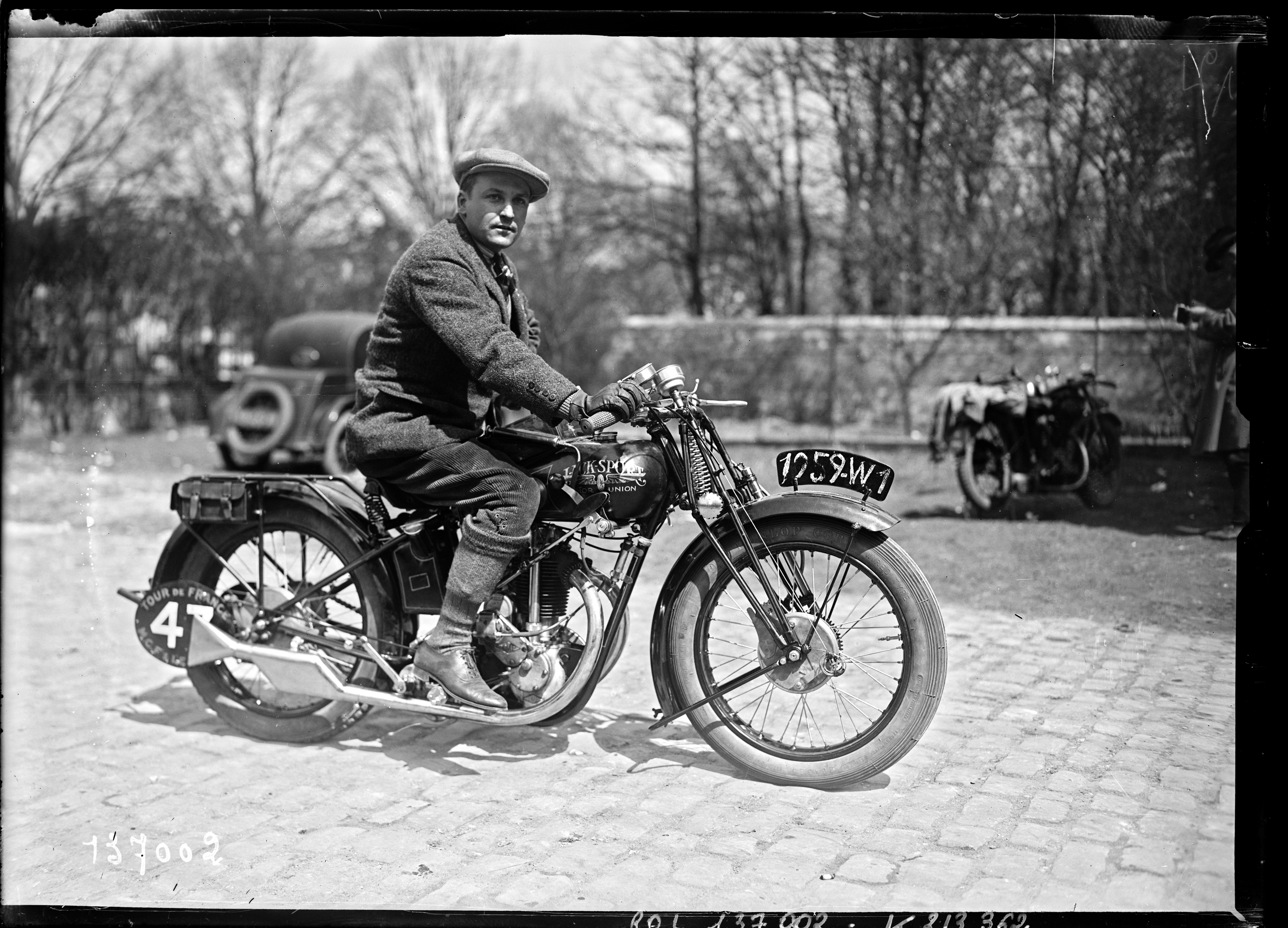
Jack Sport 350cc.

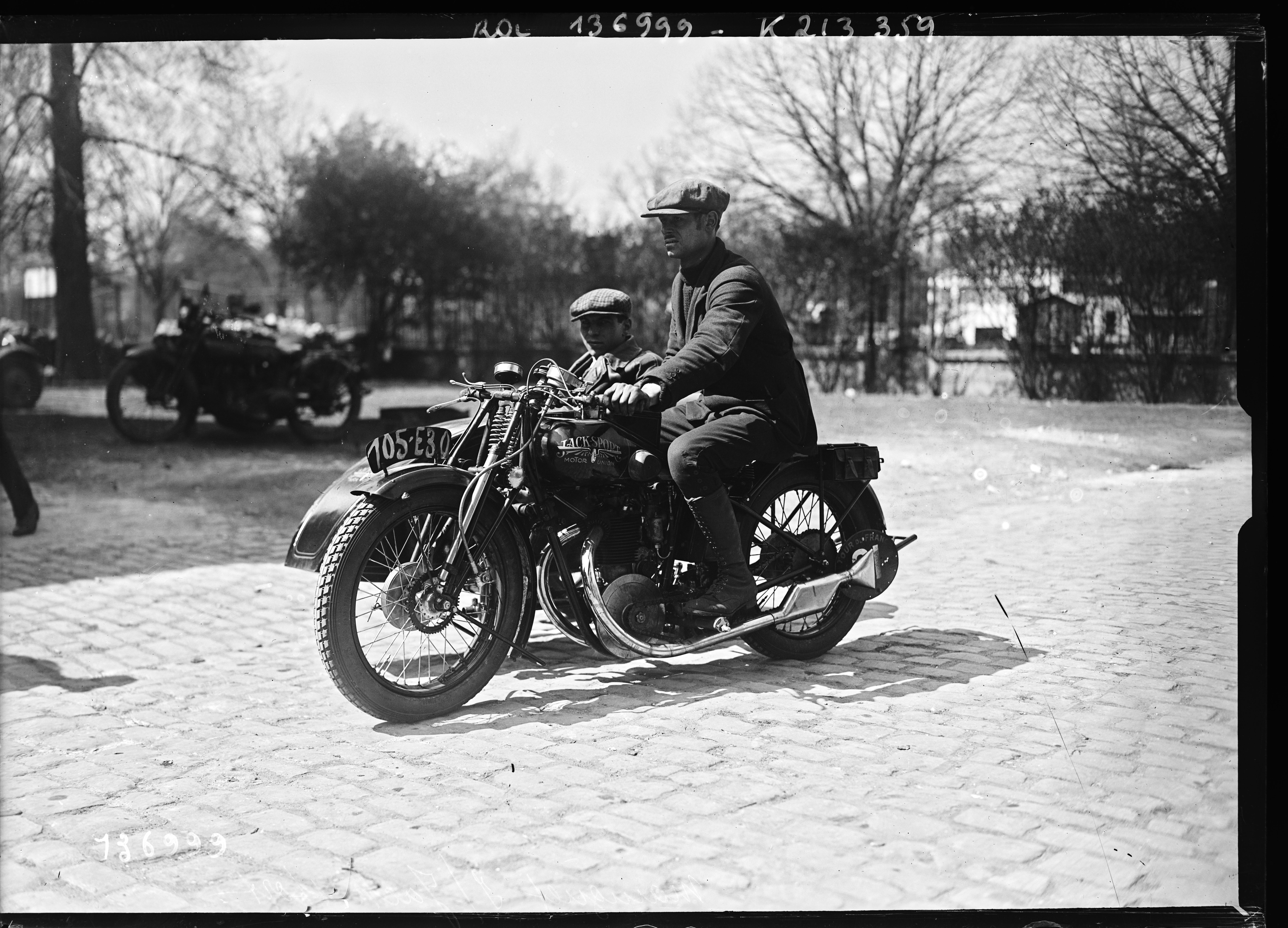
Jack Sport 350cc w/ side-car.

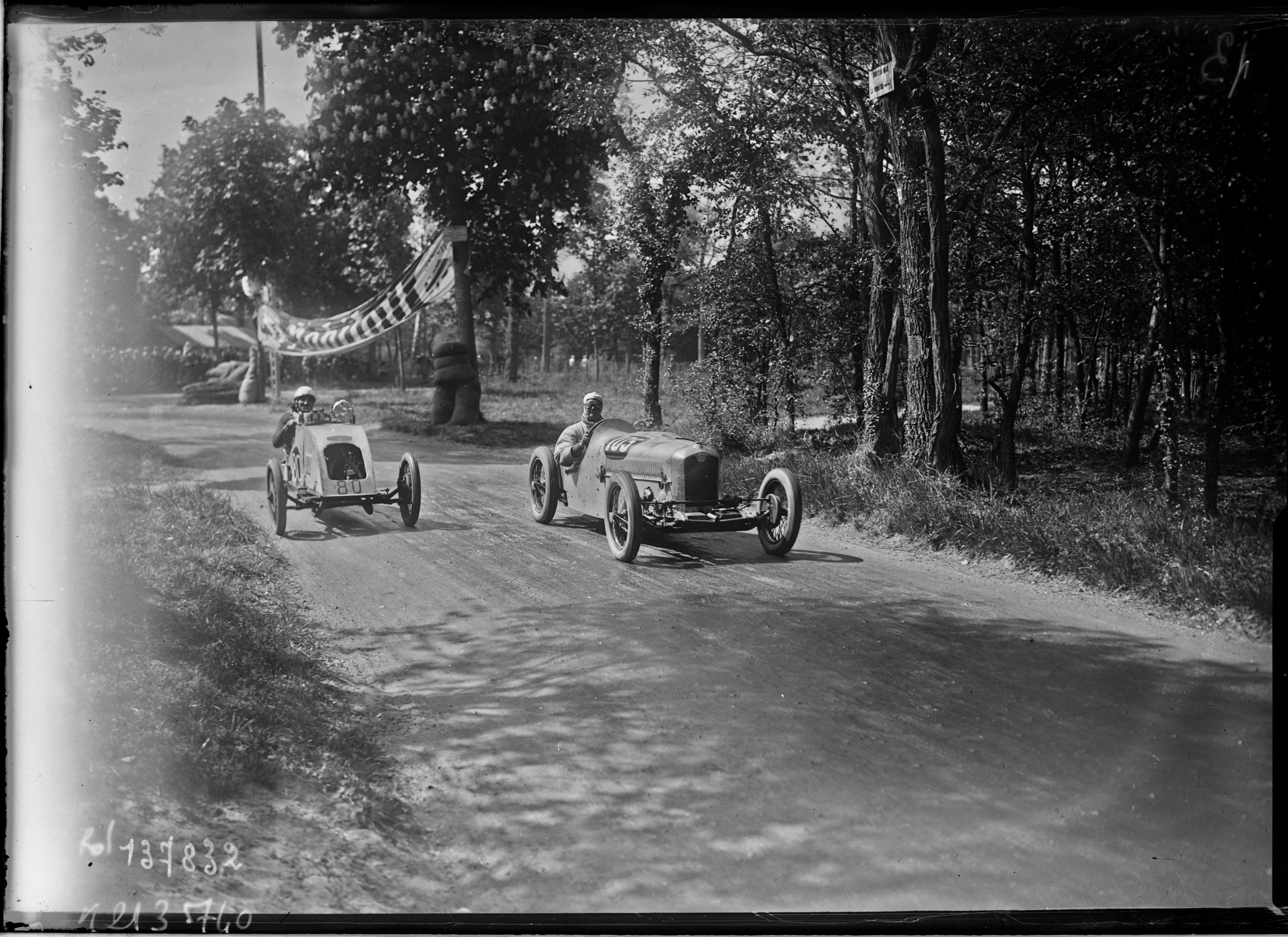
Jack Sport cyclecar 350cc (left).
