= Logan (cyclecar) =

Defunct American motor vehicle manufacturer

Logan is the name of a cyclecar that was built in 1914 only, by the Northwestern Motorcycle Works in Chicago, Illinois.

== History ==
The Logan weighed 500 lb (230 kg), had a wheelbase of 102 in (2,600 mm), and used wire wheels. Power came from an air-cooled engine with two cylinders made by Spacke, delivering 9–13 hp (6.7–9.7 kW; 9.1–13.2 PS). It had friction transmission and belt drive. It was available with a metal roadster body seating two persons side-by side although it had a tread of only 40 in (1,000 mm). Priced at $375 (equivalent to $12,054 in 2025), production was minimal.
