= Astatic =

1920s French cyclecar

The Astatic was a French cyclecar manufactured from 1920 to 1922 by Automobiles Astatic, Saint-Ouen, Seine, France.

Built at Saint-Ouen, the car was an attempt to market a vehicle with independent suspension all round. This was done by coupling each wheel to a horizontal coil spring by a right angle link. At the rear the differential housing was fixed to the chassis and drive was taken to the wheels through jointed drive shafts. The engine was an 894 cc or 1100 cc S.C.A.P.
