= BPD (car) =

Overview
- Manufacturer: Brown, Paine and Dowland Ltd
- Production: 1913

Body and chassis
- Class: Cyclecar

Powertrain
- Engine: JAP V-twin 8 hp
- Transmission: 2-speed manual

Chronology
- Successor: None

The BPD was a British 4-wheeled cyclecar made in 1913 by Brown, Paine and Dowland Ltd of Shoreham-by-Sea, Sussex.

The car was powered by a JAP air-cooled, V twin engine rated at 8 hp and drive was to the rear wheels through a 2-speed gearbox and belts. It is not known if more than a prototype was made.

== See also ==
- List of car manufacturers of the United Kingdom
