= Baker & Dale =

The Baker & Dale was a British cyclecar manufactured in Southbourne, Sussex, in 1913.

It was designed by T.A. Hubert and used a twin-cylinder engine of unknown make and belt drive to the rear axle.
