= Tholomé =

M. Tholomé
- Industry: Automotive
- Founded: 1919
- Defunct: 1922
- Headquarters: Saint-Ouen, France
- Products: Cyclecars

M.Tholomé was an automobile manufacturer based on the north side of Paris between 1919 and 1922, which produced cyclecars.

== History ==
The M. Tholomé company was located at Rue Godillot 27 in Saint-Ouen, Seine-Saint-Denis. In the years directly following the First World War there were many people keen to buy cars but unable to afford them. Cyclecars which were in effect just like normal cars but smaller, lighter and cheaper were a response to this demand, and cyclecar manufacturers proliferated in several European countries, especially France. Tholomé was among the more prominent French cycle car makers. A Tholomé advertisement from 1920 highlights one particular attraction: the car’s weight of 320 kg (i.e. less than 350 kg) meant that it qualified for a reduced annual car tax charge of only 100 francs.

== Cars ==
At the Motor Show in October 1919 the manufacture took a stand and presented an open topped two seater cyclecar that could be ordered with either a V2 7HP 750cc motor-bike engine or a 4-cylinder 10HP 900cc unit, subsequently also available with 1095cc. The four cylinder engines came from Ruby, another cyclecar manufacturer, located nearby: the smaller engines were supplied by the Train motorbike company.

Customers specifying the larger engine were then given a choice between a 2-speed or a 5-speed manual transmission.

An advertisement for the cars in 1920 described the cars, which came with open-topped “torpedo” style bodies with fashionably tapered “boat-deck” style rears, and featuring two seats, positioned one beside the other. Prices were given for “complete cars”, including a hood, a windscreen, lighting, a kit of tools and a spare wheel. The 750cc engine version was priced at 5,350 francs while the four cylinder engine cars were listed at 6,660 francs or 7,250 francs according to whether a two speed or five speed transmission was specified.

== Reference, sources and notes ==
- Harald Linz, Halwart Schrader: Die Internationale Automobil-Enzyklopädie. United Soft Media Verlag, München 2008, ISBN 978-3-8032-9876-8.
- George Nick Georgano (Chefredakteur): The Beaulieu Encyclopedia of the Automobile. Volume 3: P–Z. Fitzroy Dearborn Publishers, Chicago 2001, ISBN 1-57958-293-1. (englisch)
- George Nick Georgano: Autos. Encyclopédie complète. 1885 à nos jours. Courtille, Paris 1975. (französisch)
