= Izaro =

Spanish automobile manufactured around 1922

The Izaro was a Spanish automobile manufactured around 1922. A cyclecar with models ranging from 600 cc to 700 cc, it was a product of Madrid.
