= La Roulette =

The La Roulette was a French automobile manufactured from 1912 until 1914. An 8/10 hp vee-twin cyclecar, it was built in Courbevoie.
