= Quo Vadis (automobile) =

The Quo Vadis was a French cyclecar manufactured in Courbevoie from 1921 until 1923. It featured a twin-cylinder Train engine.
