= Arzac =

French automobile manufacturer

The Arzac was a small French cyclecar manufactured in Paris from 1926 to 1927. Made by Gabriel Arzac from a westsouth city, Bergerac (Dordogne). The automobile featured front-wheel drive, independent suspension on all wheels, and either a 483 cc or a 500 cc two-stroke engine.
