= De Marçay =

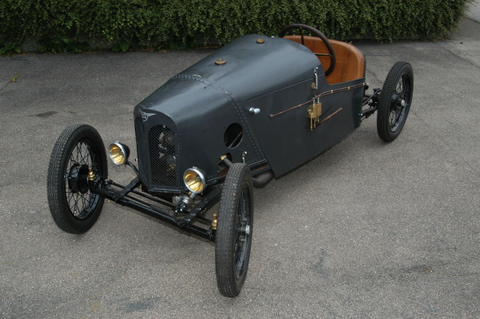
De Marçay

The De Marcay was a French automobile manufacturer from 1920 until 1922. Similar to the GN, it was a cyclecar powered by a 1000 cc Anzani vee-twin engine and shaft drive, and was the product of a former manufacturer of aircraft.
