= Robinson & Price =

Defunct British car manufacturer

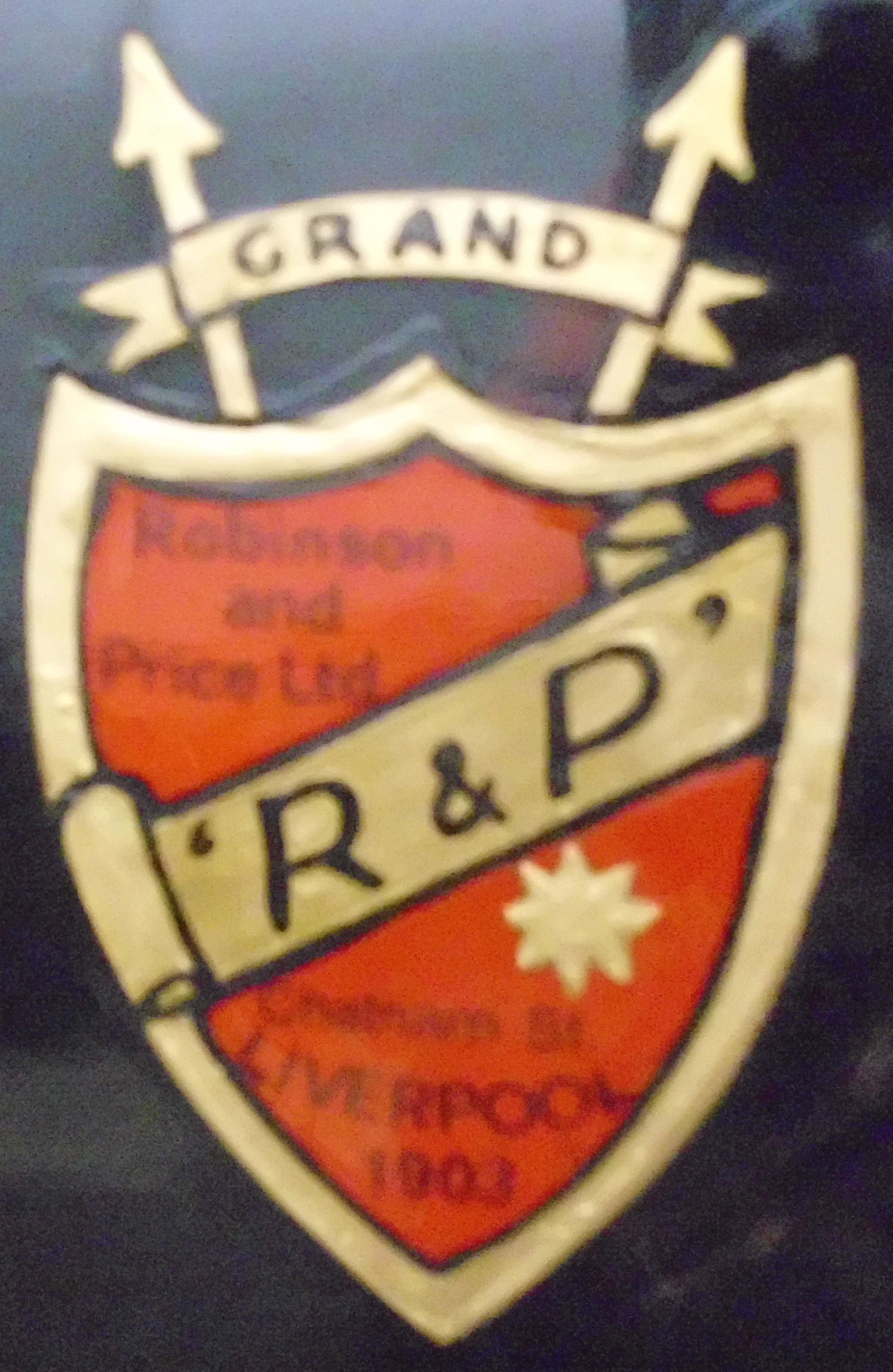
Robinson & Price logo

Robinson & Price was a British automobile manufacturer based in Liverpool (Lancashire) from 1905 to 1914.

In 1905 and 1906 two models were manufactured - a 6 1/2 hp with a single-cylinder engine, and a 10/12 hp with a two-cylinder engine. The success was low, and only small numbers were built.

In 1913, the company introduce a single-cylinder model, the 6/8 hp. Production ended at the start of the First World War in 1914.

== Sources ==
- Harald Linz und Halwart Schrader: Die Internationale Automobil-Enzyklopädie (in German). United Soft Media Verlag GmbH, München 2008, ISBN 978-3-8032-9876-8.
- Nick Georgano: The Beaulieu Encyclopedia of the Automobile, Volume 3 P–Z. Fitzroy Dearborn Publishers, Chicago 2001, ISBN 1-57958-293-1.
- David Culshaw & Peter Horrobin: The Complete Catalogue of British Cars 1895–1975. Veloce Publishing plc. Dorchester (1999). ISBN 1-874105-93-6.
