= Dana (car) =

Danish automobile brand

- Company type: Private
- Industry: Automotive
- Founded: 1908
- Founder: Haken Olsen
- Defunct: 1914
- Headquarters: Denmark

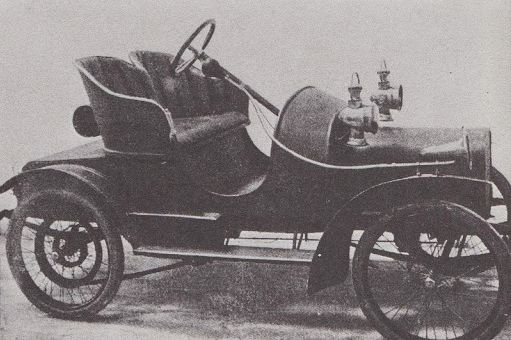
Dana cyclecar in 1908

The Dana was a Danish car built by Hakon Olsen from 1908 to 1914 in Copenhagen, Denmark. The car had a Peugeot air-cooled 6 hp engine. The end of its production has been attributed to different company priorities after the outbreak of World War I.
