= Janémian =

The Janémian was a French automobile manufactured from 1920 until 1923. Built by a M. Janémian in Bièvres, Essonne, they had rear engines, transversely mounted, with chain drive to the rear wheels which were set closely together. The cars originally were powered by flat twin engines of 1100 or 1400 cc replaced in 1922 by 1096 cc then 1395 cc vee-twins.
