= Malcolm Jones (automobile) =

Defunct American motor vehicle manufacturer

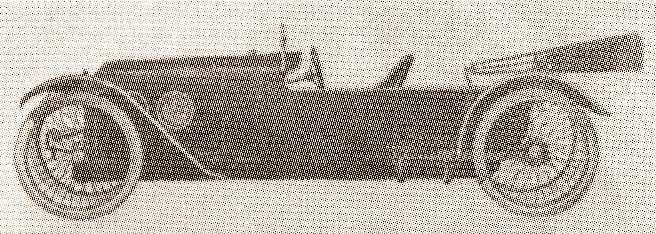
1914 Malcolm Jones Cyclecar

The Malcolm Jones was an American automobile manufactured in Detroit from 1914 to 1915.

== History ==
The first model was a cyclecar that used a V-twin engine with belt drive and had tandem seating. Only prototypes were built. A larger 4-cylinder model with shaft drive followed in 1915 and called the Malcolm, but production ended in the same year.
