= Beacon Motors =

Beacon Motors Ltd was a British automobile manufacturer based in Hindhead, Surrey from 1912 to 1913 moving to Liphook, Surrey until 1914.

The first Beacon was powered by an air-cooled JAP V-twin engine, with a variable-ratio friction transmission and chain drive to the rear axle. Later models were powered by a 1093 cc engine from the French company Griffon, with shaft drive and a three-speed gearbox on the rear axle.

Although otherwise a conventional and "undistinguished" cyclecar, it was differentiated by the option of a cane wickerwork body instead of the standard offering of a metal-panelled wooden frame.
