= Storms (automobile) =

Defunct American motor vehicle manufacturer

The Storms was an electric cycle-car produced by the William E Storms company in Detroit in 1915. It was thought to be the only American electric cycle-car. They produced a two-seater or three-seater body, costing between $750 and $950.
