= Bjering (car) =

Automobile brand from Norway

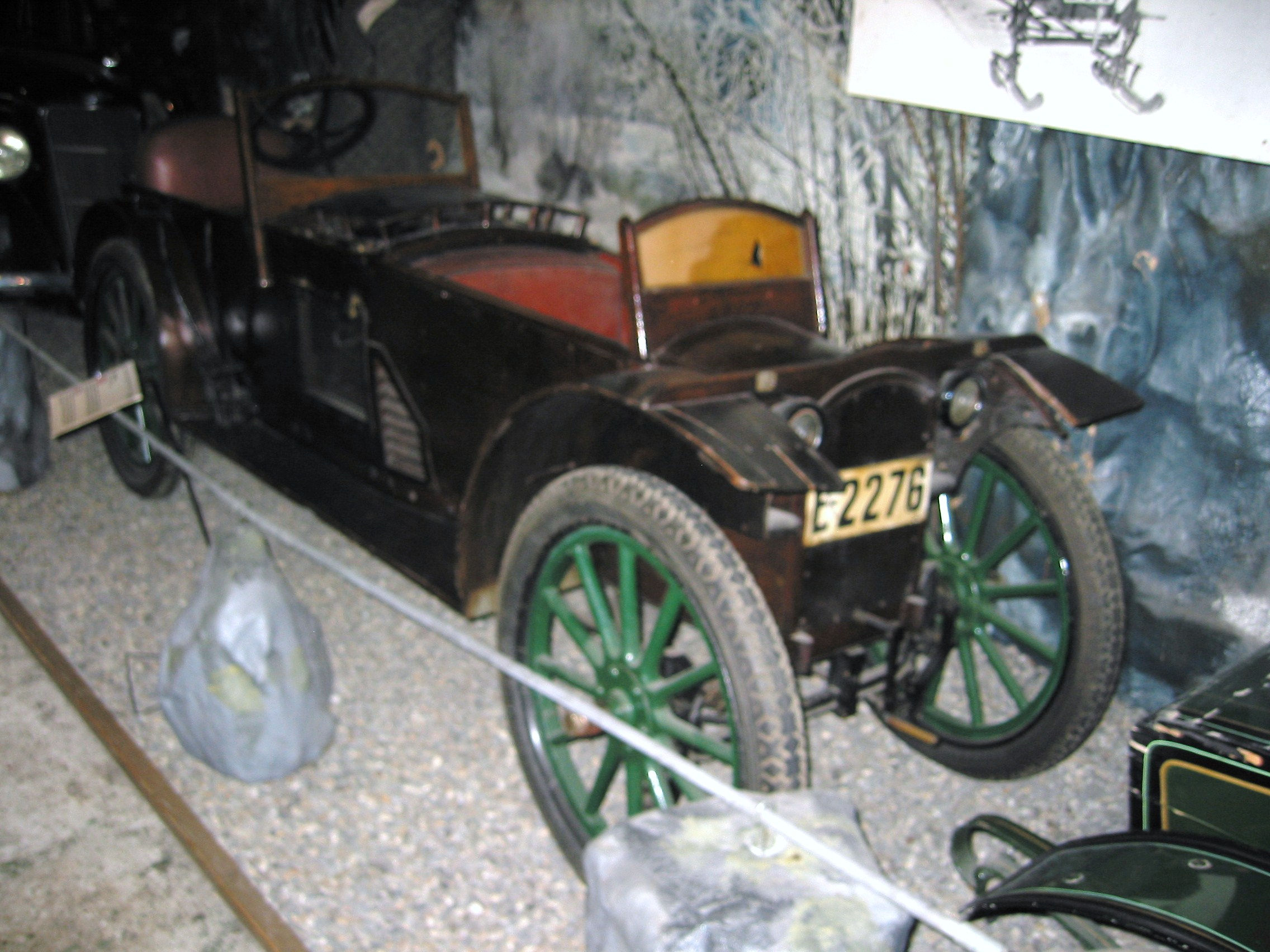
Bjering automobile

Bjering was the brand name of an automobile type constructed by Hans Christian Bjering in Gjøvik, Norway. The car had an unusual tandem-arrangement of its two seats and an air-cooled V4 engine. Its small width made the vehicle capable of driving in the narrow track left by the snow plough in the Norwegian roads during winter. Only six were thought to have been built between 1920 and 1925.

Bjering was born in 1871. He became interested in the engineering profession, and in 1914 began working for the company Jøssingfjord, which produced power plants. Working at the company, he invented a twin blade lawnmower, and in 1917 opened his own company Bjering Slaamaskiner.

In 1918 Bjering designed and built a prototype car. Based on the design, four vehicles were constructed by A/S Autoslæde between 1920 and 1921. They were only 1 metre wide. It was designed to drive on narrow winter roads and sledging. The engine was an air-cooled V-4 of 2010 cm^{3} placed between the seats. The driver sat at the back over the drive wheels. The body was made of wood. It was also equipped with a snow plow. The front wheels could be replaced with skis. The remaining two cars were built between 1923 and 1925 for the Norwegian military by Raufoss Patronfabrik under contract with the Ministry of Defense. These had rear-mounted rail motors and were built in aluminum.

Two of the cars are on display in the Norsk Kjøretøyhistorisk Museum in Lillehammer.

On 7 October 2017 the Norway Postal Service issued four new stamps featuring Norwegian cars, one of which was a Bjering.
