= Crescent (cyclecar) =

Crescent Motors Ltd manufactured a cyclecar in Walsall and Birmingham between 1911 and 1915.

The firm, based on Pleck Road, was founded by James Bailey and became a limited company in October 1911 but had been issuing advertising material from at least March.

Two models were produced both powered by J.A.P air-cooled V-twin engines with friction disc transmission and belt drive. The friction drive consisted of a vertical driven disc and a smaller wheel that could be moved across the face of the driven disc so the distance from the drive axis would give variable gearing. A clutch action was made by lifting the driven wheel off the drive disc. Moving the driven wheel past the centre gave a reverse gear. The smaller car with an engine rated for taxation at 5/6 hp had tandem seating with the driver sitting behind the passenger. The larger model had a 7/9 hp engine.

By 1913 the tandem seating was replaced by more conventional side by side coachwork and windscreen. The engine had grown to 964 cc with a RAC horsepower rating of 8 hp. The belt drive was replaced by a shaft to the friction disc and chain to the back axle. The price was quoted as £115.

When Crescent Motors moved to Britannia Works, Rolfe Street, Smethwick, Birmingham, the J.A.P engine was replaced by a water-cooled Precision or a Blumfield V-twin engine. The final drive by chain was to only one of the rear wheels with the other driven by a friction plate so a differential was not needed. The only body style offered was a 2-seater open model, which sold for £127.

The Crescent was popular with female motorists, with several registered in the West Midlands.

Production ended in 1915, and only one Crescent is known to survive. The number made is not known.
