= Strouse (automobile) =

Defunct American motor vehicle manufacturer

The Strouse was a two-seater roadster built by the Stouse, Ranney and Knight company of Detroit, Michigan, from 1915 to 1916. The roadster was powered by a 4-cylinder, water cooled engine with a friction transmission and a single chain drive. It was priced between $300 and $325.
