= List of automobile manufacturers of France =

== Current manufacturers ==
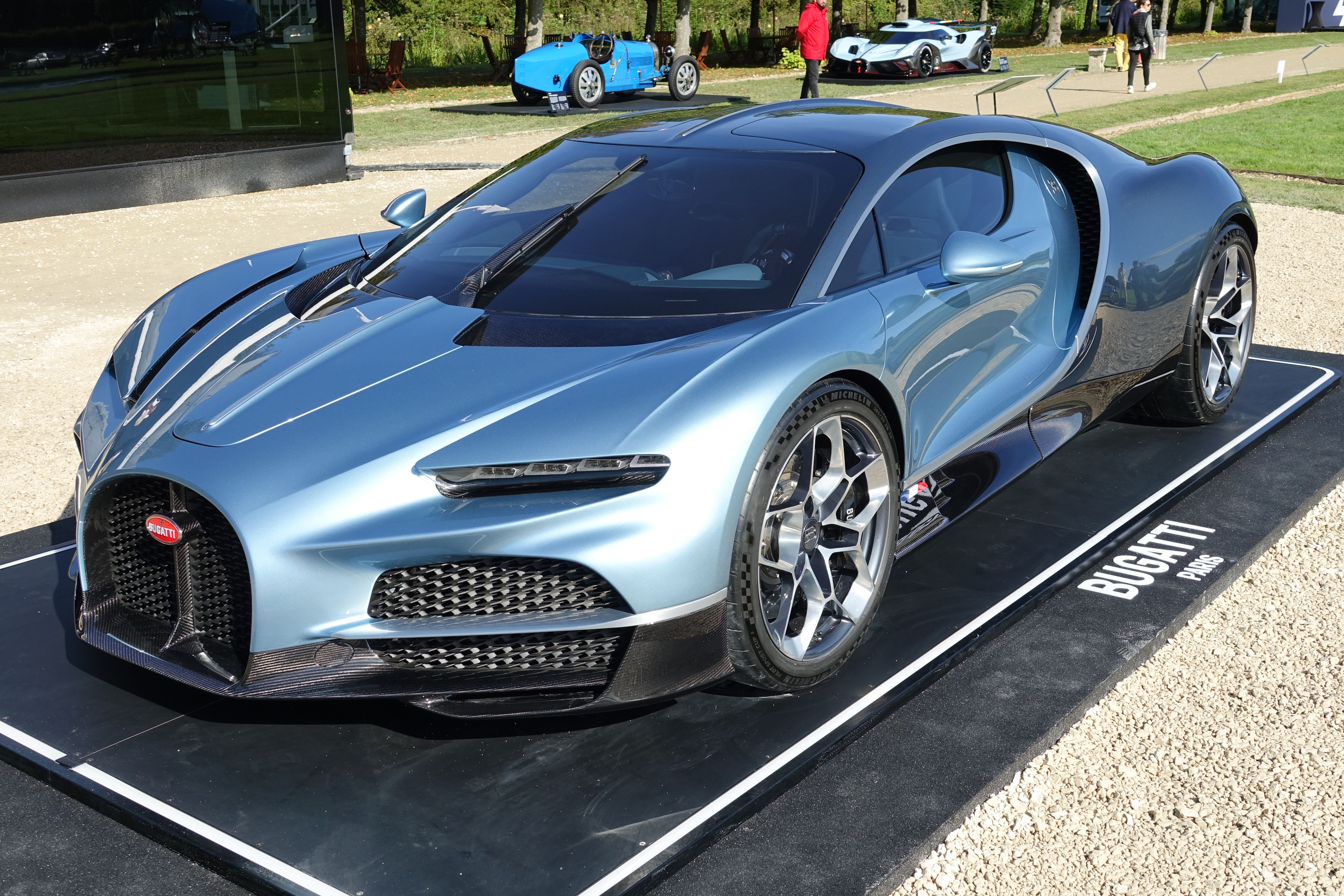
Bugatti Tourbillon

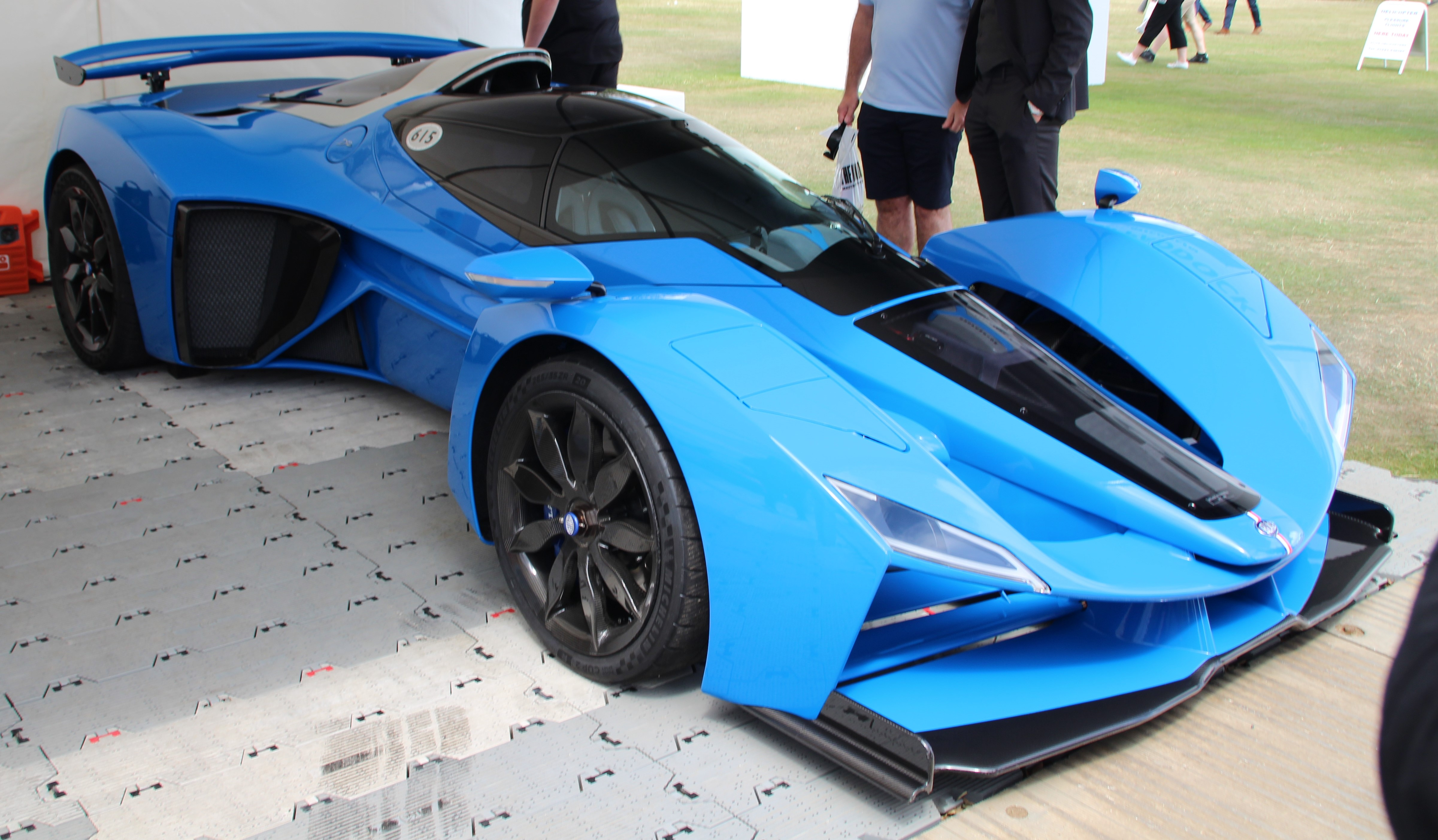
Delage D12

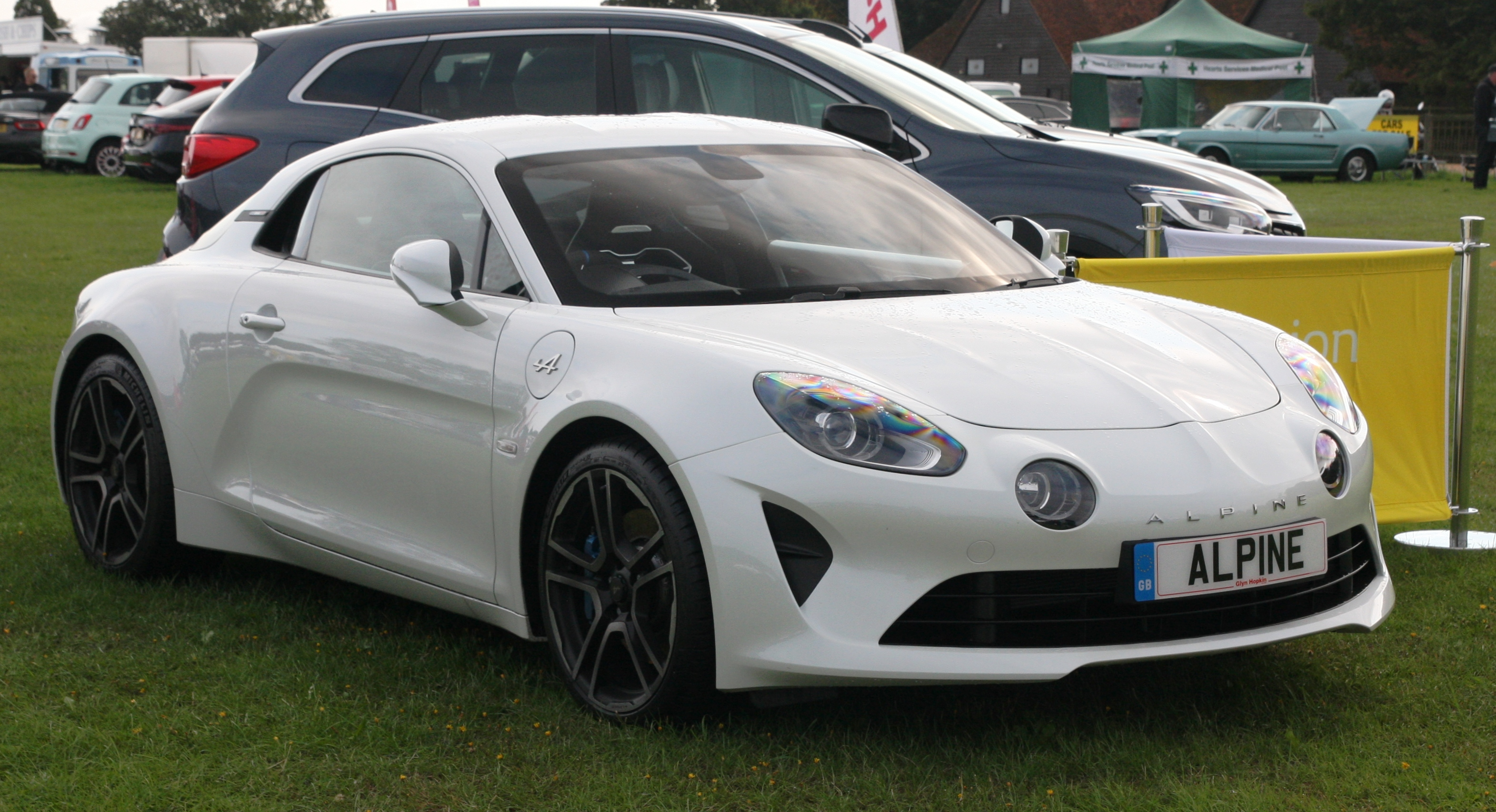
Alpine A110

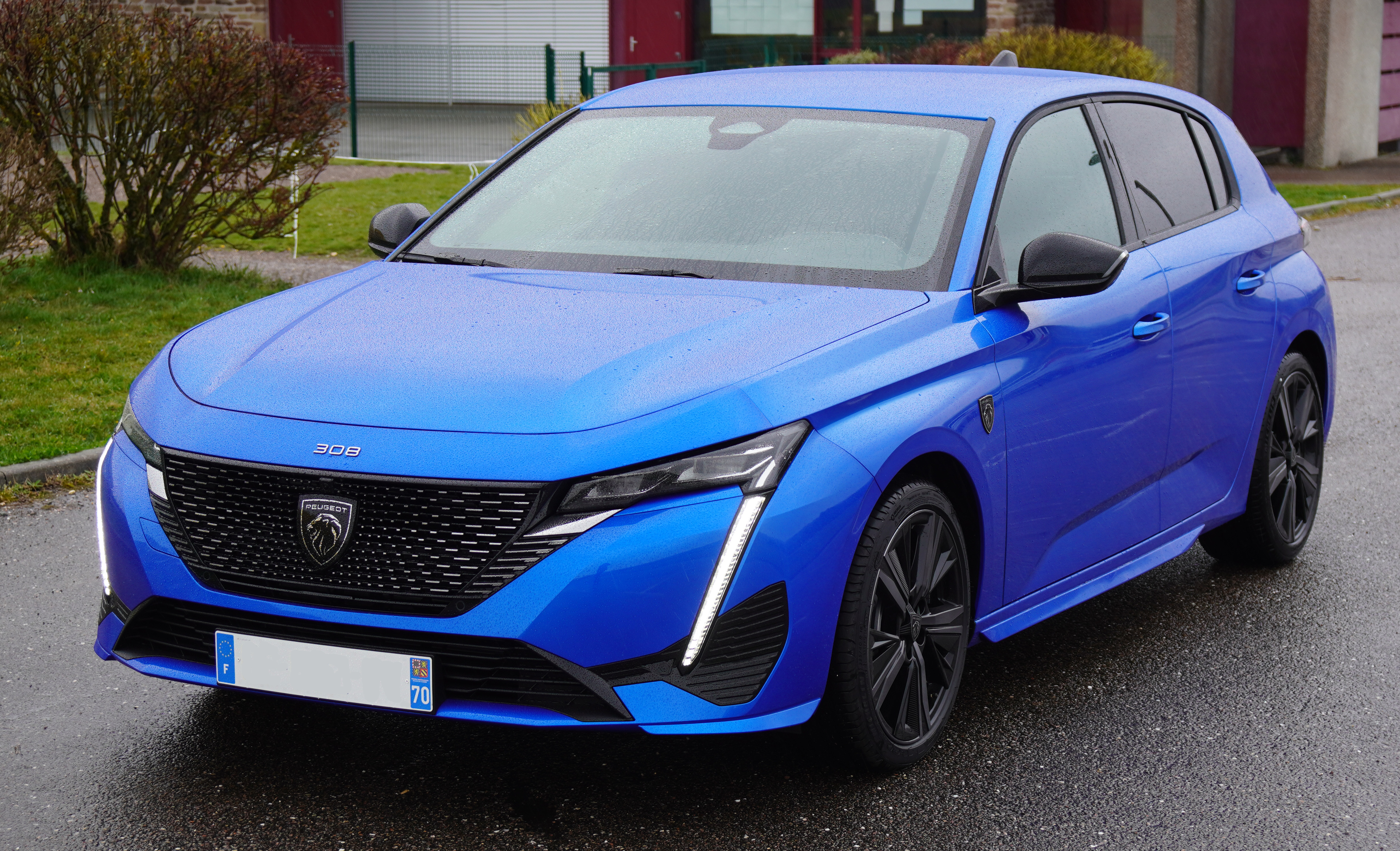
Peugeot 308

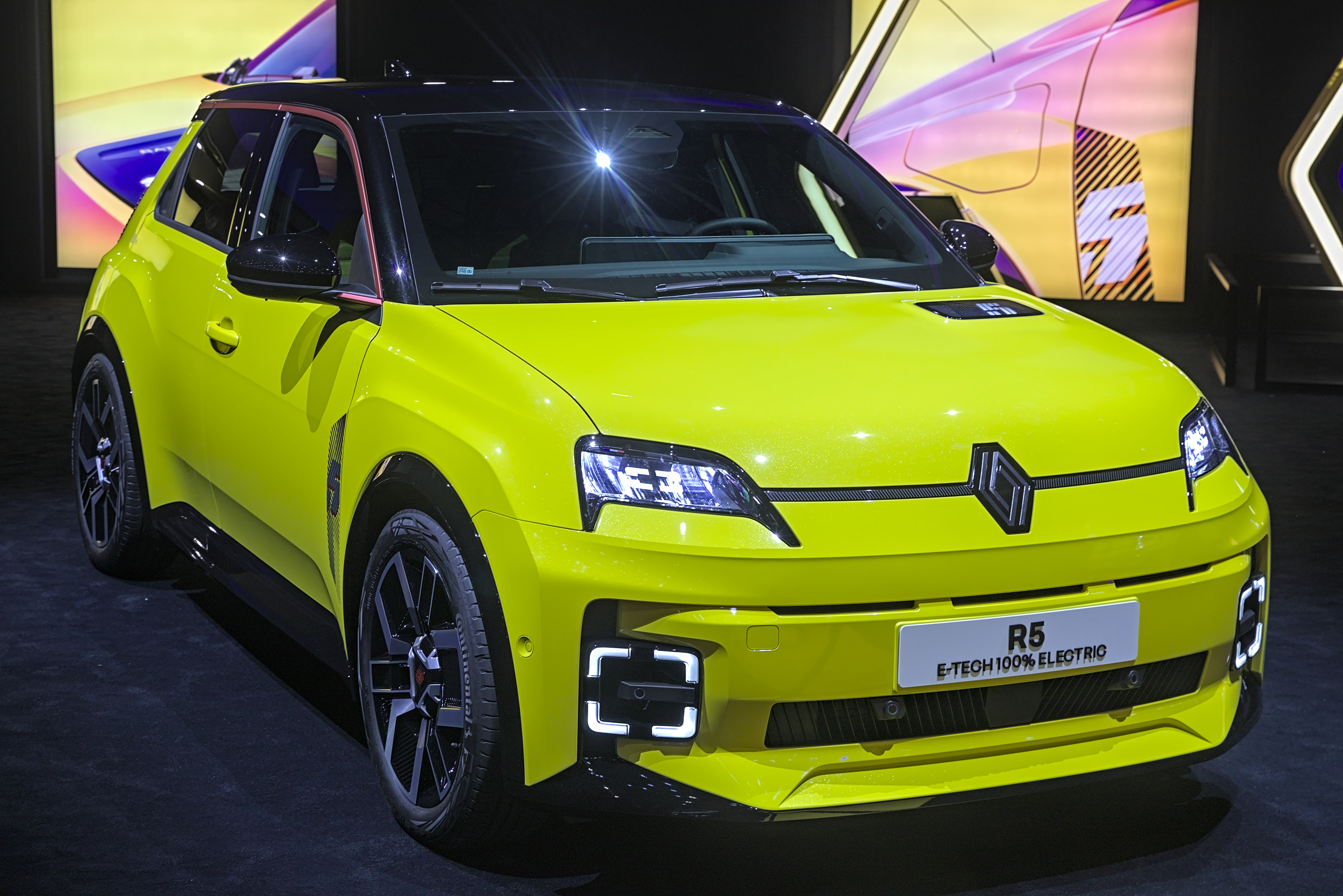
Renault 5 E-Tech

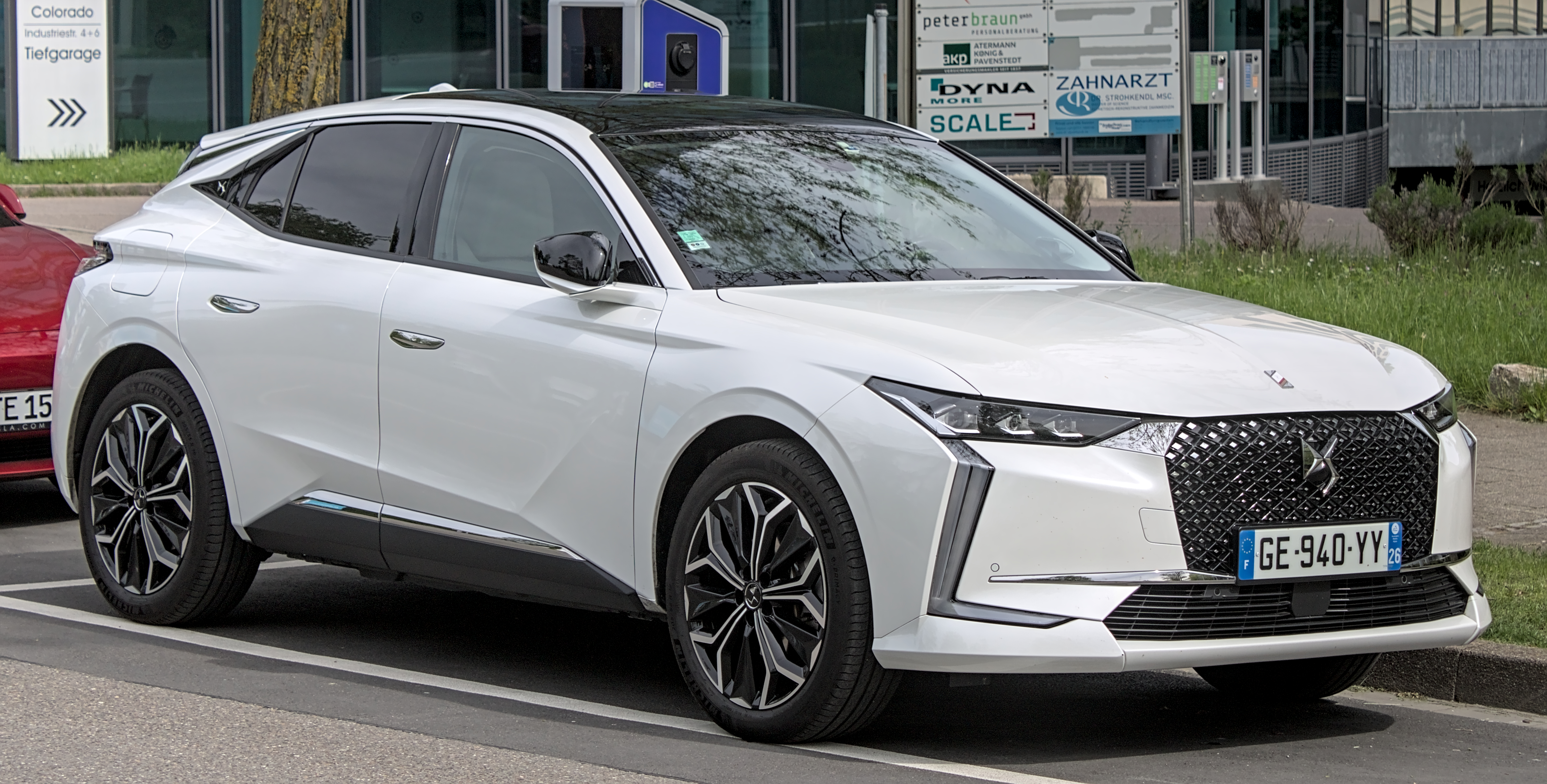
DS 4

Company	Parent company
Aixam (1984–present)	Polaris Industries
Alpine (1955–present)	Groupe Renault
Bugatti (1909–1963, 1987–1995, 1998–present)	Bugatti Rimac
Citroën (1919–present)	Stellantis
Delage (1905–present)	
DS Automobiles (2014–present)	Stellantis
Ligier (1968–present)	
Peugeot (1896–present)	Stellantis
PGO (1986–present)	
Renault (1899–present)	Groupe Renault

== Other manufacturers ==
- 4 Stroke Rumen (2006-present)
- Bellier (1968–present)
- Bolloré (2008–present)
- Chatenet (1984-present)
- De Clercq (1992–present)
- De La Chapelle (1985–present)
- Exagon Motors (2005–present)
- Genty Automotive (2004–present), see Genty Akylone
- MDI (1988–present)
- Microcar (1980–present); Driveplanet
- Secma (1995–present)
- Venturi (1984–present)
- roborace Cars

== Former manufacturers ==
=== A ===
- AAA (1919–1920)
- Able (1920–1927)
- AC3 (1998–2002)
- Ader (1900–1907)
- AER (1930)
- AEM(1920–1924)
- Aérocaréne (1947)
- Ageron (1910–1914)
- Ailloud (1898–1904)
- Ajams (1920)
- Ajax (1913–1919)
- AL (1907–1909)
- Alamagny (1947–1948)
- Alba (1913–1928)
- Albatros (1912)
- Alcyon (1906–1929)
- Alda (1912–1922)
- Allard-Latour (1899–1902)
- Alliance (1905–1908)
- Alphi (1929–1931)
- Alma (1926–1927)
- Alva (1913–1923)
- AM (1906–1915)
- Amédée Bollée (1885–1921)
- Amilcar (1921–1939)
- Ampère (1906–1909)
- Anderson Electric (1912)
- Andre Py (1899)
- Antoinette (1906–1907)
- Arbel (1951–1959) also known as Loubiére, Loubiéres, Symétric, Symétric-Arbel, or Symétric-Paris
- Ardent (1900–1901)
- Ardex (1934–c.1937; 1952–1955)
- Ariane (1907)
- Ariès (1903–1938)
- Arista (1912–1915)
- Arista (1952–1967)
- Arola (1976–1983)
- Arzac (1926–1927)
- AS (1924–1928)
- ASS (1919–1920)
- Astatic (1920–1922)
- Aster (1900–1910)
- Astra (1922)
- Astresse (1898)
- Ateliers d’Automobiles et d’Aviation (AAA) (1919–1920)
- Ateliers de Construction Mecanique l'Aster (1890s–1912)
- Atla (1957–1959)
- Atlas (1951)
- Audibert & Lavirotte (1894–1901)
- Auge (1898–c.1901)
- Austral (1907)
- Autobleu (1953–1957)
- Automoto (1901–1907)
- Avions Voisin (1905–1946)
- Avolette (1955–1959)

=== B ===
- Ballot (1921–1932)
- Barré (1899–1930)
- Beck (1920–1922)
- Bédélia (1910–1925)
- Bellanger (1912–1925)
- Bel Motors (1976–1980)
- Benjamin (1921–1931)
- Berliet (1895–1939)
- Bernardet (1946–1950)
- Bignan (1918–1930)
- Blériot (1921–1922)
- BNC (1923–1931)
- Boitel (1946–1949)
- Bolide (1899–1907)
- Bonnet (1961–1964)
- Borderel-Cail
- Bouquet, Garcin & Schivre/BGS (1899–1906)
- Brasier (1905–1926)
- Brouhot (1898–1911)
- Bucciali (1922–1933)
- Buchet (1910–1930)
- Bugatti (1909–1963)
- Butterosi (1919–1924)

=== C ===
- Cambier (1897–c.1905)
- Castoldi (1900)
- Cedre (1975–1987)
- CD (1962–1965)
- CG (Chappe et Gessalin) (1966–1974)
- CGV (Charron, Girardot et Voigt) (1901–1906)
- Chaigneau-Brasier (1926–1930)
- Chainless (1900–1903)
- Charlon (1905–1906)
- Charron (1907–1930)
- Chenard-Walcker (1900–1946)
- CHS (1945–1946)
- Claveau (1923–1956)
- Clément-Bayard (1903–1922)
- Coadou et Fleury (1921–c.1935)
- Cochotte (1899)
- Cognet de Seynes (1912–1926)
- Cohendet (1898–1914)
- Colda (1921–1922)
- Constantinesco (1926–1928)
- Corre (1901–1907)
- Cottereau (1898–1910)
- Cottin & Desgouttes (1905–1931)
- Cournil (1960–1984)
- Couteret (1907)
- Couverchel (1905–1907)
- Créanche (1899–1906)
- Crespelle (1906–1923)
- Croissant (1920–1922)
- Culmen (c.1909)

=== D ===
- Dalifol (1896)
- Dalifol & Thomas (1896–1898)
- Damaizin & Pujos (1910)
- Dangel (1968–1971)
- Danvignes (1937–1939)
- Darl'mat (1936–1950)
- Darmont (1921–1939)
- Darracq (1896–1920)
- Le Dauphin (1941–1942)
- David & Bourgeois (1898)
- DB (1938–1961)
- De Bazelaire (1908–1928)
- De Cezac (1922–1927)
- De Dietrich (1897–1905)
- De Dion-Bouton (1883–1932)
- De Marcay (1920–1922)
- De Riancey (1898–c.1901)
- De Sanzy (1924)
- Decauville (1898–1910)
- Deguingand (1927–1930)
- Deho (1946–1948)
- Delage (1905–1953)
- Delahaye (1895–1954)
- Delaugère et Clayette (1864–1934)
- Delamare-Deboutteville (1883–1887)
- Delaugère (1898–1926)
- Delaunay-Belleville (1904–1948)
- Delfosse (1922–1926)
- Demeester (1906–1914)
- De Boisse (1901–1904)
- Derby (1921–1936)
- Desmoulins (1920–1923)
- Dewald (1902–1926)
- Dinin Alfred (1904)
- DFP (1906–1926)
- Diederichs (1912–1914)
- Dolo (1947–1948)
- Donnet (1928–1936)
- Donnet-Zedel (1924–1928)
- Dumas (1902–1903)
- Dumont (1912–1913)
- Duport (1977–1994)
- D’Yrsan (1923–1930)

=== E ===
- E.H.P. (1921–1929)
- Electricar (1919–1924)
- Elfe (1920–1925)
- Elgé (1868–1942)
- Elysée (1921–1925)
- Enders (1911–1923)
- Esculape (1899)
- Eudelin (c.1905–1908)
- Eureka (1906–1909)

=== F ===
- Facel Vega (1954–1964)
- FAL (1907)
- Farman (1919–1931)
- Favier (c.1925–1930)
- FL (1909–1914)
- Ford SAF (1916–1954)
- Fonlupt (1920–1922)
- Fouillaron (1900–1914)
- Fournier (1913–1924)

=== G ===
- Galy (1954–1957)
- Galba (1929–1930)
- Gardner-Serpollet (1900–1907)
- Gautier–Wehrlé (1894–1900)
- Georges Irat (1921–1953)
- Georges Richard (1897–1902)
- Georges Roy (1906–1929)
- Gillet-Forest (1900–1907)
- Gladiator (1896–1920)
- Gobron-Brillié (1898–1930)
- Gordini (1951–1957)
- Goujon (1896–1901)
- GRAC (1964–1974)
- Gregoire (1904–1924)
- Grillet (Company name. Cars sold under the name "Ryjan") (1920–1926)
- Grivel (1897)
- Guerraz (1901)
- Guerry et Bourguignon (1907)
- Guyot Spéciale (1925–1931)

=== H ===
- Hanzer (1899–1903)
- Hautier (1899–1905)
- Hédéa (1912–1924)
- Heinis (1925–1930)
- Helbé (1905–1907)
- Henou (1923)
- Henry Bauchet (1903)
- Henry-Dubray (1901)
- Hérald (1901–1906)
- Hinstin (1921–1926)
- Hispano-Suiza (1911–1938)
- Hommell (1994–2003)
- Hotchkiss (1903–1955)
- Hrubon (1980–1988)
- Hurtu (1896–1930)

=== I ===
- Inaltera (1976–1978)
- Induco (1921–1924)
- Inter (1953–1956)

=== J ===
- J-P Wimille (1948–1949)
- Jack Sport (1925–1930)
- Janémian (1920–1923)
- Janoir (1921–1922)
- Janvier (1903–1904)
- Jean-Bart (1907)
- Jean Gras (1924–1927)
- Jeantaud (1893–1906)
- JG Sport (1922–1923)
- Jidé (1969–1974; 1977–1981)
- Jouffret (1920–1926)
- Jousset (1924–1928)
- Jouvie (1913–1914)
- Julien (1946–1949)
- Juzan (1897)

=== K ===
- Kevah (1920–1924)
- Koch (1898–1901)
- Korn et Latil (1901–1902)
- Kriéger (1897–1908)
- KVS (1976–c.1984)

=== L ===
- La Buire (1904–1930)
- La Confortable (c.1920)
- Lacoste & Battmann (1897–1910)
- Lafitte (1923–1924)
- Lahaussois (1907)
- Landulet (2014)
- La Licorne (1907–1950)
- L'Alkolumine (1899)
- La Lorraine (1899–1902)
- Lambert (1926–1953)
- La Nef (c.1901–1914)
- La Perle (1913–1927)
- La Ponette (1909–1925)
- La Radieuse (1907)
- L'Ardennais (1901–c.1903)
- La Roulette (1912–1914)
- La Va Bon Train (1904–1914)
- Lavie (c.1904)
- Le Blon (1898)
- Le Cabri (1924–1925)
- Le Favori (1921–1924)
- Léon Bollée (1896–1931)
- Le Piaf (1951–1952)
- Le Pratic (1908)
- Le Roitelet (1921–1924)
- Leyat (1919–1927)
- Le Zèbre (1909–1931)
- Linon (1900–1914)
- Lion-Peugeot (1905–1915)
- Lombard (1927–1929)
- Lorraine-Dietrich (1905–1934)
- Louis Chenard (1920–1932)
- Luc Court (1899–1936)
- Lufbery (1898–c.1902)
- Lurquin-Coudert (1907–1914)
- Luxior (1912–1914)

=== M ===
- Madoz (1921)
- Maillard (1900–c.1903)
- Maison Parisienne (1897–c.1898)
- Majola (1911–1928)
- Major (1920–1923; 1932)
- Malicet et Blin (M&B, MAB) (1897–c.1903)
- Malliary (1901)
- Marathon (1953–1955)
- Marbais and Lasnier (1906)
- Marcadier (1963–1983)
- Marden (1975–1992)
- Margaria (1910–1912)
- Marguerite (1922–1928)
- Marie de Bagneux (1907)
- Marot-Gardon (1899–1904)
- Marsonetto (1957–1959; 1965–1972)
- Matford (1934–1940)
- Mathis (1919–1935; 1945–1950)
- Matra (1965–1984)
- Messier (1924–1931)
- Mia (2011-2014)
- Michel Irat (1929–1930)
- Mildé (1898–1909)
- Millot (1901–1902)
- MLB (1894–1902)
- Mochet (1924–1958)
- Mom (1906–1907)
- Monet (1920–1939)
- Monica (1971–1975)
- Monnard (1899)
- Monocar (1936–1939)
- Monotrace (1924–1930)
- Montier (1920–1934)
- Montier & Gillet (1895–1898)
- Morisse (1899–1914)
- Mors (1895–1925; 1941–1943)
- Motobloc (1901–1930)
- Mototri Contal (1907–1908)
- MPM Motors (2015-2021)
- Mutel (1902-1906)

=== N ===
- Nanceene (1900–c.1903)
- Napoleon (1903)
- Naptholette (1899)
- Nardini (1914)

=== O ===
- Obus (1907–1908)
- Octo (1921–1928)
- Oméga-Six (1922–1930)
- Otto (1900–1914)
- Ours (1906–1909)

=== P ===
- Panhard/Panhard & Levassor (1890–1967)
- Patin (1899–1900)
- Pierre Faure (1941–1947)
- Pilain (1896–1920)
- Plasson (1910)
- Poinard (1951–1953)
- Ponts-Moteurs (1912–1913)
- Populaire (1899)
- Poron (1898)
- Porthos (1906–1914)
- Prod'homme (1907–1908)
- Prosper-Lambert (1901–1906)
- Peugeot (1896)

=== Q ===
- Quo Vadis (1921–1923)

=== R ===
- Radior (1920–1922)
- Rally (1921–1933)
- Raouval (1899–1902)
- Ratier (1926–1930)
- Ravailler (1907)
- Ravel (1900–1902)
- Ravel (1923–1929)
- Rebour (1905–1908)
- Rene Bonnet (1961–1964)
- Reyonnah (1950–1954)
- Reyrol (1900–1930)
- Richard-Brasier (1902–1905)
- Robert Serf (1925–1935)
- Rochet-Schneider (1894–1932)
- Roger (1888–1896)
- Rolland-Pilain (1907–1931)
- Rolux (1938–1952)
- Rosengart (1928–1955)
- Roussel (1908–1914)
- Roussey (1949–1951)
- Rouxel (1899–1900)
- Rovin (1946–1951)
- Ruby (1910–c.1922)
- Ryjan (1920–1926)

=== S ===
- Salmson (1921–1957)
- Sandford (1923–1939)
- Santax (1920–1927)
- SARA (1923–1930)
- Sautter-Harlé (1907–1912)
- SCAP (1912–1929)
- SCAR (1906–1915)
- Scora (1974–present)
- Secqueville-Hoyau (1919–1924)
- Sénéchal (1921–1927)
- Sensaud de Lavaud (1926–1928)
- SERA (1959–1961)
- Sidéa (1912–1924)
- Sigma (1913–1928)
- Silva-Coroner (1927)
- SIMA-Violet (1924–1929)
- Simca (1935–1980)
- Simplicia (1910)
- Simplex (1919–1921)
- Sinpar (1907–1914)
- Siscart (1908–1909)
- Sixcyl (1907–1908)
- Sizaire-Berwick (1913–1927)
- Sizaire Frères (1923–1929)
- Sizaire-Naudin (1905–1921)
- Société Parisienne
- Soncin (1900–1902)
- Solanet (1921)
- Soriano-Pedroso (1919–1924)
- SOVAM (1965–1969)
- SPAG (1927–1928)
- Stabilia (1907–1930)
- Stimula (1907–1914)
- Stimula (1978–1982)
- Suère (1909–1931)
- Suncar (1980–c.1986)

=== T ===
- Talbot (1919–1932; 1979–1986)
- Talbot-Lago (1932–1959)
- Th. Schneider (1910–1931)
- Thomson (1913–1928)
- Tourey (1898)
- Tracford (1933–1935)
- Tracta (1926–1934)
- Triouleyre (1896–1898)
- Tuar (1913–1925)
- Turcat-Méry (1899–1928)
- Turgan-Foy (1899–1906)

=== U ===
- Unic (1904–1939)
- Underberg (?–?)s:Popular Science Monthly/Volume 57/October 1900/Gasoline Automobiles
- Urric (1905–1906)
- Utilis (1921–1924)

=== V ===
- Vaillant (1922–1924)
- Vallée (1895–1902)
- VELAM
- Vermorel (1908–1930 as an automobile producer)
- Vernandi (1928–1929)
- Veyrat (1990-1999)
- Villard (1925–1935)
- Vinot-Deguingand (1901–1927)
- Voisin

=== Z ===
- Zédel (1905–1920)
- Zeiller & Fournier (1920–1924)
- Zénia (1913–1924)

== Defunct microcar manufacturers ==
- Acma (1957-1961)
- Acoma mini comtesse (1974-1984)
