= Bernardet =

Bernardet may refer to:

== People ==
- Jean-Claude Bernardet (1936–2025), Brazilian film theorist, film critic, film director, screenwriter and writer of French descent
- Jules Bernardet (born 2000), French slalom canoeist
- Vincent Bernardet (born 1981), French football player

== Other uses ==
- Automobiles Bernardet, a French former car manufacturer
