= Millot (disambiguation) =

Millot was a French automobile built by the Millot brothers in 1896.

Millot may also refer to:

People:

- Adolphe Philippe Millot (1857 – 1921), French painter, lithographer and entomologist
- Catherine Millot (born 1944), French Lacanian psychoanalyst and author, professor.
- Charles Millot (circa 1717 – 1769), cleric
- Charles Millot (1921 – 2003), actor
- Charles-Théodore Millot (1829 – 1889), French general
- Claude-François-Xavier Millot (1726 – 1785), French churchman and historian
- Claude Dubois-Millot, sales director
- Éric Millot (12 December 1968), French figure skater
- Estelle Millot (born 1993), a member of France women's national water polo team
- Jean-François Millot (born 1944), French sprint canoer
- Jordan Millot (born 1990), French professional footballer
- Nicolas Millot (d. 1590 or later), French composer
- Vincent Millot (born 1986), French tennis player.

Other uses:

- Léon Millot, red grape used for wine
