= Lufbery =

Lufbery, often misspelt Lufberry, Luffbery or Luffberry, may refer to:

- Lufbery automobile, built in France, 1898-1902
- Raoul Lufbery, French-American air ace of World War I
- Lufbery circle, an aerial maneuver incorrectly associated with Raoul Lufbery
