= Alma (French automobile) =

Automobile manufacturer

Établissements Alma
- Trade name: Alma
- Company type: Private
- Industry: Automotive
- Founded: 1926
- Founder: Henri Vaslin
- Defunct: 1929
- Fate: Ceased operations
- Headquarters: Courbevoie, Seine, France
- Key people: Henri Vaslin (engineer)
- Products: Automobiles (Alma Six)

Alma was a small French automobile manufacturer that operated in Courbevoie, Seine, from 1926 to 1929. The marque is remembered for a compact six-cylinder model known as the Alma Six (sometimes styled Alma6), engineered by the aeronautical engineer Henri Vaslin.

== History ==
Établissements Alma was established in 1926 at Courbevoie with the intention of offering a refined small car using a proprietary engine rather than a bought-in power unit. Production remained very limited and ended by 1929 amid the contraction of France’s niche-marque sector.

== Models ==
Alma Six (1926–1929)

A two-seat coupé/voiturette powered by a proprietary inline six of about 1.64 L (≈1640–1642 cc).

== See also ==
- List of automobile manufacturers of France
