= Alamagny =

Former French automaker

Alamagny is a former French automaker. It is remembered because of a prototype vehicle that was exhibited at various venues in France during 1947 and 1948.

== History ==
Marcel Alamagny was an engineer who by 1947 had developed a prototype for a small four-wheeled car inspired by a “car of the future” project dreamt up in 1934 by Gabriel Voisin. Alamagny pursued the idea further with a Pushmi-pullyu style vehicle having two visually identical front ends and no rear end. Two of the four wheels shared the axle in the middle of the vehicle that was powered by a small four-cylinder water-cooled 569 cc engine from the Simca 5, mounted transversely.

At each end was a single wheel which steered, giving the vehicle a turning circle of 4.25 meters (13.9 ft). The driver and his passengers each sat with their backs to the engine, and therefore also to each other, giving the passengers a view through the back window. Despite the look of the car, the gear box was conventionally configured so that driving always took place from the same end.

The vehicle was 3,420 mm (135 in) long and 1,600 mm (63 in) wide. With four people on board a top speed of 85 km/h (53 mph) was quoted.

In 1948 the prototype was presented to the SIA (Society of Automobile Engineers), but no further development took place. The prototype was preserved by Amédée Gordini.
