= Aerocarene =

Automobile developed in France

The Aérocarène 700 was a small automobile developed in France and first exhibited at the Paris Motor Show at the end of October 1947.

The vehicle was developed during the previous year by two engineers called Desbenoît and Bodu. It was a streamlined three-wheeled coupé which had no doors. The top slid back to grant access to the passenger compartment. Spats enclosed the front wheels, on top of which the headlights were mounted. The headlights and their spats were turned with the steering of the wheels.

It had a 684 cc 2 strokes aircooled engine and a 4 speed Cotal gearbox. The Aérocarène 700 weighed less than 300 kg. The Aérocarène's maximum speed was 140km/h.

The vehicle's appearance at the Paris Motor Show was supported by the production of a sales brochure, but the project backers had failed to win round the government representatives. Under the dirigiste governments that ruled in France in the years directly following the Vichy experience automakers needed the authorisation of government to build cars. The absence of such authorisation made it impossible to purchase materials, and accordingly the Aérocarène project had to be abandoned.
