= Siscart =

The Siscart was a French automobile manufactured from 1908 until 1909. The company showed three cars at the 1908 Paris Salon - a two-seater 8 hp model, a 12 hp "type course", and a side-entrance 12 hp phaeton.
