= Stabilia (automobile) =

Automobiles Stabilia
- Industry: Automotive
- Founded: 1907
- Defunct: 1930
- Headquarters: Neuilly-sur-Seine, France (initially); Asnières-sur-Seine, France (by 1920)
- Products: Cars

Automobiles Stabilia was an automobile manufacturer based on Neuilly-sur-Seine, Paris between 1907 and 1930. Although the name of the company changed, the cars were still branded as Stabilia. The company specialised in lower “underslung” cars featuring a special patented type of suspension.

== History ==
Édouard Vrard, who had previously worked for Léon Bollée and De Dion-Bouton, prepared a prototype to be presented at the Paris Motor Show in 1904. However, it wasn’t until 1907 that Vrard founded his own automotive company, under the name Automobiles Stabilia, located at Neuilly-sur-Seine. Later, in 1911, the company was renamed to Giraldy et Vrard, though the cars were still badged as Stabilia. The manufacturing expanded to also take place in Asnières-sur-Seiner, and once again, in 1920, was renamed to Vrard et Cie. later, during the 1920s with only the production site in Asnières-sur-Seiner, production started declining, until it ended altogether in 1930.

== Cars ==
The first production model, produced in 1908, was powered by a four-cylinder 2200cc engine. The car featured the signature “underslung” chassis (With the leaf suspension and axles protruding outwards over the chassis elements, instead of the usual arrangement of the chassis elements over the suspension and axles). This provided a lower body that would remain as the key element of appeal of Stabilia. Between 1912 and 1914 the manufacturer broadened its range, offering cars of 1500cc, 1700cc and 2700cc engine displacement.

Production stopped after the war, but soon resumed in 1919, followed by the debut of a 15HP 4-cylinder powered car with 3168cc of displacement, and the choice between a 2,850mm or 3,350mm (112 inches and 132 inches respectively) wheelbase. The bare chassis itself was priced at 20,000 francs. There was also a 14HP model with a 2800cc engine and four speed transmission. Stabilia re-appeared again in the 1924 Paris Motor show, attracting comments of the car’s low-slung chassis. Between 1924 and 1926 Stabilia was offering cars with bought in engines of 1500cc or 2000cc displacement.

From 1927, a few smaller models were marketed from Automobiles Gobron as Stabilias.

The company’s last model, produced in 1930, was powered by a straight-eight engine, of just 1400cc. Shortly thereafter, the company went defunct competely.

== Reference, sources and notes ==
- Harald Linz, Halwart Schrader: Die Internationale Automobil-Enzyklopädie. United Soft Media Verlag, München 2008, ISBN 978-3-8032-9876-8.
- George Nick Georgano (Chefredakteur): The Beaulieu Encyclopedia of the Automobile. Volume 3: P–Z. Fitzroy Dearborn Publishers, Chicago 2001, ISBN 1-57958-293-1. (englisch)
- George Nick Georgano: Autos. Encyclopédie complète. 1885 à nos jours. Courtille, Paris 1975. (französisch)
