= Damaizin & Pujos =

The Damaizin & Pujos was a French automobile manufactured only in 1910. The company built chassis with a patented constant-mesh gear change, and may also have been known as "Dux".

It is documented that Frederic Jean-Baptiste Damaizin and Jean Pujos registered a patent for a new system of manual and reverse gears in March 1910.
