= Colda =

French automobile manufactured 1921–22

The Colda was a French automobile manufactured from 1921 until 1922. The company was based in Paris; the cars were built with an 1847cc four-cylinder engine produced by Sergant.
