= La Ponette =

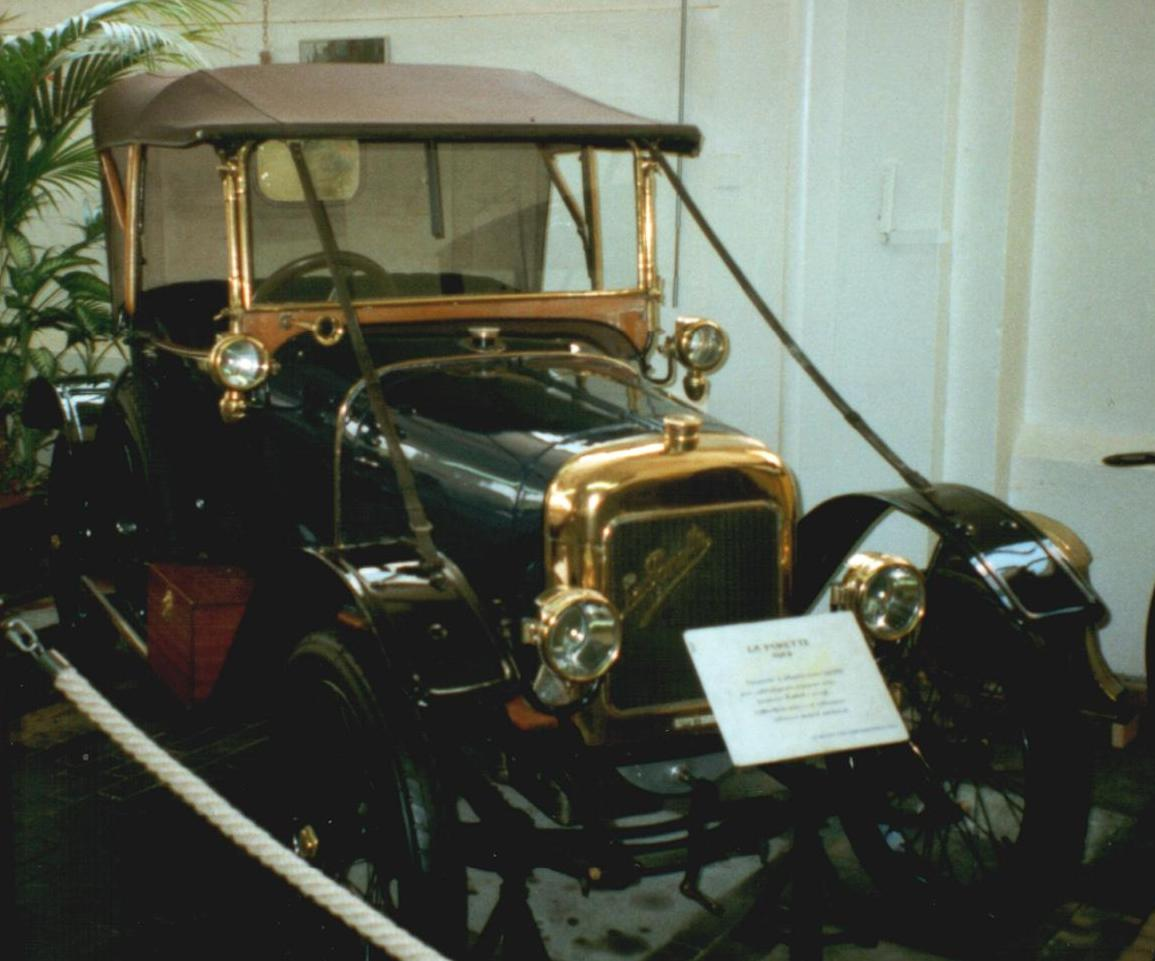
La Ponette

The La Ponette was a French automobile manufactured from 1909 until 1925. The small car builder began production with a single-cylinder 697 cc car which was similar to a small Renault. This was followed in 1911 by a four-cylinder 1592 cc Ballot-engined vehicle, which was built until 1920. A few minor models were also made using various proprietary engines. The parent company, the Société des Automobiles La Ponette, collapsed in 1925, and the marque ceased production.
