= Marbais and Lasnier =

French manufacturer of automobiles

- Industry: Automotive
- Founded: 1906
- Defunct: 1906
- Headquarters: France
- Products: Automobiles

Marbais et Lasnier was a French manufacturer of automobiles.

== History ==
The company both began and ended production of automobiles in 1906.

== Vehicles ==
Different models were on offer. The smallest model was the 5 CV, with a single-cylinder engine. The largest was the 30 CV with a four-cylinder engine and chain drive.

== Bibliography ==
- Harald H. Linz, Halwart Schrader: Die Internationale Automobil-Enzyklopädie. Munich: United Soft Media Verlag, 2008. ISBN 978-3-8032-9876-8. (in German)
- George Nick Georgano (ed.): The Beaulieu Encyclopedia of the Automobile Volume 2. Chicago: G. O. Fitzroy Dearborn Publishers, 2001. ISBN 1-57958-293-1.
- George Nick Georgano, Thorkil Ry Andersen, et al. Tr. Jacqueline Heymann. Autos. Encyclopédie complète. 1885 à nos jours. 2nd ed. Paris: Courtille, 1977. OCLC 319757407 (in French)
