= Soriano-Pedroso =

French automobile, manufactured 1919–1924

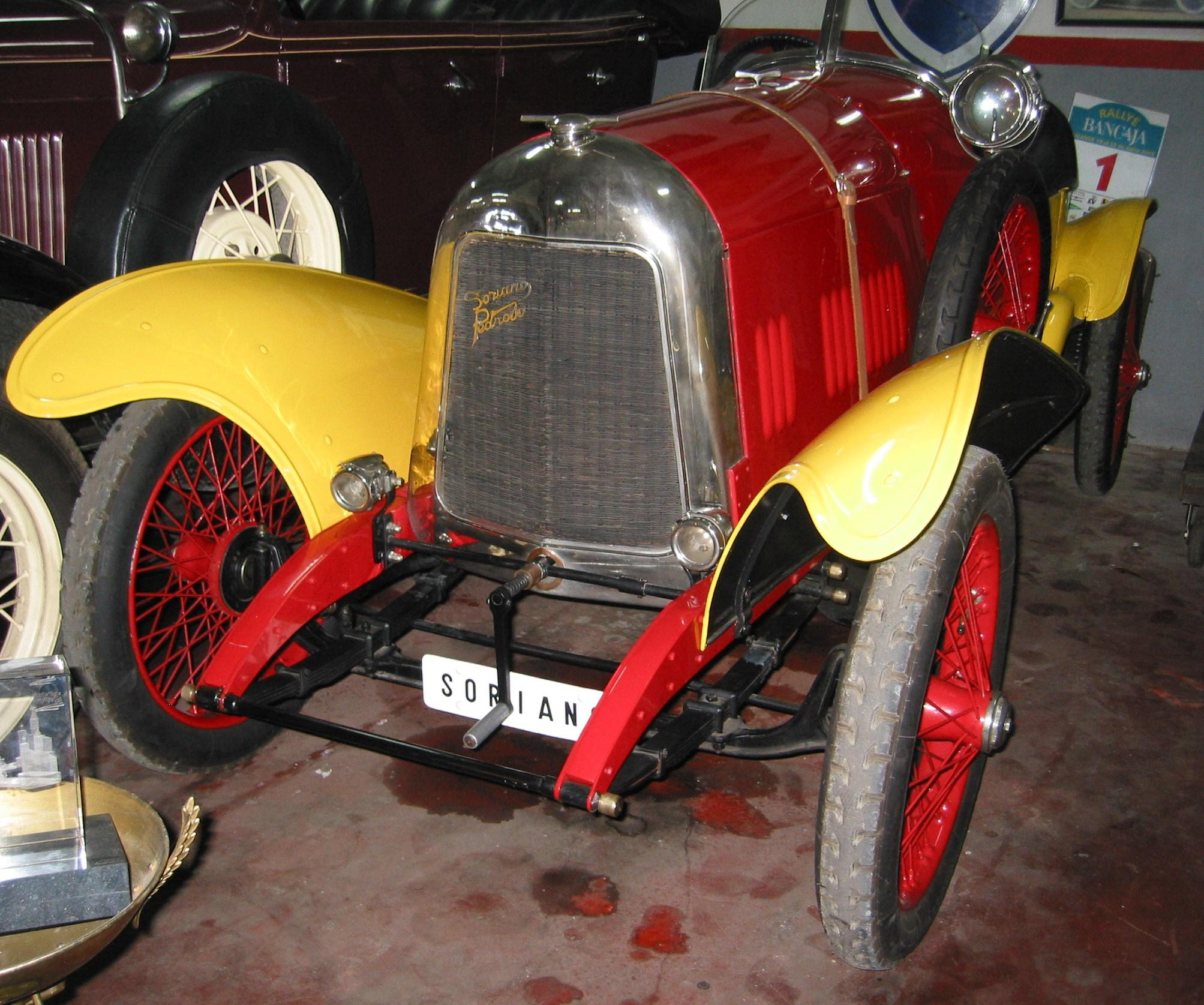
Soriano-Pedroso 1920

The Soriano-Pedroso was a French automobile manufactured in Biarritz from 1919 until 1924.

Built by two Spaniards the Marques de San Carlos de Pedroso and the Marques de Ivanrey Ricardo Soriano Sholtz von Hermensdorff, the original models were Ballot (automobile)-engined 1,131 cubic centimetres (69.0 cubic inches) and 1,590 cc (97 cu in) cars. The men next built a 902 cc (55.0 cu in) Ruby-engined cyclecar, and designed the prototype for a straight-eight; their main product, however, was marine engines.

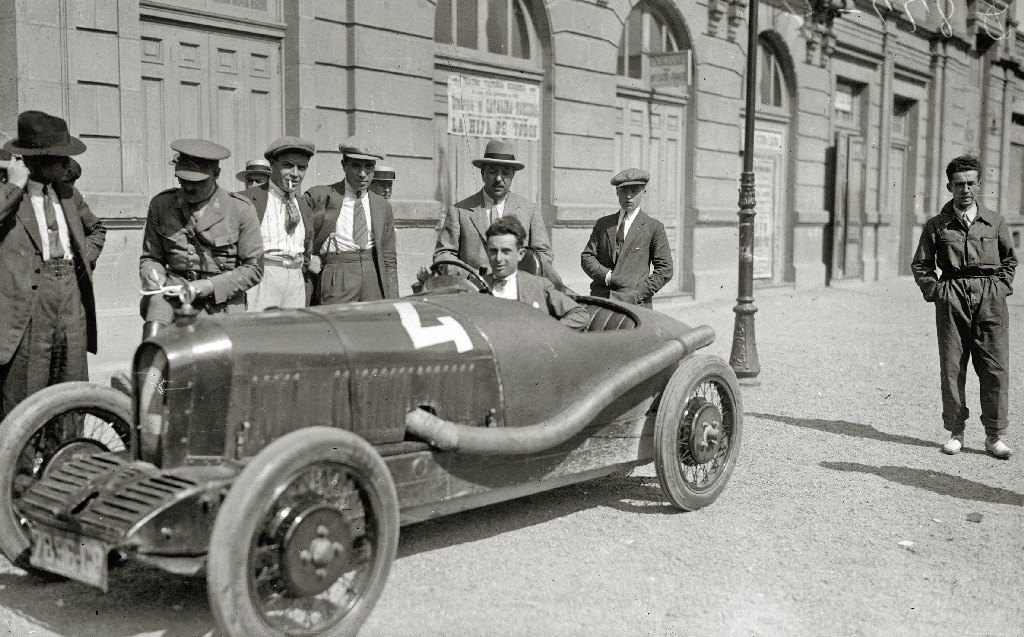
Jean Graf in a Soriano-Pedroso at the 1925 San Sebastián Grand Prix.
