= Robert Serf =

Automobiles Robert Serf
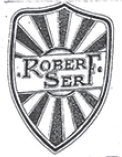
- Founded: 1925
- Defunct: 1942
- Headquarters: Colombey-les-Belles, France (till 1935); Nancy-Vendeuvre France(from 1935)
- Key people: Georges Didier (business founder); Robert Serf (car creator)
- Products: Automobiles

Automobiles Robert Serf was a French automobile manufacturer active between 1925 and 1935.

== History ==
Georges Didier established a small automobile business at Colombey-les-Belles, not far from Toul, concentrating on Ford cars and Fordson tractors. In 1925 he started to manufacture automobiles, designed by a man named Robert Serf, whose name was given to the cars. Production ended in 1935 when the business relocated a short distance to the east, to Vandoeuvre, a quarter of Nancy. The business existed till approximately 1942 which was the year in which Dider died, although Robert Serf himself was still working in his own automotive workshop at Nancy until the 1970s.

== Cars ==
A small 4CV cycle car was listed from 1927.

The first "proper" car was also the manufacturer's most successful. It used as 1470cc (7 HP/CV) side-valve 4-cylinder engine developed in-house. The range of bodies offered included a sports-car, a touring car, saloons/sedans and a commercial version which, despite sharing the profile of a saloon/sedan, incorporated a tailgate at the back. Other sources mention a "petit camion" (small truck) version. In rural eastern France the old carriage trade was still alive, and the bodies for Robert Serf automobiles were constructed by small-scale local coach-builders.

Robert Serf exhibited at the 22nd Paris Motor Show where they took the opportunity to announce a new grill for their 7CV model.

About 70 of these cars were made.

A 4CV model followed in 1932, with a 600cc 2-cylinder 2-stroke engine and offering space for two people. About 10 of these were built.

In 1935 the manufacturer exhibited a front wheel drive prototype with the same small engine, but this vehicle never went into production.

== Reading list ==
- Harald Linz, Halwart Schrader: Die Internationale Automobil-Enzyklopädie. United Soft Media Verlag, München 2008, ISBN 978-3-8032-9876-8.
- George Nick Georgano (Chefredakteur): The Beaulieu Encyclopedia of the Automobile. Volume 3: P–Z. Fitzroy Dearborn Publishers, Chicago 2001, ISBN 1-57958-293-1. (englisch)
