= Cochotte =

French automobile

The Cochotte was a French automobile manufactured only in 1899. An untidy-looking voiturette, it was powered by an exposed water-cooled engine which was mounted at the front of the vehicle.
