= Marie de Bagneux =

The Marie de Bagneux was a French automobile manufactured in Bordeaux only in 1907. A single-seat three-wheeler designed by M. Marie de Bagneux, the belt-driven car weighed 100 kg (220 lb), and was powered by a 1¼ De Dion engine.
