= Societé Générale des Voitures Automobiles Otto =

The Societé Générale des Voitures Automobiles Otto of Paris manufactured the Otto car from 1900 to 1914, and the F.L. from 1909 to 1914.

== Otto ==
The Otto part of the name was because the Compagnie Française de Moteurs à Gaz held the license for the Otto stationary engine for France. Early gas-engined cars were 2-cylinders of varying outputs between 6 and 12 horsepower. The engines were either vertically- or horizontally-opposed. In 1901, a 20 hp 4-cylinder model was added. By 1903, a 10 hp single-cylinder model was on offer. This model was entered via the rear of the car and engine speed was controlled via a variable lift exhaust valve.

== F.L. ==
In 1909, the Otto company announced the arrival of a new car, the F.L., as an additional marque of the company. This car featured a 12/16 hp monoblock 2-liter engine of four cylinders. Unusually, the engine, flywheel, and gearbox were all a single connected unit. Later, a 6-cylinder engine was added, with the same cylinder dimensions, which yielded an engine slightly larger than three liters.

The origin of the name is unclear, though a likely explanation is the pronunciation (eff ell) is supposed to be like that of the Eiffel Tower.

== Culmen ==
Another related marque was the Culmen.
