= Monotrace (automobile) =

French Automobile Manufacturer

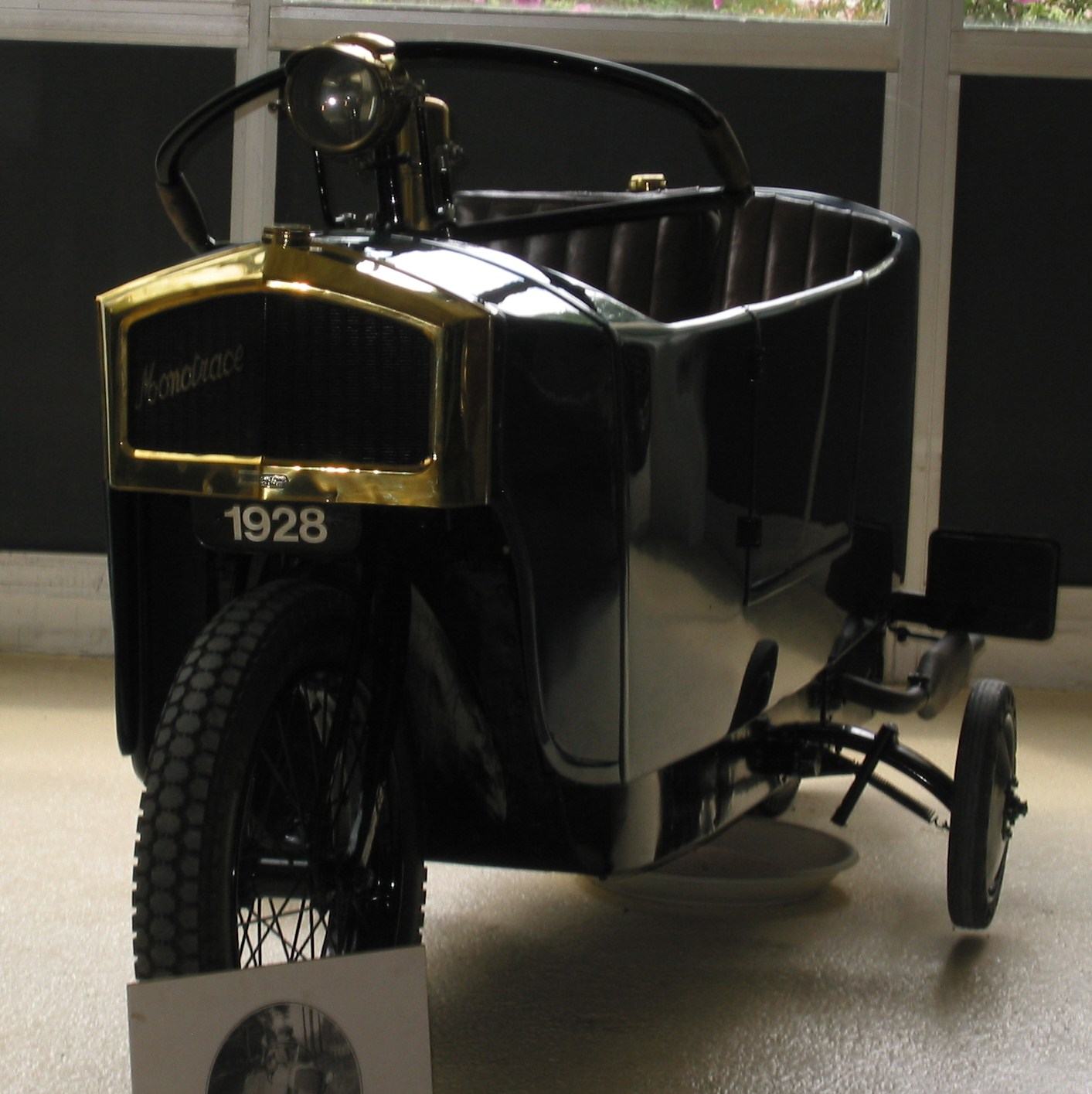
Monotrace (1928)

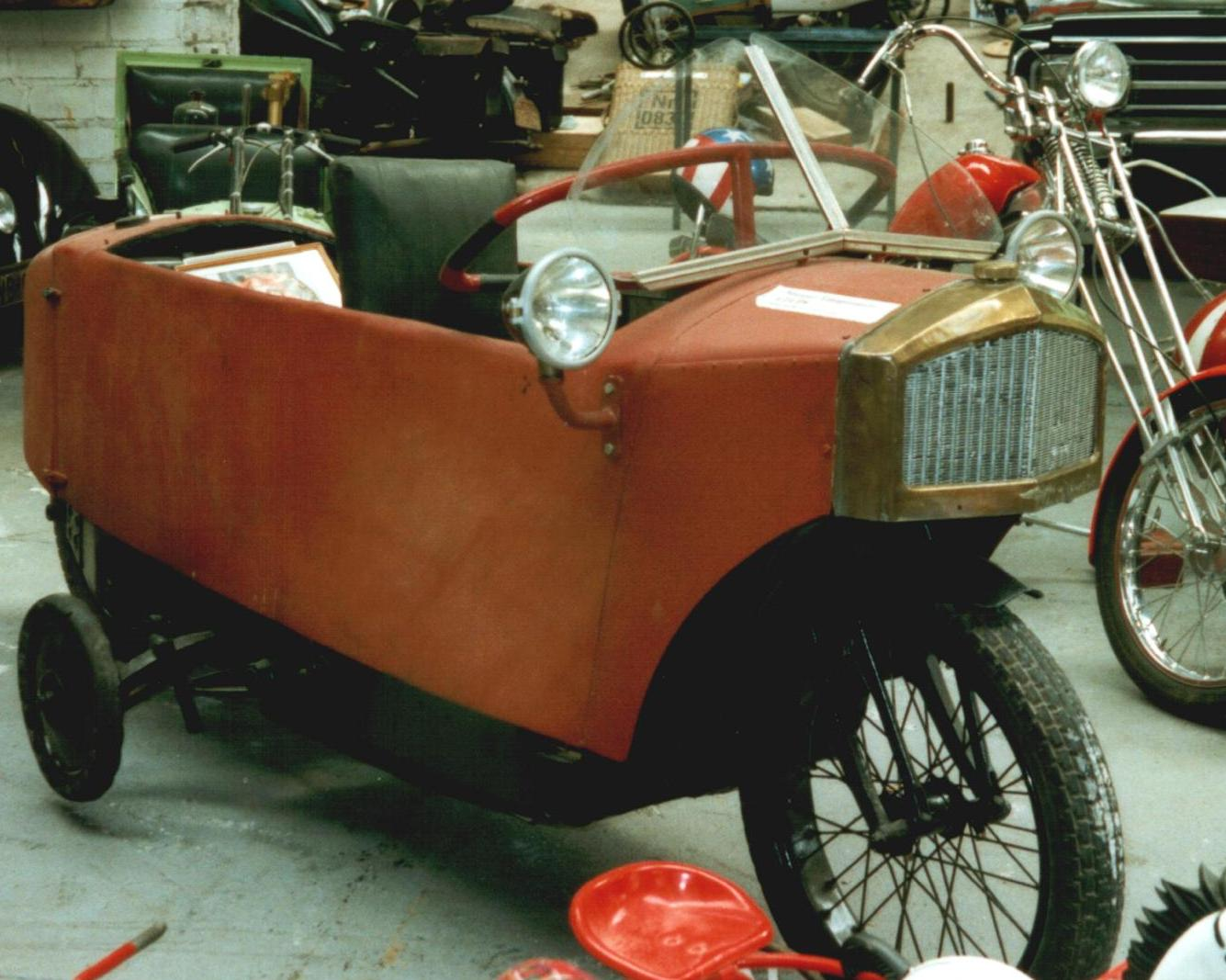
Inspiration came from the Mauser "Einspurauto" of 1923

Établissements Monotrace S.A. (previously Ateliers du Rond Point) was a French automobile manufacturer, based (from 1926) at Courbevoie, on the edge of Paris, from 1924 till 1930. Although it was presented as a type of automobile, the Monotrace was in some respects more like a motor cycle than a conventional motor car.

== The company ==
Ateliers du Rond Point of Saint-Étienne began producing automobiles in 1924. The cars carried the name Monotrace. In 1926 production was taken over by Établissements Monotrace S.A. at Courbevoie. That same year Joseph-August Roten, whose background was in engineering, took over the leadership of the business. Production ended in 1930.

== The cars ==
The company's only model was based on the Mauser Einspurauto of 1923. It used two principal wheels, one behind the other, but with a second set of side-wheels which prevented the vehicle from falling over when stationary, but which folded up when the vehicle was traveling. The water cooled single cylinder motor had a capacity of 510cc and delivered an approximate maximum 12HP, delivered via a three speed transmission, using a chain drive, to the back wheel. There was space for two, positioned one behind the other.

The manufacturer took a stand at the 20th Paris Motor Show in October 1925. At this time the price quoted for the vehicle was 8,900 francs.

The range was broadened in 1926 with the introduction of a "delivery van" version of the Monotrace, and in 1929 a single seater sports model was added.

== Reading list ==
- Harald Linz, Halwart Schrader: Die Internationale Automobil-Enzyklopädie. United Soft Media Verlag, München 2008, ISBN 978-3-8032-9876-8. (German)
- George Nick Georgano (editor): The Beaulieu Encyclopedia of the Automobile. Volume 3: P–Z. Fitzroy Dearborn Publishers, Chicago 2001, ISBN 1-57958-293-1. (English)
- George Nick Georgano: Autos. Encyclopédie complète. 1885 à nos jours. Courtille, Paris 1975. (French)
