= Silva-Coroner =

French automobile manufacturer

The Silva-Coroner was a French automobile manufactured only in 1927. Built by a M. Silva-Coroner, they were overhead valve straight-eight-engined cars of 2490 cubic centre metre capacity.
