= Nardini (automobile) =

The Nardini was a French automobile manufactured only in 1914. A light car, it was built by an M. Nardini and designed to be sold on the English market. The cars were powered by Altos engines of 1244 cc and 1779 cc.
