= Automobiles Lambert =

French automobile manufacturer

Lambert
- Company type: Private
- Industry: Automotive
- Founded: 1926
- Founder: Germain Lambert
- Defunct: 1953
- Fate: Ceased production
- Headquarters: Mâcon, France
- Area served: France
- Key people: Germain Lambert
- Products: Automobiles, sports cars, cyclecars

Lambert was a French automobile manufacturer established by Germain Lambert in 1926 at Mâcon. In commercial terms, it never progressed beyond marginal viability and it withdrew from auto-making towards the end of 1953.

The company was in no way connected and should not be confused with the earlier Paris based business A. Lambert & Cie which had produced cars between 1902 and 1906.

== History ==
Lambert's first car, in 1926, featured an engine bought in from Ruby. A front-wheel drive model with the same Ruby engine followed in 1931. From 1933 a front-wheel drive single-cylinder cycle car was offered. During the war, Lambert may have worked on electric vehicles. Germain Lambert is remembered chiefly as a skilled mechanic and enthusiastic participant in motor racing. He produced a few cars between 1926 and 1936, after which he appears to have lost interest in auto-making for the rest of the decade.

The Mâcon based Lambert business relocated in 1931 to Rheims which was a centre for motor racing in the 1930s. Soon after this Germain Lambert was running his own auto-repair workshop not too far away at Sainte-Menehould, and the business appears to have prospered allowing him in due course to return his attention to more exciting, if less financially stable, ventures. Lambert was still working out of his premises near Sainte-Menehould in 1940 at the time of the German invasion undertaking specialist jobs in connection with the auto-business and also components for saw-mills. Fuel for civilian use rapidly disappeared and Lambert found it inappropriate to travel the region on public transport to deliver small items to customers, so in 1940 he came up with a design for a cycle car and constructed two prototypes. The emphasis, necessarily, was on light weight construction, with a tubular frame and timber superstructure. Overall the device weighed only 150 kg when empty. However, it was necessary to add 75 kg for the 24 volt batteries in order to power the ½ hp engine lurking somewhere under the bodywork. Rubber and tires being unavailable, the unsprung wheels were wrapped around with multiple layers of bandage which made for a firm ride. The vehicle could move only slowly, and managed a range of very roughly 20 kilometers (12 miles) between charges. These were troubled times, and Lambert was able to have his cycle car homologated for sale, but he soon rejected the idea, ostensibly because he could not bring himself to produce such a slow and ugly "car".

Lambert moved again, this time to Giromagny in 1946.

In May 1948 he unveiled a strikingly original looking sports coupe which five months later he exhibited at the Paris Motor Show. The light sports coupe first seen at Paris was the first of a succession of similar cars powered by a 1,087 cc engine still supplied by Ruby. At the end of the war with volume production of fighter-planes less of a priority in western Europe, the newly developed aluminium business was looking for new opportunities. Steel was in short supply: the new Lambert model was one of a number of cars appearing in France at this time with an all-aluminium body embellished with large wings that covered the rear wheels. The transmission and mechanically operated brakes were conventional despite the car's elaborate body-work. The Lambert that appeared at the 1948 motor show was itself never developed beyond prototype stage, but it provided the basis for a "competition" version followed in 1951 by a cabriolet branded as the Simplicia and a Torino coupe. A Luxor cabriolet appeared in 1952 and several were sold, but by now the business was heavily indebted. Lambert found himself required by his bankers to sell his workshop near Belfort, his machine tools, his inventory of raw materials and even his house. By the end of 1953 the business had ceased to exist.

Despite its commercial failure, the company's final years were marked by notable competition successes, a Lambert 1100 being placed second in its class at the 1951 Bol d'Or race with further racing successes following in 1952 and 1953.
