= Delfosse =

Delfosse is a surname of French origin. Notable people with the surname include:

- Ana Delfosse (1931–2017), Argentinian race-car driver
- Charles Delfosse (1913–unknown), Belgian sailor
- Noël Delfosse (1801–1858), Belgian lawyer
- Sébastien Delfosse (born 1982), Belgian professional road bicycle racer
- Te'Yala Delfosse, American basketball player
