= Fonlupt =

The Fonlupt was a French automobile manufactured in Levallois from 1920 until 1922. The company made a small number of the 1539 cc 10 hp Sport and the 10 hp 2155 cc Ville, both of which were four-cylinders; they also built an eight-cylinder of 4310 cc. All three engines had ohc.
