= Simplex (French automobile manufacturer) =

- Industry: Automotive
- Founded: 1919
- Defunct: 1921
- Headquarters: France

Simplex is an automobile manufacturer that existed briefly, in France, between 1919 and 1921.

The name Simplex was used during the early years of the twentieth century by a number of automobile manufacturers including one each in the Netherlands and England, and by (at least) two auto-makers in North America. The French Simplex company was not connected with these.

== The car ==
Simplex took a stand at the Paris Motor Show in October 1919 and exhibited a light “voiturette” style car featuring a single cylinder horizontal motor of 735cc. The motor was balanced by an imaginatively configured longitudinal counter-weight which was intended to limit engine vibrations.

The wheelbase was a relatively modest 2,300 mm (90.6 in). Front brakes were included.

The car’s “Bull-nose” style radiator is reminiscent of the pre-war Morris Oxford.

== Sources and notes ==
- David Burgess Wise, The Illustrated Encyclopedia of Automobiles, New Burlington Books, 1979, ISBN 0 906286 16 6
