= Société des ingénieurs de l'automobile =

Engineering organization of France

French Society of Automobile Engineers
- Société des ingénieurs de l'automobile
- SIA logo
- Abbreviation: SIA
- Formation: 1927; 99 years ago
- Type: Learned society
- Location: France
- President: Luc Marbach
- CEO: Frédéric Charon
- Website: www.sia.fr

The French Society of Automotive Engineers (French: Société des ingénieurs de l'automobile, SIA) is an association of French engineers, managers, technicians and automotive professionals working in the automotive sector in France.The association is regulated under the loi de 1901. Its main goal is to promote innovation and technical exchange between automotive professionals.

Traditionally, the association president is alternatively proposed by the administration council of each main French car manufacturer, Renault and Peugeot. The Société des ingénieurs de l'automobile is a member of the FISITA, as is the Society of Automotive Engineers, and the EAEC (European Automotive Engineers Cooperation).
