= Prod'homme =

The Prod'homme was a French automobile manufactured at Ivry-Port from 1907 to 1908. The cars were powered by 18 hp opposed-piston engines.
