= Maillard (automobile) =

The Maillard was a French automobile manufactured from 1900 until around 1903. Two models, a 6 hp and a 10 hp, were available; they were upgraded to 8 hp and 12 hp in 1901. Maillard vehicles were also built in Belgium under the name Aquilas.
