= Reyonnah =

Automobile manufacturer

Reyonnah is a former French automaker. It produced 16 cycle-car style vehicles between 1951 and 1954.

== The name ==
The company was established by a Parisian called Robert Hannoyer. Its name was the ananym of its founder's name.

== The product ==
The only model was a small four-wheeled vehicle with a relatively wide track at the front and a narrow track at the rear. The vehicle offered space for two, seated one behind the other, following the same basic lay-out as the better known Messerschmitt “Bubble-car”. Weather protection came from a hood which could be partially opened to expose only the driver to the weather (in a style dubbed "a la Milord" by at least one commentator) or fully folded back if the passenger in the back also wished to travel roofless. A single-cylinder engine from AMC or Ydral of 175 cc or 125 cc powered the rear axle via a three speed manual gear box and a chain drive mechanism.

An unusual feature of the front wheels was that when parked their supporting structure could be folded towards the centre of the car so that the parked vehicles had a curiously raised nose but a front track (corresponding in this case with the vehicle's overall width) of only 750 mm, enabling it to park in a space little wider than a motorbike slot. For travelling, the front wheels had to be folded out, increasing the front track to a more stable 1320 mm.

== Performance ==
Hannoyer's enthusiasm kept his small car alive and appearing at the Paris Motor Show for at least three years from 1950 till 1952 during which the car failed to attract customers in the numbers for which he had hoped. Five days after the salon doors closed in October 1952 he took a special light-weight Reyonnah 175 to the Montlhéry circuit of which he had previously made a study. The vehicle peaked at a speed above 100 km/h (63 mph) and achieved an average speed of 96.67 km/h (59 mph) during a non-stop run of 50 kilometers (31 mi).

== Sources ==
- G.N. Georgano: Autos. Encyclopédie complète. 1885 à nos jours. Courtille, 1975 (French)
