= Roussel (automobile) =

The Roussel was a French automobile manufactured from 1908 to 1914. The company produced light cars, voiturettes, and cabs at a factory in Charleville-Mézières; it offered four-cylinder 10 and 12 hp engines.
