= Ravailler =

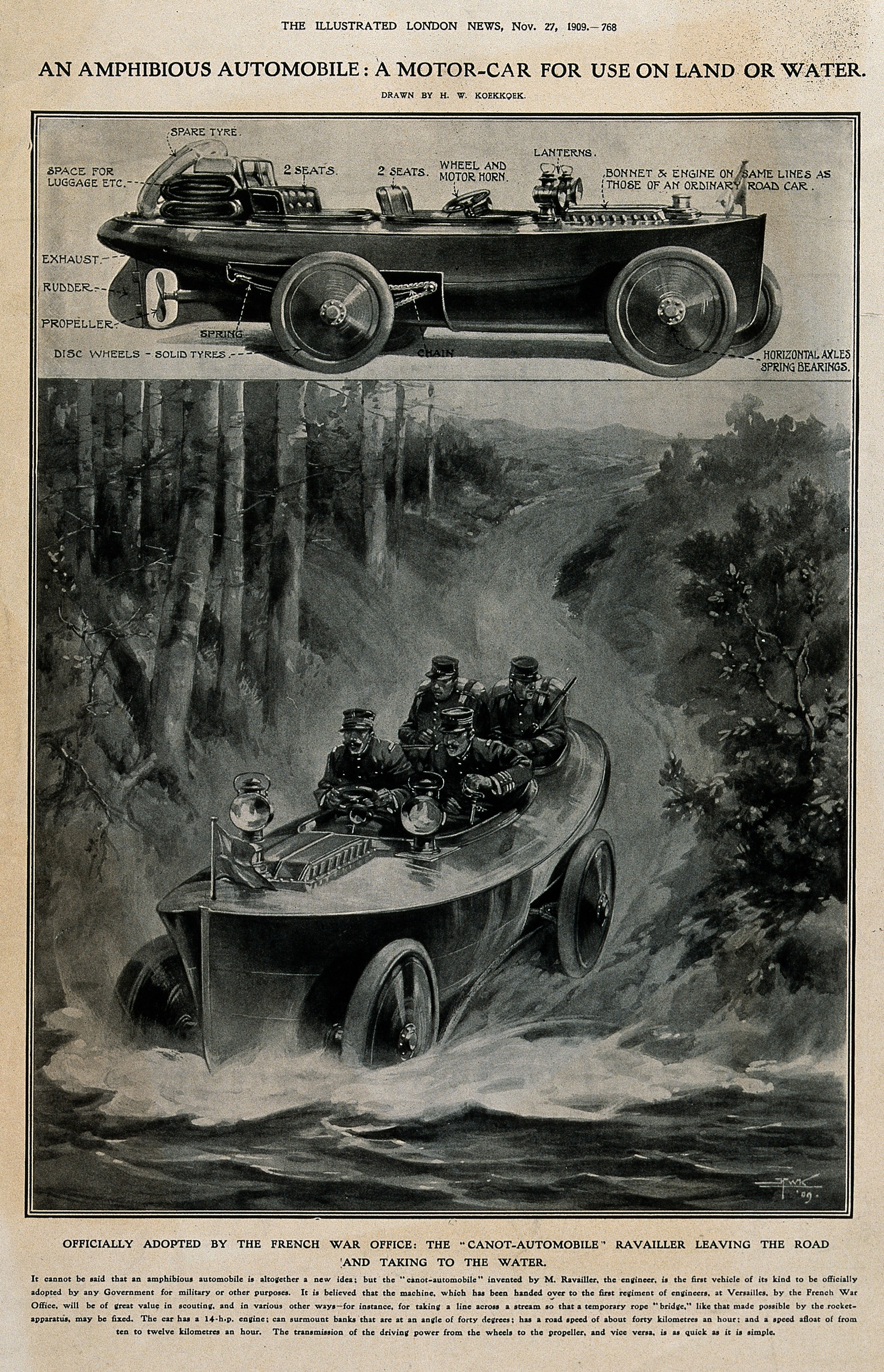

Overview
- Type: Amphibious vehicle
- Production: 1907
- Designer: Jules Reveillier

Body and chassis
- Layout: Front Engine, RWD

Powertrain
- Engine: 896 cubic centimetres (54.7 cu in; 0.896 L) Inline 2
- Power output: 20 brake horsepower (20 PS; 15 kW); 33 newton-metres (24 lbf⋅ft)
- Transmission: 1-speed Direct-drive

Dimensions
- Curb weight: 600.0 kilograms (1,322.8 lb)

The Ravailler was a French automobile manufactured only in 1907. Possibly the first successful amphibious car, it was a 20 hp vehicle complete with steel hull, chain drive, and disc wheels with solid tires.
