= Automobiles Claveau =

Claveau is a former French automaker. The company began manufacturing cars in Paris in 1923. By 1956 (possibly several years earlier), the company had ceased production. Émile Claveau was recognized more as an innovator of experimental and sometimes inspirational engine designs rather than as a manufacturer of cars for sale.

== History ==
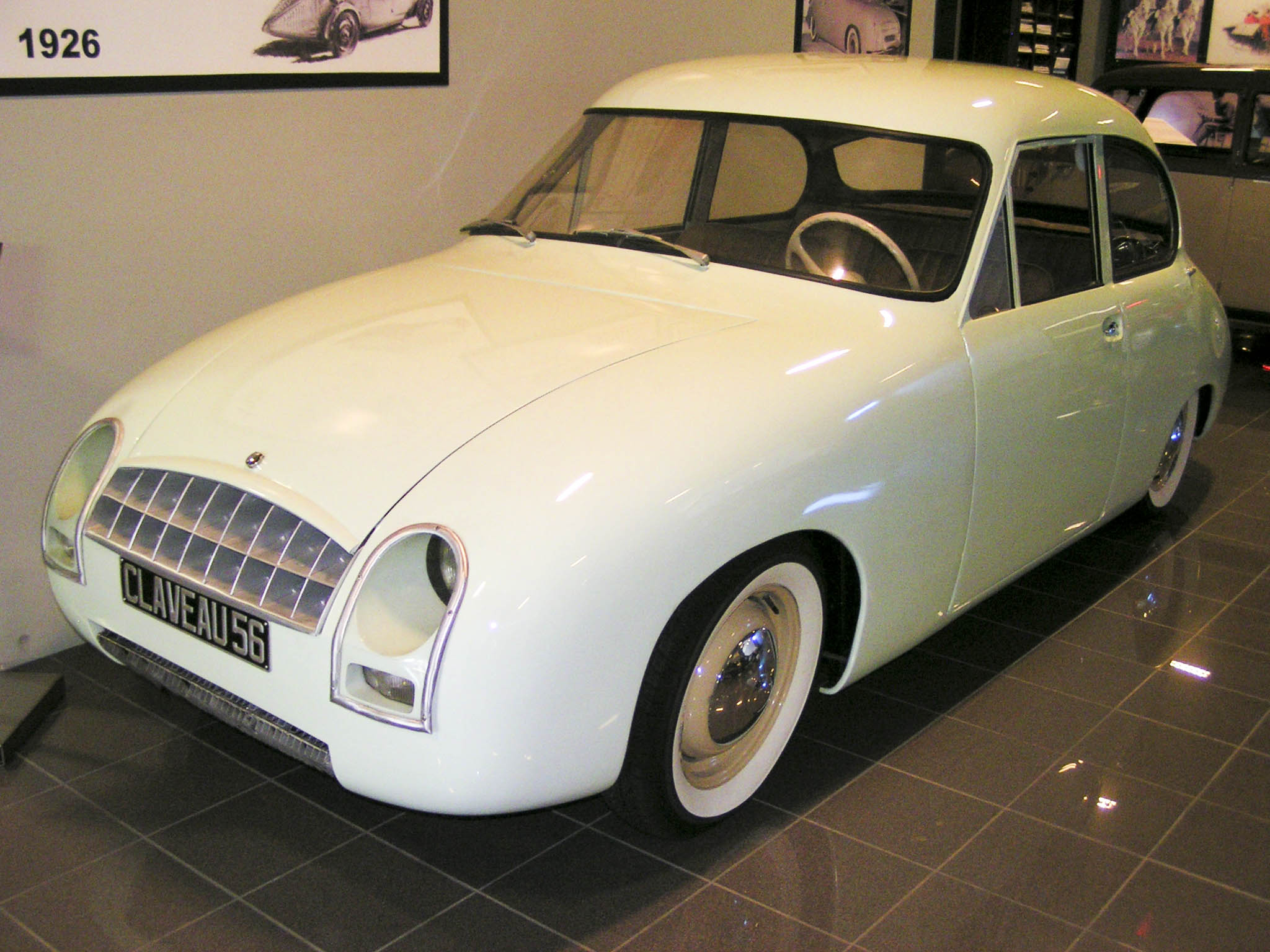
1956 Claveau

Claveau's first “4CV” model featured an aerodynamic silhouette and was offered as a sedan/saloon or as a cabriolet roadster. A choice of rear-mounted engines was offered, either an air-cooled four-cylinder unit or a two-cylinder two-stroke unit. In 1930, a model was offered with a front-mounted engine and front-wheel drive.

After the war Claveau began promoting his new “Claveau Déscartes”, with an advanced 2292 cc 85 hp V8 motor, a five speed gear box and front wheel drive. Claveau presented a 1 to 5 scale model of the Descartes in a perspex box at the 1947 Paris Motor Show.

In 1956 a prototype for a “5CV” Claveau model, fitted with a DKW engine, was publicized. It is on display at the Tampa Bay Automobile Museum.https://www.tbauto.org/project/claveau-56-1956-france/
