= Monocar =

The Monocar was a French automobile manufactured in Paris from 1936 until 1939. It was a small single-seater three-wheeler, and was powered by a 173 cc two-stroke engine.
