= Madoz =

The Madoz was a French automobile manufactured only in 1921. A light cyclecar powered by a 175 cc two-stroke engine and sometimes known as the "Propulcycle", it was a product of Nanterre.
