= Electricar =

The Electricar was a French electric car manufactured from 1920 to 1921. An urban car, it used a ½hp electric engine manufactured by a M. Couaillet of Paris. It was a single-seat three-wheeler with a single front wheel.
