= Radior =

French automobile

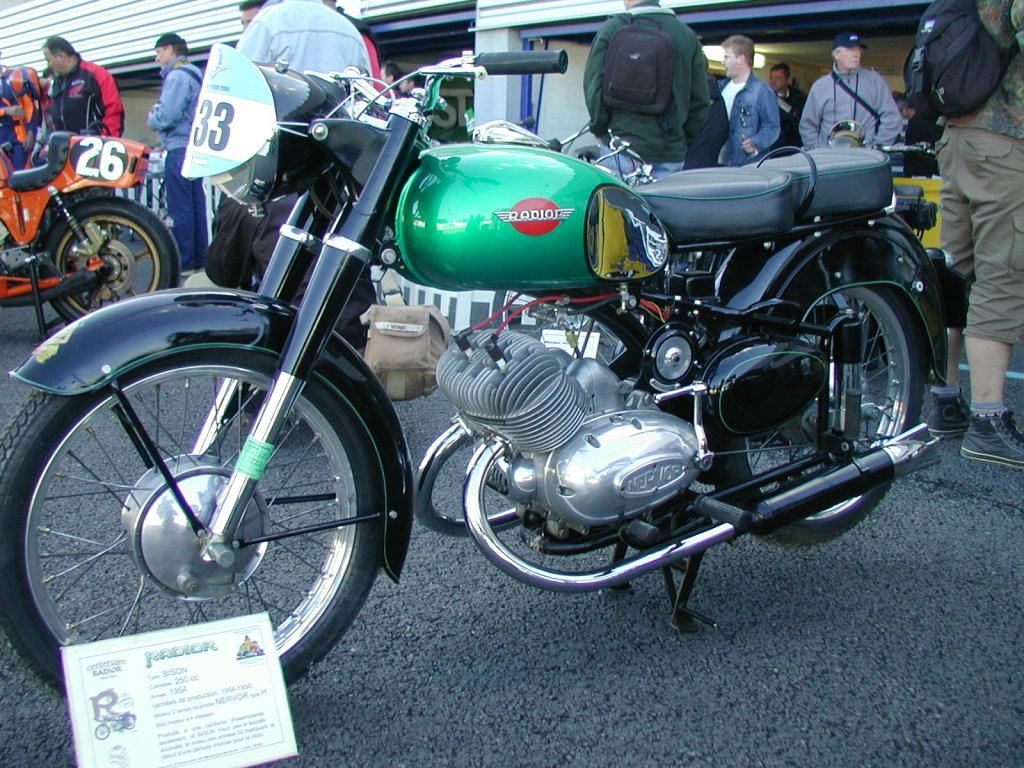
Radior

The Radior was a French automobile manufactured from 1920 until 1922. A few 1592 cc Ballot-engined cars were assembled by one M. Chapolard, a Rochet-Schneider agent in Bourg-en-Bresse, and sold under this name.
