= Tourey =

French automobile made in 1898 by Jules Tourey

The Tourey was a French automobile manufactured by Jules Tourey only in 1898. A 4 hp model called the "Petit Duc", it was similar to the Benz.
