= Naptholette =

1899 French automobile

The Naptholette was a French automobile manufactured only in 1899. A 2½ hp light car similar to the Decauville, its body could be "removed in an instant and another one substituted".
