= Butterosi =

- Founded: 1919
- Headquarters: Boulogne-sur-Seine, Paris
- Products: Automobiles

The Butterosi was a French automobile manufactured between 1919 and 1924 in Boulogne-sur-Seine, just 8.2 km (5 mi) west of central Paris,

The car featured a side-valve four-cylinder engine of 1327cc (12 HP) and sat on a 2,600 mm (102.4 in) wheelbase. Three different body styles were offered - a two-seater roadster, a tourer and a closed saloon.

The Butterosi was not held in universally high regard: in his book French Vintage Cars, John Bolster writes "Some people think all vintage cars are good, which only proves that they have never owned a Butterosi!".

In addition to assembling its own 12 HP model, Ponderosi was the French importer for American Mitchell cars from Wisconsin.
