= Elgé =

French automobile

The Elgé was a French automobile manufactured from 1924 until 1925. Created at Bordeaux by Roger Louis Maleyre, a pioneer in the field of aerodynamics, it was very low and light, and was well streamlined; the cars used CIM engines. Maleyre also produced a prototype design for a propeller-driven car which was never put into production. In total about thirty cars were produced.
