= Malliary =

1901 French automobile

The Maillary was a French automobile manufactured only in 1901. A 6 cv shaft-drive voiturette, it was built in Puteaux.
