= La Lorraine =

La Lorraine was a French automobile manufactured in Bar-le-Duc, Meuse by Charles Schmid from 1899 until 1902. A vis-à-vis, it featured infinitely variable belt-drive.
