= 4 Stroke Rumen =

The 4 Stroke Rumen designed by Roumen Antonov, is a prototype automobile developed in the 2000s. It was a Toyota Aygo rebodied to resemble the Bugatti Atlantic of 1938, so it retained all the mechanics of the Toyota including its 3-cylinder engine of 68 hp.

== Roumen Antonov ==
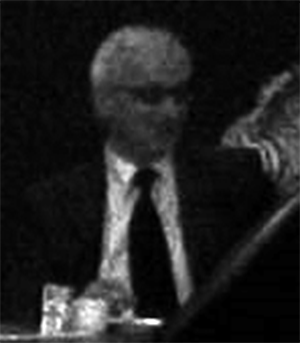
Roumen Antonov

Roumen Antonov was born in Sofia in 1944. He was an inventor who was involved in the field of medicine and automotive projects. He graduated with a degree in Nuclear Physics and studied engineering and design because of his interest in automobiles. His work included searching for a cure for atherosclerosis and developing innovations for transmissions. Antonov is noted for designing the direct shift gearbox.

== Development ==
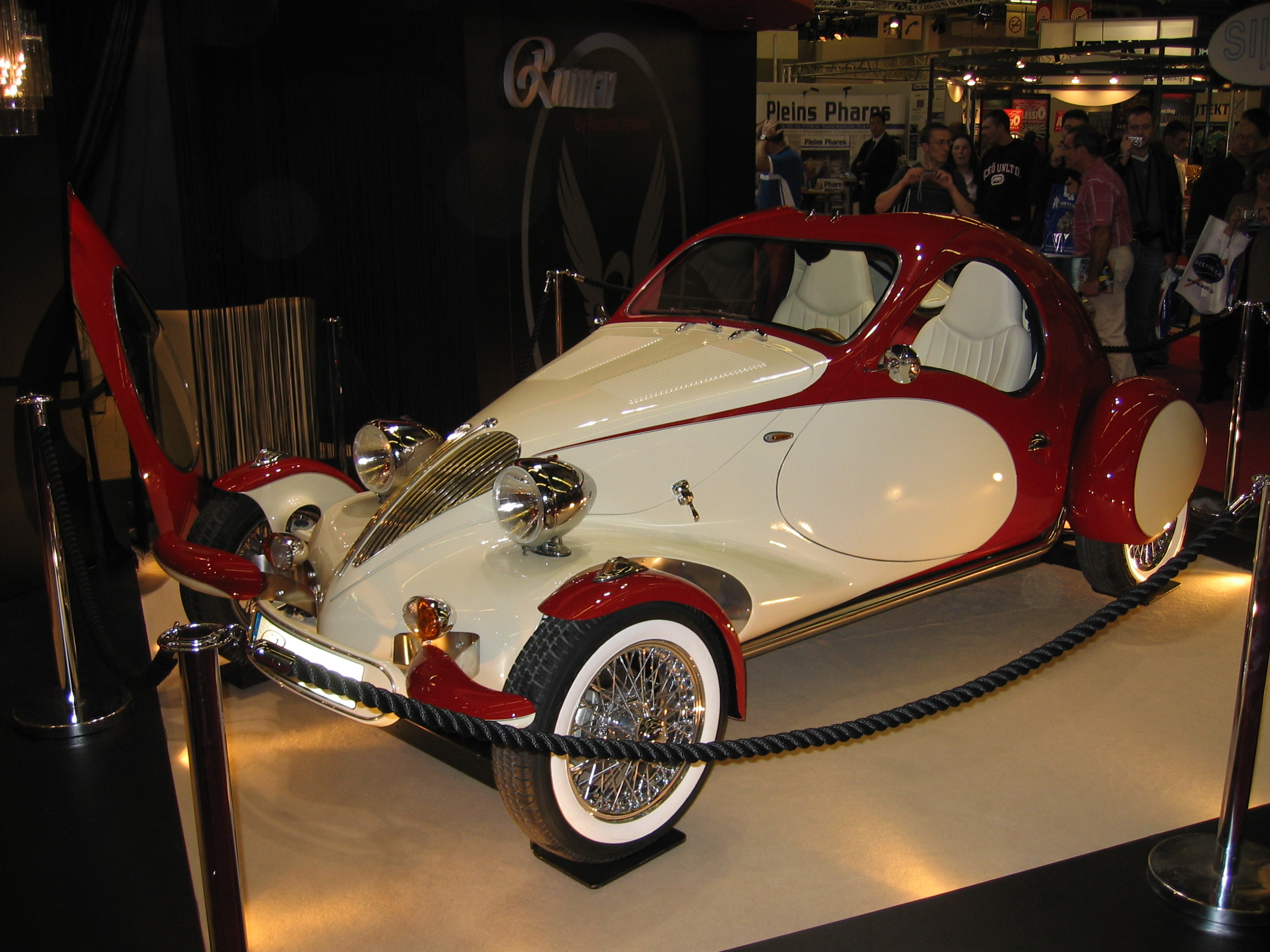

The Rumen was designed by Antonov with design concepts commencing in the early seventies including a small scale model, while he was still living in communist Bulgaria. In 1998 Antonov opened workshop in Le Mesnil-Amelot, France and built a proto-type. The proto-type was displayed at the 2002 Paris Motor Show and at the 2005 Frankfurt Motor Show. The Rumen was targeted, according to Antonov, at wealthy women in the US and UK market. Antonov also choose to make the car in France because it is the bearer of an image abroad synonymous with luxury, high-end, refinement to quote him directly.

== Specifications ==
It has a leather interior, with power windows, electrically adjustable seats, and an optional wood dashboard. Seven different two tone paint options were to be available. The price in 2007 was €55,000 (US$70,000).

The cars body is carbon fibre composite on steel frame. The car powered by a three-cylinder 998cc engine with a five speed sequential semi-automatic gearbox. It has independent suspension with ABS and stability control.
