= Pierre Faure (automobile) =

Former French automobile manufacturer

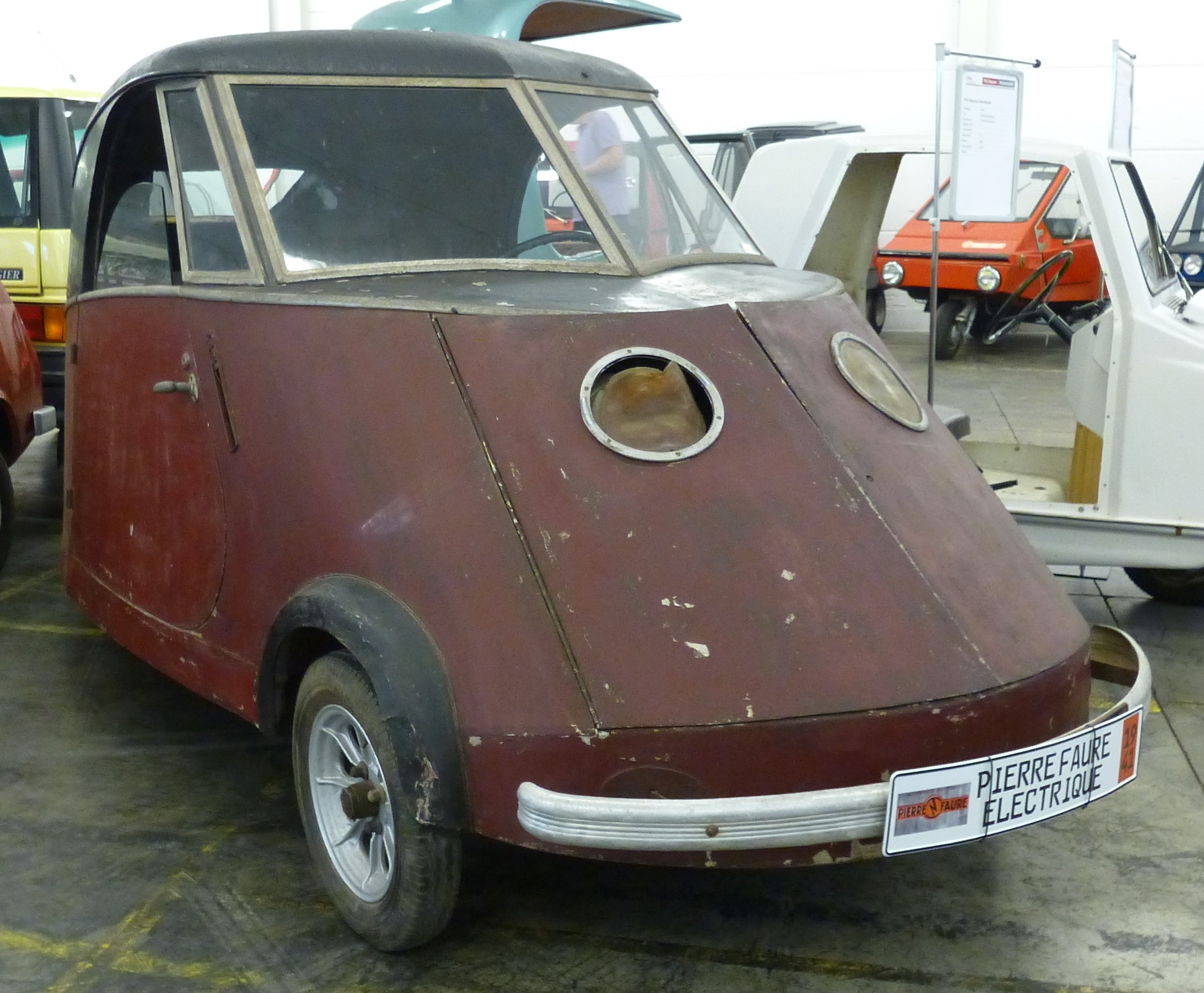
- A Pierre Faure from 1941
- Industry: Automotive
- Founded: 1941; 84 years ago
- Defunct: 1947
- Fate: Liquidation
- Headquarters: Paris, France

Pierre Faure was a French manufacturer of automobiles.

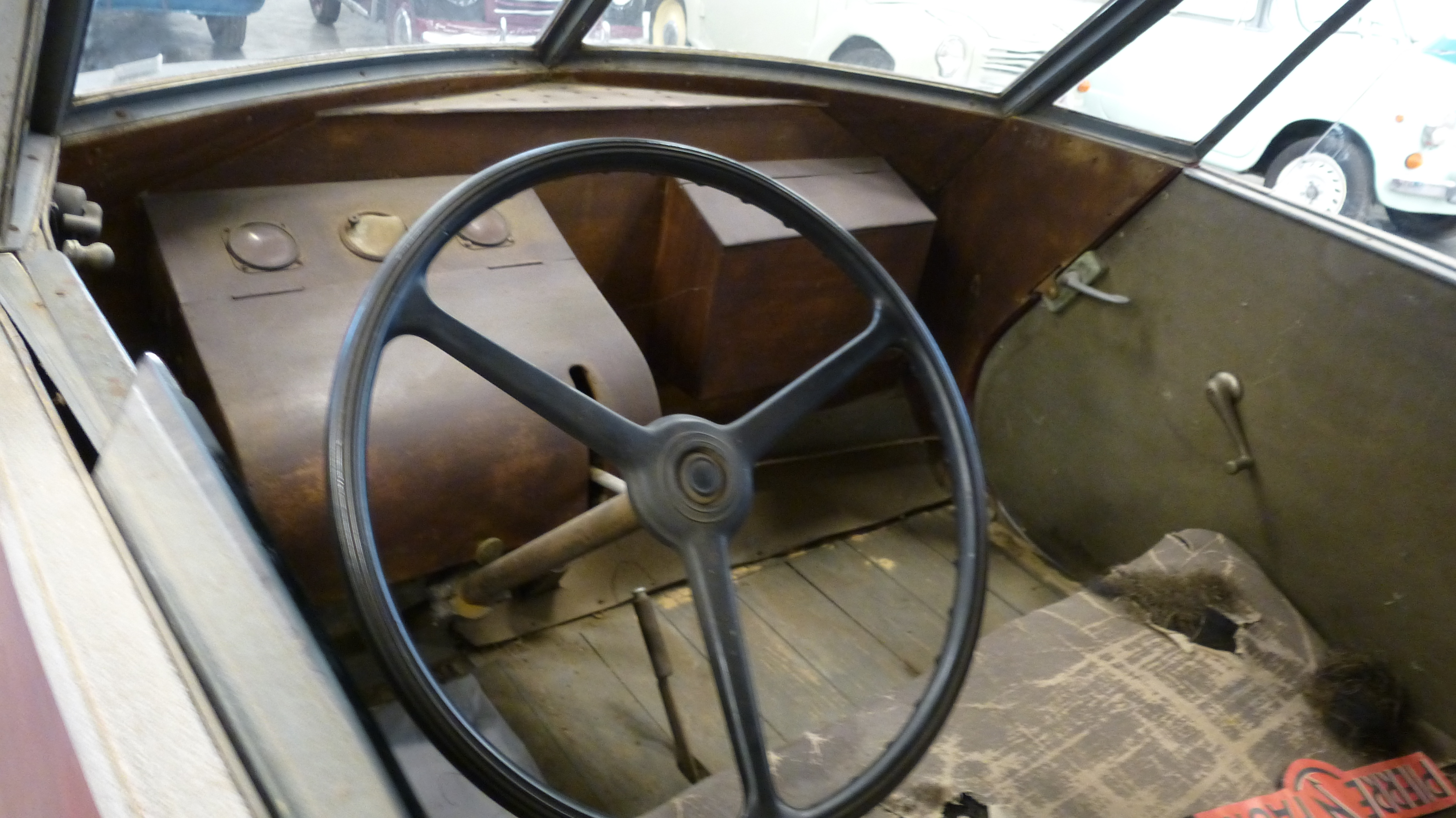
Pierre Faure 1941 interior

== History ==
The company started producing automobiles in 1941. The brand name was Faure, or Pierre Faure. In 1946 the company presented vehicles at the Paris Motor Show. Production ended in 1947.

== Vehicles ==
The company only produced electric cars as during the Second World War, there was a shortage of gasoline. A coupe and delivery van were offered. The top speed was 40 to 45 km/h and the range was 69 to 80 km. In 2016, a 1941 Pierre Faure in need of restoration was auctioned for 21,900 Euros.
