= Danvignes =

The Danvignes was a French automobile manufactured in Paris from 1937 until 1939. A small sports car, it was built by a motorcycle agent. Two-seater and roadster bodies were constructed, and the power units were a 750 cc twin or an 1100 cc Ruby, the latter version having been developed thanks to the financial support of industrial Vincent Comar.
