= Charlon =

French automobile manufactured in 1905–06

The Charlon was a French automobile manufactured in 1905 and 1906 in Argenteuil, Val-d'Oise. The smallest was a belt-driven voiturette, with a 9 hp engine possibly built under licence from the short-lived Mahout company. Three larger models were also advertised with 12 to 40 hp four-cylinder engines with chain drive.
