= Jouffret =

The Jouffret was a French automobile manufactured between 1920 and 1926. Built by Léon Demeester, first in Suresnes and then in Colombes they were sometimes marketed under his own name. They used 1172 cc and 1616 cc ohv engines from S.C.A.P., Ruby and Ballot. In 1923, the company took over Sidéa, and began production of Sidéa-Jouffret cars.
