= Jousset =

Jousset was a French automobile manufacturer from 1924 until 1928. Built by a M. Louis Jousset of Bellac in Haute Vienne, they were Ruby or CIME engined sports and touring cars of 1099 cc and 1496 cc.

Jousset were also coachbuilders making bodies for Ariès who competed with one at the Le Mans 24 hour race (entry number 29 in 1927) with the Fournier team from Paris. The coach finished 14th despite the small setbacks of a small engine fire and hitting a hare.
