= Luxior =

French automobile

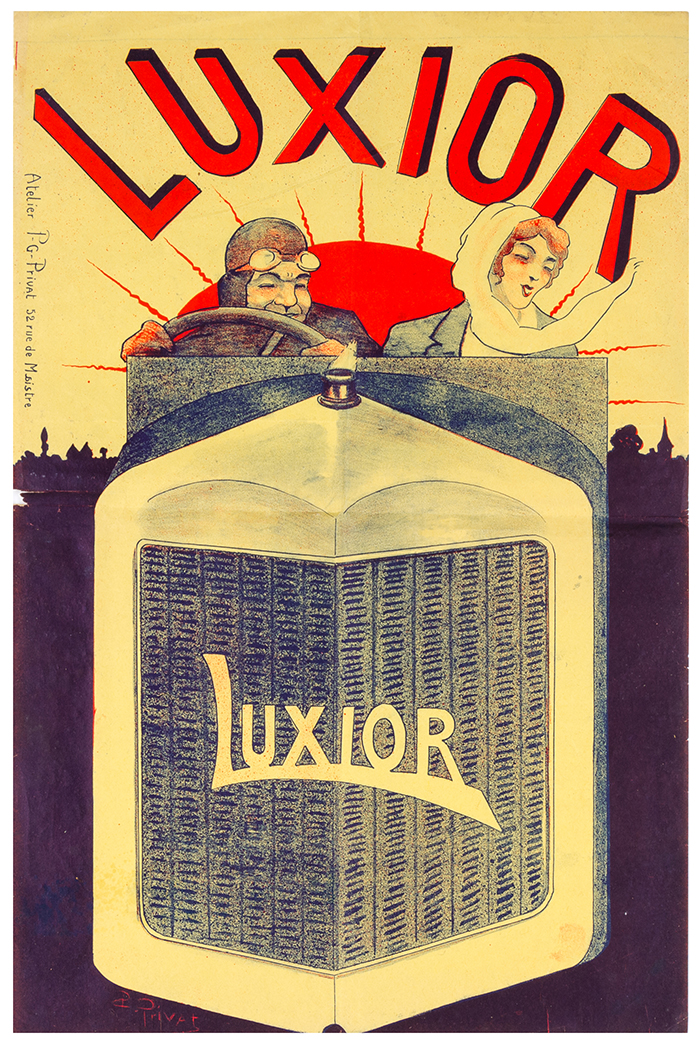
Advertising poster by Henri Privat-Livemont (1912)

The Luxior was a French automobile manufactured from 1912 until 1914. A four-cylinder from Vincennes, it had a 1779 cc engine and was one of the first light cars to be offered as a saloon. In 1912 the company also produced a 1767 cc model advertised as having a "valveless pre-compression engine with superimposed cylinders".
