= Hédéa =

The Hédéa was a French automobile manufactured in Paris from 1912 until 1924. Built by an M. Accary, and sometimes sold under his own name, they were medium-sized cars with 1795 cc Chapuis-Dornier engines.
