= Ryjan =

French automobile manufacturer

Ryjan (Car name) Grillet (Company name)
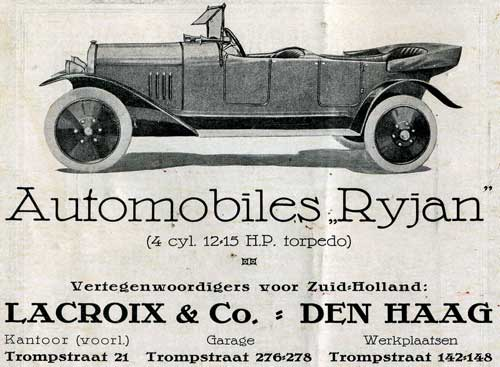
- Industry: Automotive
- Founded: 1920
- Defunct: 1926
- Headquarters: Chatou, France (1920-1925); Nanterre, France (1925-1926)

Ryjan was a make of French automobile produced by the Grillet company between 1920 and 1926. The factory was established in what was then a small town, a short distance to the west of Paris, called Chatou. In 1925 production was relocated to Nanterre in the west of the country.

== The business ==
The first Ryjan car was being promoted at the Paris Motor Show in October 1919, and almost immediately, in 1920, the newly formed business started to produce their first model.

== The car ==
The 1920 “Ryjan HJ4” sat on a 3,000 mm (118.1 in) wheelbase and was priced by the manufacturer at 21,000 francs for a four-seater ”Torpedo” bodied car and 25,000 francs for a four-seater “conduite interieure” (closed sedan/saloon/berline) bodied car. The engine was a 4-cylinder 2,292cc unit. Other sources indicate that early cars used a 1690cc engine bought in from S.C.A.P. (Société de Constructeur Automobiles Paris), a specialist engine manufacturer located nearby.

Five years later the manufacturer took at stand at the Auto Salon in October 1924. This car still had a S.C.A.P. engine, now of 1,614cc: customers were able to choose between a sidevalve and an overhead valve version of this engine. The 1924/25 car sat on the same 3,000 mm (118.1 in) wheelbase as before. The manufacturer's listed price for a four-seater ”Torpedo” bodied car had increased to 27,000 francs, however, reflecting general inflation in the French economy.

For the last two years the cars were also advertised with a 2-litre engine from "Altos", another engine supplier. Production ended in 1926.
