= Poinard =

Poinard is a former French auto-maker. The vehicles commenced development in 1951, were presented to the public in 1952, and withdrawn from production in 1953.

== The car ==
The only model produced was a three-wheeler urban cycle car which closely resembled the side-car half of a motor-cycle/side car combination. This reflected Poinard's main business as a side-car manufacturer. The driver sat alone on a saddle controlling the front wheel using a motorcycle style handle-bars. Close behind the driver was a bench seat suitable for two narrow passengers, although doubts have been expressed as to whether the vehicle's engine power would have been sufficient to move so many people.

== The engine ==
The Poinard was one of several cycle cars of the period to be powered by an Ydral single cylinder 125 cc two stroke engine positioned to the rear and delivering a claimed 4 hp of power.

== Sources and further reading ==
- Walter Zeichner: Kleinwagen International. Motorbuch-Verlag. Stuttgart 1999. ISBN 3-613-01959-0
