= Zeiller & Fournier =

Automobiles Zeiller & Fournier
- Industry: Manufacturing
- Founded: 1920
- Defunct: 1924
- Headquarters: Levallois-Perret, France
- Key people: Charles Fournier
- Products: Automobiles

Zeiller & Fournier was a short-lived French automobile producer.

Car production began in 1920 at premises in Levallois-Perret, and ended in 1924. The cars were designed by racing driver Charles Fournier. There is no connection established between Charles Fournier and the Fournier brothers who established an automobile manufacturing business under the name Établissements Fournier in the same part of north-central Paris.

Less than a year after the outbreak of peace, Zeiller et Fournier took a stand at the 15th Paris Motor Show and exhibited 1 6/8HP car which sat on a 2,330 mm (91.7 in) wheelbase and was powered by a Ballot 4-cylinder engine of 1131cc. The car featured an interesting 5-speed friction transmission and a chain final drive. There was also a smaller car produced with a 904cc 4-cylinder engine from Ruby.

== Reading list ==
- Harald Linz, Halwart Schrader: Die Internationale Automobil-Enzyklopädie. United Soft Media Verlag, München 2008, ISBN 978-3-8032-9876-8. (German)
- George Nick Georgano (Chefredakteur): The Beaulieu Encyclopedia of the Automobile. Volume 3: P–Z. Fitzroy Dearborn Publishers, Chicago 2001, ISBN 1-57958-293-1. (English)
- George Nick Georgano: Autos. Encyclopédie complète. 1885 à nos jours. Courtille, Paris 1975. (French)
