= Ailloud =

The Ailloud was a French automobile, built between 1898 and 1904 by Claude Ailloud of Lyon. The first car had a 618 cc twin-cylinder air-cooled engine, rear-mounted, driving through a 3-speed gearbox and chain drive. To improve cooling the engine was soon moved to the front of the car. Probably only one was made.

He joined Francisque Dumond in 1900 to form Automobiles Ailloud et Dumond, and they made a small number of cars some with De Dion engines.

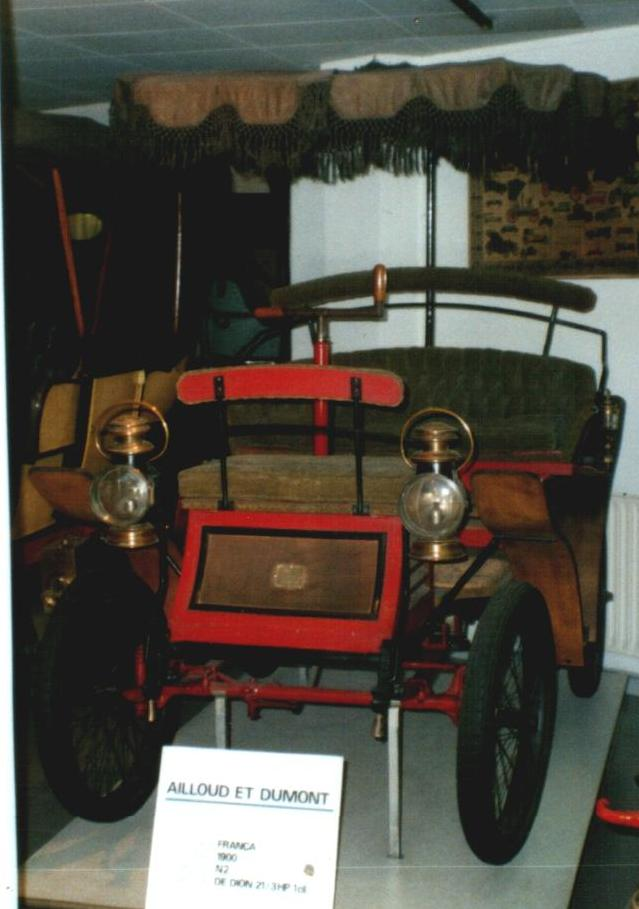
Ailloud & Dumont from 1900
