= André Py =

French Automobile Designer

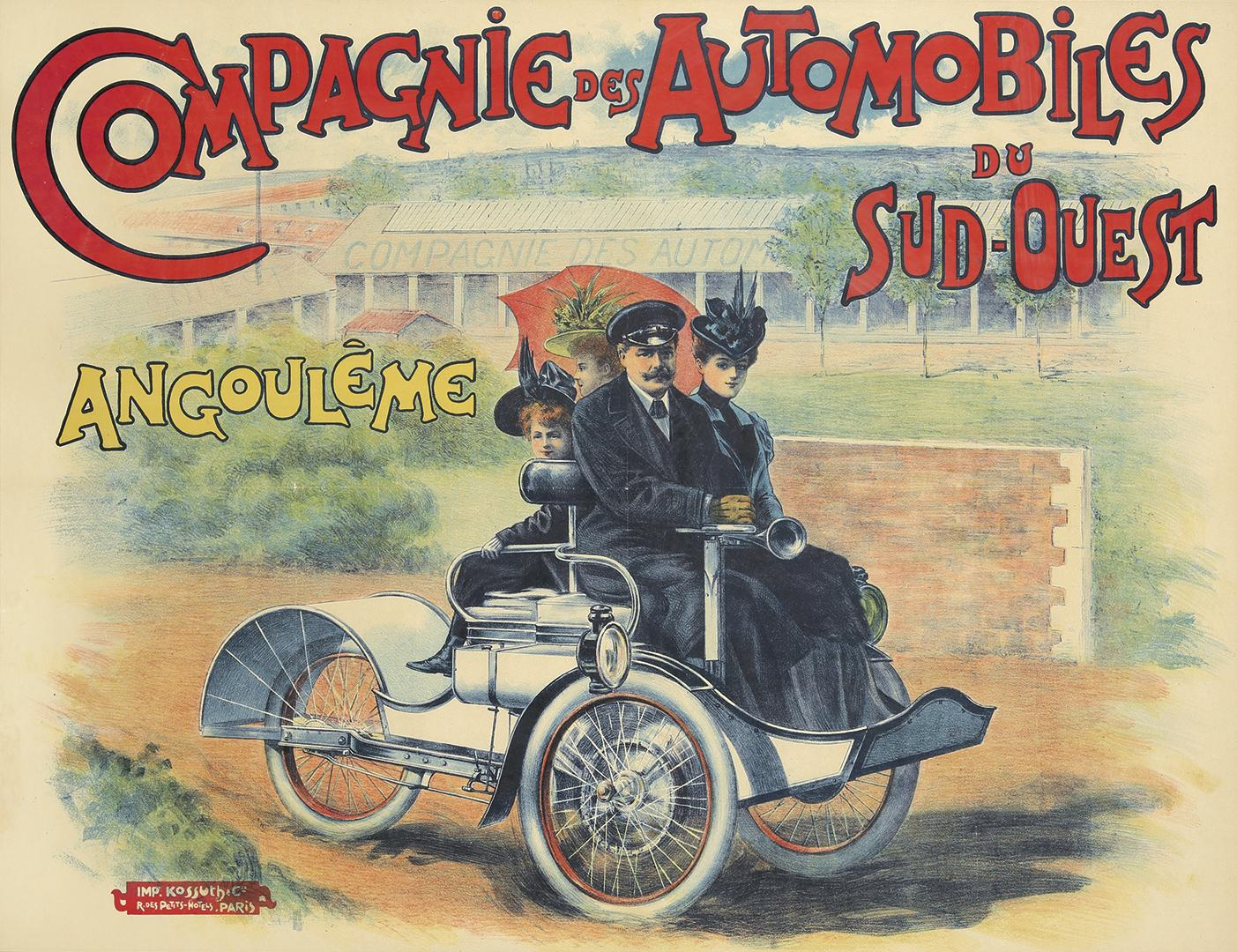
André Py 3.5 CV Voiturette

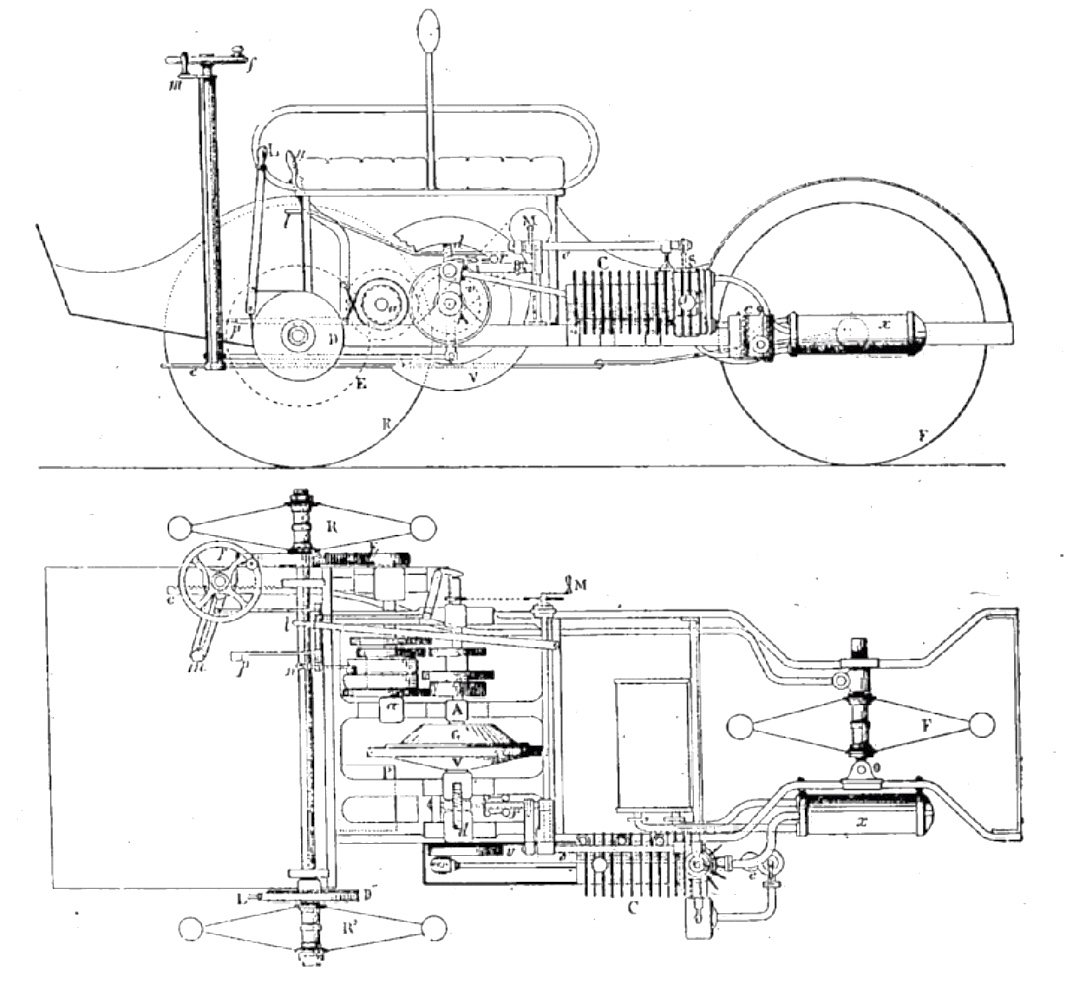
André Py 3.5 CV Voiturette side view and top view (1899)

André Py (fl. 1898–1900) was a French automobile designer and early manufacturer. He is known for designing a three-wheeled motorized voiturette in 1899, which was produced by the Compagnie des Automobiles du Sud-Ouest in Angoulême, France. Py's lightweight car featured an unusual configuration with front-wheel drive and a rear-wheel steering system, an innovative but short-lived design.

== Early life ==
By the late 1890s, Py was active in the Charente region of southwestern France. He live in the city of Angoulême.

== Cycling career ==
In the 1890s, France's vibrant cycling culture and industry provided the foundation for early automobile experimentation. By 1898, he had designed a small motor vehicle inspired by motorized tricycles and bicycle technology. That year, he prepared a prototype of a three-wheeled "voiturette" (a light horseless carriage) for public display. In December 1898, at the inaugural Paris Motor Show held at the Jardin des Tuileries, Py exhibited his front-wheel-drive motor tricycle to advertise his design. The vehicle attracted interest due to its unconventional layout, which was reminiscent of Léon Bollée’s famous three-wheeler but with key differences.

Following this debut, Py partnered with local investors to manufacture the car. He helped found the Compagnie des Automobiles du Sud-Ouest, based in Angoulême, in early 1899 to produce his vehicle commercially. Py assumed the role of designer and technical director. Production of the car - marketed simply as the "André Py" voiturette - began in 1899.

== Milestones ==
- 1898 – Exhibited a prototype front-wheel-drive motor tricycle at the Paris Automobile Salon, one of the earliest front-wheel-drive cars shown to the public.
- 1899 – Established the Compagnie des Automobiles du Sud-Ouest in Angoulême and launched the André Py 3½ CV Voiturette for sale. The vehicle featured a single-cylinder 3.5 horsepower engine, three-speed transmission, and back-to-back seating for two passengers. It could reach approximately 30 km/h (19 mph) in top gear and was priced at 3,000 francs in 1899.
- 1900 – Production ceased after roughly two years. The company built only a small number of cars before closing in 1900.

== See also ==
- Voiturette
- Léon Bollée
- Motorized tricycle
