= Chainless =

French automobile manufactured 1900–1903

The Chainless was a French automobile manufactured from 1900 to 1903 in Paris by SA des Voitures Légère Chainless. The cars used Abeille or Buchet engines of 10, 16, and 20 cv, were shaft-driven voiturettes.
