= Borderel-Cail =

The Borderel-Cail was a French automobile manufactured in Denain in the 1910s by Société J. F. Cail & Cie., who was a builder of railway locomotives since the 1840s.

In 1905 they built a six-wheeled limousine, powered by a 4-cylinder engine. Power was supplied to the center axle, while both the front and rear wheels steered. An updated version of the car with a more powerful engine was shown at the 1906 Paris Salon. The final Borderel-Cail was a conventional four-wheeled car with a 30 horsepower 4-cylinder engine, launched in 1907.
