= Raouval =

Raouval

The Raouval was a French automobile manufactured in Anzin from 1899 until 1902. Its power unit, which was similar in design to Léon Lefebvre's Pygmée engine, was an 8 hp twin with a displacement of 2,851 cc.
