= Henou =

The Henou was a French automobile manufactured only in 1923. Marketed by M. Henou from Paris, they were 1843 cc cars built by Guilick of Maubeuge.
