= Lahaussois =

The Lahaussois was a French automobile manufactured only in 1907. The company, headquartered in Paris, offered both chassis and complete vehicles.
