= Margaria =

The Margaria was a French automobile manufactured between 1910 and 1912. A 2297 cc four-cylinder which was shown at the 1910 Paris Salon, the shaft-drive car sold in chassis form for 5000 francs. M. Margaria teamed up with M. Launay to build the SCAP beginning in 1912.
