= La Radieuse =

The La Radieuse was a French automobile manufactured only in 1907. A voiturette built at Bayeux by one M. E. Marie, it was shown at the 1907 Paris Salon.
