= Eudelin =

Automobile manufacturer

The Eudelin was a French automobile manufactured from around 1905 until 1908. The product of a Parisian builder, it came in 14/16 hp and 25/40 hp four-cylinder models. The company also produced an opposed-piston engine with a complex variable-stroke linkage. The original power unit was described as a "double piston engine with a single double throw crank directly below the combustion chamber".

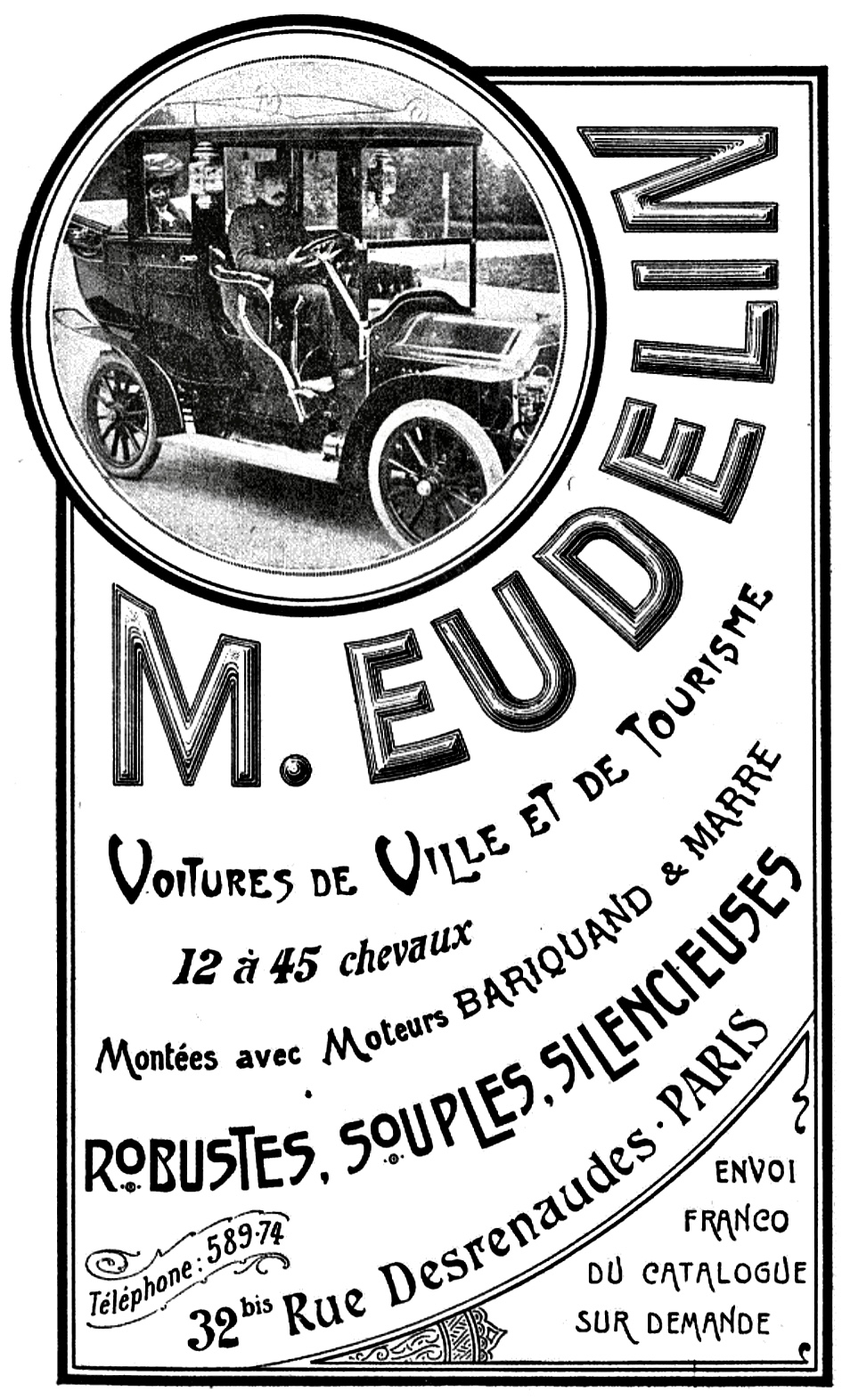
Eudelin
