= De Bazelaire =

Automobile manufacturer

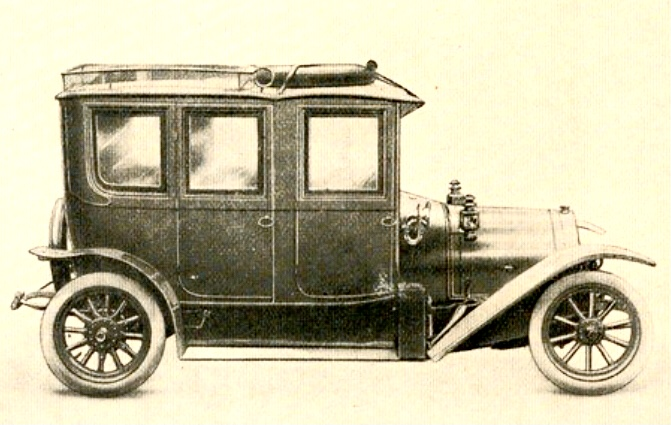

De Bazelaire was a French car maker founded in 1907 by Fernand de Bazelaire.

== History ==
The plant established at Rue Gager-Gabillot in Paris (15e), produced more than thirty models from 1907 to 1928. The cars were intended for racing, but were built with a luxury look. The showroom was located at Avenue des Ternes, in Paris (17e).

The car first appeared on a race track in July 1908 in the Coupe de l'Auto race, the engine had a capacity of 1460 cc and delivered 22 brake horsepower (16 kW) at 1800 rpm. The top speed of the car was 59 mph, models with a six-cylinder engine were built during the 1910s. After World War I, De Bazelaire manufactured cars with a 2.1 litre S.C.A.P. engine.

Fernand de Bazelaire took part in several races, driving his own cars, notably at the Coupe des Voiturettes at Boulogne-sur-mer (1910) and at the Tour de France Automobile (1912).

The car manufacturer ceased its activities in 1928, when Fernand de Bazelaire joined the French car maker Delahaye.

- De Bazelaire model(s)
  - De Bazelaire 10CV (1910)
