= David & Bourgeois =

French automobile

The David & Bourgeois was a French automobile manufactured only in 1898. A tiller-steered saloon, it featured a "square-four" engine developed by Paul Gautier.
