= Sixcyl =

French automobile

The Sixcyl was a French automobile manufactured from 1907 until 1908. A product of the Bréguet aviation factory in Paris, the car was built under the supervision of Paul Cheneu. Cheneu additionally offered cars under his own name from 1903. Two models, a 30/50 hp of 6126 cc and a 50/80 hp of 8822 cc, were available.
