= Octo (automobile) =

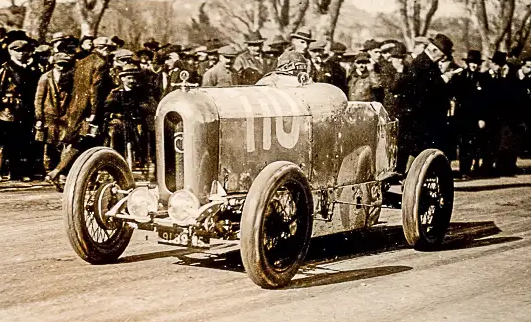
- An Octo car in the 1920s.
- Industry: Manufacturing
- Founded: 1921
- Defunct: 1928
- Headquarters: Courbevoie, France
- Key people: Louis Vienne
- Products: Automobiles

Octo was a French automobile manufactured at Courbevoie by Louis Vienne between 1921 and 1928.

== The business ==
Louis Vienne founded the company in the Avenue Marceau at Courbevoie in order to produce Octo branded cars. Production ended in 1928

(In the same year Vienne also established a second automobile brand at Courbevoie, but this car, the Carteret, did not last beyond 1922.)

== The cars ==
At the 15th Paris Motor Show, in October 1919, Octo were already displaying their "Octo Type A" which competed in the 10HP taxation class and sat on a 2,700 mm (106.3 in) wheelbase. It was powered by a 4-cylinder engine of 1,590 cc. The engine for these first Octo cars came from Ballot. At this time the manufacturer was quoting a price of 13,600 francs for a "Torpedo" bodied car.

By October 1924 the engine had been replaced by a 972 cc Ruby engine which placed the car in the 7HP class, and the wheelbase was reduced to 2,500 mm (98.4 in). This car was priced at 12,800 francs, which as before included a "Torpedo" body. Many Octos were delivered with 2-seater light bodies. Cars fitted with "Delivery vehicle" and "Roadster" bodies also appeared.

There was no Paris Motor Show in 1925, the venue being used instead for an Exhibition of Decorative Arts. At the 20th Paris Motor Show, in October 1926 Octo exhibited two models. The 7HP 4-cylinder 972 cc Ruby engine was again offered, now on a car with a chassis of 2,250 mm (88.6 in). There was also a 9HP powered by a 1097 cc Ruby engine and using a 2,600 mm (102.4 in) wheelbase. Another development for 1926 was the addition of front-wheel brakes. The manufacturer's advertised prices, which as before included simple "Torpedo" bodies with 2 places in the shorter car and 4 places in the longer one, were respectively 18,800 francs and 30,000 francs.

== Reading list ==
- Harald Linz, Halwart Schrader: Die Internationale Automobil-Enzyklopädie. United Soft Media Verlag, München 2008, ISBN 978-3-8032-9876-8. (German)
- George Nick Georgano (Chefredakteur): The Beaulieu Encyclopedia of the Automobile. Volume 3: P–Z. Fitzroy Dearborn Publishers, Chicago 2001, ISBN 1-57958-293-1. (English)
- George Nick Georgano: Autos. Encyclopédie complète. 1885 à nos jours. Courtille, Paris 1975. (French)
