= Hinstin =

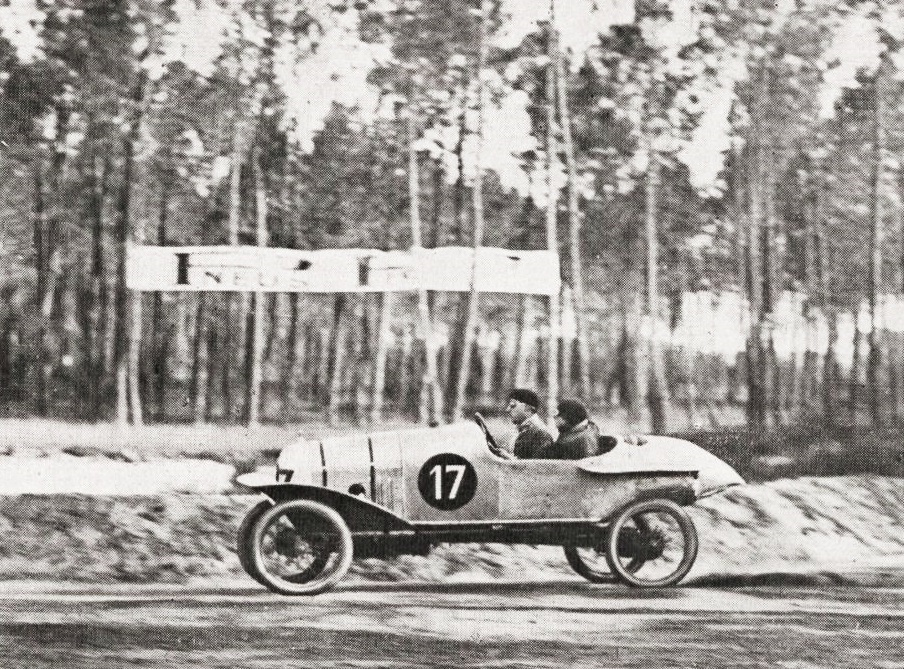
Gérard de Courcelles with a Hinstin in the 1921 Grand Prix de l'U.M.F.

The Hinstin was a French automobile manufactured from 1921 until 1926. Built both by a M. Hinstin in the Paquis works at Mézières and by Guilick in Maubeuge, they were light cyclecars with 1099 cc CIME and 1094 cc Ruby engines. Some light cars powered by 1500 cc S.C.A.P. engines were also offered.
