= Urric =

French automobile

The Urric was a French automobile manufactured between 1905 and 1906. Called a "well-conceived" voiturette, it was shown at the Paris Salon of 1905.
