= Roger (automobile) =

Light car

The Roger was a light car manufactured by Thomas Rodger & Co Ltd of Wolverhampton, England, between 1920 and 1924.

The Eleven model was powered by a 1,370cc 4-cylinder Coventry Climax engine, and featured friction transmission and chain final drive. The only body style offered originally was a 2-seater, which featured leather upholstery, royal blue paintwork and disc wheels. A coupe was offered in 1924, and a self-starter was a £13 optional extra. The agent for the Roger was the Ogle Motor Co of London. Production was approximately 100 cars, as the Roger could not compete on price against manufacturers such as Clyno.
