= Solanet =

The Solanet was a French rear-engined V-8 automobile made by Count Solanet in 1921. Only one was actually built.
