= Le Pratic =

The Le Pratic was a French automobile manufactured only in 1908. A product of Paris, it came in two monobloc-engined models, an 8/10 hp twin-cylinder and a 16/20 hp four-cylinder.
