= Automobiles Bernardet =

French motor manufacturer

Bernardet is the name of a manufacturing company created by three brothers named René, Robert and Roger Bernardet.

The company logo was a play on the brothers’ names, being a “3R” intertwined with a “B” and an “F” as in “Bernardet Frères” (Bernardet Brothers). The company was a manufacturer of sidecars and later of motor scooters, but between 1946 and 1950 Bernardet attempted to become an automobile manufacturer; this ambition was thwarted by government restrictions which prevented them from being able to acquire the necessary materials and components.

== The enterprise ==
The enterprise prepared prototype cars at their plant in Châtillon-sous-Bagneux, south suburb of Paris, in 1946. In 1950 the last was presented at the Geneva Motor Exhibition.

== The cars ==
For the 1946 Paris Motor Show the company exhibited a small front wheel drive car with a transversely mounted flat-four cylinder two stroke engine of 798 cc. The cars shown in the 1947 Automobila magazine and in the 1948 Automobila magazine were very appreciated by the public and orders were made during the show. However, the Bernardet brothers had failed to obtain the consent of the authorities to their plans, and were unable to purchase the materials necessary to put the cars into production.

At the 1947 Paris Motor Show a similar coupé bodied "hard-top“ was shown, but none of these cars were produced and sold. For the 1949 model the engine size was reduced to 748 cc.
