= Lufbery automobile =

French automobile manufacturer

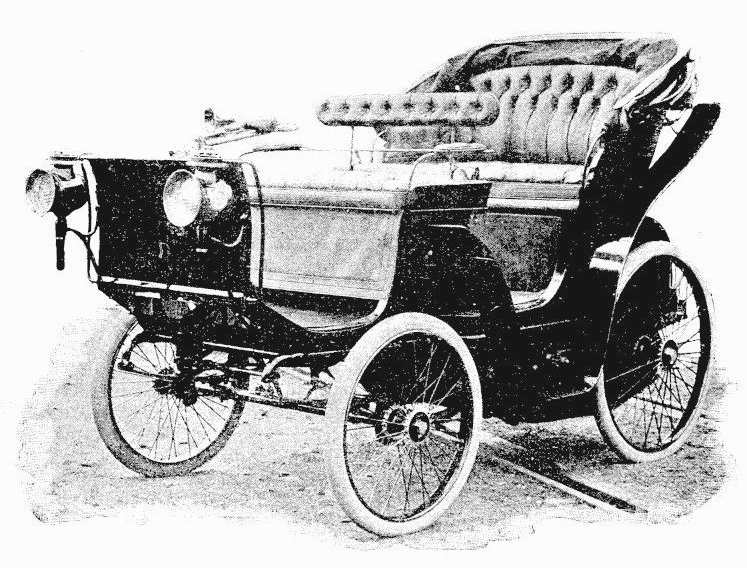
Lufbery 4 CV, reversing gearbox, 1898.

The Lufbery was a French automobile manufactured from 1898 until around 1902. Built by Charles-Edouard Lufbery, it was a rear-engined vee-twin which combined epicyclic gearing and three-speed belt transmission to create a primitive form of overdrive.
