= Millot =

French automobile

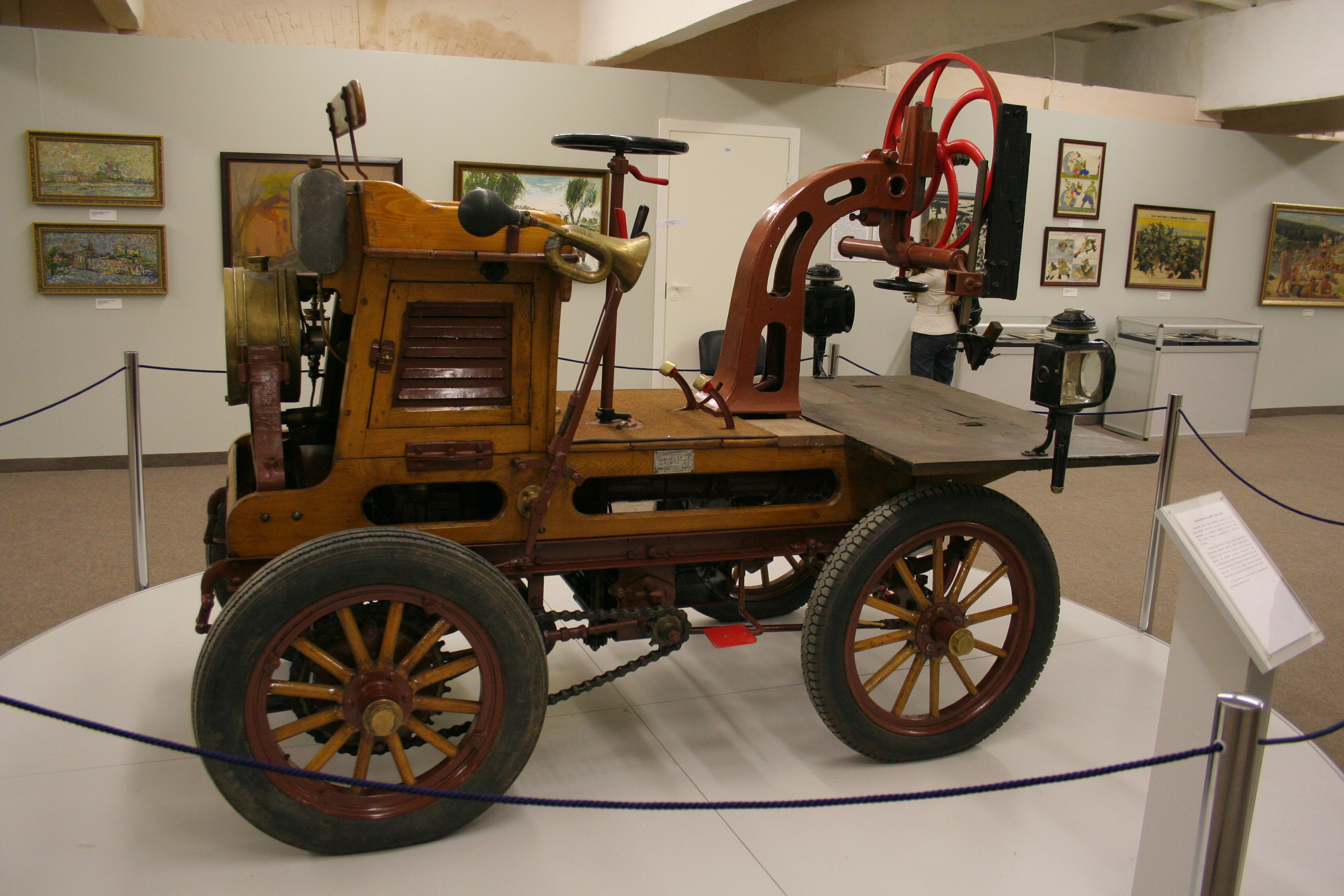
Millot vehicle in Museum of Moscow, with rear facing front seats, chain and flat steering wheel

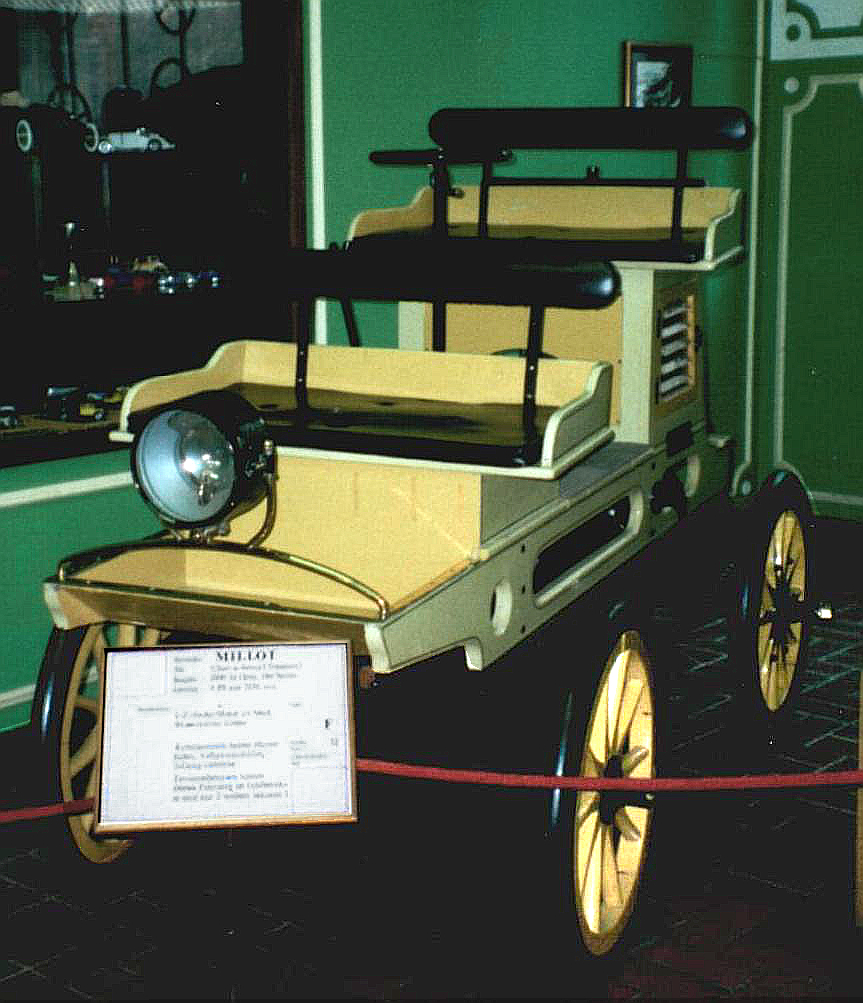
1900 Millot with a 2+2 body

Millot was a French automobile built by the Millot brothers in the town of Gray, in 1896.

The car was steered with a flat steering wheel in the center of the car. The seating was a seat at the back facing forward and a seat on the front where the passengers would have been facing in the opposite direction. The engine was under the rear seat and turned the wheels with a huge chain. Another strange feature was the enormous flywheel.

In 1901, the 'Vis-à-vis' body was replaced by a modern 2+2 body. They also built cars with four-cylinder engines.

The automobile was not very successful and the number of cars produced is unknown. It is believed that only a very limited number were ever made. The company was closed in 1902.

== See also ==
- List of car brands
