= Decauville =

French automobile and light railway manufacturer

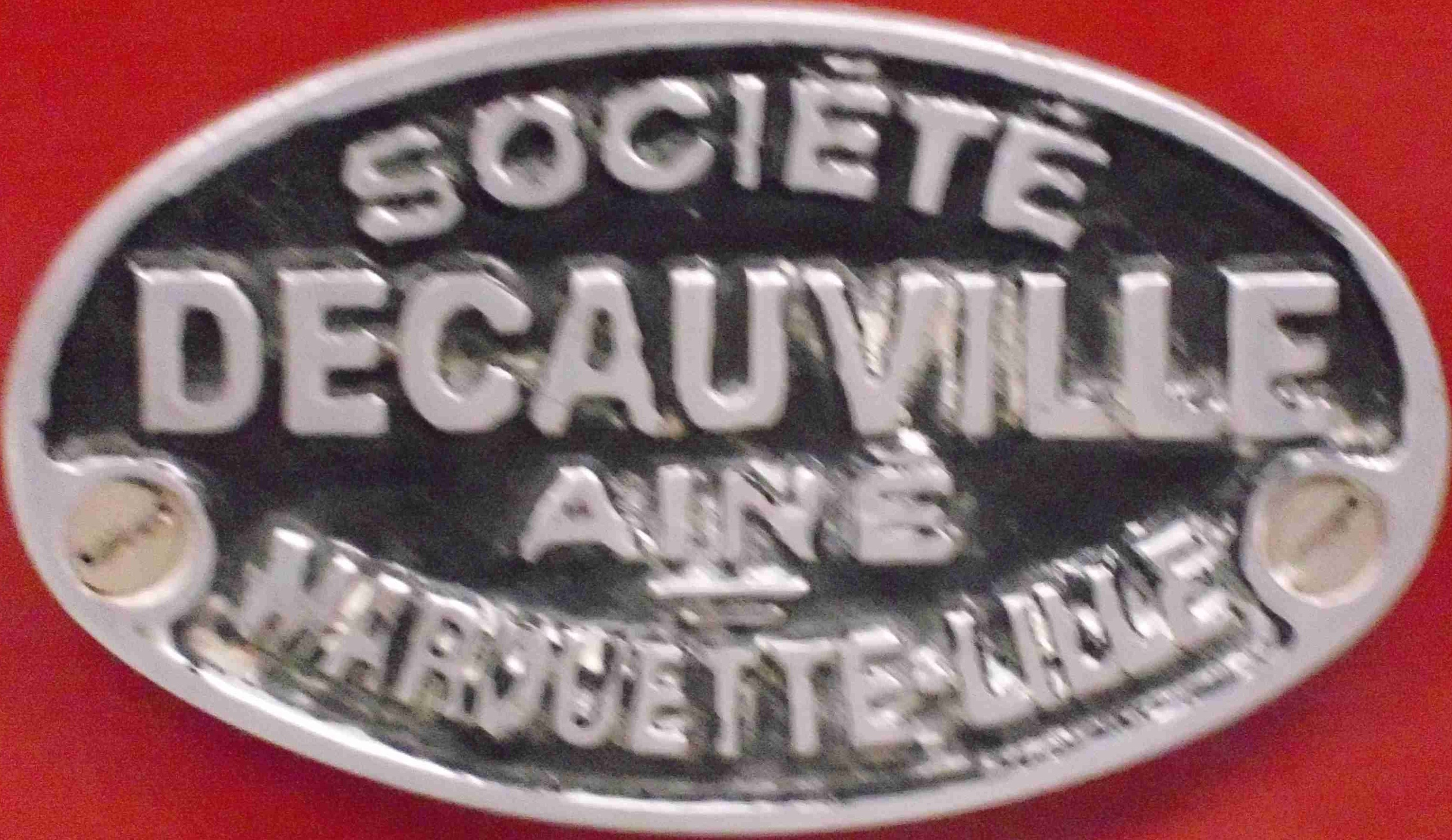
- Type: Private
- Industry: Transport
- Founded: 1 January 1957
- Founder: Paul Decauville
- Headquarters: Corbeil-Essonnes, France
- Area served: Worldwide
- Products: Rail tracks, sleepers, steam locomotives, coaches
- Owner: Fassi

Decauville (French: [dəkovil]) was a manufacturing company which was founded by Paul Decauville (1846–1922), a French pioneer in industrial railways. Decauville's major innovation was the use of ready-made sections of light, narrow-gauge track fastened to steel sleepers; this track was portable and could be disassembled and transported very easily.

The first Decauville railway used 400 mm (15 3/4 in) gauge; Decauville later refined his invention and switched to 500 mm (19 3/4 in) and 600 mm (1 ft 11 5/8 in) gauge. Today Decauville is a sales company for the products of its parent company, it belongs to CTELM, a holding belonging to Fassi-cranes for the french market.

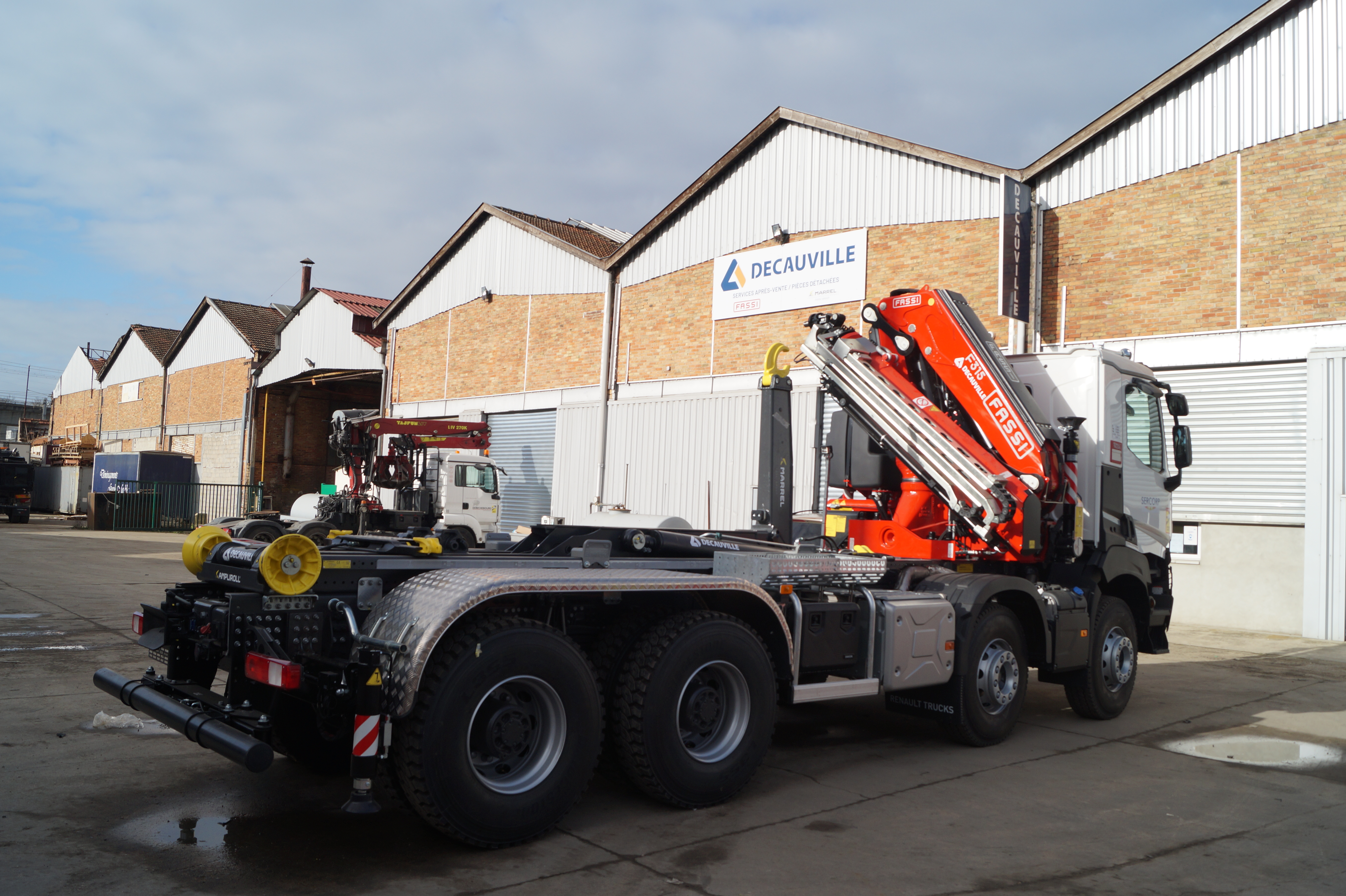
Marrel-tipper with Fassi-crane

== History ==
=== Origins ===
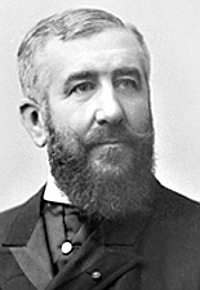
Paul Decauville, founder

In 1853 Paul Decauville's father, Amand, created a boilermaking workshop on the family farm in order to set up distilleries on the farms to the east of Paris. In 1864, Amand asked his eldest son, Paul, to come and help him following health problems. Very quickly, the latter seeks to improve the functioning of the estate. Very developed under the Second Empire in the northern half of France, the production of sugar beet and its refining into sugar, is linked to that of alcoholic products such as fuel. Amand will therefore endeavor to make this production profitable.

In 1867, in order to overcome a labor shortage, Amand Decauville looked for a way to mechanize the plowing of his fields. He selected an English system by engineer John Fowler that allowed plowing using a locomobile and a reversible plow. A workshop for repairing these machines completes the boilermaking one. Amand Decauville died in 1871 and the same year, the Decauville workshops began to carry out boilermaking work for the company Chemins de fer de Paris à Lyon et à la Méditerranée (PLM).

In 1875, things rushed: at the beginning of the year, Paul Decauville tried several means of transport within the very confines of his farm. Among these is the “H. Corbin System”: a wooden track, resembling a ladder, the uprights of which were covered with an iron angle iron. The wagons had only one axle, each resting on the previous one. After tests, this system was considered too fragile and was rejected. That same year, the Decauville farm chose to grow a lot of sugar beets and the harvest was expected to be excellent. A stock of 9000 tonnes of beets were waiting in soggy fields that are very difficult to access. Ordinary means of transportation (the dumper) prove unusable. Decauville then remembered the Corbin system and decided to have a track made in its workshops consisting of two square irons spaced 400 mm and fixed on flat iron crosspieces. To ensure transport, a worker had the idea of creating wagons. Thus constituted, the assembly no longer sunk into the ground. Faced with the urgency of the harvest, it was produced in quantity, which made it possible to finish the skidding before the first frosts.

Decauville produced track elements, engines and cars. Those were exported to many countries, in particular to the colonial possessions of European powers. In 1878 Paul Decauville was given permission to build the Jardin d'Acclimatation railway in order to demonstrate passenger transport operations on his railway system during the Exposition Universelle of 1878.

== Factories ==
=== Petite-Synthe ===
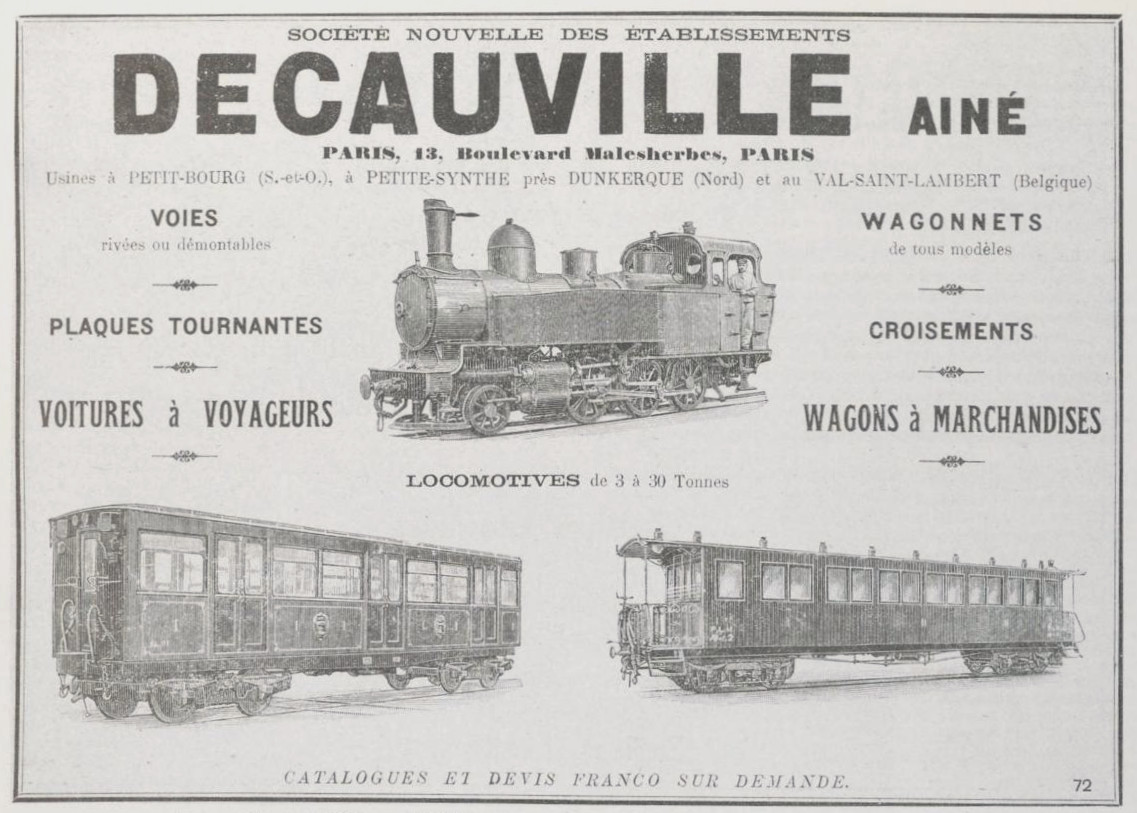
Decauville factories in Petit-Bourg, in Petite-Synthe near Dunkerque and in Val-Saint-Lambert, ca 1900-1909

The Decauville factory in Petite-Synthe produced prefabricated narrow gauge railway track and rolling stock from 1903 to 1922 in Petite-Synthe near Dunkirk, France.

The factory belonged to Etablissements Decauville ainé, a French manufacturer focussing on the production and sales of narrow gauge railway material. The factory was located near the Aciéries de France in the Nord département in northern France.

The plant produced narrow gauge railway equipment for the colonies. It was sold in 1922 and its activities were taken over by the Decauville factory in Marquette-lez-Lille.

== The railway ==
=== First trades ===
From 1876, the workshops endeavored to perfect the track system and the rolling stock. It was at the same time generalized within the farm: evacuation of the manure, transport of parts in the workshops, etc. After a little less than a year of tests and improvements, the first elements were marketed: the tracks and a wagon chassis, to be adapted according to the needs of the buyer.

In order to demonstrate the effectiveness of its "portable" railway system, Decauville obtained the concession for the Tramway de Pithiviers à Toury (TPT) which ensured, until 1964, a large traffic in sugar beet as well as occasionally the transport of passengers.

Two years after the sugar beet episode, the success of the "Porteur Decauville" is such that elements were sold and delivered to the four corners of the planet, as the table below indicates.

=== Military use ===
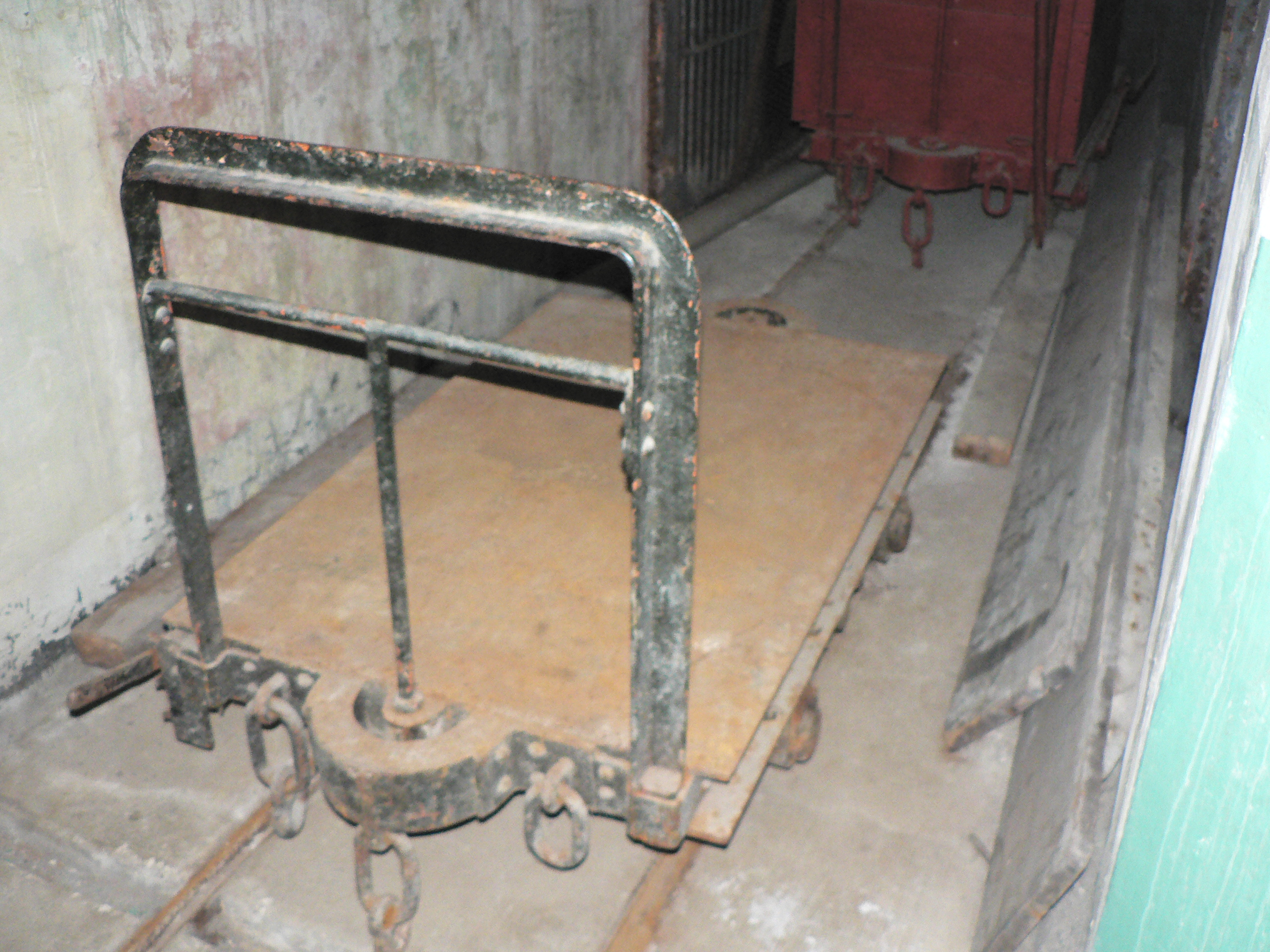
Decauville track and flat wagon in the Maginot Line in the French Alps

The French military became interested in the Decauville system as early as 1888 and chose the 600 mm (1 ft 11 5/8 in) gauge track to equip its strongholds and to carry artillery pieces and ammunition during military campaigns. Decauville track was used during the French military expeditions to Madagascar and Morocco.

By the First World War, the Decauville system had become a military standard, and the French and British eventually built thousands of miles of trench railway track. The Germans had a similar system, with normalized engines. Decauville light rail track panels were also used in UK munition plants, such as the WW1 National Filling Factories.

The Maginot Line was built with both external and internal 600 mm railways, the former served by combustion engines pulling supply trains from 1,435 mm (4 ft 8 1/2 in) standard gauge marshalling yards behind the front, and the latter, served by electric locomotives taking over the loaded wagons inside the fortifications. Tracks inside the fortresses went from the munitions entries in the rear all the way up to the fighting blocks, where ammunition loads were transferred to forward magazines using overhead monorails.

Similar feldbahn equipment was used in German South-West Africa where Otavi Minen- und Eisenbahn-Gesellschaft built the 600 mm (1 ft 11 5/8 in) gauge Otavibahn.

=== Decauville wagon ===
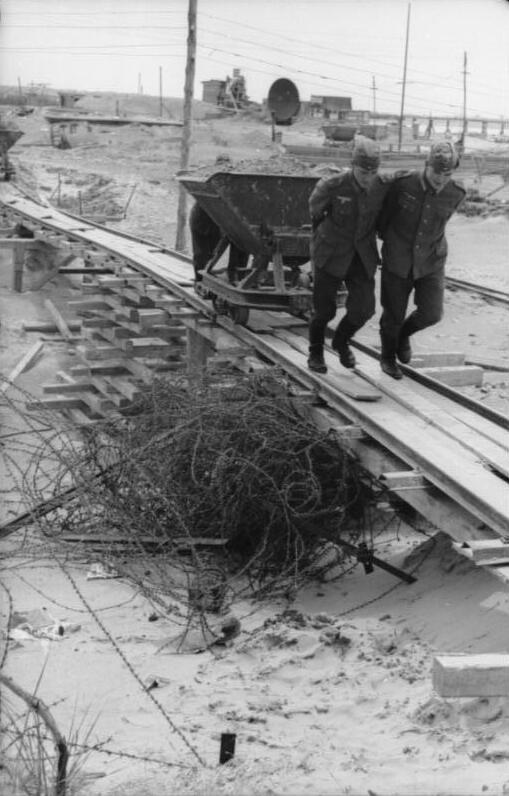
Decauville wagons were used during construction of the Atlantic Wall fortifications in the 1940s.

A Decauville wagon is a vehicle for rail freight transport, usually on 600 mm (1 ft 11 5/8 in) gauge track. It usually consists of a standard rectangular frame on which two axles are fixed without elastic suspensions. A container or other equipment is mounted on it depending on the goods to be transported. The most common type features a V-section tipper and is used for transporting bulk cargo such as sand, coal and ores. Other common types of Decauville wagons are those for the transport of logs, in this case two wagons, one for each end of the logs and without being hooked together, carry the logs fixed on forks that can rotate on a vertical axis. Other types include railcars with a reticulated case for peat and sugar cane, railcars with tank for fuel, railcars for bricks which can enter directly into the cooking ovens, railcars for people, and railroad service for the transport and laying of prefabricated tracks. During the First World War, they were also used in trench railways.

They may or may not be equipped with brakes or tow hooks, there are examples of electric self-propelled wagons or with combustion engines. Currently the Decauville railcar has evolved to become a vehicle, also with trolleys, with a continuous brake, an automatic coupling system and with devices for the automatic unloading of the transported goods.

There are also open wagons to 1,435 mm (4 ft 8 1/2 in) standard gauge attached to normal trams for example for the transport of sand to prevent ice on the route or materials necessary for the maintenance of the lines.

=== Civilian use ===
A Decauville railway was used in the construction of La Plata, Argentina, in the 1880s, and transported dignitaries from the mainline trains to the site of the founding ceremony. It was a 600 mm gauge rail built by the Province of Buenos Aires Railway, and departed from FCBAPE's Ensenada to Lomas de Tolosa (the first station established in the city).

Decauville tram installations for henequen plantations in the Mexican region of the Yucatán, were so extensive (approximately 4,500 kilometers or 2,800 miles of track) that the system became the de facto mass transit system for the region. Some ex-haciendas of the area still have small operating, usually burro (donkey)-powered, Decauville systems.

Decauville designed the steam tramway and cars used in Saigon in 1896.

Also in Argentina, Decauville portable tracks and vehicles were used to transport passengers to Ostende, a city in Atlantic coast founded in 1913. The first tourists were carried to the town using a 3 km (1.9 mi)-length railroad that ran along the beach.

Decauville wagons

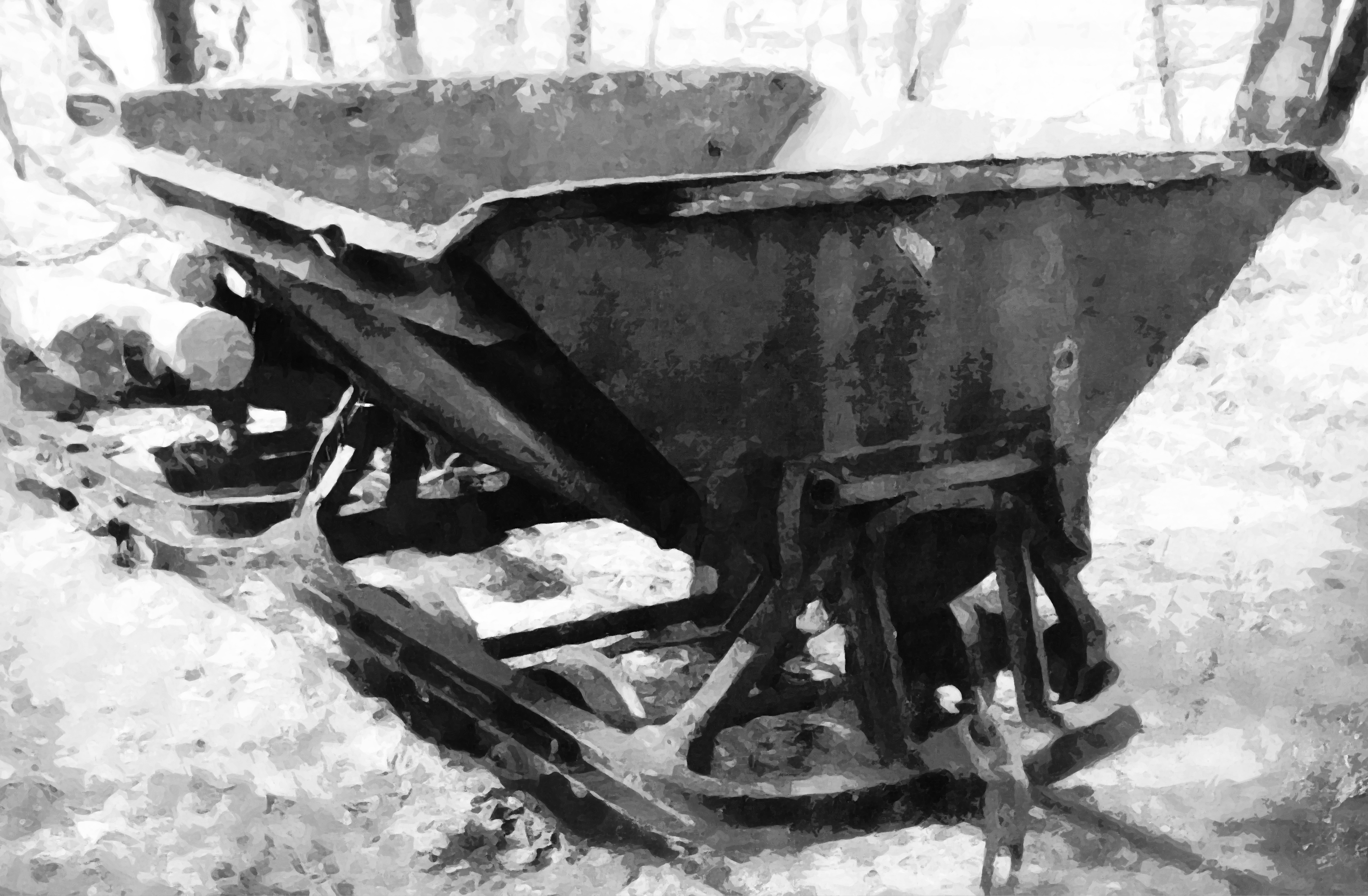
Observation cars or open wagons (Decauville wagon) used by the former Soignes Forest Railway

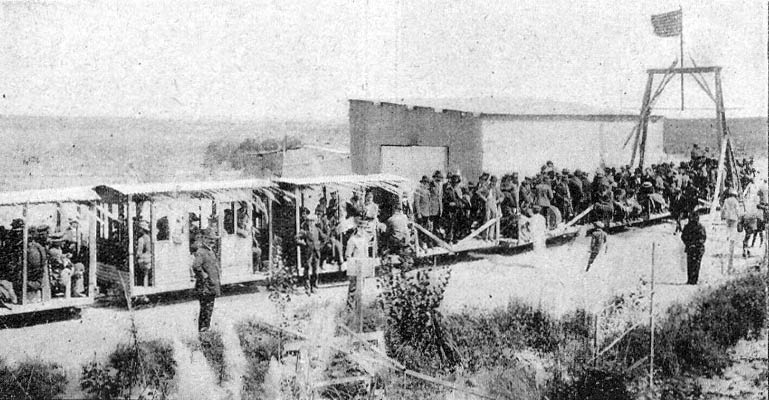
Tokio station, where passengers boarded the train to Ostende, Argentina (1913) observation car (Decauville wagon)

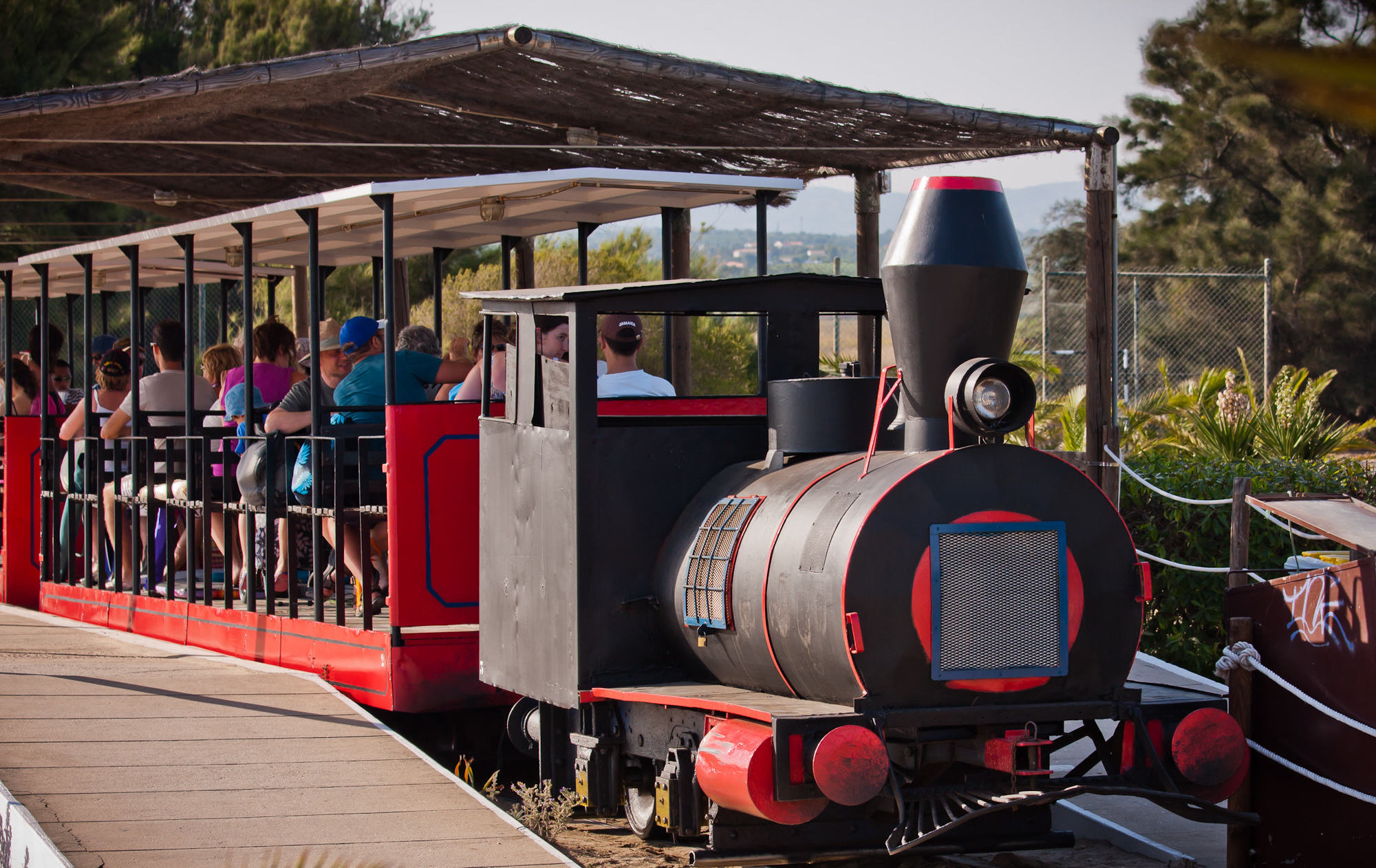
Beach train of the Comboio da Praia do Barril

== Metre-gauge equipment ==
Decauville production in the field of metre-gauge track began around 1896 with a five-ton empty 0-4-0 locomotive. Competition was strong in this field, but the company's small range proved versatile.

Thus five locomotive types are mentioned in the 1897 catalogue, ranging from 13 to 23 tonnes in operation. A 0-6-0 steam locomotive was built in 1908 as No. 512 for the line from Berck-Plage to Paris-Plage. For nonpowered stock, there were only two wagons: a "giraffe" tipping wagon and a flat ballast.

In the 1908 catalogue the range was greatly extended, to the detriment of the 600 track: Among traction equipment the five initial types were still present, but they had been refined. At this time Decauville began to specialize in network equipment for colonies, leading to the appearance of very large metre-gauge vehicles (up to 32 tonnes, such as those intended for the French Sudan railway. 20 car models were available, including several specially adapted to tropical climates. There were also 14 types of wagons, most covered.

In 1939, the Decauville company built 3 autorails of the 'DXW' type for Yunnan in China near the border with Indochina. However, the Indochina War prevented their expedition. In 1951 they were bought by SNCF which assigned them to the Breton network.

The 'Z 600' equipment for the Saint-Gervais-Vallorcine line was manufactured by Decauville and delivered in 1958.

== Vehicles ==
=== Steam locomotives ===
The first locomotives manufactured by Couillet, in Marcinelle in Belgium, were 020s, with a separate tender and designed to be transported on the back of an elephant. Decauville has collaborated with many workshops in the construction of its machines. We will mention the Tubize Metallurgical Company for the construction of the Mallet of the universal exhibition or the Weidknecht establishments.

Decauville steam locomotives

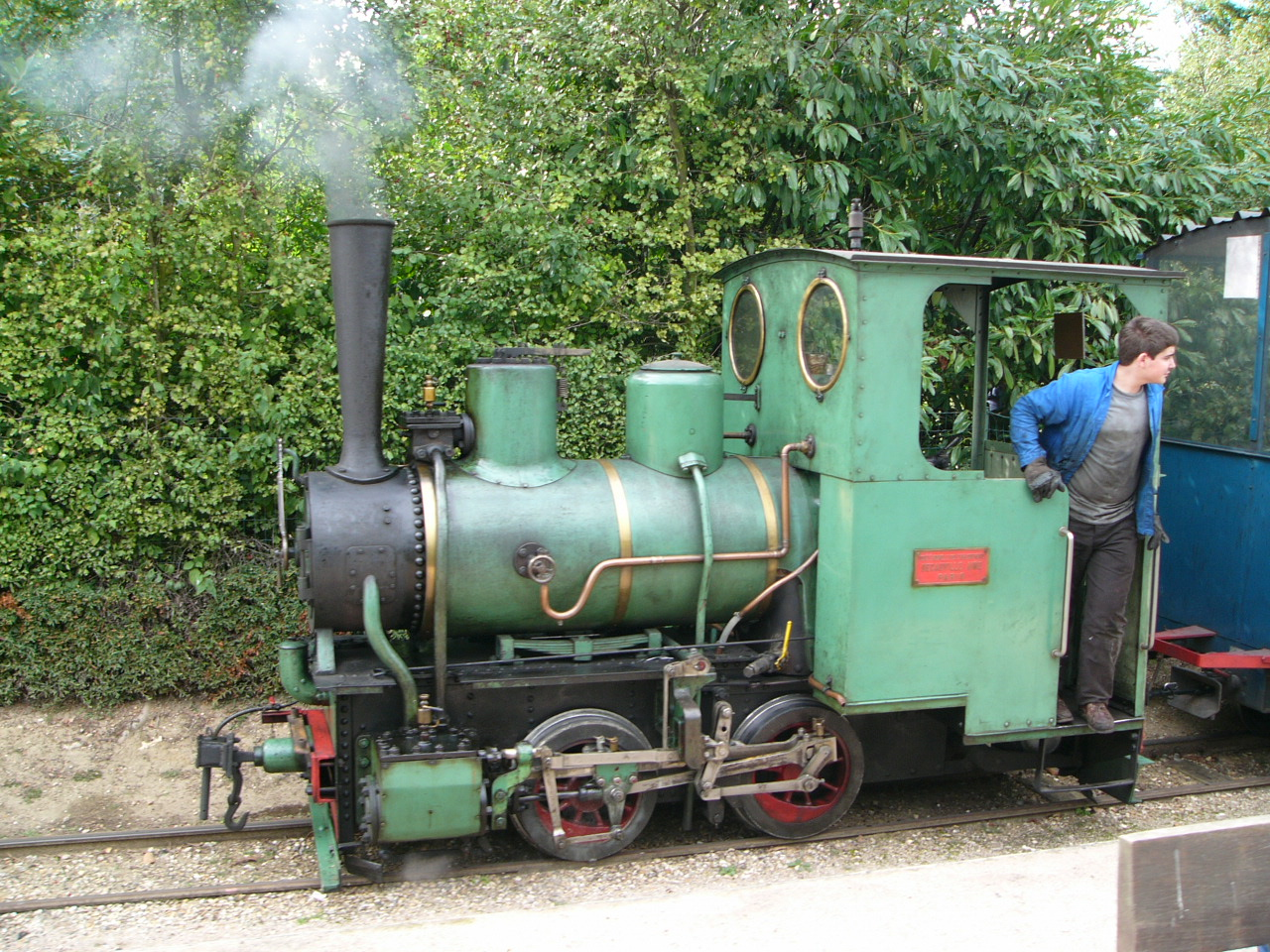
Decauville 0-4-0WT steam locomotive, Hauts-de-Seine, France

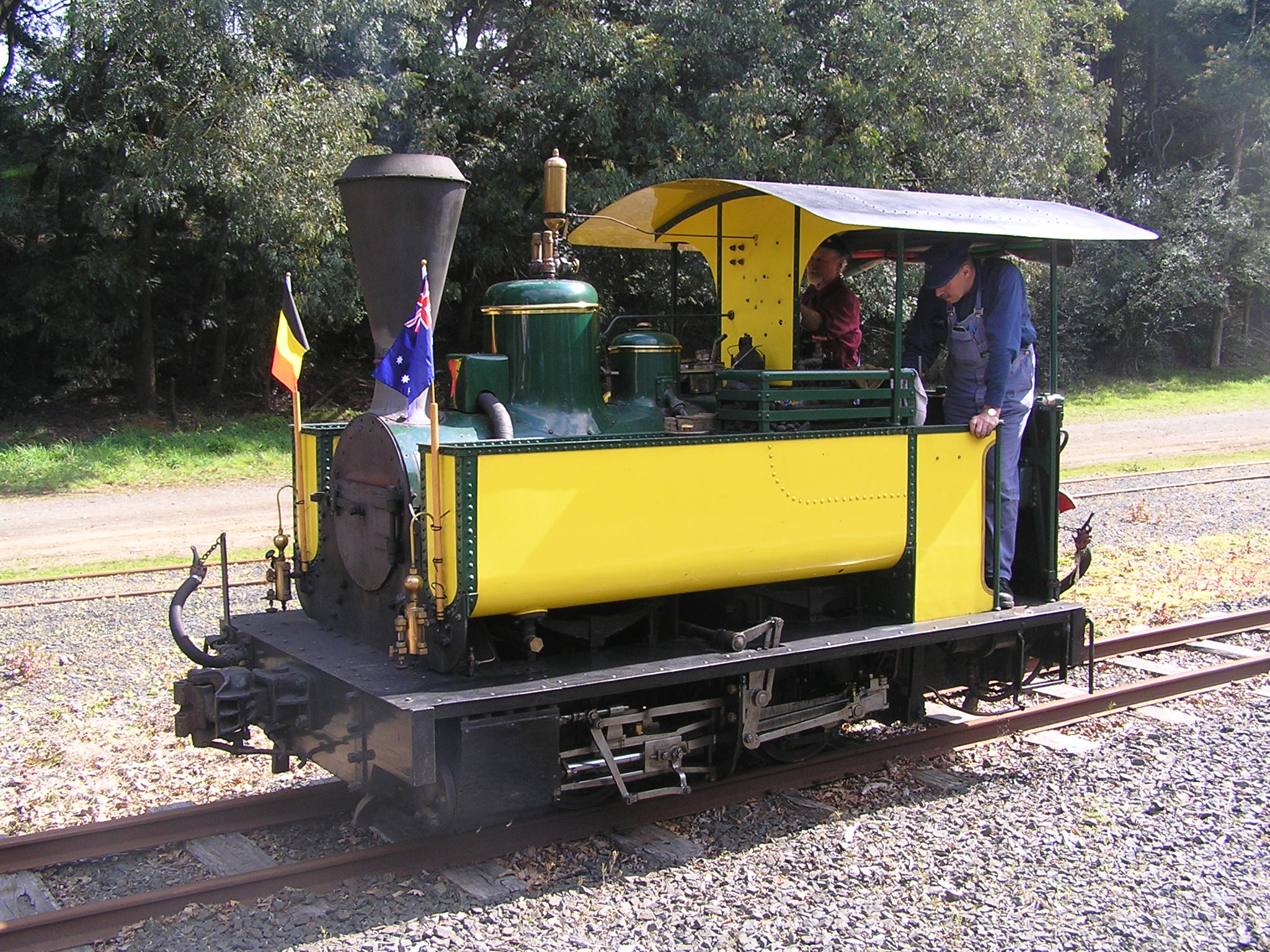
Locomotive 020, built by Couillet in Belgium for the West Melbourne Gasworks, and preserved in Australia

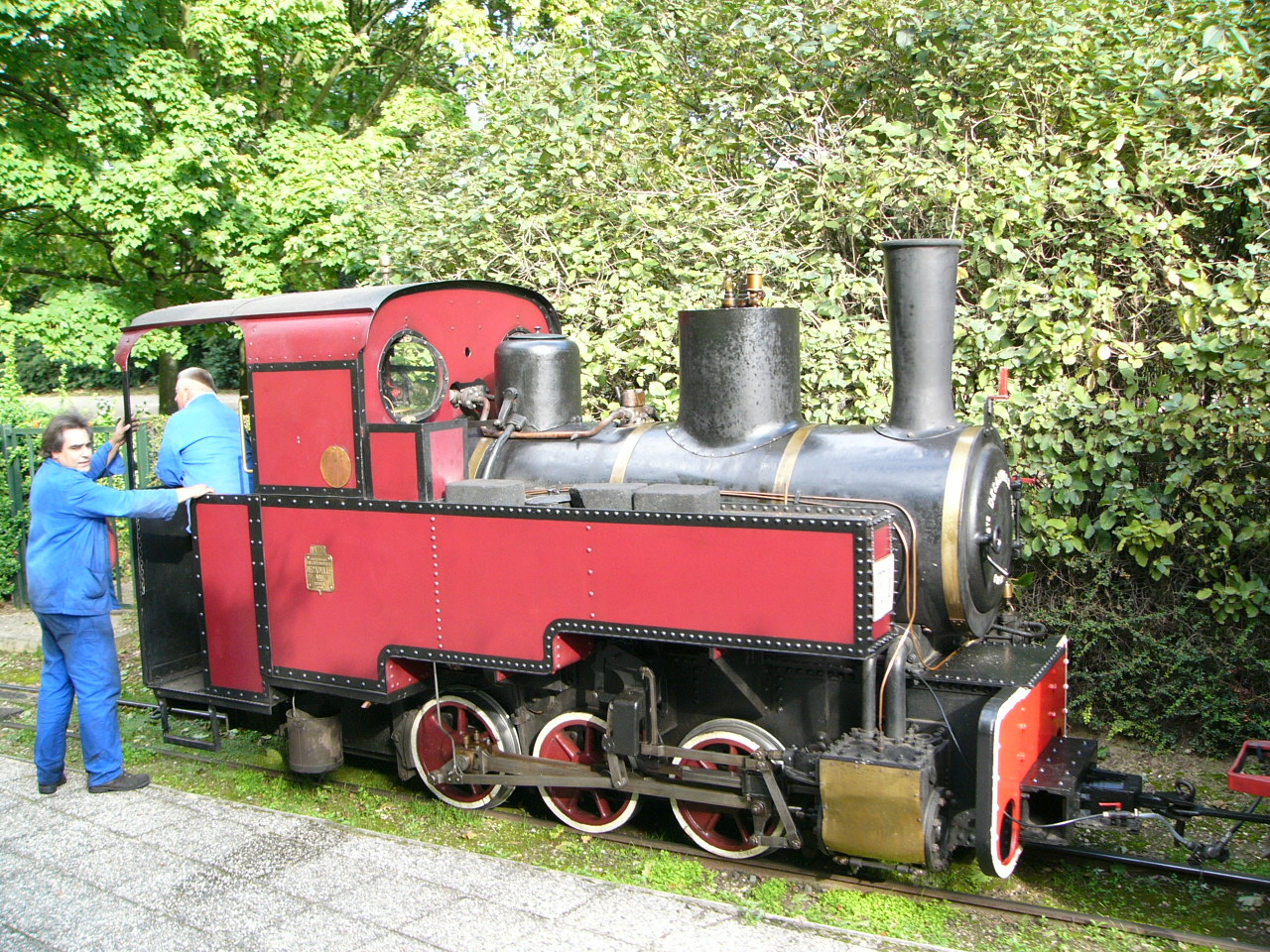
Locomotive Decauville 030

=== Gallery of Decauville rail products ===
Decauville products and installations

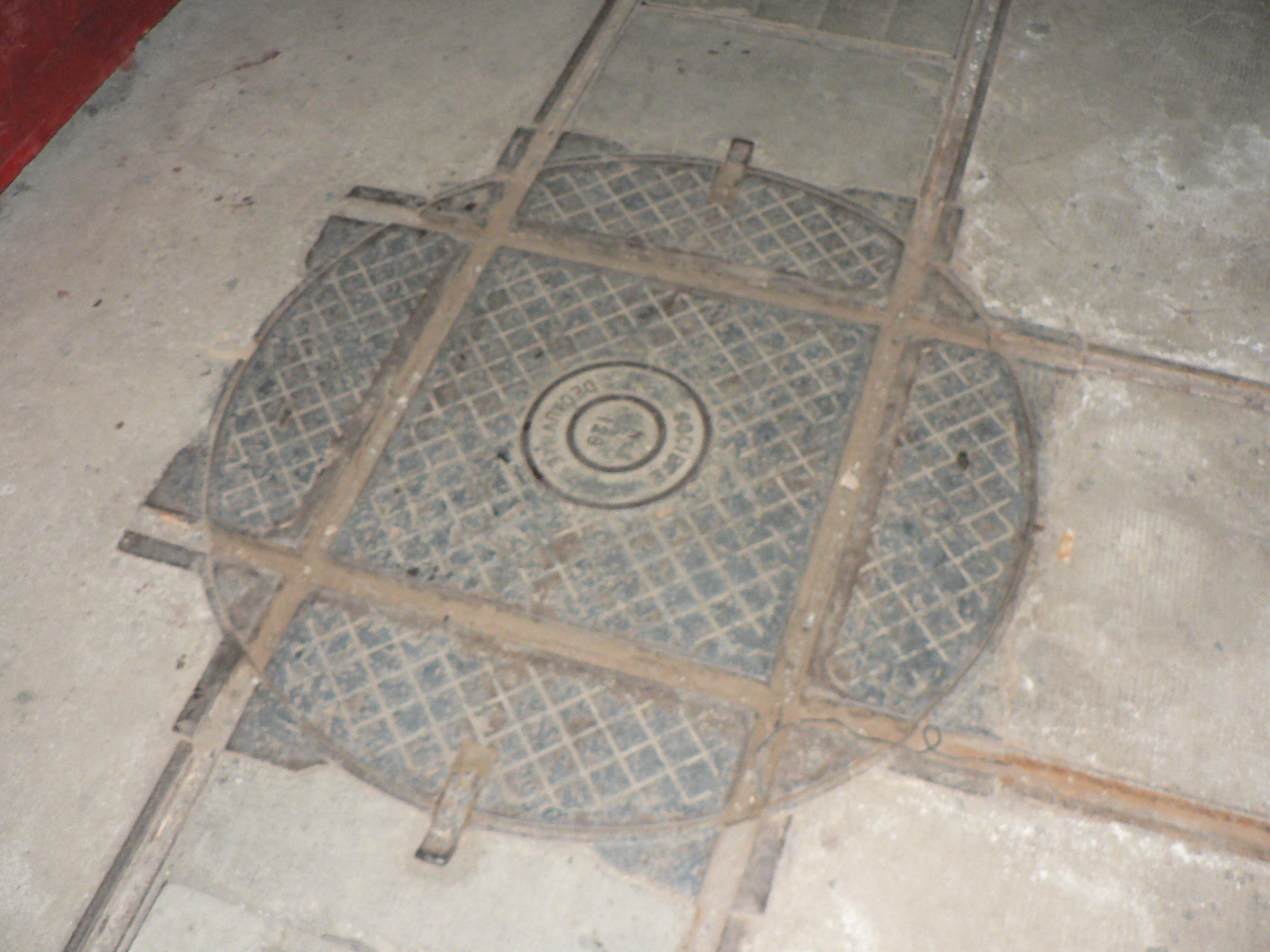
Turntable

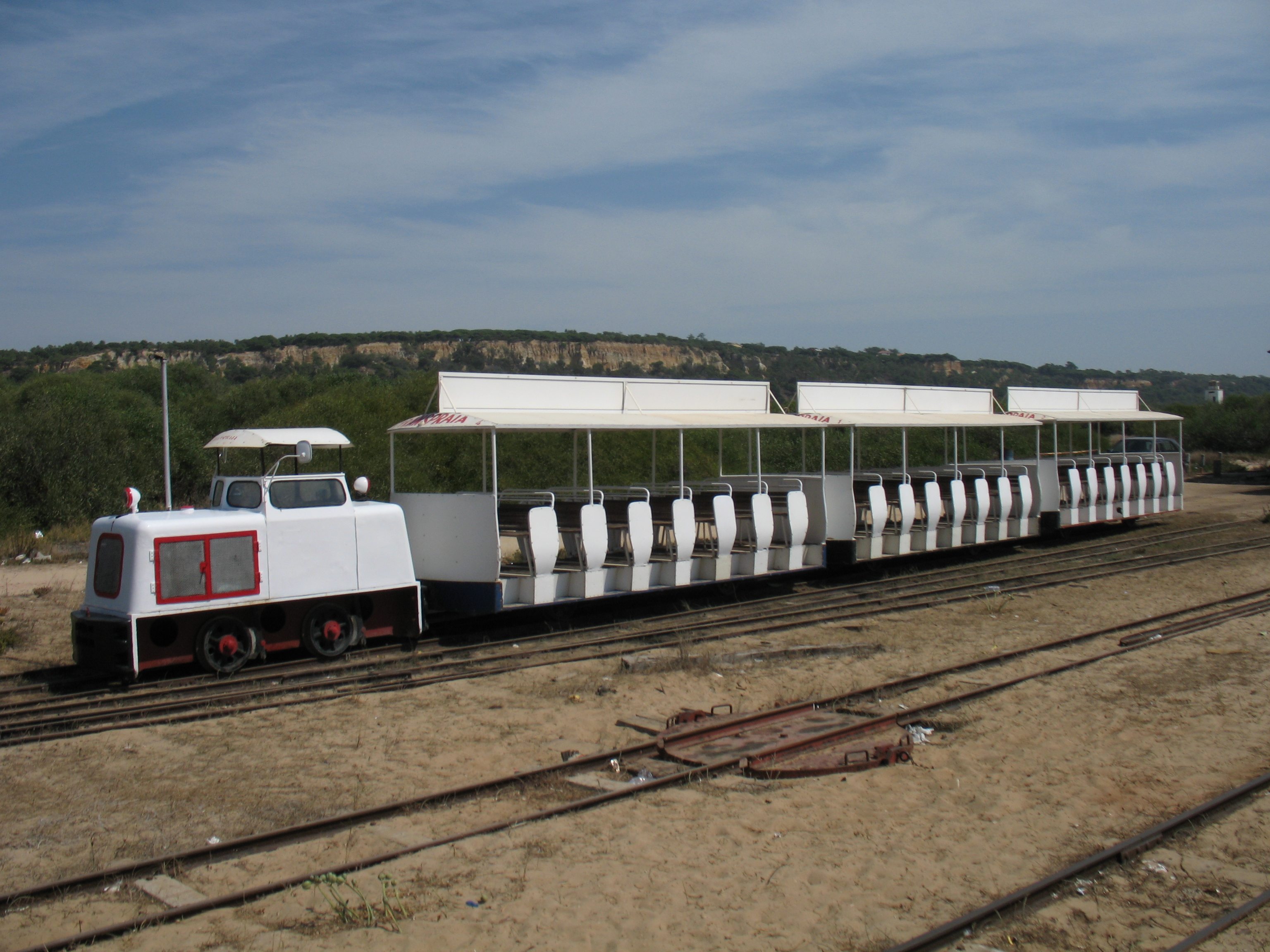
Decauville system tourist train at Costa da Caparica, Portugal

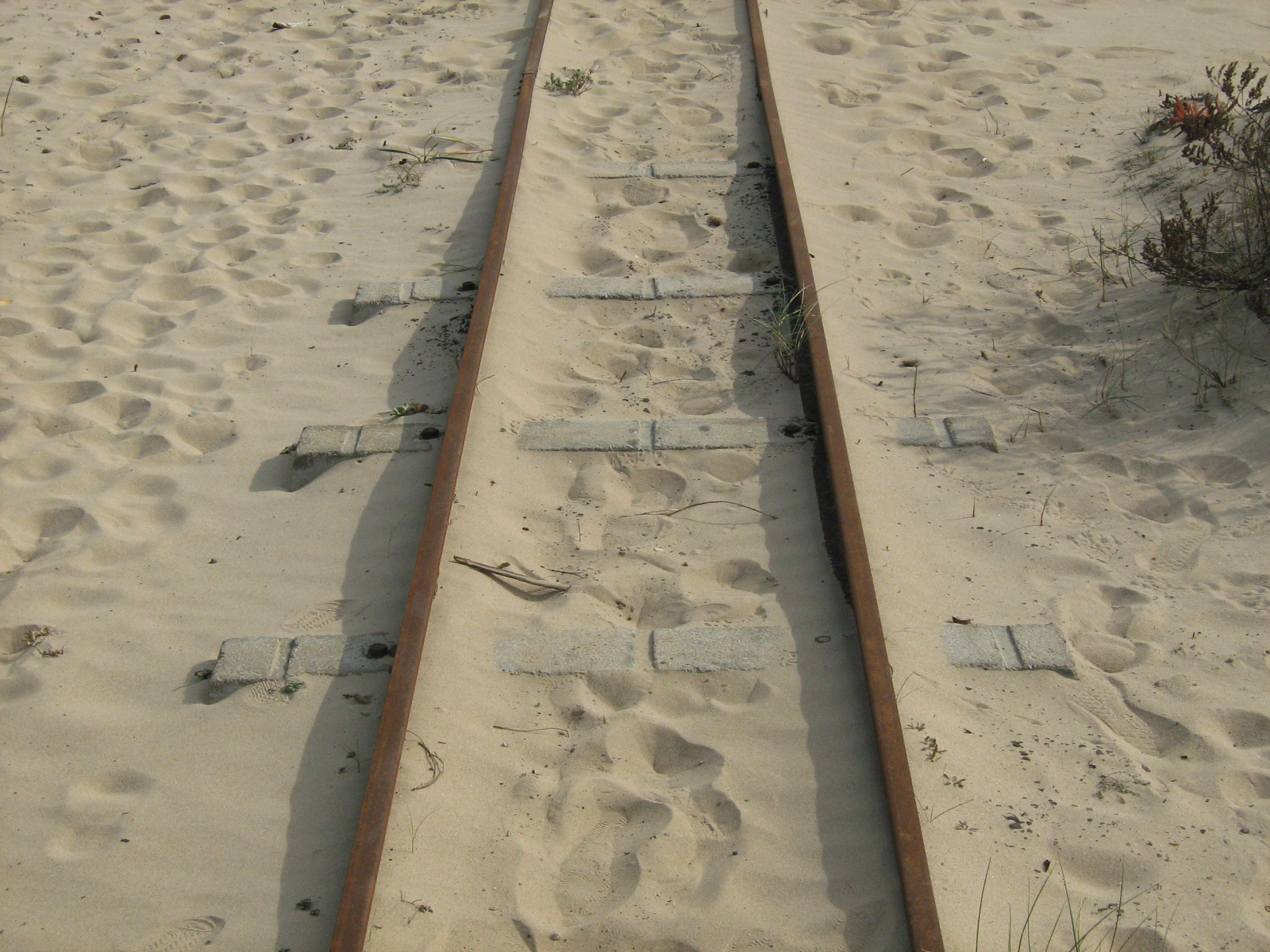
Decauville track from Transpraia, Costa da Caparica, Portugal

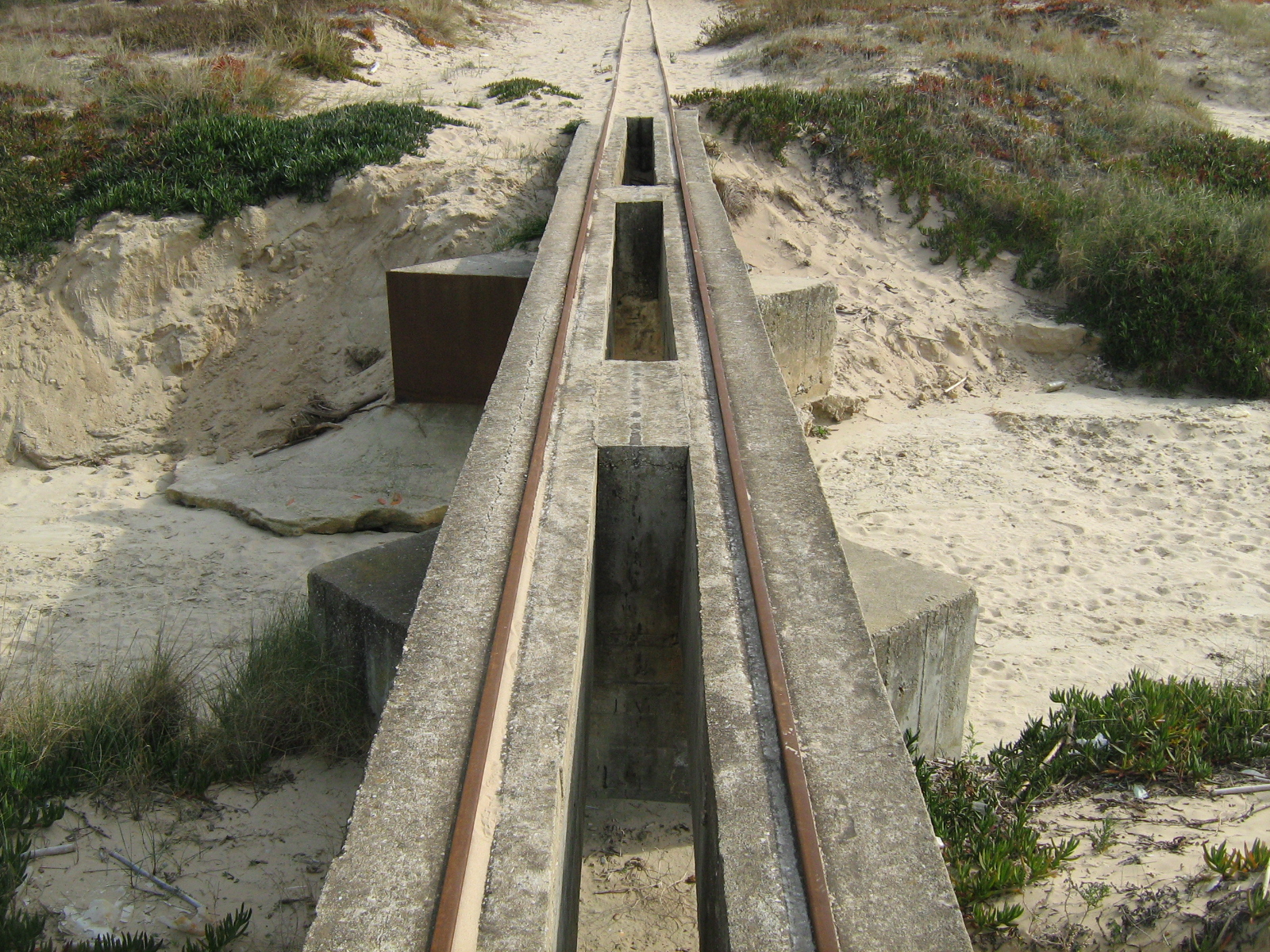
Decauville track on a small bridge, Costa da Caparica, Portugal

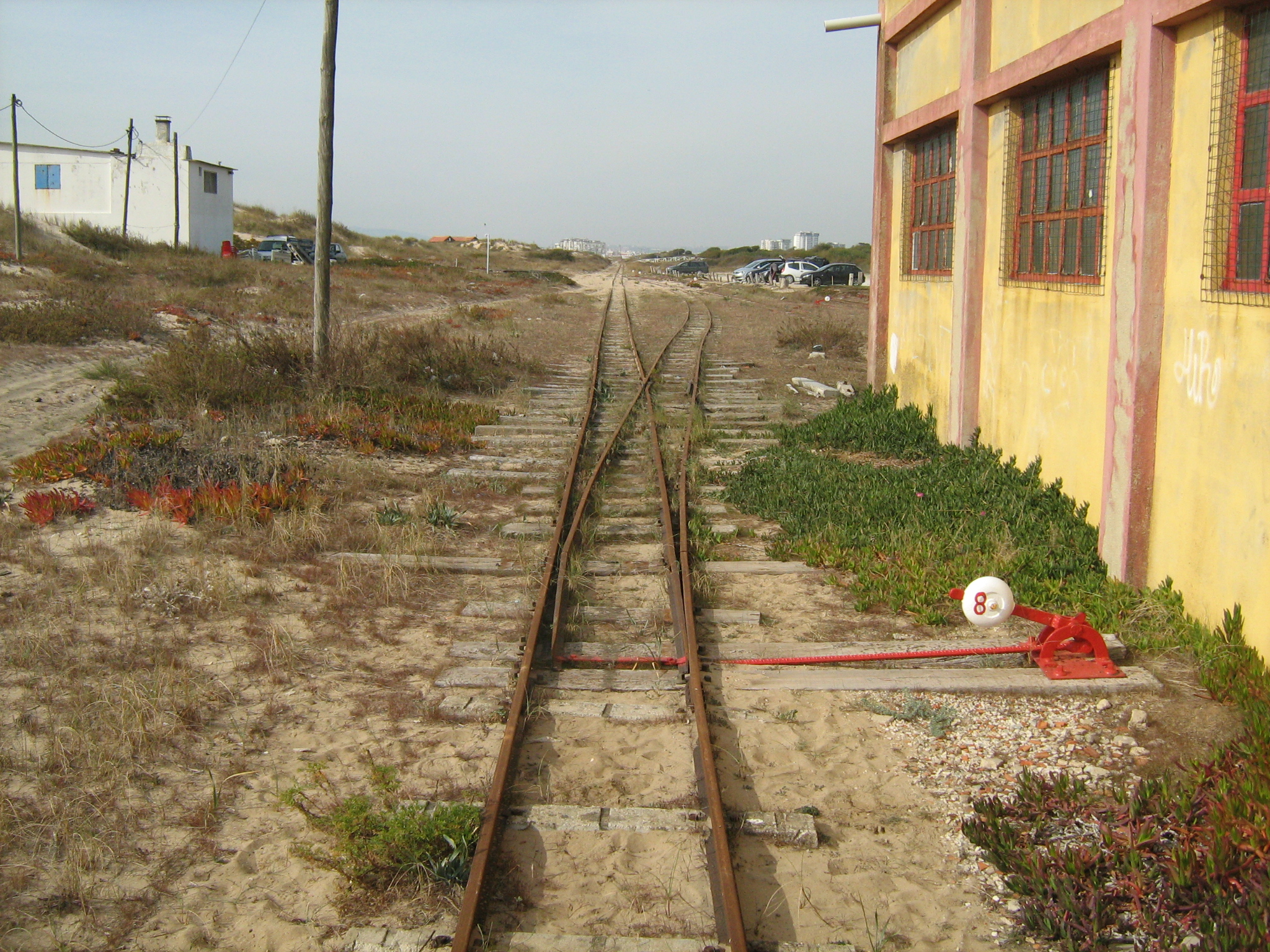
Decauville track junction, Costa da Caparica, Portugal

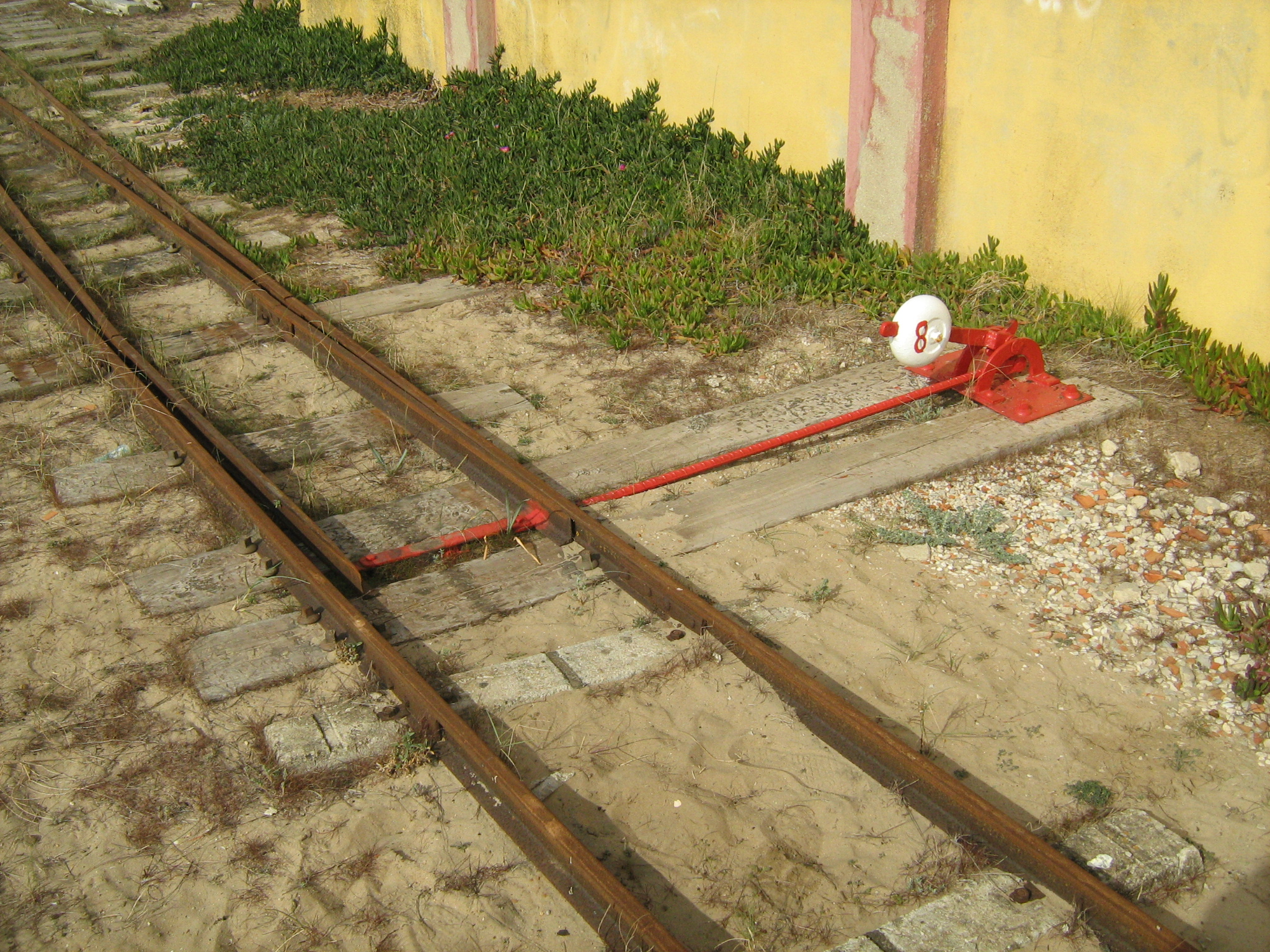
Decauville track switch, Costa da Caparica, Portugal

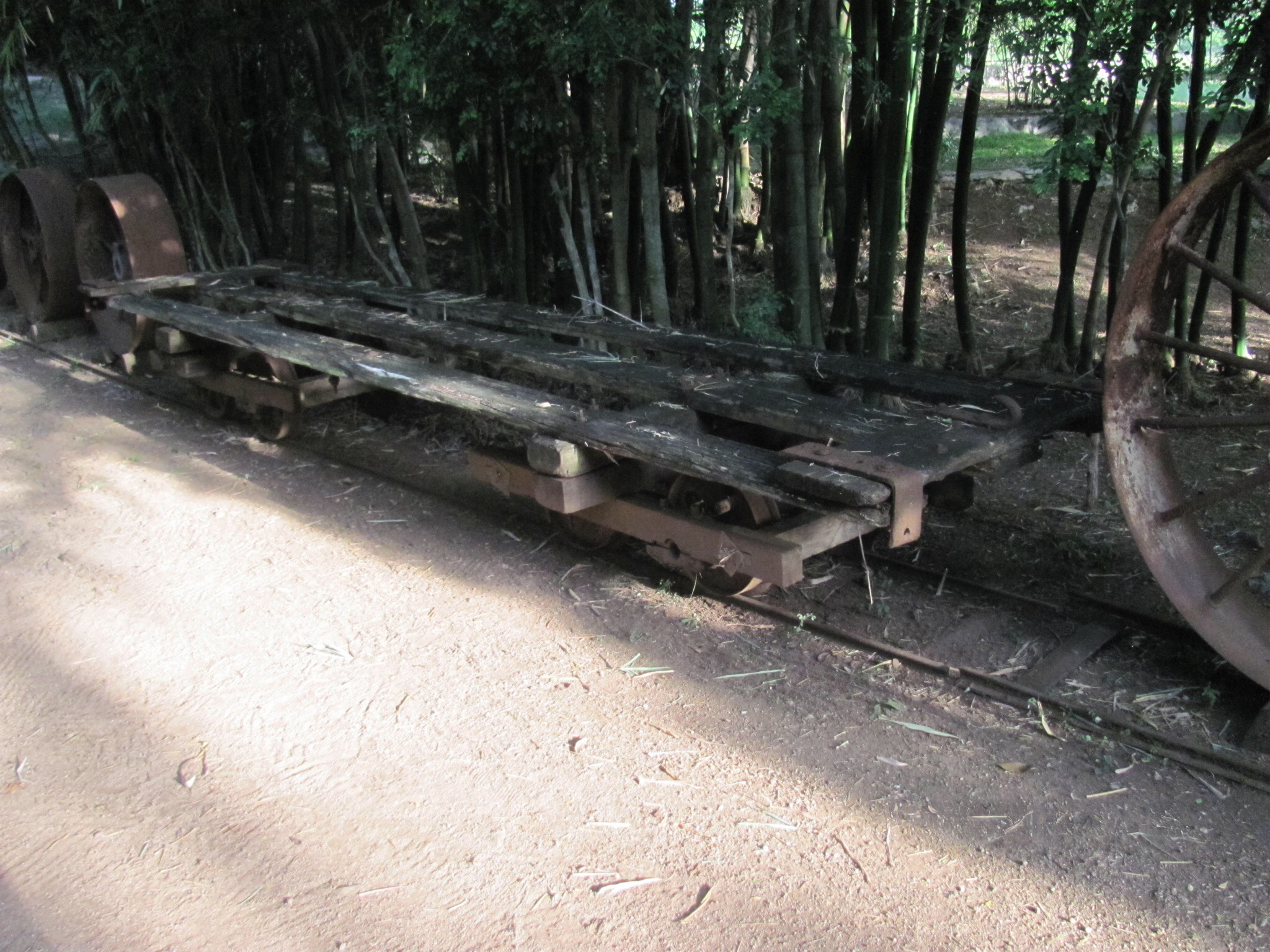
Sisal train at hacienda Yaxcopoil, Yucatan, Mexico

Legacy Decauville horse tram in use in Yucatán.

== Other manufactures ==
In addition to railways, the company diversified very early on in many fields: agricultural machinery, electric motors, cycles and automobiles by offering the "carelle" in 1898, a voiturette driven in particular during the first Tour de France automobile by Fernand Gabriel (winner of the category), by Léon Théry (second then, still winner of the 1900 Coupe des Voiturettes and active with the brand from 1899 to 1902), and by Franz Ullmann (completed the lightweight class triple at the Tour de France, also present from 1899 to 1902), Paul Decauville competed in the first of the races in which his creations took part, in 1899 during the Nice-Castellane-Nice (it happened 15th. In the US, Henri Page obtained a few race podiums and three victories out of 10 and 15 miles (16 and 24 km) at Yonkers, Empire City, NY., for 1903 with a 40 hp (30 kW). In 1904 and 1905, William Hilliard, Guy Vaughn (mainly him, with about ten short races contested in 1905), Leland Mitchell and Huggins won several competitions on American circuits.

=== Cycles ===
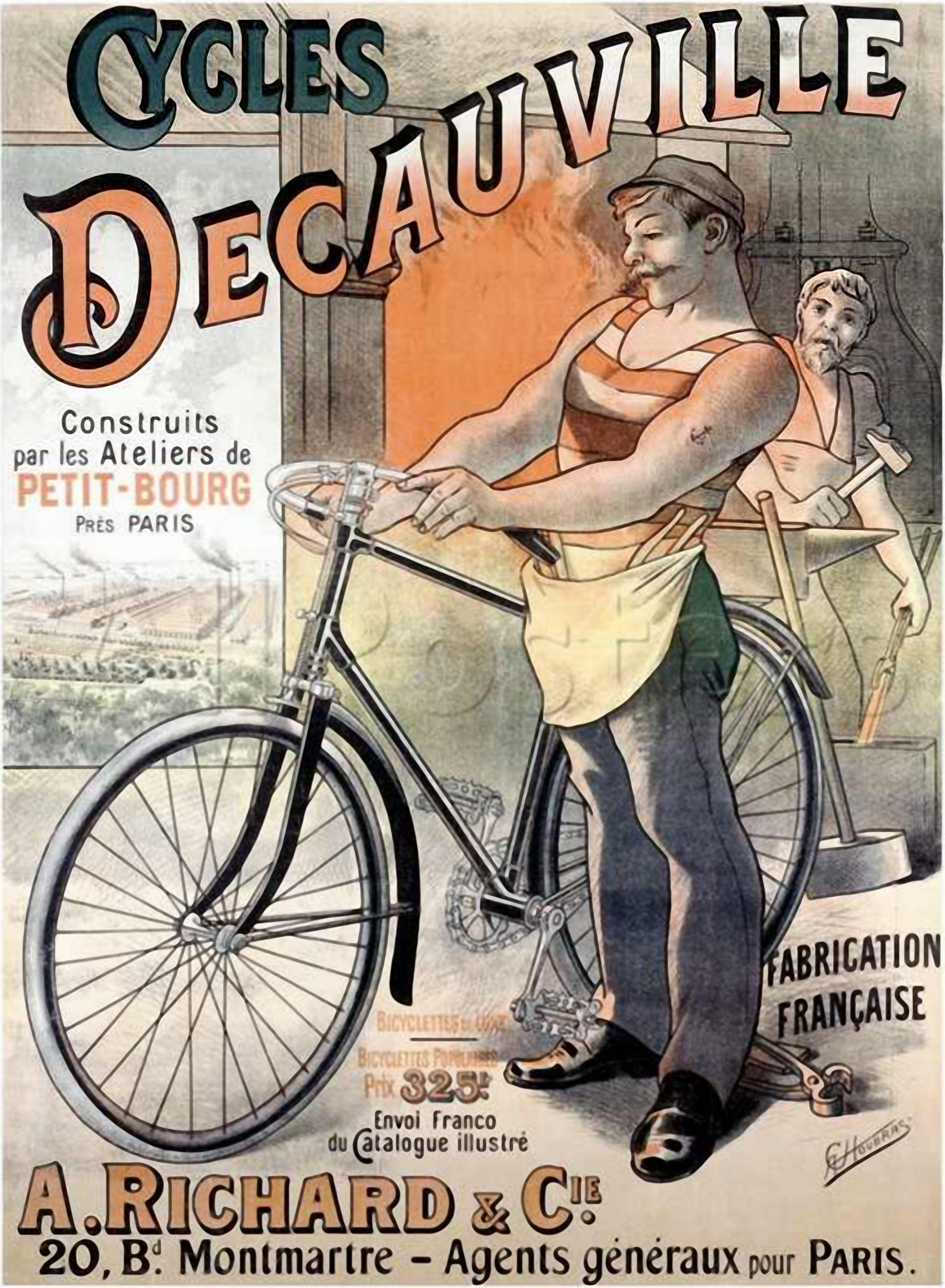
Decauville cycles ad, art by Alfred Choubrac, c. 1892;

From 1891 to 1902, Decauville produced six models of cycles, some of which were equipped to be able to travel on the railway, by adding a system made up of three tubes and a roller. The emblematic production of this range is that of the tricycle, which serve, among other things, as the basis for the prototype at De Dion-Bouton.

=== Automobiles ===
The Decauville company, via its Decauville automobile car subsidiary, entered the automobile industry alongside the De Dion-Bouton company, for which it had produced 3,000 motor tricycles. After several years of study, Decauville presented its Voiturelle (1898-1903) This small three-seater vehicle, designed in Bordeaux by two engineers from the maritime couriers, was equipped with a gasoline engine. Decauville studied a new chassis which was presented in 1902 at the cycle show. Surprisingly modular (it was possible to interchange seats and engines) this Decauville 1902 model was a great success. However, from 1907 orders fell and a crisis began. Decauville's lack of responsiveness led to the cessation of activity in the “automotive” branch in 1909. The sale of models in stock continued, however, until 1911.

Decauville automobiles

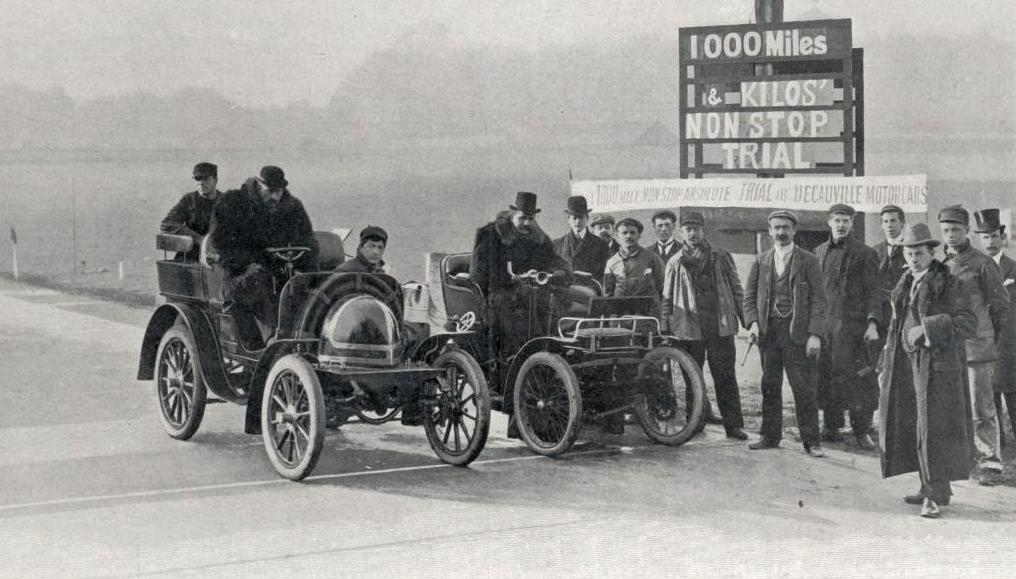
Two Decauvilles at the start of the 'One Thousand Miles' from London, on the Crystal-Palace track in April 1900

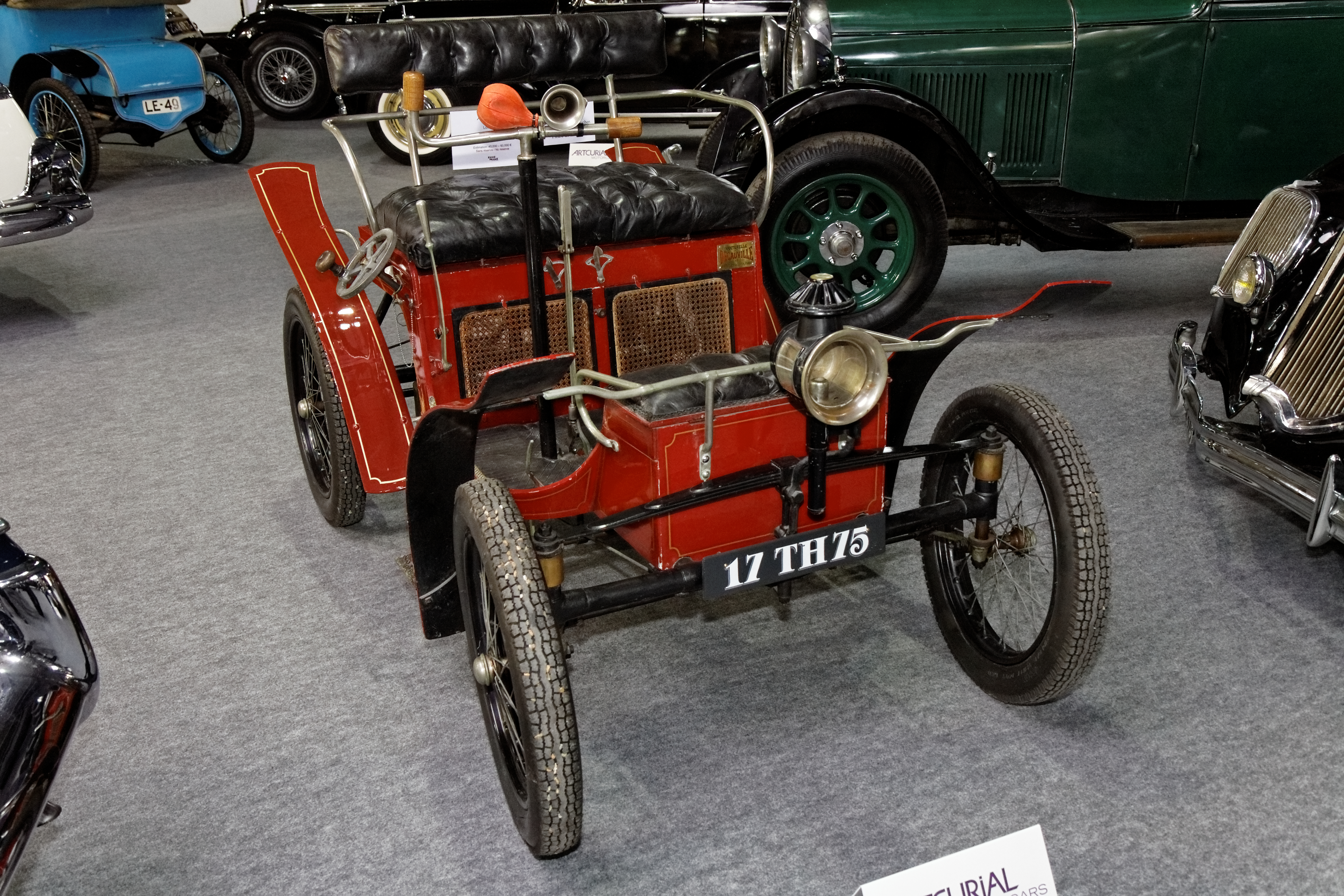
lA car from 1898/1899

== See also ==
- Bathurst Decauville Tramway
- Benjamin Constant railway
- Decauville automobile
- Decauville Tramway at Exposition Universelle in Gent, 1913
- Decauville wagon
- Feldbahn
- Forest railway
- Heeresfeldbahn
- Industrial railway
- Light railway
- List of Decauville railways
- Military railways
- Minimum-gauge railway
- Mountain railway
- Schöma
- Trench railways
- Mogadishu-Villabruzzi Railway extension
