= Decauville factory in Marquette-lez-Lille =

Coordinates: 50.672353°N 3.059049°E

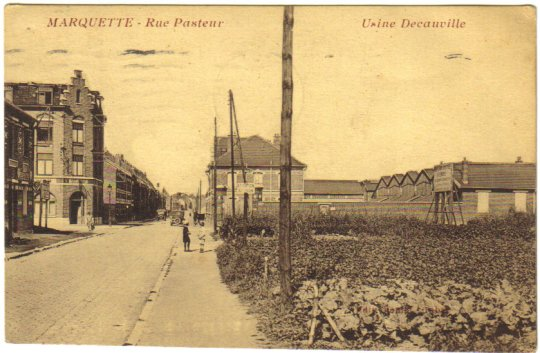
Usine Decauville, Marquette, Rue Pasteur, around 1923

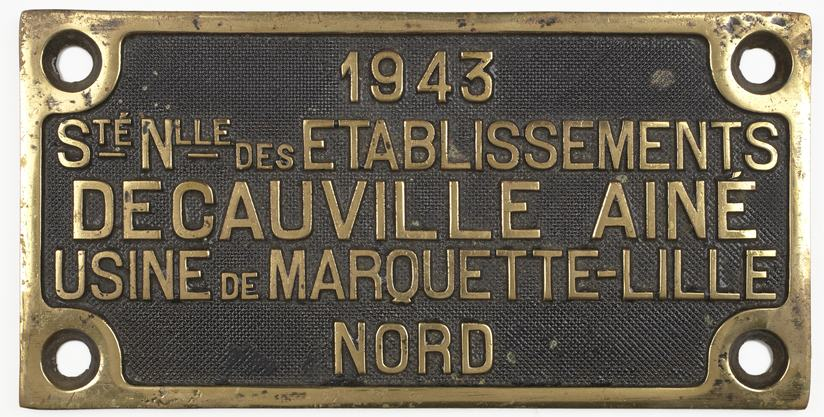
Manufacturer's plate, 1943

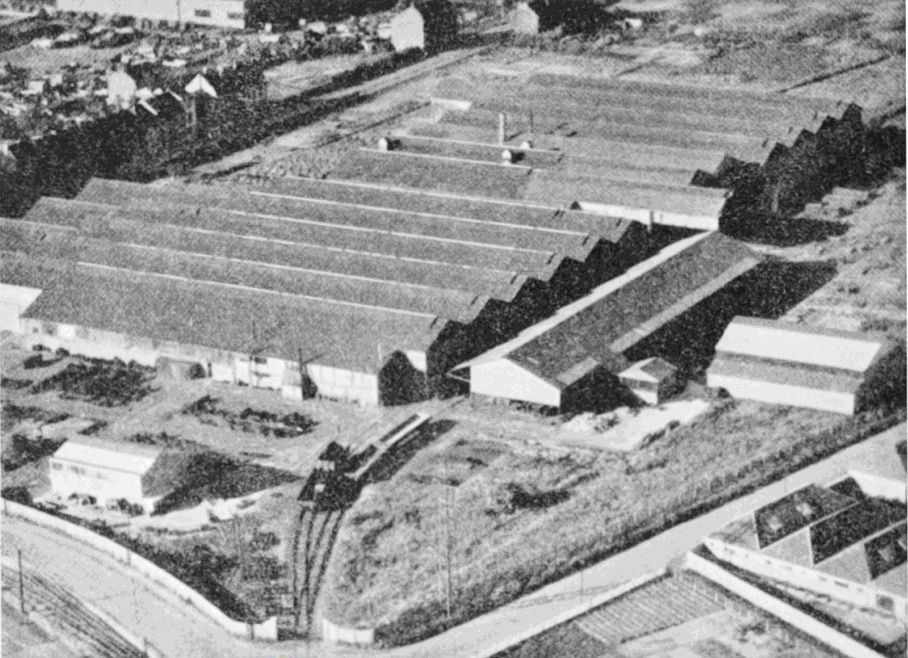
Deauville factory in Marquette-lez-Lille, around 1950

The Decauville factory in Marquette-lez-Lille produced locomotives and construction machinery from 1923 to 1968.

== History ==
The Decauville plant was opened in 1923 not far from the Massey-Ferguson factory in Marquette. It was one of the four Decauville factories alongside those in Corbeil-Essonnes, Aulnay-sous-Bois and Moulins. The advantages of the location were the availability of extensive land and good accessibility for steel and iron via numerous railway lines. The Deûle Canal was not used as the metal came by rail from Lorraine.

In 1954, Decauville employed 400 people in Marquette, and in 1958 even 500. The site covered more than 80,000 m^{2} (8 ha), including 18,000 m^{2} in buildings, with good opportunities for expansion.

Instead of riveted products, welded products were increasingly manufactured. Shunting locomotives were the main products on the site as well as commercial vehicles and construction and mining machinery such as forklift trucks, dump trucks, wheel loaders and construction compressors. Half of the production was exported.

At the end of the 1950s, the Decauville Group ran into financial difficulties due to the changing markets, and a new direction was taken in Marquette. The signing of an agreement with a German company for the realisation of large construction equipment was intended to revive the activity of the northern site. The Franco-German agreement came into force in 1963. Five years later, in the summer of 1968, the closure of the plant was announced, 45 years after its opening.

Some local companies then tried to invest in the premises, but their activities were not sustainable.
