= Guerry et Bourguignon =

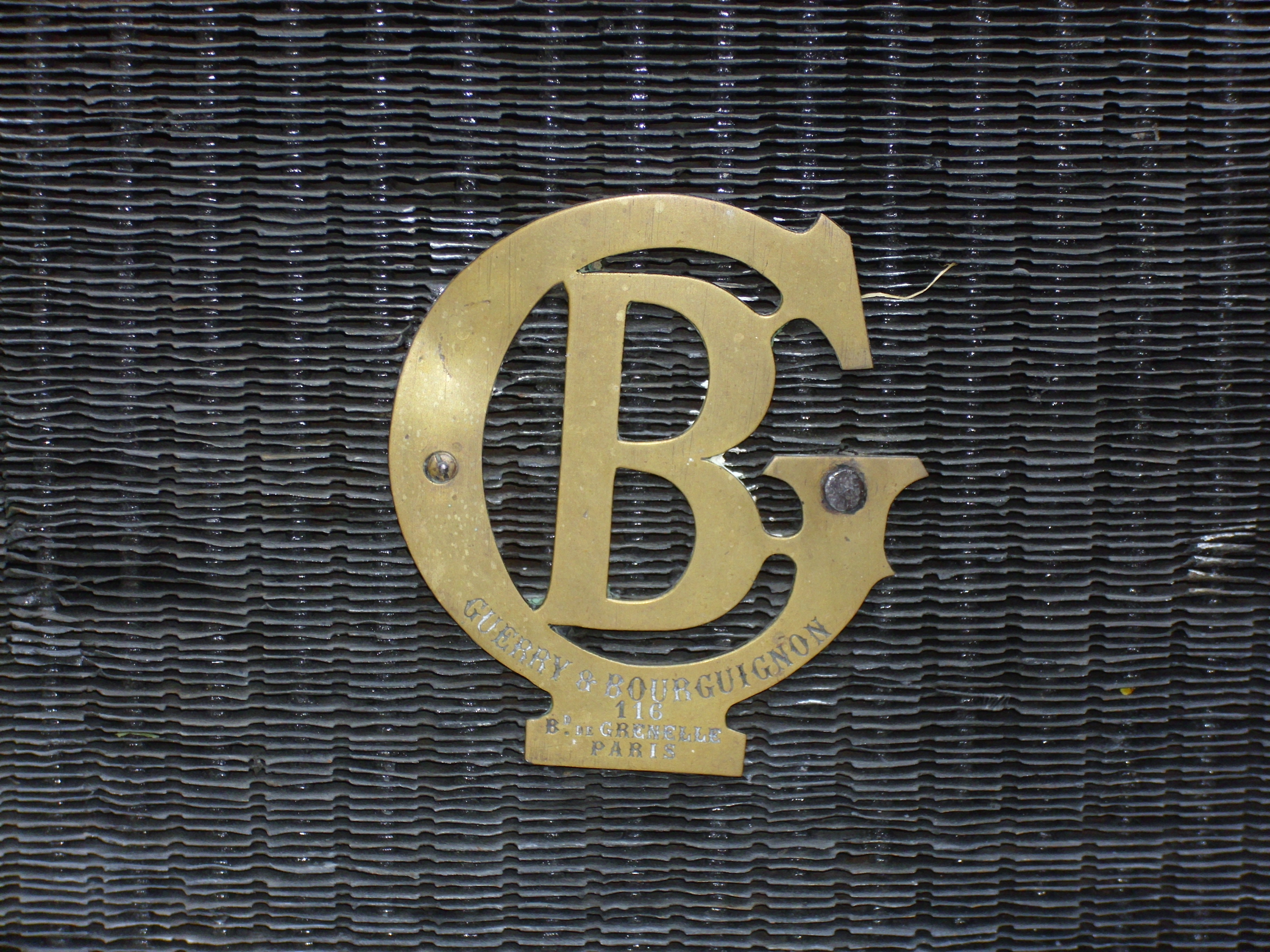
Guerry et Bourguignon emblem

The Guerry et Bourguignon was a French automobile built only in 1907 by a cycle company from Paris. It was described as a "tri-voiturette".
