= Petite-Synthe =

Coordinates: 51°1′10″N 2°20′48″E

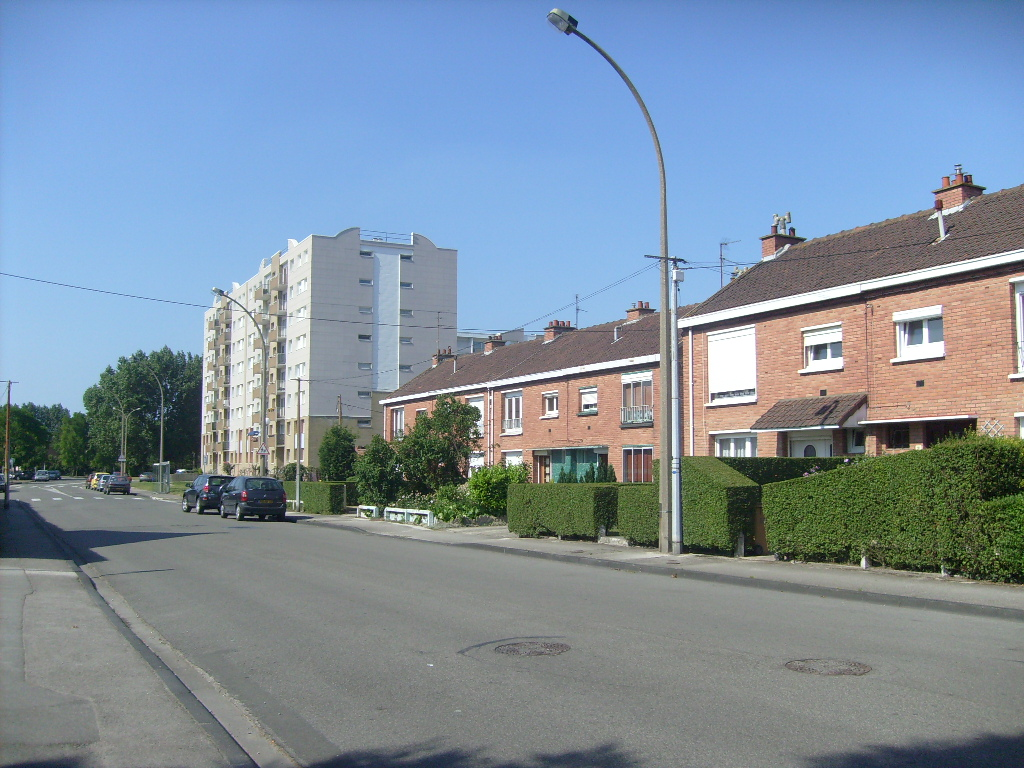
Concor de Petite-Synthe

Petite-Synthe (French pronunciation: [pətit sɛ̃t]; West Flemish: Klein-Sinten) is a former commune of the Nord département in northern France.

The commune of Saint-Pol-sur-Mer was created in 1877, by its territory being detached from Petite-Synthe. In 1971 the commune of Dunkerque absorbed Petite-Synthe and Rosendaël. In 1980, a large part of Petite-Synthe was detached from Dunkerque and merged into Grande-Synthe.

== Industry ==
Petite-Synthe was the location of several industrial companies:

=== Decauville ===
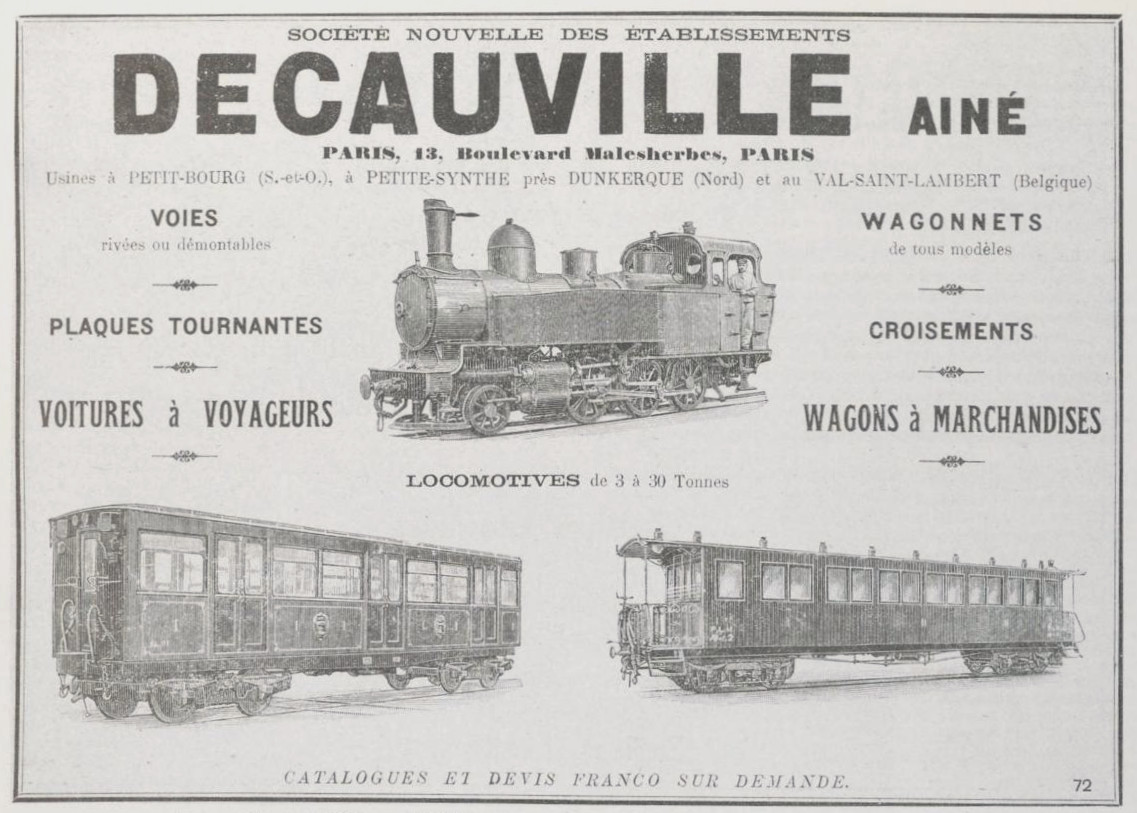
Decauville factories in Petit-Bourg, in Petite-Synthe near Dunkerque and in Val-Saint-Lambert, ca 1900-1909

The Decauville factory in Petite-Synthe produced prefabricated narrow gauge railway track and rolling stock from 1903 to 1922. The factory belonged to Etablissements Decauville ainé, a French manufacturer focussing on the production and sales of narrow gauge railway material. The factory was located near the Aciéries de France. The plant produced narrow gauge railway equipment for the colonies. It was sold in 1922 and its activities were taken over by the Decauville factory in Marquette-lez-Lille.

=== Carell & Fouché ===
The Carell & Fouché factory in Petite-Synthe was built on a plot of forty hectares, ten of which are built on, along the Bourbourg Canal, adjoining the territory of Grande Synthe. Its location allowed transport by the canal by rail and increasingly by road. It changed its name to Societe des Ateliers des Deux-Synthe, Venot-Pesselin, and Carrel-Fouche-Languepin. The factory had employed up to 400 people before World War II. Business took a turn for the worse with the manufacture of the footbridges at Roissy Airport, the construction of which was delayed, and with the cancellation of the delivery of railway equipment during the Algerian War. The factory closed its doors on 15 April 1971. The other factories in the group were in Le Mans and Aubevoye. The parent company Carel-Fouché-Industries SA was taken over by the GEC-Alstom Group. It closed permanently in 1989.

== Heraldry ==
Arms of Petite-Synthe	The arms of Petite-Synthe are blazoned : Argent, a cross moline gules between 4 bells sable.
