= Decauville factory in Moulins =

Coordinates: 46.58123°N 3.32679°E

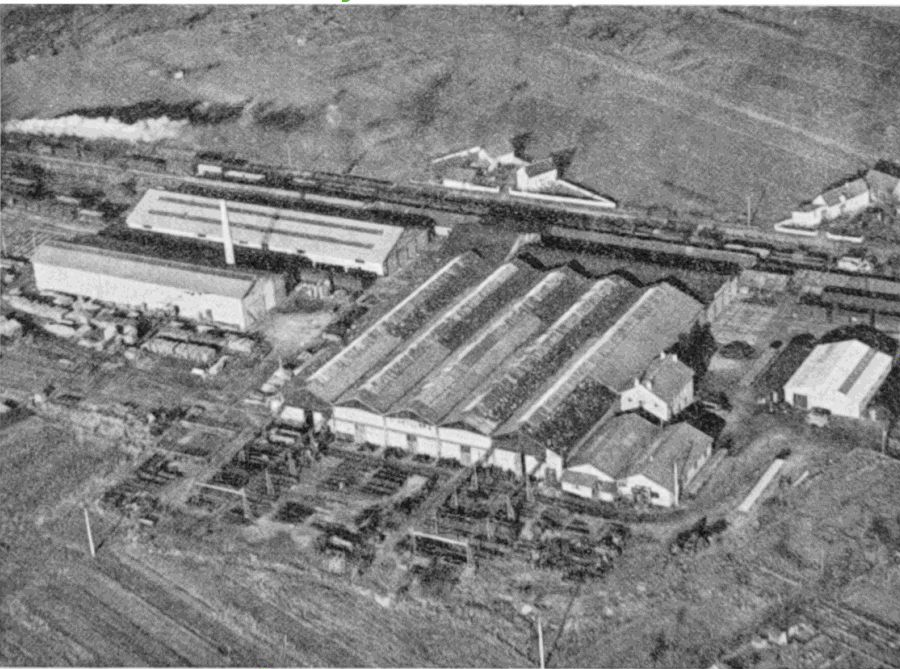
The Decauville factory in Moulins, aerial view, around 1953

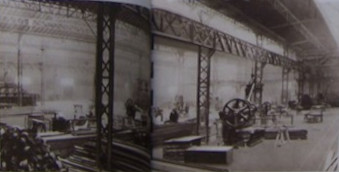
The Decauville factory in Moulins, internal view, around 1918

The Decauville factory in Moulins was used from 1918 to 1959 by the French railway supplier Decauville at Moulins, Allier.

== History ==
The factory belonged to the French company Société Nouvelle des Établissements Decauville Aîné and was located in the French Auvergne-Rhône-Alpes region of the département Allier. It was built in 1918 during World War I far from the front, to produce military material (tanks, shells), which it ultimately never did. Its main activities were the construction and maintenance of standard gauge wagons for the Compagnie des chemins de fer de Paris à Lyon et à la Méditerranée and Compagnie du chemin de fer de Paris à Orléans. They also made stationary steam engines.

The plant was sold in 1959 during the economic crisis to Potain SA, a French manufacturer of tower cranes, which was finally taken over by Manitowoc Company in 2001.
