= Esculapeus =

The Esculapeus was a British automobile manufactured for one year only, 1902. A "chainless" voiturette, it had a five-horsepower twin engine. Befitting its name, the car was designed for doctors (Asclepius was the Roman God of medicine and healing), and came complete with a locker for their bags, as well as full weather protection.

== See also ==
- List of car manufacturers of the United Kingdom
