= Guerraz =

The Guerraz was a French automobile manufactured only in 1902. A voiturette, it featured C-spring rear suspension and a 1357 cc Bolide engine the car was unreliable and that led to the downfall.
