= Voiturette =

Miniature automobile

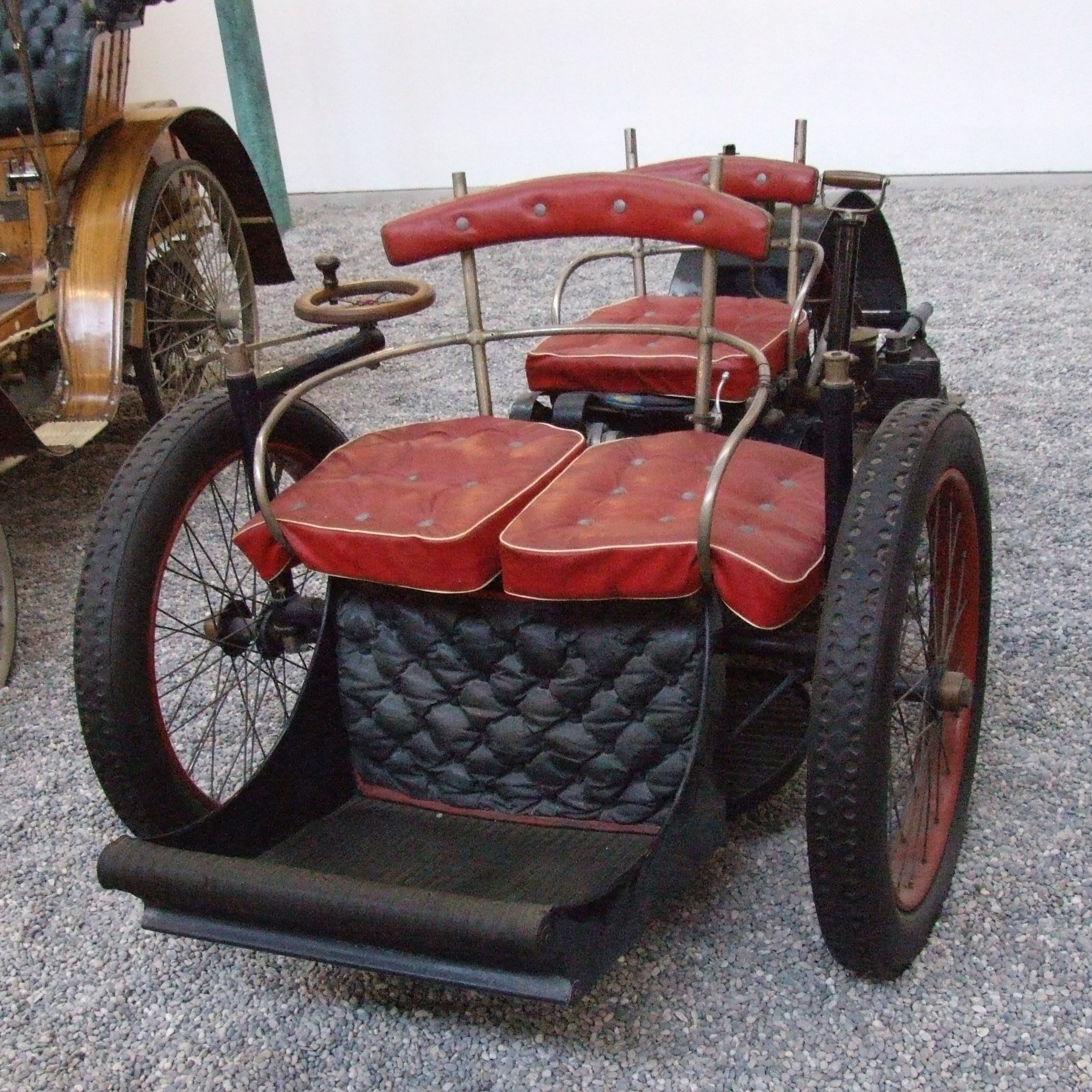
Léon Bollée's Voiturette, c. 1895

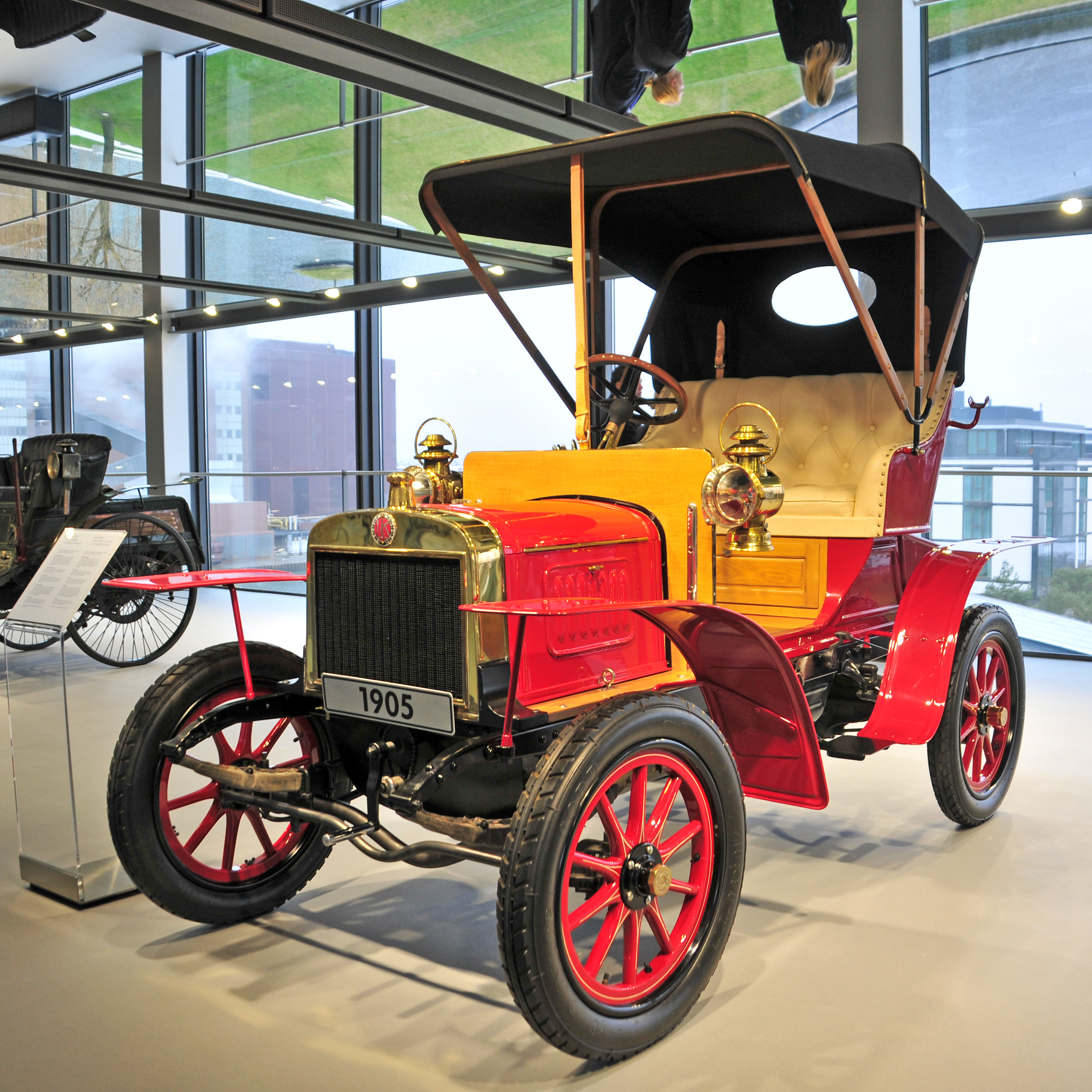
Laurin & Klement Voiturette, c. 1905

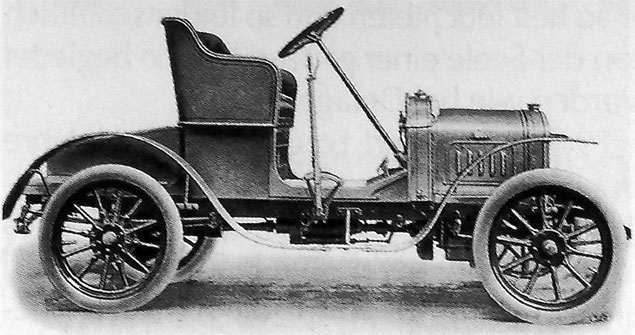
Delage Voiturette, c. 1906

A voiturette was a type of small car developed in Europe between the 1890s and 1910s. These were characterized by their light weight and very basic appearance compared to regular cars ("voitures"), with some being motorized tricycles. Many early automobile models in the 1890s and 1900s were named "Voiturette", and most fall under this classification. The cyclecar was a later development of the voiturette.

The term is still used in France to classify certain kinds of quadricycles, microcars, and small low-speed vehicles.

== History ==
Voiturette was first registered by Léon Bollée in 1895 to name his new motor tricycle. The term became so popular in the early years of the motor industry that it was used by many makers to describe their small cars. The word comes from the French word for "automobile", voiture. During the interwar period, lightweight racing cars with engines limited to 1500 cc such as the Alfa Romeo 158/159 Alfetta, the Bugatti Type 13 and the original ERAs were known as voiturettes.

In France, in the years after World War II, a type of small three-wheeled vehicle voiturette was produced.

In the 1990s, voiturette became a French classification for a vehicle weighing less than 350 kilograms (770 lb) empty and carrying a load (i.e. passengers) of not more than 200 kilograms (~440 lb). The top speed is limited to 46 km/h (~30 mph) and engine size to 50 cc or 4 kilowatts for an engine of "another type" for example an electric car.

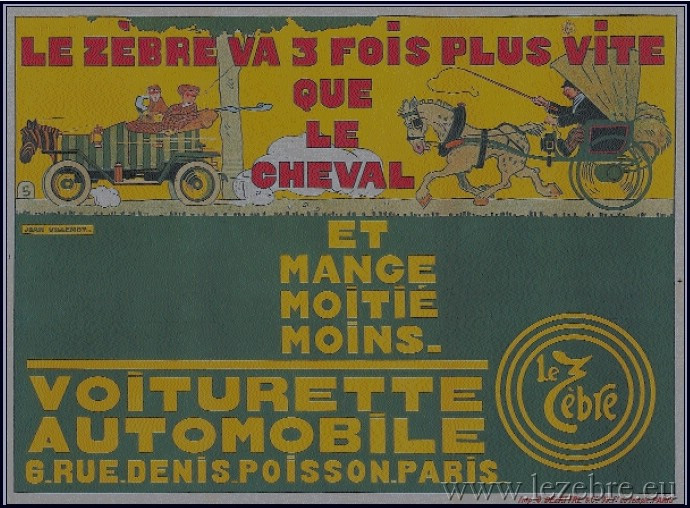
A French advertisement for voiturettes, comparing them to horse and carriage, c. 1912

Such vehicles are sometimes also called "motor quadricycles" or "motor tricycles". The driver's license for them is available to people over 16 years in the "B1" category and is valid, subject to restrictions, in all European Union countries.

== Renault's 1898 Voiturette ==
French automaker Renault's first car was simply called the Voiturette, instead of the common usage then (it would have been called Renault 1¾ CV). The 1900 model (Voiturette C) was considered the first ever sedan (a car with roof).

== Other automobiles so described ==
- Dalifol, manufactured in 1896 in France
- Dalifol & Thomas, manufactured from 1896 until 1898 in France
- Populaire, manufactured only in 1899 in France
- Esculapeus, manufactured in 1902 in England
- Damaizin & Pujos, manufactured in 1910 in France
- David & Bourgeois, manufactured in 1898 in France
- De Boisse, manufactured from 1901 until 1904 in France
- De Riancey, manufactured from 1898 until around 1901 in France
- Guerraz, manufactured in 1901 in France
- Guerry et Bourguignon, built in 1907 in France

== See also ==
- Antique car
