= Bathurst Decauville Tramway =

Former railway in Gambia

Coordinates: 13.45441°N 16.57299°W

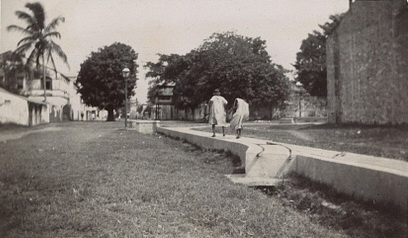
- Decauville tracks bedded in concrete along a drainage channel

Technical
- Line length: 1.9 km (1.2 mi)
- Track gauge: 600 mm (1 ft 11 5/8 in)
Route map
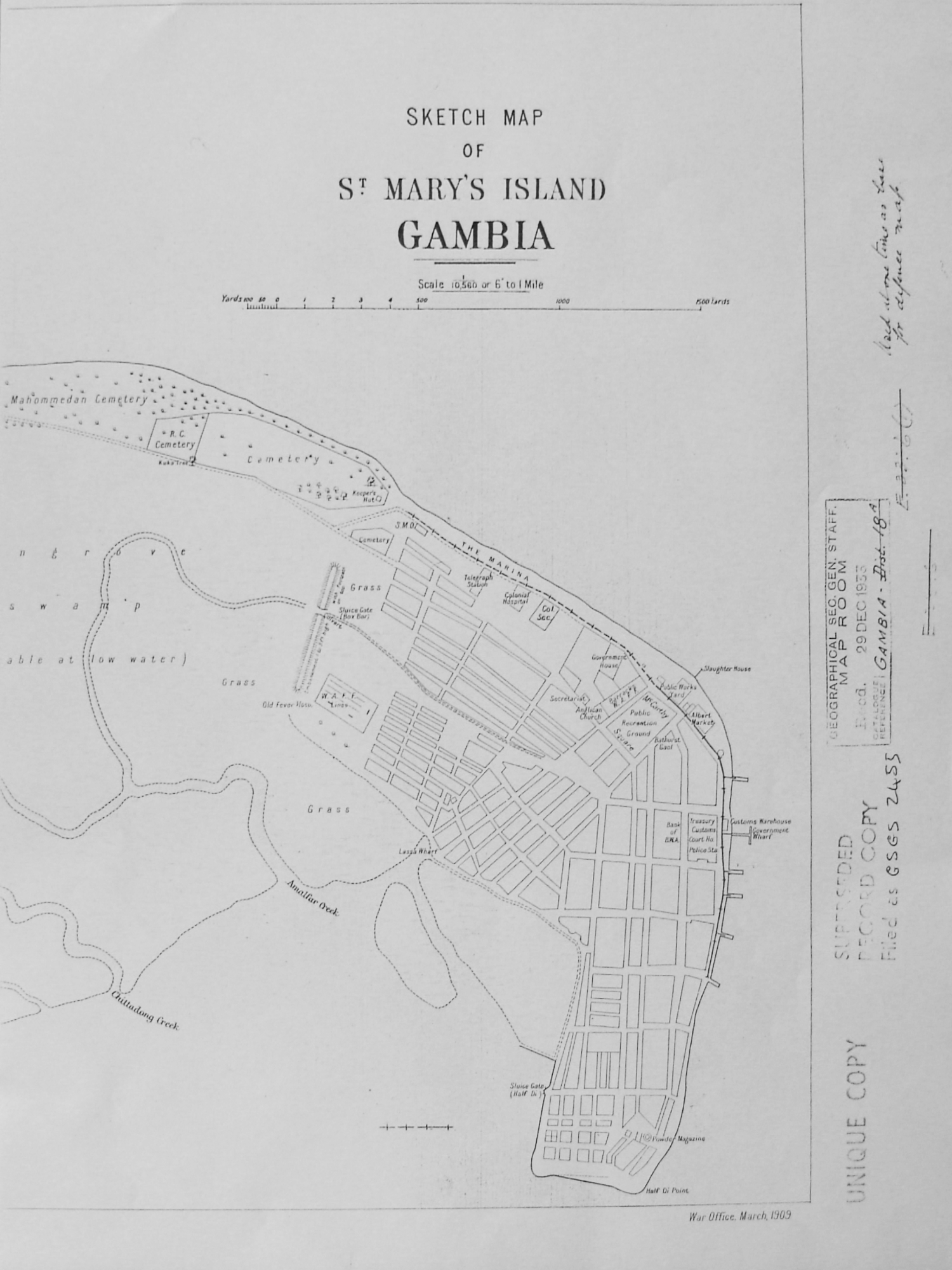
Sketch map of St Mary's Island, Gambia,
War Office, March 1909

The Bathurst Decauville Tramway was a 1.9 km (1.2 mi) long 600 mm (1 ft 11 5/8 in) gauge railway in Bathurst, British Gambia. It was hand-operated. It opened in 1907 and closed in the mid-1950s.

== History ==
The merchants of Bathurst wanted to install a Decauville tram system on the main streets of the city in collaboration with the colonial administration. The merchants wanted to transport goods faster and easier, and the colonial administration hoped to regulate the flow of traffic throughout the city by restricting it to officially approved tram lines.

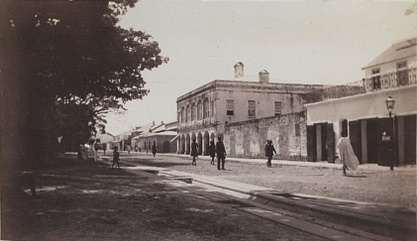
Wellington Street with a double track to the right and left of a canal

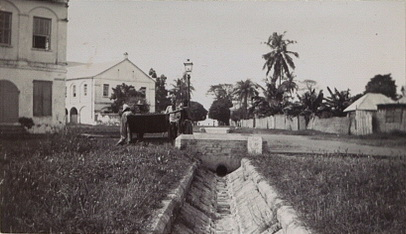
V skip wagon at the intersection of Blucher Street and Albion Square

The first tram tracks were laid in 1907 on Wellington Street, which ran along the coast and housed the department stores. The merchants and the colonial administration agreed in December 1907 to share the costs 50/50. In 1908, however, the merchants decided to withdraw from the partial financing of tram maintenance and proposed that the Colonial Administration pay for maintenance by taxing its use, which the Colonial Administration did by issuing the 1908 Tram Regulations.

Initially, it was estimated that £900 would be needed to lay the tracks and then £70 per year to maintain them, but after a year of laying the tracks the administration requested a further £1200. Without the capital that the merchants had originally promised it was not possible to raise enough money for the tram, so construction slowed down. In the absence of funds, the engineers tried to save costs by laying the rails on the road surface instead of placing them in concrete. In the long run, this exposed the rails to much greater wear and tear, but the Colonial Administration lacked the money that would have been needed to complete a track network embedded in concrete. The construction of the tramway was not possible because of the lack of funds.

When the first road trucks arrived in Bathurst in 1909, the reluctance of the merchants to support the tram financially increased. Although the tram was an improvement over the use of handcars and carrying goods on the head, it could not keep up with the speed and efficiency of the trucks.

In 1938, the tram was in a "deplorable state": the rails and sleepers were already broken in many places, but the Colonial Administration lacked the means to lay new, heavier tracks that could have handled the volume of transport.

On 11 June 1928, the acting director of public works wanted to abolish the tram lines and replace the Decauville wagons with trucks. The customs authorities, however, recognized that this would make their demand for transport duties impossible. It feared that without the tram lines, traders would drive their handcars in all directions, goods would escape customs clearance and the thefts would increase. Out of fear of such chaos, the Colonial Administration decided to maintain the tram lines and raise additional money by registering and inspecting the wagons. The tram system was operated until the mid-1950s, although the condition of the tracks had not improved.
