= Populaire (automobile) =

1899 French automobile

The Populaire was a French automobile manufactured only in 1899. A light rear-engined voiturette, it featured three-seater bodywork.

In 1903, the French manufacturer De Dion-Bouton also produced a range of Populaire models.
