= De Riancey =

French automobile

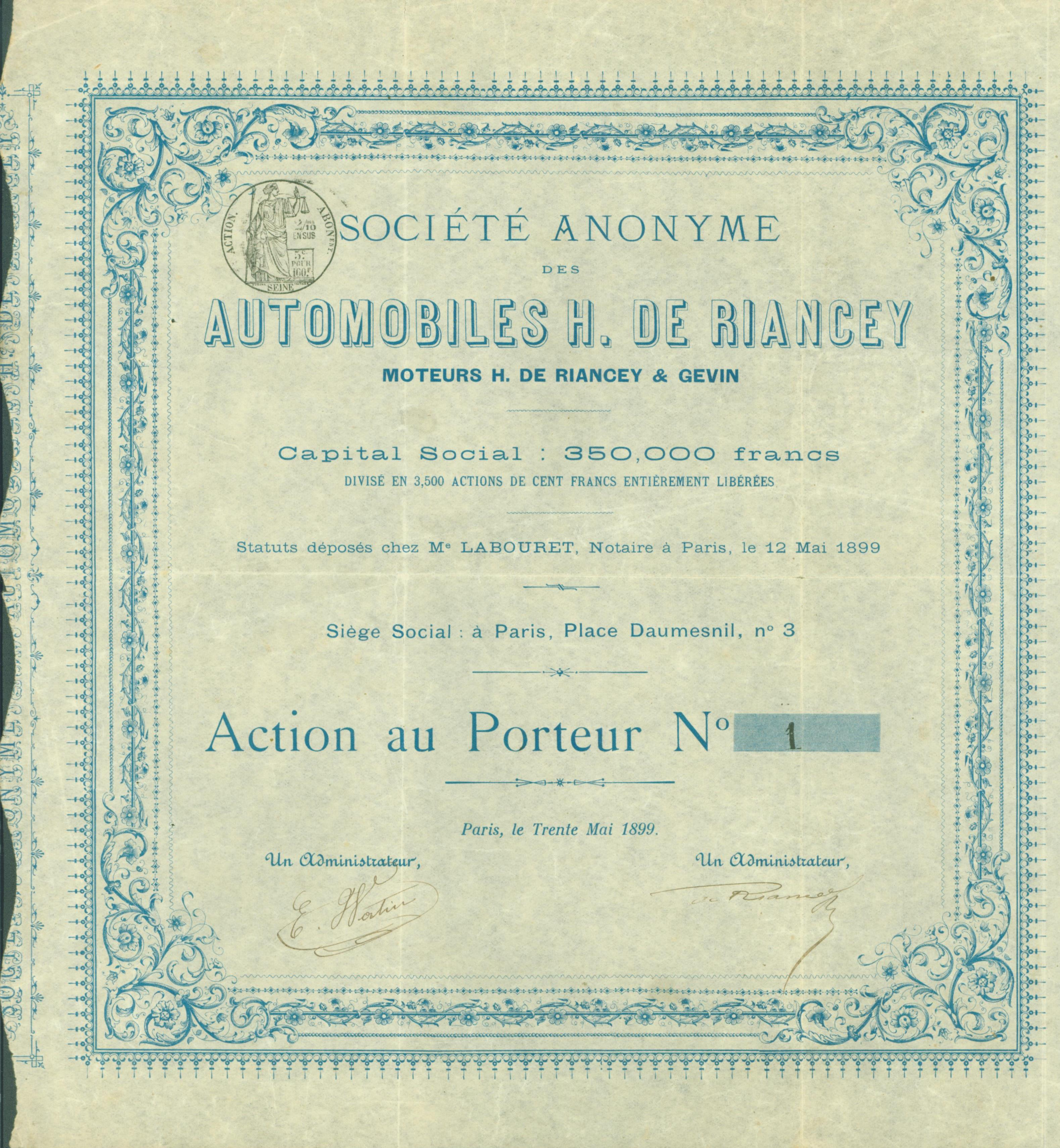
First share of the S. A. des Automobiles H. de Riancey, issued 30 May 1899

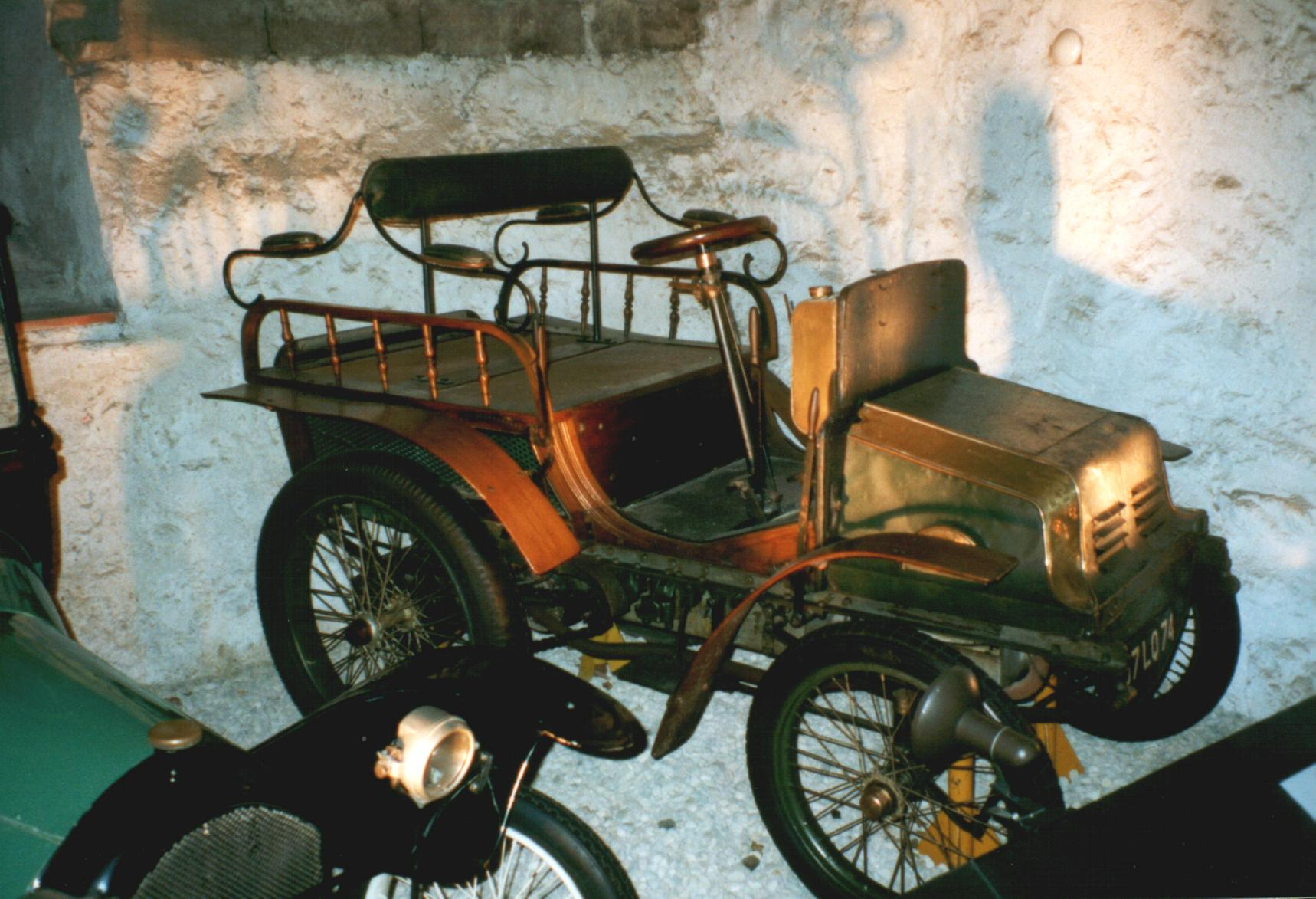
De Riancey, assembled 1899

The De Riancey was a French automobile manufactured from 1898 until around 1901. A front-wheel-drive voiturette, it used an air-cooled flat-twin engine.
