= Decauville Tramway at Exposition Universelle in Gent, 1913 =

Temporary narrow gauge railway at 1913 World Fair

Stockton & Ione Railroad
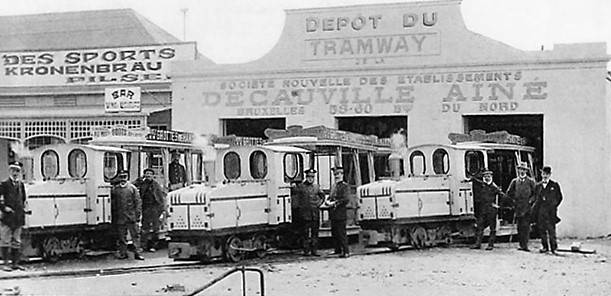
- "Depot du Tramway de la Societe Nouvelle des Etablissements Decauville Ainé, Bruxelles 58-60 B^{v} du Nord"

Technical
- Line length: 3 kilometres (1.9 mi)
- Track gauge: 600 mm (1 ft 11 5/8 in)

The Decauville Tramway at Exposition Universelle in Gent, 1913 (French Tramway de Decauville Ainé) was a temporary narrow gauge railroad with a gauge of 600 mm (1 ft 11 5/8 in), which was operated during the World Fair held in Ghent from 26 April to 3 November 1913.

== History ==
After the success of the Decauville railway at Exposition Universelle (1889) in Paris, the Belgian subsidiary of the French company Decauville in Corbeil-Essonnes exhibited their products also at the Exposition universelle et internationale (1913).

== Route ==
The route passed amongst others the following stations:

- Palais de Beaux Arts
- Ville de Paris
- Delhaize Freres & Cie ‹Le Leon›
- Modern Village
- Rue Belvedere
- Chateau d’eau

The Depot was between the Modernen Village and the sport fields.

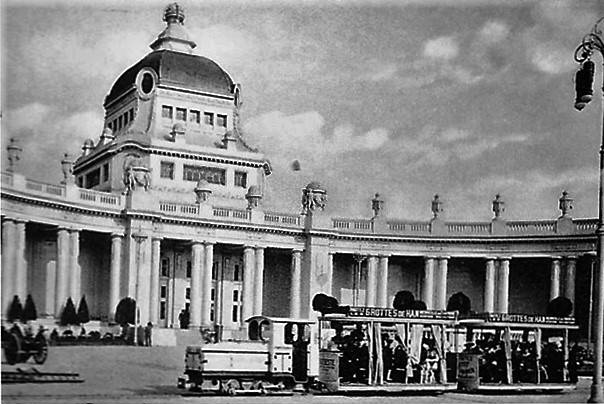
Palais de Beaux Arts

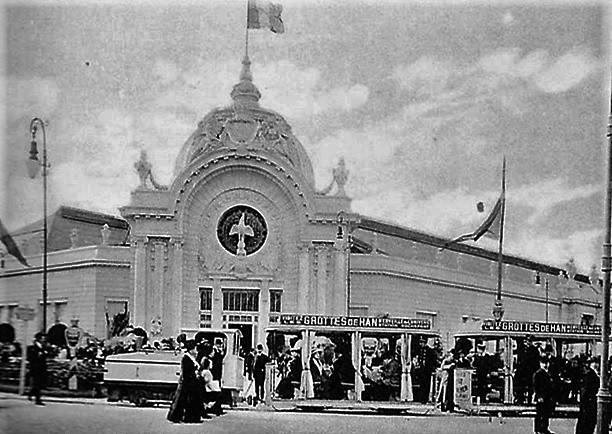
Ville de Paris

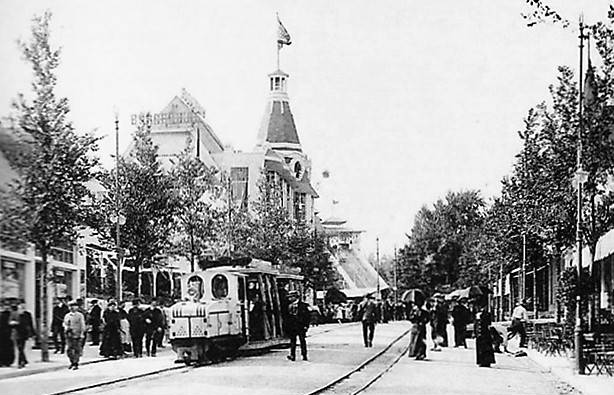
Rue Belvedere

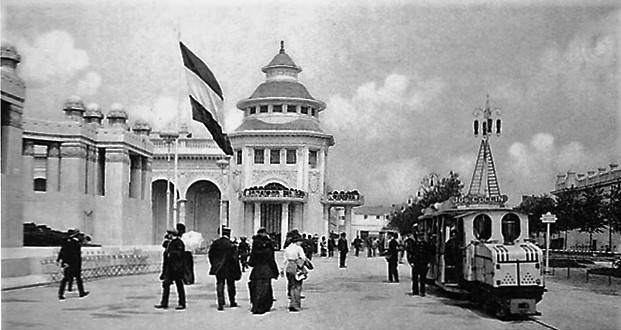
Chateau d'eau

== Operation ==
Eight Montania locomotives of the Paris branch of Orenstein & Koppel and Arthur Koppel were used on the temporarily laid line. They could be operated with benzene, petrol, alcohol or petroleum. On the side of the engine cover they had a discreet lettering of the company 'Decauville', which was responsible for the distribution of this locomotive in Belgium.

The operation was carried out by a 24-strong team of 10 locomotive drivers, 12 uniformed conductors, a railway attendant dressed in white and the train dispatcher.

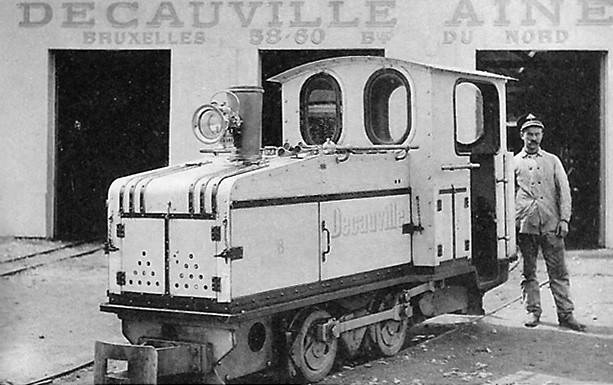
Locomotive

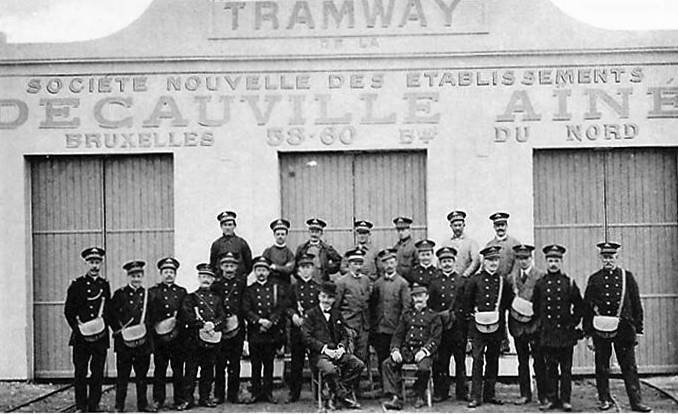
Engine drivers and conductors

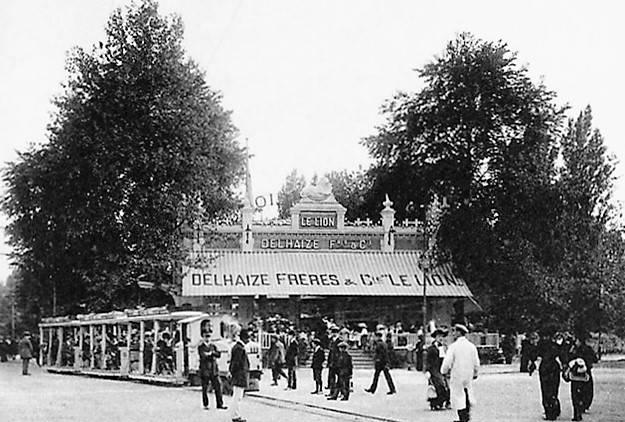
Railway attendant

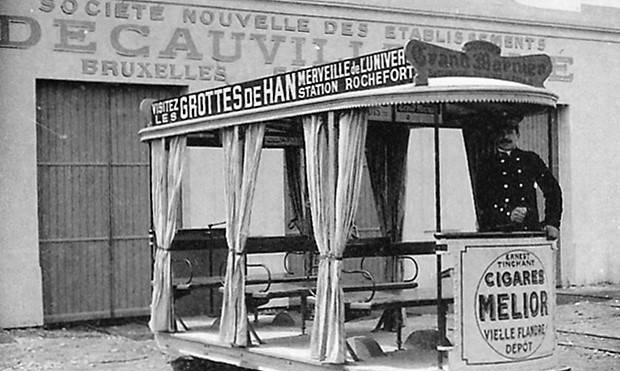
Tramcar
