= Benjamin Constant railway =

Railway line in Brazil

Coordinates: 1.06188°S 46.75438°W

Sapucaia – Benjamin Constant
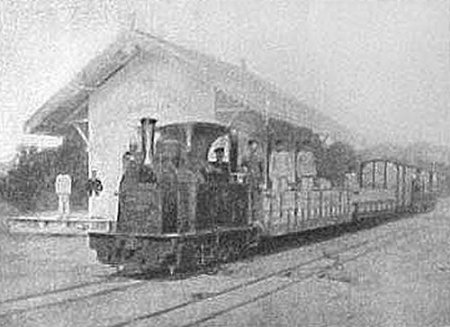
- Sapucaia railway station at the harbour of Sapucaia

Technical
- Line length: 17.658 km (10.972 mi)
- Track gauge: 600 mm (1 ft 11 5/8 in)
- Minimum radius: 102 m (335 ft)
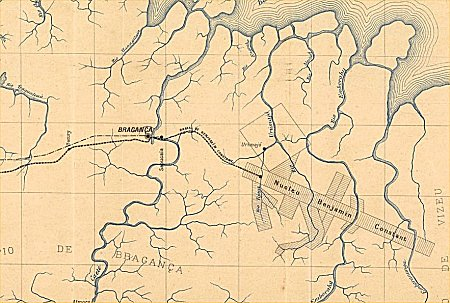

The Benjamin Constant railway (Portuguese Ramal de Benjamin Constant) was a 17.658 km (10.972 mi) long 600 mm (1 ft 11 5/8 in) gauge Decauville railway in Brazil. It connected the Colônia Agrícola Benjamin Constant from 1904 to 1964 with the riverboat port of Sapucaia on the Rio Caeté opposite Bragança in the state of Pará.

== History ==
The governor of the Brazilian state of Pará decided, to build a Decauville railway between the Colônia Agrícola Benjamin Constant, named after the republic's founder Benjamin Constant Botelho de Magalhães, and the city of Bragança. He signed on 27 April 1900 a contract with the civil engineer Guilherme von Linde, who could, however, not fulfill his obligations, although the completion date was twice postponed until 27 April 1903.

Therefore, his successor, Governor Augusto Montenegro, commissioned engineer Dr. Ing. Amynthas de Lemos to prepare a report on the state of work. He was able to ascertain without much difficulty that the instructions had not been followed because no plans or sections of the track, bridges, stations, culverts or the work specified in the contract could be found.

Even in the section, where the rails had been laid, the execution had only a provisional character: the railway embankments were made from material that had been dug-out alongside the embankment ditches, so that the drainage was obstructed, which led to water accumulation and endangered the strength of the railway embankments. Only in a few cuttings the sides were beveled, but the excavated material had been piled up along the crest line.

Two of the culverts, one with drywall and the other one measuring 0.6 m × 0.7 m × 11.15 m (1 ft 11 5/8 in × 2 ft 3 1/2 in × 36 ft 7 in), were unsafe. In the latter, iron sleepers were used for the retaining walls. The two open culverts had also a very temporary character. The rails were laid without ballast, contrary to the contract, according to which the ballast bed should have been 0.2 metres (7.9 in) high. The sleepers were very far apart, in some cases up to 1 m (3 ft 3 3/8 in), severely affecting the stability of the track and causing many rails to twist and twist. Despite the contracted use of hardwood sleepers, there were very few of these, and these were of the worst quality.

The track had been laid without proper surveying or leveling, occasionally there were counter-curves without intermediate straight sections. The arches had very small radii and there were no even stretches between decline and incline. In addition, it would have been impossible to lay more track, even if the government had done so itself, as the barque Agnes had been stranded and abandoned with all building materials at Sapucaia, before it could be unloaded, as agreed with the insurance company.

The contract was therefore terminated, and Governor Montenegro duly authorized the engineer Lemos on behalf of the colonial administration to continue the construction work. The work was completed and the track was ready for commissioning by 7 September 1904.

== Location ==
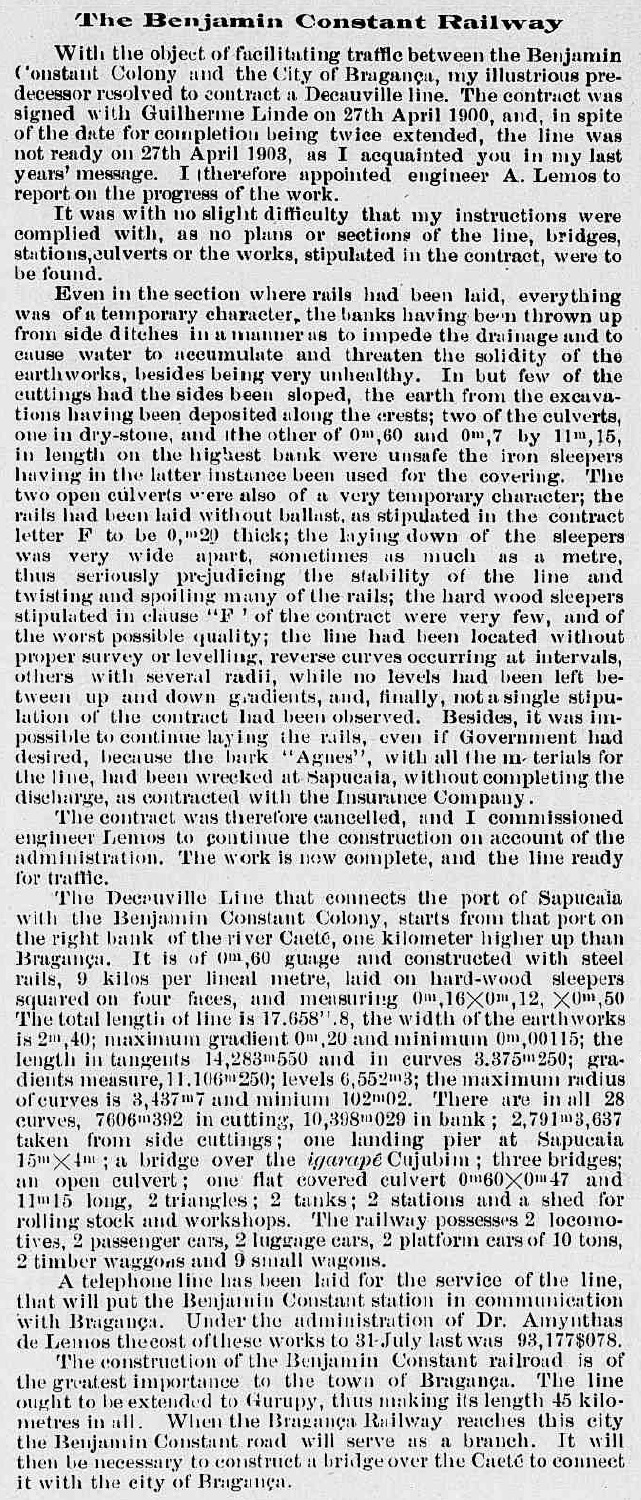
Governor Montenegro's report to the Members of the Legislative Congress on 7th September 1904

The Decauville railway, which connected the port of Sapucaia with the Benjamin Constant Colony, began at the port of Sapucaia. It followed the right-hand bank of the Caeté River, 1 kilometre (0.62 mi) above Bragança. It had a gauge of 600 mm (1 ft 11 5/8 in) and was made with steel rails, which had a weight of 9 kg/m (18 lbs/yd). They were laid on wooden sleepers that were rectangularly flattened on all four sides. The track was a total of 17,658 metres (10.972 mi) long, of which 14,283 metres (8.875 mi) were straight 3,375 metres (2.097 mi) were curved. The maximum radius of the curves was 3,437 metres (3,759 yd) and the minimum radius 102 metres (112 yd). There were a total of 28 arches, 7,606 m of track ran in incisions and 10,398 m on embankments. The jetty in Sapucaia was 15 × 4 m. There was a bridge over the Igarapé Cujubim^{(sv)} as well as three more bridges, an open culvert with the dimensions of 0.60 × 0.47 × 11.15 m, two wyes, two water tanks, two stations and one shed for rail vehicles and workshops.

For the operation of the route a telephone line had been laid, which connected the station Benjamin Constant with that in Bragança. For the work under the direction of Dr. Aniynthas de Lemos by 31 July 1903 costs of R$ 93,177 incurred.

== Rolling stock ==
The railway had initially 2 locomotives, 2 passenger cars, 2 baggage cars, 2 platform wagons with 10 tons each, 9 small freight cars and 2 timber wagons.

The first steam locomotive was delivered in 1902. The second locomotive arrived in 1903 disassembled in individual parts and was assembled on site. The third was commissioned in 1906.

== Further plans ==
The construction of the Benjamin Constant Railway was very important to the city of Bragança. It was planned to extend the track to Gurupy so that it would have been a total of 45 kilometers long. After completion of the meterspurigen Bragança train it should be operated as a branch line. It was planned to build a bridge over the Rio Caete to connect with the city of Bragança.

== Operator change and extension ==
The Estrada de Ferro de Bragança took over in 1908 the management of the branch line to Benjamin Constant and their train drivers. The narrow gauge line was extended in 1908 to a length of 26 and 29 kilometres (16 and 18 mi).

== Decommissioning ==
The Decauville railway and its terminus, which has been called Tijoca since the 1950s, was officially shut down on 27 May 1964 by the RFFSA.
