= Dalifol & Thomas =

The Dalifoil & Thomas was a French automobile manufactured from 1896 until 1898. A voiturette built in the Dulac factory in Montreuil-sous-Bois, it was powered by two separate De Dion engines. In 1899 the company introduced a motor tricycle with a "Dust proof" two-speed constant-mesh gearbox.

== See also ==
- Dalifol, manufactured in 1896.
