= Dalifol =

Former french company

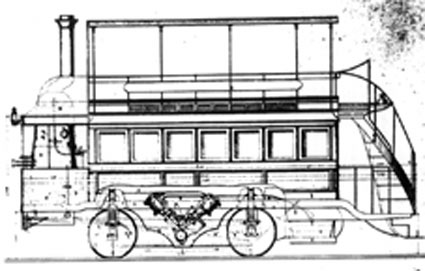
1876 steam tram manufactured by Dalifol with V-twin engines similar to Amédée Bollée's L'Obéissante

The Dalifol was a French automobile manufactured only in 1896. It was a horizontal-engined gas-driven car built by a firm best known for producing steam motorcycles.

== See also ==
- Dalifol & Thomas, manufactured from 1896 until 1898
