= Dowty Propellers =

Company in aviation components

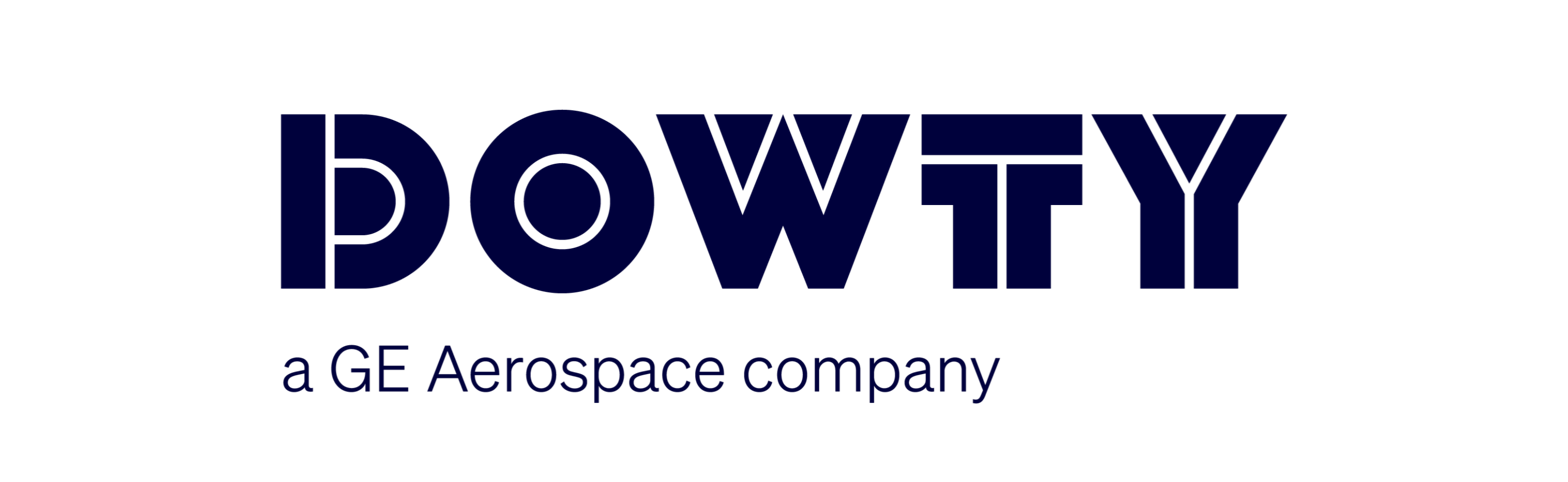
- Type: Subsidiary
- Industry: Aerospace
- Founded: 1937; 89 years ago as Rotol Airscrews
- Founders: Rolls-Royce Limited; Bristol Aeroplane Company
- Headquarters: Brockworth, Gloucestershire, United Kingdom
- Parent: GE Aerospace
- Website: dowty.com

Dowty Propellers is a British engineering company based in Brockworth, Gloucestershire that specialises in the manufacture, repair and overhaul of propellers and propeller components for customers around the world. It is owned by GE Aerospace.

== History ==
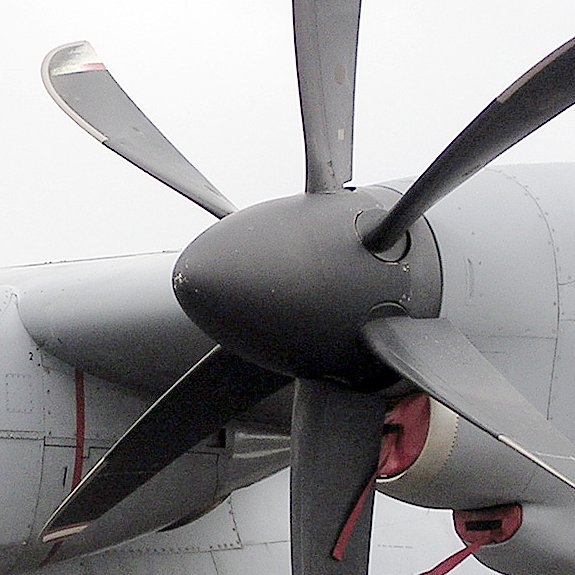
One of four 6-bladed Dowty Rotol R391 composite controllable- and reversible-pitch propellers on the Lockheed Martin C-130J Super Hercules

The company was formed as Rotol Airscrews in 1937 by Rolls-Royce and Bristol Engines to take over both companies' propeller development, the market being too small to support more than one company. The name is a contraction of "Rolls-Royce" and "Bristol". Rotol's propellers were always considered leading edge, its models equipping the Hawker Hurricane, Supermarine Spitfire, and many other Second World War-era aircraft. By the end of the war it had introduced the first five-bladed propeller to see widespread use, used on late-model Spitfires. In 1943 the company changed its name from Rotol Airscrews Limited to Rotol Limited, and in 1952 it acquired British Messier Limited, a specialist in landing gear and hydraulics.

In 1958, Bristol Aeroplane and Rolls-Royce agreed to sell Rotol and British Messier to the Dowty Group. By 1959 Rotol and British Messier along with Dowty Equipment and Dowty Fuel Systems became part of the new Dowty Aviation Division based at Cheltenham.

In 1968, the company introduced the first fibreglass propellers, which went on to see widespread use. Since then it has migrated to carbon fibre, and remains a leader in propeller design.

In 1992, Dowty Group was bought by TI Group and in 1994 following a series of restructurings, the company was split into a number of business units. The original Dowty Rotol facility at Staverton focused on the production of landing gear and was initially placed into a joint venture with SNECMA being fully absorbed into Safran as part of what is now the Safran Landing Systems business (formerly Messier-Bugatti-Dowty). The propeller design and manufacture was meanwhile moved a few hundred metres down the road and remained within the TI Group as Dowty Propellers.

In 2000, Dowty Propeller's ownership changed once again as Smiths Industries merged with TI Group to form Smiths Group plc.

On 16 January 2007, Dowty Propellers became part of GE Aviation Systems through GE buying Smiths Group’s aerospace division.

On 5 February 2015, a fire at Dowty's Staverton facility caused severe damage to 80% of the factory building, destroying the main production line. A facility at Vantage Point Business Village in Mitcheldean, Gloucestershire, was selected for the company's interim propeller blade manufacturing. In late 2019, the company began moving its operations to an all-new purpose-built facility at Gloucester Business Park in Brockworth, on part of the site of the former aerodrome used by the Gloster Aircraft Company.

== Operations ==
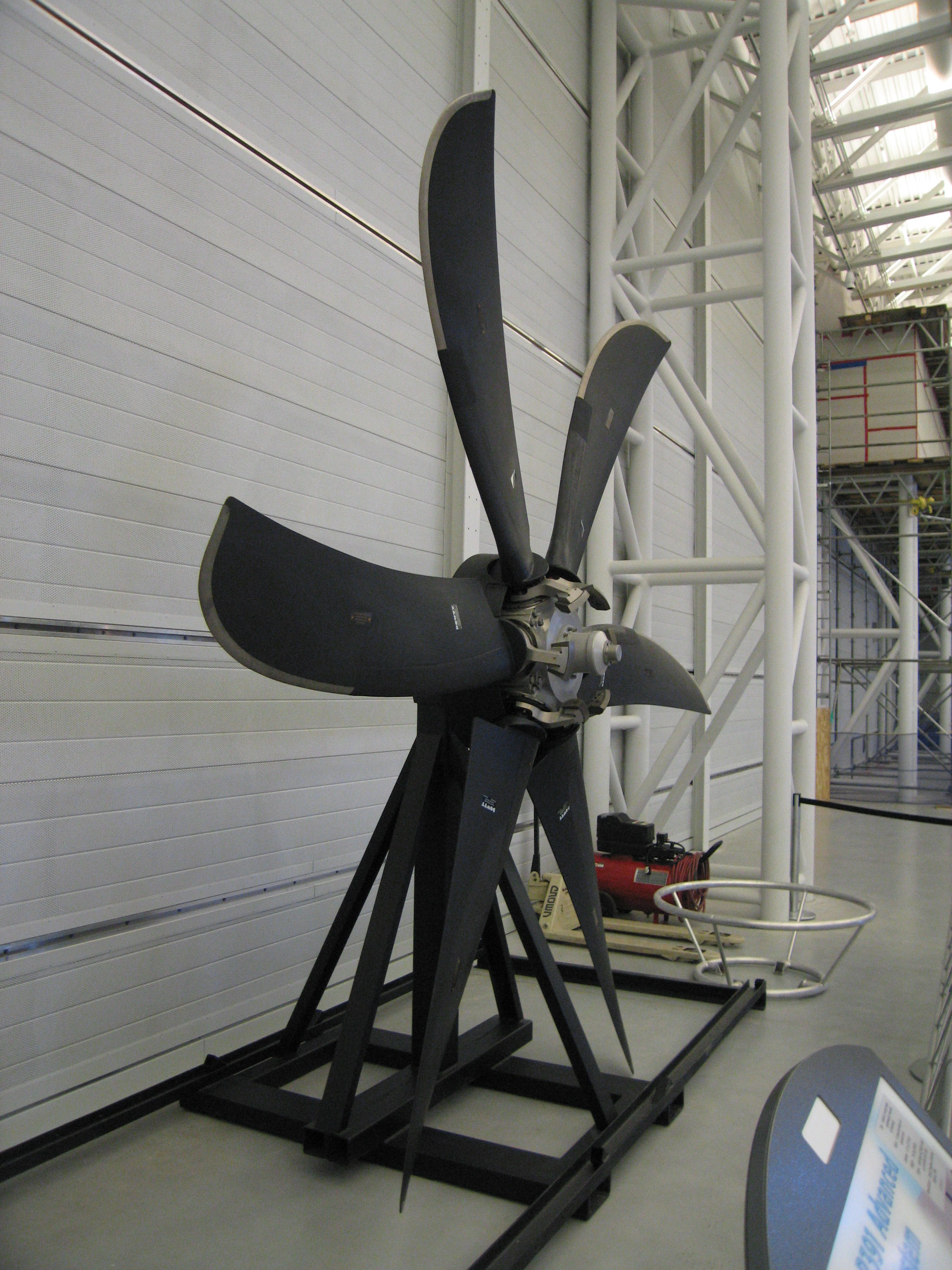
Dowty R391 Propeller on display at Steven F. Udvar-Hazy Center

Dowty propellers are used on many turboprop feederliners, including the Bombardier Dash 8 Q400, Saab 340 and Saab 2000, and on turboprop transport aircraft such as later models of the C-130J and Alenia C-27J. Dowty propellers can also be found on LCACs used by the militaries of several countries. The US National Air and Space Museum's Udvar Hazy Center, Virginia, has a Dowty propeller on display.

== See also ==
- Messier-Dowty
- George Dowty
- List of aircraft propeller manufacturers
