= Hercules Cycle and Motor Company =

Former British bicycle manufacturer

Hercules Cycle and Motor Company Limited
- Industry: Bicycles - at one time, the largest manufacturer of bicycles in the world
- Founded: 10 September 1910 in Birmingham, England
- Founders: Edmund Crane; Harry Crane
- Defunct: 3 December 2003
- Fate: Dissolved by parent company
- Headquarters: Birmingham, United Kingdom
- Parent: Tube Investments

The Hercules Cycle and Motor Company Limited was a British bicycle manufacturer founded on 9 September 1910 in Aston in England.

The name Hercules was chosen for its associations of durability and robustness. The company was founded by Edmund and Harry Crane and started life in Coventry Street, Birmingham, England, initially producing 25 bicycles a week. Sir Edmund Crane was chairman of the Birmingham and District Football League between 1934 and 1939.

== History ==
Crane's parents bought the Petros Cycle Company which was subsequently managed by Edmund's mother, Edith. Their children, Harry and Ted, left school at 14 and helped their parents with the business. In 1906, Jack Crane was declared bankrupt and the family moved to Lightwoods Hill, where they sold bikes at auctions. The bankruptcy finding meant they were bought in the mother's name and sold to the sons even though she had also been made bankrupt.

In 1911, Harry and Ted rented a derelict house in Coventry Street, using a name they had already registered in 1910, the Hercules Cycle and Motor Company. Harry assembled bicycles while Ted cycled around Birmingham for parts. Ted had problems selling because of fierce competition but soon made progress, trading on low price and high quality. Production outgrew the site and bikes were packed on the pavement. The brothers went from 25 to 70 bicycles a week within six months. They moved to a house with a yard in Conybere Street. It had 10 workers. Within a few months, production had doubled and the company moved to larger premises in Conybere Street, Highgate.

=== Growth ===
In 1923, a third move was made to an ex-Dunlop factory in Rocky Lane, Aston. This became Hercules's Britannia Works and grew to 13 acres (53,000 m^{2}). It was the site of the company's offices. By 1914 production rose to 10,000 a year. The First World War brought an order to make shells.

In 1928, Hercules exported one in five of all British cycles and, by 1935, 40 per cent. In 1929, it took over the Dunlop factory in Nechells, less than a mile to the north-west in Long Acre. This site was named Manor Mills. The company made its six millionth bicycle in February 1939.

During this period, Birmingham had been home to a large number of cycle manufacturers, most of which did not prosper. The success of Hercules was attributed to a number of factors, including the name and production methods. After 1923, Hercules produced the majority of the components of their bicycles, apart from the inner tubes and tyres. Factories ran using mass-production, producing more than 1,000 cycles a day, each taking less than 10 minutes to assemble.

Ted Crane would not employ union members. He paid 10 per cent better than the union rate, although he sacked workers who could not produce 15 per cent more than unionised workers.

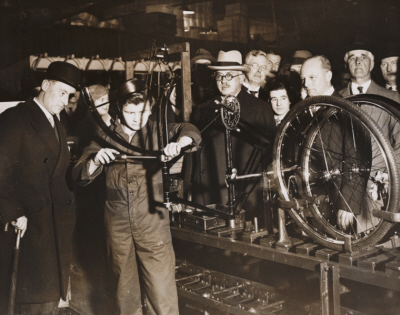
Sir M Campbell watches finishing touches to 3 millionth Hercules bicycle

Hercules exported a significant percentage of production – by the time Sir Malcolm Campbell was invited to see the three millionth bicycle in 1933, over half the production had been sent overseas, earning £6 million and letters of congratulation from the King and Prince of Wales.

Production continued and by the end of the thirties, Hercules had produced more than six million bicycles, and could claim to be the biggest manufacturer of cycles in the world.

A third factory was added in the 1950s in Plume Street, Long Acre, a short distance from Manor Mills. By this time, Hercules had become one of the largest businesses in Aston, and helped give the area its character. To this day, the mascot of Aston Villa football club is Hercules the Lion.

In 1946, Crane sold the company to Tube Investments for three and a quarter million pounds criticising his accountant who he said had "given away the company". He stayed on the board of the company. TI had been the main supplier to Hercules, providing the tubing from which the bicycle frames were made. By then, Hercules had lost its understanding of the market. Its racing bike had steel handlebars when alloy was the fashion. It had five gears when 10 were normal. It had heavy tubing and not Reynolds 531. The last bicycles with the Hercules name were produced by Raleigh factory in Nottingham. The name was allowed to die, although Hercules registered accounts until the end of 2001 and the company was not wound up until 2 December 2003. By then it was registered at Raleigh's address in Triumph Road, Nottingham.

Tube Investments combined the company with Norman, Phillips, and Sun to form the British Cycle Corporation in 1956. Hercules adopted the slogan 'Wonder Wheels'.

=== Sponsorship ===
In 1952 Eileen Sheridan became involved with Hercules. She broke records for Hercules between 1952 and 1954.

It was also at this time leading cyclist Derek Buttle approached Hercules about forming a racing team. In 1953, the company agreed, and became one of the first British bicycle manufacturers to run a professional road race team. The team raced on the Continent for a couple of years and disbanded in 1955. Sheridan, other time-trial professionals such as Ken Joy, and the road race team, were managed by a member of Hercules' sales staff, racing cyclist Frank Southall. He had held many records and rode for Britain in the Olympic Games. He also rode for Hercules as a professional.

=== Consolidation and decline ===
The British cycle industry suffered a downturn from this time, and Hercules was affected due to its reliance on exports – new tariffs were instituted in the US, and the Empire started to purchase bicycles produced in Africa and Asia. A 1955 attempt to diversify into moped production was largely unsuccessful. In 1956 Tube Investments made 1,250 employees of the British Cycle Corporation redundant, following deadlock with unions over changed working practices. Many of the workers were from Hercules factories.

As a result, Tube Investments bought the Nottingham-based Raleigh Cycle Company in 1960 to form TI Raleigh Industries. Combined, they controlled 75% of the British bicycle market. Management of the British Cycle Corporation was handed to the Raleigh management, as that company with its greater domestic focus, was larger and better known. Raleigh quickly decided to cut the number of brands, and move to using Raleigh designs and standards. Production was concentrated in Nottingham in 1960, and by 1963 there was little left of a distinctive Hercules.

The original company – still part of Raleigh – was dissolved on 2 December 2003. The company archives are at the National Cycle Archive.

The brand lives on as part of TI Cycles of India.

=== Hercules Trade Bike ===
Here is an example of a Hercules trade bike

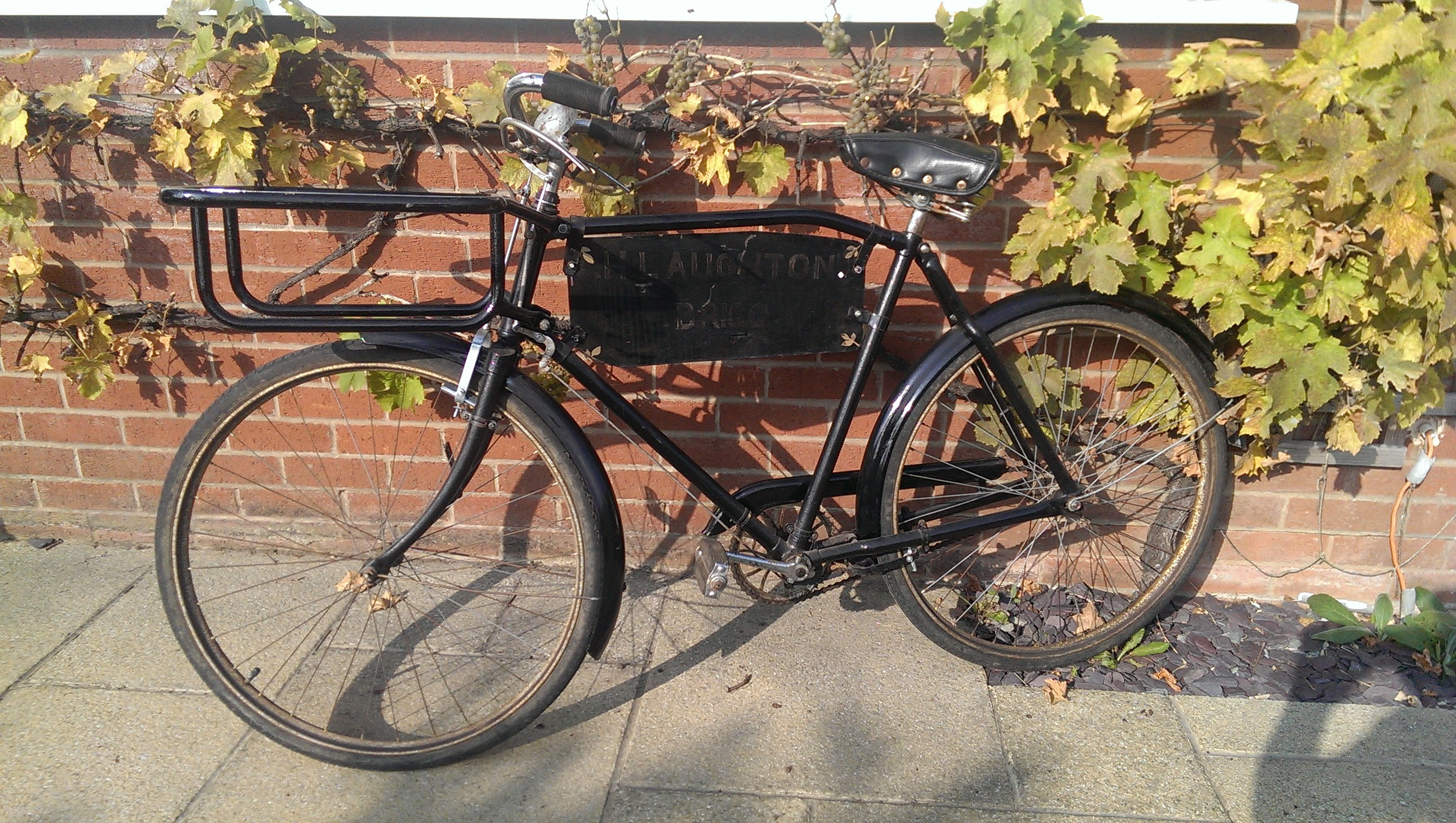
Hercules trade bike.

== See also ==
- List of bicycle manufacturing companies
