= 1913 Isle of Man TT =

Motorcycle race

Isle of Man Tourist Trophy
- Date: June 4 and 6, 1913
- Location: Douglas, Isle of Man
- Course: Snaefell Mountain Course; 37.5 mi (60.39 km)
- Organiser: Auto-Cycle Union
- Clerk

Junior TT
- First: Hugh Mason, NUT-JAP
- Second: Billy Newsome, Douglas
- Third: Howard Newman, Ivy-Precision

Fastest lap
- Hugh Mason; 49min. 32sec. 45.42 mph New record

Senior TT
- First: Tim Wood, Scott
- Second: Ray Abbott, Rudge
- Third: Alfred Alexander, Indian

Fastest lap
- Tim Wood; 43min. 10sec. 52.12 mph New record

The 1913 Isle of Man Tourist Trophy races were increased in length to a six lap (226 mile) Junior race and to seven laps (262.5 mile) for the Senior race. The highest number of entries to date, one hundred and forty seven, were received for these races.

The 350cc Junior TT was won by H.Mason 2¾ hp NUT-Jap motor-cycle and the 500cc Senior TT Race by Tim Wood with a chain-driven 3½ hp Scott machine.

While leading the Senior TT race, Frank Bateman, riding a Rudge crashed fatally on the fourth lap below the Shephard's Hut near to Keppel Gate.

Continental entries for the Senior TT race included E. Vailati (3½ hp Rudge) from Italy, K. Gassert (3½ hp NSU) from Germany and a Russian entrant M Kremleff also riding a Rudge, but he retired after crashing.

== Junior TT final standings ==
Wednesday 4 & Friday 6 June 1913 – 6 laps (225 miles) Isle of Man TT Mountain Course

| Rank | No | Rider | Team | Speed | Time |
|---|---|---|---|---|---|
| 1 | 12 | (United Kingdom) H. Mason | 2¾ hp NUT-Jap | 43.73 mph | 5:08.34.0 |
| 2 | 3 | (United Kingdom) W.F. Newsome | 2¾ hp Douglas | 43.64 mph | 5:09.20.0 |
| 3 | 27 | (United Kingdom) H.C. Newman | 2¾ hp Ivy-Precision | 41.79 mph | 3:46.59 |
| 4 | 17 | (United Kingdom) D.R. O'Donovan | 2¾ hp NSU | 40.55 mph | 5:32.56.0 |
| 5 | 43 | (United Kingdom) F.G. Ball | 2¾ hp Douglas | 39.77 mph | 5:39.22.0 |
| 6 | 40 | (United Kingdom) S. Wright | 2¾ hp Humber | 39.71 mph | 5:39.52.0 |
| 7 | 34 | (United Kingdom) R.J. Bell | 2¾ hp NSU | 38.58 mph | 5:49.56.0 |
| 8 | | (United Kingdom) R. Ellis | 2¾ hp NUT-Jap | 37.29 mph | 6:02.04.0 |
| 9 | 24 | (United Kingdom) J. Haslam | 2¾ hp Douglas | 37.29 mph | 6:02.05.0 |
| 10 | 42 | (United Kingdom) W. Heaton | 2¾ hp AJS | 37.29 mph | 6:02.05.0 |
| 11 | 25 | (United Kingdom) A. Bashall | 2¾ hp Douglas | 37.18 mph | 6:03.05.0 |
| 12 | 39 | (United Kingdom) Tom Knowles | 2¾ hp Humber | 36.68 mph | 6:07.58.0 |
| 13 | 44 | (United Kingdom) A. Butterfield | 2¾ hp Levis | 36.52 mph | 6:09.41.0 |
| 14 | 28 | (United Kingdom) G.L. Fletcher | 2¾ hp Douglas | 36.17 mph | 6:13.13.0 |
| 15 | 7 | (United Kingdom) H. Martin | 2¾ hp Martin | 35.92 mph | 6:15.48.0 |
| 16 | 22 | (United Kingdom) C.M. Down | 2¾ hp Enfield | 35.73 mph | 6:17.52.0 |
| 17 | 37 | (United Kingdom) H. Greaves | 2¾ hp Enfield | 35.69 mph | 6:18.11.0 |
| 18 | 26 | (United Kingdom) J. Stewart | 2¾ hp Douglas | 34.67 mph | 6:29.23.0 |
| 19 | 9 | (United Kingdom) D.R. Clarke | 2¾ hp Douglas | 34.63 mph | 6:29.49.0 |
| 20 | 18 | (United Kingdom) K.H. Clark | 2¾ hp Corah | 34.55 mph | 6:30.43.0 |
| 21 | 30 | (United Kingdom) W.M. Moore | 2¾ hp Humber | 34.55 mph | 6:36.05.0 |
| 22 | 33 | (United Kingdom) C.G. Pullin | 2¾ hp Velocette | 33.27 mph | 6:45.42.0 |

Fastest Lap: H.Mason – 45.42 mph (49’ 32.0) on lap 6.

== Senior TT 500cc Race final standings ==
Wednesday 4 & Friday 6 June 1913 – 7 laps (262.50 miles) Isle of Man TT Mountain Course

| Rank | No | Rider | Team | Speed | Time |
|---|---|---|---|---|---|
| 1 | 124 | (United Kingdom) H.O. Wood | 3 ½ hp Scott | 48.69 mph | 5:26.18.0 |
| 2 | 62 | (United Kingdom) A.R. Abbott | 3 ½ hp Rudge | 48.27 mph | 5:26.23.0 |
| 3 | 88 | (United Kingdom) A.H. Alexander | 3 ½ hp Indian | 47.67 mph | 5:30.11.0 |
| 4 | 129 | (United Kingdom) C.B. Franklin | 3 ½ hp Indian | 47.43 mph | 5:32.04.0 |
| 5 | 61 | (United Kingdom) J. Cocker | 3 ½ hp Singer | 47.41 mph | 5:32.13.0 |
| 6 | 106 | (Isle of Man) T.M. Sheard | 3 ½ hp Rudge | 46.00 mph | 5:42.27.0 |
| 7 | 100 | (United Kingdom) F.L. Moxey | 3 ½ hp Zenith | 45.56 mph | 5:45.42.0 |
| 8 | 83 | (United Kingdom) S.F. Garrett | 3 ½ hp Regal-Green | 44.90 mph | 5:50.49.0 |
| 9 | 133 | (United Kingdom) V.Busby | 3 ½ hp Ariel | 44.50 mph | 5:53.53.51 |
| 10 | 58 | (United Kingdom) N.H. Brown | 3 ½ hp Indian | 44.12 mph | 5:56.57.0 |
| 11 | 109 | (United Kingdom) S.T. Tessier | 3 ½ hp BAT | 43.83 mph | 5:59.18.0 |
| 12 | 128 | (United Kingdom) F.C. North | 3 ½ hp Ariel | 43.77 mph | 5:59.48.0 |
| 13 | 116 | (United Kingdom) J.W. Adamson | 3 ½ hp Triumph | 43.73 mph | 6:0.13.0 |
| 14 | 144 | (United Kingdom) S. George | 3 ½ hp Indian | 43.23 mph | 6:04.21.0 |
| 15 | 143 | (Isle of Man) D.M. Brown | 3 ½ hp Rover | 43.16 mph | 6:04.28.0 |
| 16 | 153 | (United Kingdom) J.F. Sirrette | 3 ½ hp Indian | 42.82 mph | 6:07.49.0 |
| 17 | 150 | (United Kingdom) R. Carey | 3 ½ hp B.S.A. | 41.89 mph | 6:16.03.0 |
| 18 | 127 | (South Africa) P.Flook | 3 ½ hp Triumph | 41.83 mph | 6:16.31.0 |
| 19 | 125 | (United Kingdom) A.J.C. Lindsay | 3 ½ hp Rover | 41.82 mph | 6:16.39.0 |
| 20 | 123 | (United Kingdom) R.G. Mundy | 3 ½ hp Triumph | 41.80 mph | 6:16.52.0 |
| 21 | 60 | (United Kingdom) V.E. Horseman | 3 ½ hp Singer | 41.71 mph | 6:17.52.0 |
| 22 | 99 | (United Kingdom) W.H. Longton | 3 ½ hp Alldays | 41.65 mph | 6:18.15.0 |
| 23 | 79 | (Isle of Man) W. Creyton | 3 ½ hp Ariel | 40.28 mph | 6:31.02.0 |
| 24 | 81 | (United Kingdom) O.G. Braid | 3 ½ hp Indian | 40.03 mph | 6:33.33.0 |
| 25 | 66 | (United Kingdom) R. Holloway | 3 ½ hp Premier | 39.44 mph | 6:51.03.0 |
| 26 | 76 | (United Kingdom) J.R. Alexander | 3 ½ hp Indian | 38.40 mph | 6:50.11.0 |
| 27 | 112 | (United Kingdom) S. Croft | 3 ½ hp Triumph | 37.88 mph | 6:55.03.0 |
| 28 | 115 | (United Kingdom) C.T. Newsome | 3 ½ hp Rover | 37.81 mph | 6:56.38.0 |
| 29 | 91 | (United Kingdom) S.C. Perryman | 3 ½ hp Quadrant | 37.46 mph | 7:01.31.0 |
| 30 | 132 | (United Kingdom) G.G. Boyton | 3 ½ hp Triumph | 37.33 mph | 7:01.59.0 |

Fastest Lap: H.O. Wood – 52.12 mph (43’ 10.0) on lap 3.
