= George Dowty =

English inventor and businessman

Sir George Herbert Dowty (27 March 1901 – 7 December 1975) was an English inventor and businessman.

He founded Dowty Aviation in the 1930s producing aircraft components such as hydraulic systems, undercarriage units, and warning devices.

== Early life ==
Dowty was born in Pershore, Worcestershire in 1901. He was sent to the Royal Grammar School Worcester after losing his right eye at the age of 12 making a firework.

He left in 1916 to take up a job as an apprentice for Heenan & Froude at a factory in Worcester. He later moved to Cheltenham to become a draughtsman for the same company. In 1918 Dowty became a draughtsman with the British Aerial Transport Company in London. He then joined the design office of the A. V. Roe & Company at Hamble near Southampton. In 1924 he went to the Gloster Aircraft Company where he worked on undercarriage design.

== Aircraft equipment ==
In 1931 he set up his own company in Cheltenham making aircraft equipment: for this purpose he leased a factory and bought Arle Court in Cheltenham. Dowty invented the first internally sprung aircraft wheel (used on the Gloster Gladiator) and by the time World War II had broken out the company was known as Dowty Aviation and was making the hydraulic systems in planes in Britain, Canada and the United States. His equipment was also used in the Concorde supersonic airliners.

== Dowty retarder ==
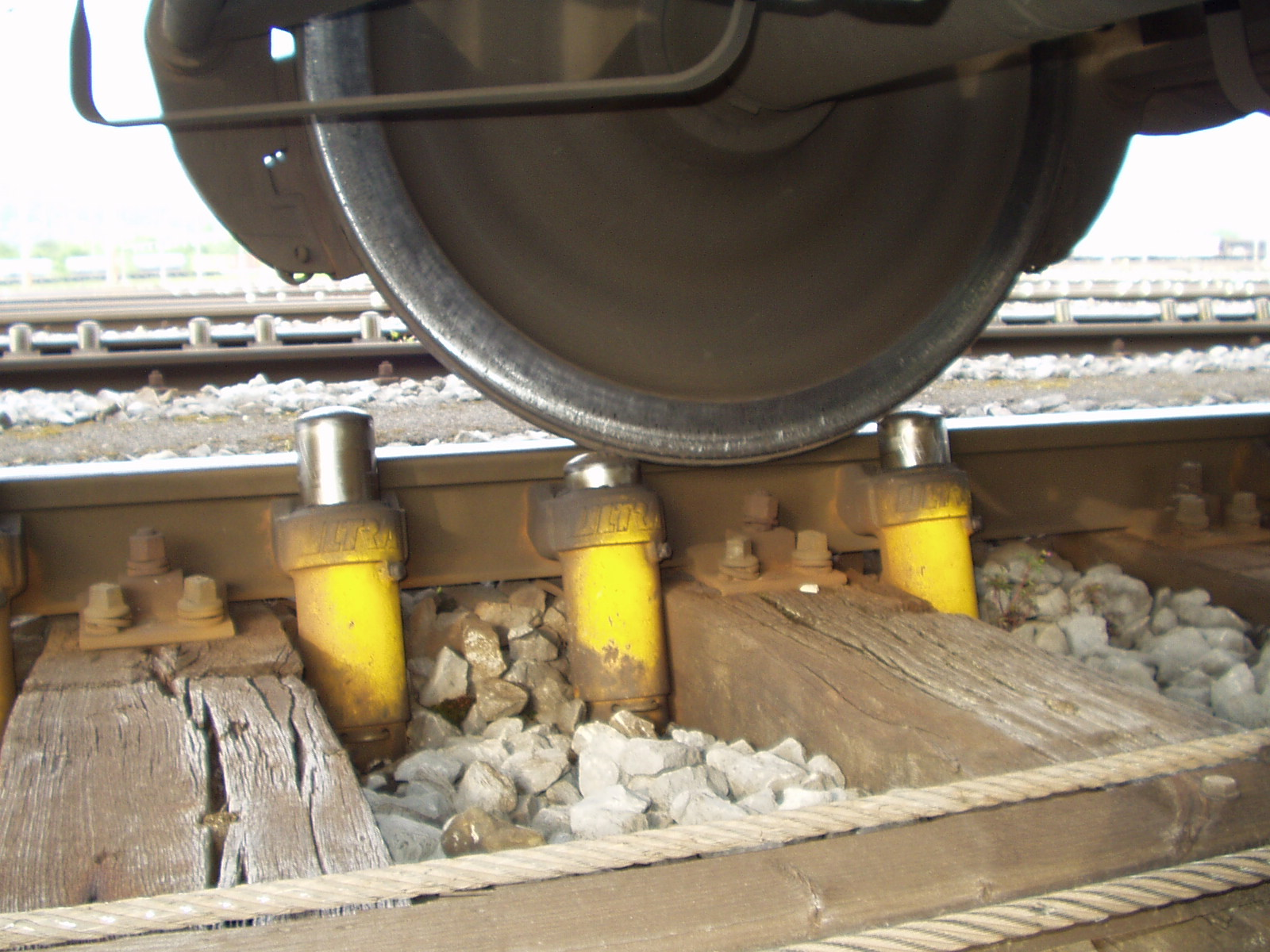
Dowty retarder

He also invented the "Dowty retarder" for use in railway classification yards, a hydraulic device that regulates the speed of rail cars as they roll down an inclined track. The devices are built for a specified speed, set at the factory. If the rail car is below the set speed, the device offers no resistance. (Certain hydraulically-powered Dowty retarders can actually boost the rail car's speed in that circumstance.) If the car speed is at or greater than the speed setting, an internal valve is activated to provide a resistance to the wheel, thus slowing the car. This keeps cars rolling within a relatively narrow range of speeds.

== Honours ==
In 1956 he was knighted for his services to the industry.

In 1961 he became the President of the Worcester Old Elizabethans' Association and amongst his other awards he was President of the Royal Aeronautical Society, winning the RAeS "British Gold Medal" in 1955, and President of the Worcestershire County Cricket Club. He was given the Freedom of the Borough of Cheltenham and Tewkesbury and was a Deputy Lieutenant of Gloucestershire. He received an Honorary Degree (Doctor of Science) from the University of Bath in 1966.

He died in 1975 in the Isle of Man and although his company was acquired by TI Group in 1992, an element of it still remains as Messier-Dowty, a subsidiary of the Safran Group and Dowty Propellers, a subsidiary of GE Aviation.

== Family ==
His first wife was Edith Dowty. In 1948 he married Marguerite Anne Gowans. She died on 24 March 2012, at age 87.

== See also ==
- Dowty Group
- Dowty Rotol
- Messier-Dowty
- Retarder (railroad)
