= Phillips Gadabout =

British moped

The Phillips Gadabout was one of a number of mopeds produced in the early 1960s by Phillips Cycles of Birmingham, England. The Gadabout was the more expensive model, boasting two-speed manual transmission and telescopic front fork suspension. The Gadabout had a pressed-steel frame, not unlike the German NSU Quickly whereas the more basic Phillips Panda, had a tubular bicycle-style frame. After Phillips Cycles became part of the Raleigh Industries/Tube Investments group, the Gadabout became a French Mótobecane Mobylette badged as a Phillips.
