= F. E. Baker Ltd =

Historical British motorcycle manufacturer

- Company type: Private
- Industry: Motorcycle
- Founded: 1906
- Founder: Frank Edward Baker
- Defunct: 1919
- Successor: Beardmore Precision Motorcycles
- Headquarters: Birmingham, United Kingdom
- Products: Motorcycle engines
- Owner: Frank Edward Baker
- Number of employees: 800

F. E. Baker Ltd was a British motorcycle engine and cyclecar engine manufacturer based in the Precision Works, Moorsom Street, Birmingham, England. Founded in 1906 by Frank Edward Baker, the company produced motorcycle engines under the Precision trademark until 1919. Precision engines were used by a wide range of motorcycle manufacturers in the United Kingdom and in other parts of the Commonwealth and were also used in cyclecars. Many manufacturers used the 'Precision' trademark as part of their model names, and in 1912 there was a 'Precision' motorcycle sold in Australia, but it is unclear if this was manufactured by F. E. Baker or just permitted use of the trademark by a motorcycle manufacturer.

== History ==
Frank Baker's engine production business grew at a fast rate, and in 1911 they added an 'excellently equipped fitting shop at the works of Messrs Webley and Scott' and by the 1911 Olympia Motorcycle Show in London there were 96 motorcycles with Baker's Precision engines.

Tom Biggs was appointed as chief designer in 1913. Frank Baker stopped motorcycle & engine production during the First World War. After the war they announced their own motorcycle with 350cc Precision 2-stroke engine designed by Tom Biggs. This had front and rear suspension, unit construction, and a pressed steel petrol tank that formed part of the frame. To inject capital into the company in 1919 the company came to a financial arrangement with William Beardmore and Company, a Scottish engineering and shipbuilding company based in Glasgow, and became Beardmore Precision Motorcycles.

== Motorcycle engines ==
F. E. Baker sold engines to motorcycle manufacturers and to dealers under the Precision name, and for some of the larger customers they had their own name cast into the timing cover and the word Precision absent from the crankcase casting. An article in 1914 says that the Peerless Precision V-twin made solely for export was now to be made available in the home market 'under certain circumstances'. Differences from the UK engines included round cylinder fins instead of square and an external flywheel. There was a thriving export market for Precision engines, especially in Australia, where companies like Lewis of Adelaide used the Precision engines. Engines were distributed through sole agents as follows :

A. G. Healing of Melbourne for Australia

Victor S. Welsford of Durban for South Africa, Rhodesia and Portuguese East Africa

J. B. Clarkson Ltd of Wellington for New Zealand is added to adverts from c1913

Whether F. E. Baker manufactured a complete motorcycle before WW1 is unclear, even though a 1912 Precision motorcycle is featured on an Australian postage stamp issued in 2018. It seems more likely the motorcycle was built by another manufacturer using a Precision engine and allowed to use the Precision name. Many Precision engined motorcycles used 'Precision' as part of the model name, hence Ivy-Precision, Grandex-Precision, etc. The 350cc 2-stroke announced in 1919, though, was a complete Precision motorcycle.

A remarkably wide range of engines was developed over just a few years - this list is mainly taken from the home market motorcycle engine catalogue circa 1913 (except where otherwise indicated) so does not include variants specific to the overseas market, or the engines adapted for cyclecar use which had modifications like alternative magneto locations.

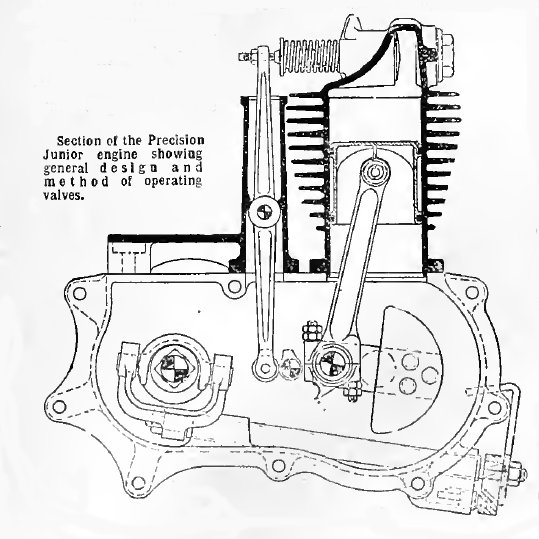
170cc Precision Junior Engine

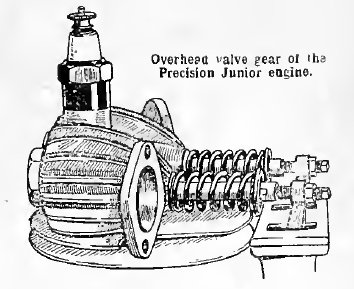
170cc Precision Junior Engine - Details of Valves

Model	Capacity	HP Rating	Bore x Stroke (mm)	Notes
Junior	170cc	2	60 x 60	Introduced Nov 1913, an unusual 4-stroke single with unit-construction and horizontal valves at the rear of the engine
Junior	199cc	2	65 x 60	1915 update, with bore increased to 65mm and vertical side-valves at the rear of the engine
?	225cc	2 1/2	64 x 70	2-stroke Appears in Nov 1914 Buyers guide for 3 makers, and Nov 1915 Buyer Guide solely for Grandex
M	293cc	2 3/4	70 x 76	Lightweight Touring 4-stroke side-valve single
MTT	350cc	2 3/4	70 x 90	Lightweight T.T. 4-stroke side-valve single
MO	350cc	2 3/4	70 x 90	4-stroke overhead-valve single
ME	350cc	2 3/4	70 x 90	"Green" 4-stroke water-cooled side-valve single (Gustavus Green designed cooling) 5 bhp guaranteed
?	350cc			The new 2-stroke single engine fitted to the Precision motorcycle announced in 1919
D	499cc	3 3/4	85 x 88	Standard Touring 4-stroke side-valve single
DTT	499cc	3 3/4	85 x 88	Standard T.T. 4-stroke side-valve single
DO	499cc	3 3/4	85 x 88	Standard 4-stroke overhead-valve single
DW	499cc	3 3/4	85 x 88	Standard 4-stroke water-cooled side-valve single
E	499cc	3 3/4	85 x 88	"Green" 4-stroke water-cooled side-valve single (Gustavus Green designed cooling) 8 bhp guaranteed
R	499cc	4	60 x 88	4-stroke V-twin side-valve - all the V-twins had 50 degrees between cylinders
P	598cc	4 1/4	89 x 96	4-stroke side-valve touring and side-car
PW	598cc	4 1/4	89 x 96	4-stroke single side-valve water-cooled
	602cc	4 1/4	66 x 88	1914 Export market 4-stroke V-twin (circular cylinder fins instead of square), external flywheel
L	750cc	6	75 x 85	4-stroke V-twin side-valve
LO	654cc	6		4-stroke V-twin overhead-valve
K	965cc	8	85 x 85	4-stroke V-twin side-valve
KW	965cc	8	85 x 85	4-stroke V-twin water-cooled side-valve
?	1096cc	10	85 x 96	July 1919 4-stroke V-twin air-cooled side-valve
?	1096cc	10	85 x 96	July 1919 4-stroke V-twin water-cooled side-valve

The "Green" engine was unusual in that it was water cooled but with heat exchangers mounted directly on either side of the cylinder. It was used by Ernest Smith and Woodhouse, who were motorcycle manufacturers (1912–1915), in their Regal-Green motorcycle in 1914. They had used other Baker 'Precision' engines in their previous motorcycles which they marketed as Regal-Precision.

Another unusual engine project was the development during 1912 of the engine invented by Dr Archibald Low in 1911. The engine was titled the Forced Induction Engine, but it used normal atmospheric induction but high pressure fuel admitted directly into the cylinder at peak compression, so in modern parlance would be a petrol direct injection engine. The engine was 104mm bore by 78mm stroke producing 15 bhp at 3,300rpm. It appears this engine did not make it into production, but it embodied some principles that have parallels in diesel engine and petrol direct injection engines of the future. Details of the engine can be found in US Patent 1124157 of 1913.

The 170cc engine had the unusual characteristic of horizontal overhead valves located at the rear of the cylinder, as well as unit-construction (see images). The valves were changed the next year to normal side-valves but remained across the rear of the engine, so this was an unusual engine. Engine capacity was increased to 199cc at the same time.

The 225cc Precision 2-stroke engine that appears against 3 different manufacturers in the November 1914 buyers guide (see info below) also appears in the 1915 Buyers Guide in the model by Grandex and in a short article on 1916 Torpedo motorcycles in November 1915, suggesting this engine did enter into production, though production may have been restricted due to the war effort. Even before war orders instructed companies to turn to making parts solely for the war effort, there were serious problems with loss of staff who volunteered for war service.

== Motorcycles that used Precision engines ==
Before WW1 there was a booming business with mainly cycle makers adding motorcycles to their production. This was facilitated by companies that provided engines, forks, seats, gearboxes, magnetos, lights and belt drives, allowing the frame maker to assemble his motorcycle. One of the main engine suppliers was JA Prestwich Industries (known as JAP), and to some extent F. E. Baker were targeting their market. The Precision V-twin introduced at the Olympia show in November 1911, followed the same 50 degree V angle as the existing JAP V-twin. While some motorcycle and cyclecar manufacturers stuck to a single supplier, others swapped between engine suppliers, and some allowed customers to decide which engine they wanted fitting. In November each year the Motor Cycle show was held at Olympia, and a Buyers Guide published which in most cases revealed the engine supplier used by the companies, enabling an idea of the large number of motorcycles using Precision engines in the UK.

Name	Capacity	Notes
A.S.L.	499cc	Air Springs Ltd, Stafford (motorcycles had air suspension)
Brown	292cc	Brown Brother Ltd, Great Eastern Street, London
Calthorpe	170cc, 199cc	The Minstrel and Rea Cycle Co., Birmingham
Campion	597cc, 750cc V-twin, 965cc V-twin, 499cc Green	Campion Cycle Company Ltd, Stodman Street, Newark
Dene	199cc, 499cc, 597cc, 750cc V-twin, 225cc 2-stroke	Dene Motor Co, Haymarket, Newcastle-on-Tyne
D.O.T.	499cc, 597cc	H. Reed & Co, Deansgate, Manchester
Dunkley	199cc, 499cc V-twin	Dunkley, Jamaica Row, Birmingham.
ELI	292cc, 499cc, 597cc	Eli Clarke Motor Mfg. Co., Station Road, Bristol
Elswick	498cc V-twin	Elswick,
Endrick	499cc, 597cc	Endrick, Olton, Near Birmingham
Grandex-Precision	170cc, 199cc, 292cc, 350cc, 499cc, 597cc, 499cc V-twin, 750cc V-twin, 225cc 2-stroke	Grandex Cycle Co., 28, Grays Inn Rd., London
Ivy	292, 350cc, 499cc, 597cc, 750cc V-twin and 499cc Green engines	S. A. Newman, Lichfield Road, Birmingham
Ixion	499cc, 597cc	Ixion Motor Manufacturing Co, Gt. Tindal St, Ladywood, Birmingham
Juno	597cc	Metropolitan Machinists Co., 75-6 Bishopgate Street Without, London
Kumfurt	499cc	Kumfurt Motorcycles and Accessories Co, Cookham Rise, near Maidenhead, Berkshire
Little Giant	199cc, 225cc 2-stroke	Little Giant Motocyclette Co., 101 High Street, Uxbridge, Middlesex
Martin Junior	199cc	Cars and Motor Sundries, Ltd. (Martin Dept.), 175 Shaftesbury Avenue, London, W.C.
Mead	199cc, 499cc, 597cc	Mead Cycles of Paradise Street, Liverpool
Midget Bicar	499cc, 597cc	J. T. Brown, Oxford Road, Reading
New Comet	199cc, 292cc, 499cc, 597cc	A. H. Haden, Princip Street, Birmingham. Also used the Green engine c1913.
OK	292cc, 499cc, 597cc	Humphries & Dawes, Hall Green Works, Lancaster Street, Birmingham
Osmond	499cc	Osmonds Ltd, Greet, Birmingham
Pilot	199cc, 499cc, 597cc, 499cc V-twin	Pilot Cycle and Motor Co., 117 Soho Road and Farm Street, Birmingham.
Regal-Precision	350cc Green, 499cc Green, 602cc V-twin	Ernest Smith and Woodhouse, 15 High Street, Saltley, Birmingham
ROC	598cc	Messrs Robertsons, 159 Great Portland Street, London
Samson	499cc	Reg Samson, Birmingham
Steelhouse	499cc	123 Steelhouse Lane, Birmingham
Sun	170cc, 499cc, 597cc	Sun Cycle and Fittings Co., Aston Brook Street, Birmingham.
Torpedo	225cc 2-stroke, 293cc, 498cc V-twin, 597cc	F. Hopper & Co, Barton-on-Humber, Lincolnshire
Victoria	170cc, 292cc, 499cc, 498cc V-twin, 598cc	Victoria Motor and Cycle Co. Ltd., Dennistoun, Glasgow, Scotland
Westovian	499cc, 498cc V-twin	R. V. Heath of South Shields
Win-Precision	499cc	Wincycle Trading Co., 106/107 Great Saffron Hill, London.

Other makes of motorcycle to use Precision engines before WW1, include Zenith, Cleveland, New Imperial, Coventry-Eagle, Armis, Chater-Lea, S. G. Neal (Neal Precision) and in Australia A. G. Healing had distribution rights for the engines, making their own motorcycles under the tradename 'Peerless', but also supplying others such as Vivian Lewis Ltd, and Bullock.

== Cyclecars that used Precision engines ==
The following cyclecars used 'Precision' engines.

The Premier cyclecar used a 7-9 hp Precision air-cooled engine.

The Morgan three-wheeler from 1912 to 1914 had a Precision V-twin engine option.

The Bradwell 4-wheeled cyclecar.

The Depford from Depford Co., Evelyn Street, Deptford, London used either the Blumfield, J.A.P., or Precision water-cooled engines.

The Dewcar, a British four-wheeled cyclecar made from 1913 to 1914 by D.E.W. Engineering Co Ltd of Eynsford, Kent using the single cylinder 597cc air-cooled engine.

The J.A.R. cyclecar by J. A. Ryley of Martinean Street, Birmingham used the 964cc air-cooled Precision engine (J. A. Riley produced complete kits of parts to be built by manufacturers or private individuals).

The Ranger made by the Ranger Cycle Co, West Orchard, Coventry used the water-cooled version of the 964cc V-twin.

The V.A.L. monocar made by V.A.L. Motors, 314 Bradford Street, Birmingham made monocars, and at the 1913 show offered either a model using water cooled Precision V-twin (model KW), or the single cylinder 499cc water-cooled Green motor.

The Walker 1912-1914 cyclecar made by R. Walker and Sons of Tyseley, Birmingham, used Precision engines.

The Wall Tricarriage of 1913-1915 made by A. W. Wall of Hay Mills, Birmingham used 4 1/4 hp (for goods carrying) or 6 hp (for the two-seater) Precision engines.

The Warne cyclecar, was launched in 1912 with a JAP air-cooled engine, but by 1913 had swapped to air-cooled or water-cooled Precision engines (models K and KW).

The Woodrow cyclecar changed from using JAP engines to Precision engines in 1914 or 1915.

At the end of WW1 the Grahame-White buckboard used the 350cc Precision 2-stroke engine.
