= Dowty Group =

British aircraft equipment manufacturer

- Type: Public
- Industry: Aircraft equipment
- Founded: 1935
- Defunct: 1992
- Fate: Acquired
- Successor: TI Group
- Headquarters: Cheltenham, UK
- Key people: Sir Robert Hunt (Chairman)

Dowty Group was a leading British manufacturer of aircraft equipment. It was listed on the London Stock Exchange and was once a constituent of the FTSE 100 Index. The firm ceased operating as an individual entity following its acquisition by TI Group in 1992.

The company has its origins as the Aircraft Components Company in 1931 and the work of British inventor and businessman George Dowty. In 1934, Dowty achieved its breakthrough sale of its innovative undercarriage designs, being contracted by the Gloster Aircraft Company to provide oleo struts for the Gloster Gauntlet biplane. In 1935, as the business expanded to meet demand, Dowty founded a new manufacturing venture to produce his aviation products, which was named Dowty Aviation.

It quickly secured numerous additional orders and manufacturing facilities to cope with the pressing demands of the Second World War, a significant majority of British aircraft production incorporating the firm's various products. By the end of the conflict, Dowty Aviation was a major British manufacturing interest, possessing many production plants at home and overseas in Canada and the United States. By the end of hostilities in 1945, Dowty had reportedly manufactured 87,786 landing gears and 984,388 hydraulic units. A major drive to apply its technology to other commercial ventures was taken in the post-war era.

Throughout much of its existence, Dowty Group specialised in the manufacture of hydraulic and actuation systems, advanced propellers, turbine engine components and tubular systems; it was also a long-term owner of the Hamble aircraft structures business. The Dowty Group also diversified into various commercial and industrial sectors, venturing into telecommunications, software, and becoming a market leader in the manufacturing of mining equipment.

== History ==
=== Origins ===
What would eventually become Dowty Group was founded as the Aircraft Components Company in 1931 by British inventor and businessman George Dowty, who was working as a draughtsman for the Gloster Aircraft Company at that time. Initially, this entity was only a shell company, having no staff, no capital and being operated out of a registered office in Lloyds Avenue, London. It quickly became insolvent after the company's first order, for aircraft shock absorber struts from the Civilian Aircraft Co of Hull, was not paid in time.

In June 1931, Dowty decided to resign from Gloster to form Aircraft Components Ltd, which was based in 10 Lansdown Terrace Lane in Cheltenham. In November 1931, the first two employees were recruited. The company's first success involved Dowty's newly-invented internally sprung wheel; the first order for six of these wheels was placed by the Japanese Kawasaki Company, manufacturing was performed at the company's Lansdown Terrace premises. In 1934, Dowty achieved a major sale after approached aviation engineer Henry Folland of Gloster to demonstrate his own design for oleo struts; these were promptly ordered for the Gloster Gauntlet aircraft. This initial and sizable production order was rapidly followed by a similar order for the Gloster Gladiator.

In 1935, Dowty founded a new business to manufacture this aircraft equipment under the name Dowty Aviation. That same year, the company leased a factory and bought new premises in Arle Court, Cheltenham. In 1936, Aviation became a public company, Dowty himself only held a small stake in its overall equity. Dowty Aviation would secure numerous additional orders; amongst other customers, it provided landing gear for Frank Whittle's ground-breaking Gloster E.1/44, a jet-propelled aeroplane that first flew on 15 May 1941.

=== Second World War ===
Throughout the Second World War, Dowty Aviation's products were a key subsystem of nearly all British aircraft that were manufactured during the conflict. Its product range included hydraulic systems, undercarriage units, tail wheels, electrical instrumentation and warning devices. Specific aircraft incorporating Dowty products include the Hawker Hurricane, Bristol Beaufighter, Hawker Typhoon, Westland Whirlwind, Avro Lancaster, Handley Page Halifax, Short Stirling, Short Sunderland, Blackburn Skua, Avro Anson, Miles Master, and the de Havilland Rapide. The first jet fighter to enter Allied service, the Gloster Meteor, also used Dowty Aviation technology.

By the end of the conflict, Dowty Aviation had clearly established itself as a major British manufacturing interest, particularly in relation to the expanded aviation industry. New production plants had been established not only throughout the British Isles, but also overseas in Canada and the United States as well. By the end of hostilities in 1945, Dowty had reportedly manufactured 87,786 landing gears and 984,388 hydraulic units.

=== Post-war activities ===
Shortly after the Second World War, Dowty Aviation decided to apply its hydraulics technology to wider fields, venturing into motorcycle suspension forks, hydraulic pit props, industrial pumps, and hydraulic control systems. In 1945, Dowty Seals was founded; during 1950, another new entity, Dowty Hydraulic Units, was created, while Dowty Fuel Systems followed in 1953. Various businesses were also acquired by the growing company, including New Mendip Engineering in 1948 and Coventry Precision in 1951.

In 1954, George Dowty's contribution to the aviation industry was formally recognised by the Royal Aeronautical Society, being awarded its gold medal for outstanding designs and development of aircraft equipment.

As the various Dowty-owned companies continued to grow in both size and number, it became apparent that a new business structure was needed to oversee and manage the other businesses. Accordingly, on 18 March 1954, Dowty Group Limited was incorporated, its headquarters being established at Arle Court, Cheltenham. By this point, the business' Canadian operation was reportedly generating roughly 50 per cent of its total turnover.

During 1960, Dowty Group acquired Rotol Airscrews, giving it a propeller manufacturing capability; this led to the creation of the Dowty Rotol division. In 1961, it acquired British aviation company Boulton Paul Aircraft, a former large scale manufacturer of aircraft, involved in the production of research aircraft as well as aviation subsystems such as powered control units, as well as other activities. For a time, this part the business was known as Dowty Boulton Paul Ltd.

In the 1960s, Dowty Group contributed to several major British aviation projects, including the development and provision of fuel control systems for the Harrier jump jet and of power controls for the Concorde supersonic airliner. Internationally, the company closely collaborated with the French Group Messier on aircraft landing gear and hydraulics over a long period of time.

In the late 1980s, Dowty Group decided to diversify into telecommunications and computer equipment, acquiring Datatel, a software business, in 1987, Case Group plc, a telecommunications company, in 1988 and Dataco, a provider of network services, in 1990.

== Acquisition, restructuring and absorption ==
During 1992, Dowty Group was acquired by TI Group, another large British specialist engineering company. Reportedly, Dowty had been regarded by TI's chairman, Sir Christopher Lewinton, as his number-one target and had made substantial preparations towards its acquisition, although the bid was not regarded as being a hostile one despite Dowty's board initially having spurned the proposition. The Takeover Panel subsequently investigated the behaviour of Dowty and its advisers during the bid and issued a censure of its advisers in August 1992 after the acquisition had successfully completed.

The company promptly underwent heavy restructuring. By August 1993, TI Group had made 1,500 of ex-Dowty workforce redundant since the acquisition, equivalent to 20 per cent of the workforce; this was reportedly a consequence of the unit's performance being below expectations. In 1993, TI Group decided to dispose of seven former Dowty Group companies engaged in the manufacture of electronic equipment; this was achieved in the form of a management buy-out, this deal resulted in the creation of Ultra Electronics.

In 1994, TI Group transferred the Dowty landing gear business into a joint venture that it formed with SNECMA, which became known as Messier-Dowty. According to Tony Edwards, the chief executive and chairman of the merged entity, while acknowledging there having been some difficulties due to a lack of preparation, he regarded it as being: "a successful example of European integration that works". During late 1998, Messier-Dowty became wholly owned by French business Safran.

== See also ==
- Aerospace industry in the United Kingdom
- Dowty Rotol
