= Phillips Panda =

1960 Phillips Panda Mark 1 (P40)

The Phillips Panda was one of a number of mopeds produced by the Phillips Cycles company of England in the 1950s and early 1960s. The factory also produced the slightly more expensive Phillips Gadabout models.

Phillips Cycles Ltd. was a respected British bicycle manufacturer based in Bridge Street, Smethwick, England. Founded by J.A. Phillips and E.W Bohle in Birmingham around 1892, its history ended in the 1970s, by which time it had become part of Raleigh Industries, itself a part of the huge Tube Investments group. For a number of years, the company was the second-largest bicycle producer in Britain after Raleigh. The "Phillips" brand is still used around the world, especially in China and the Far East, having been licensed by Raleigh.

== General Description ==
The single-speed Panda Mark 1 and 2 utilised what probably became the last manufacturing installation of the 49 cc German Rex cyclemotor engine, which first appeared around 1950 in the form of a front-mounted, belt-driven cycle attachment, the strong but basic Panda frame being specifically built to house the motor.

The Rex engine at 6:1 compression has no bhp given but carries a 12-millimetre Bing carburettor to the aluminium barrel with sleeve liner in conventional fore & aft porting layout. The crankcase cavity unusually extends all the way to the back of the motor to include lubrication of the reduction gear and its bearings by the induction gases. This results in a reduced scavenge pressure. Mounted on the end of the output shaft with the sprocket inboard, the tiny 2½" Rex dry clutch is a particularly frail pull-operated device and typically responsible for the final demise of most machines.

The Panda has a 'grip-locking' clutch lever and a carburettor set-up that provides a very reliable and steady tick-over. The rear brake comprises a back pedal Perry Coaster hub and a conventional bicycle-type hub brake, handlebar lever operated for the front brake.

Mark 1 version had no suspension but the mark 2 had telescopic front forks, larger headlamp and deeper valanced rear mudguard but retained the solid rear frame.

The electrical system comprised a Miller flywheel magneto with lighting coils.

The final Panda mark 3 was simply an imported French Mobylette made by Motobécane badged as a Phillips. It had nothing in common with the previous home-produced models.

== Technical specifications (Mark 1 and 2) ==
Engine:

- Rex air-cooled, single cylinder, two-stroke
- bore 40.5 mm
- stroke 38.25 mm
- capacity 49 cc
- compression ratio 6:1
- Single Gear Ratio 17.3:1

Clutch

- Rex Dry multi-plate

Carburettor

- Bing model 1/12/27

Ignition & Lighting

- Miller flywheel magneto 6 volt 18 watt (Headlamp 6 V 15/15 W, tail lamp 6 V 3 W)

Lubrication

- Petroil mixture 16:1

Fuel Tank

- Approx 4 litres including 0.4 litres reserve.

Brakes:

- Front - 3.5 inch hub (mark 1), handlebar lever operated
- Rear - Back pedalling Perry Coaster Hub

Tyres

- 23 X 2 inch with Schrader type valves

Size

- Overall length 1820 mm, height 940 mm, width 152 mm

Total Weight

- Approx 32 kg

Equipment

- 3.5 inch headlamp (mark 1), electric horn, bipod stand, rear carrier, tyre inflator, large tool bag and tool kit

Finish

- Silver Grey with tank and fairings in Flamboyant Red
