= Dewcar =

Overview
- Manufacturer: D.E.W. Engineering Co Ltd
- Production: 1913-1914

Body and chassis
- Class: cyclecar

Powertrain
- Engine: Precision single- or twin-cylinder
- Transmission: two- or three-speed

Chronology
- Successor: Victor

The Dewcar was a British four-wheeled cyclecar made from 1913 to 1914 by D.E.W. Engineering Co Ltd of Eynsford, Kent. The car was designed by Harold E. Dew and was developed through a series of one-offs starting in 1910.

The first production models were made in 1913 with single-seat bodies and used a single-cylinder Precision engine with a tax horsepower of 4.5. A two-seater was added shortly afterwards with a larger twin-cylinder engine with either air- or water-cooling. The single seater cost £75 and the two-seater £95 or £115 with the water-cooled option.

== D'Ultra cycle car (also D-Ultra and D.Ultra) ==

Harold Dew left the company in February 1914 and set up a new concern at Charlotte Place, Clapham, London registered as D.U. Manufacturing Co making a car called the D'Ultra. This was available as either a two-seat car or delivery van and used a water-cooled Chater-Lea 8 hp 50-degree V-twin engine with 4-speed friction transmission. This transmission involved a prop-shaft to which was attached a friction disc driving a countershaft and thence by a single roller chain to the cantilever sprung rear axle, which was not fitted with a differential. The front suspension was by a transverse semi-elliptic leaf spring, and the steering was of the rack and pinion type. As was common with cycle cars the braking was only on the rear wheels, and while this was initially described as being both by internal expanding and contracting types operating on two drums the reality was rather different (see below). The ladder frame is described as being 'made of re-inforced ash, and is of quite simple design with only three cross-members'. Price was £115 complete with head lamps, hood, and wind screen.

A four-seat model was added for 1915. Production seems to have stopped in 1916, though the 1913-1917 Red Book suggests it was available in 1917 at £150.

Detailed plans for the two-seater car were published in two parts in the Model Engineer magazine commencing 1 May 1919. There is no 'by-line' but the article appears to have been written by the car's designer. An example is the description of the brakes as follows :

...I had in mind to have both an internal and an external brake on both wheels - hence the sixth hole just above the cam bolt hole. After giving the external brakes a good trial, I found the internal ones did all the work I required them to do; so I just cut out the external ones altogether, and connected the foot brake pedal to one side and the side brake lever to the other side, which means you only brake on one wheel. But this does not matter at all as owing to the axle being solid and both wheels and brake drums being keyed solid to it you get no skidding effect whatever.

In addition to drawings, the Model Engineer article includes photographs of the car both complete and as a bare chassis.

While 1914 reviews use the name D'Ultra, and the 1913-1917 Red Book used D. Ultra, the Model Engineer article in 1919 used D-Ultra.

== Victor car ==
After Harold Dew left D.E.W. Engineering production of the original car was taken up by Victor Motors, still in Eynsford and possibly the same company re-registered under a new name. A 965 cc Precision V-twin engine was used. In 1915 manufacture moved to Tyler Apparatus of Ealing, London with a larger 1100 cc 4-cylinder engine. The last ones were made in 1920

== See also ==
- List of car manufacturers of the United Kingdom
