= Bradwell (car) =

Overview
- Manufacturer: Bradwell and Co.
- Production: 1914

Body and chassis
- Class: Cyclecar
- Body style: Single-seat, open

Powertrain
- Engine: Precision single-cylinder 3 1/2 hp

The Bradwell was a British four-wheeled cyclecar made in 1914 by Bradwell & Company in Folkestone, Kent.

The car had a lightweight single-seat body and was powered by a Precision, single-cylinder, 3 1/2 hp engine driving the rear wheels by belts. It cost £65.
