= Woodrow (automobile) =

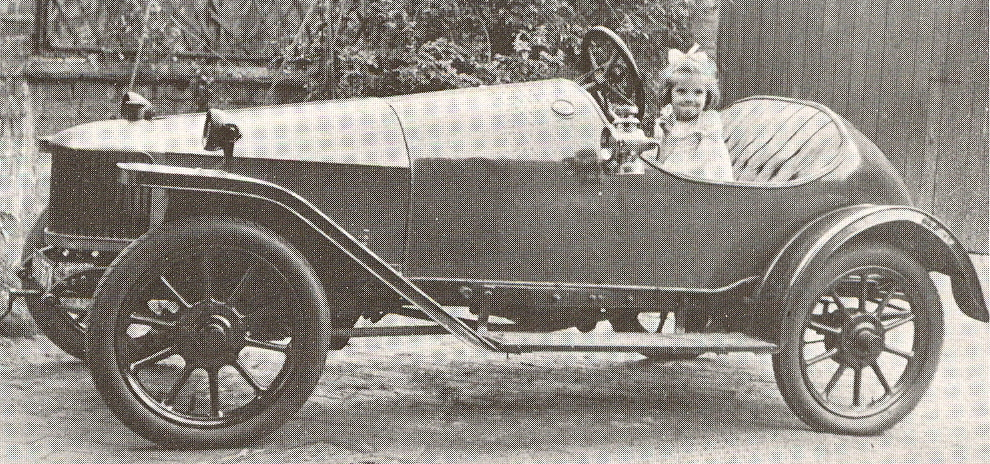
1913 Woodrow

The Woodrow was a British cyclecar manufactured in Stockport from 1913 to 1915.

The 1913 cars were powered by a choice of water or air-cooled V twin engine of 964 cc made by JAP, with a three-speed gearbox and chain drive to a back axle that was unusually, for cyclecars of the time, fitted with a differential).

In 1914 or possibly 1915 the engine was replaced by a larger 'Precision' V twin, water-cooled only, of 1090 cc made by F. E. Baker Ltd.

A sports version was also made with a very long tapered bonnet. The cars were quite large by cyclecar standards, with a width of 48 inches (1219 mm) and length of 130 inches (3302 mm).

== See also ==
- List of car manufacturers of the United Kingdom
