= Warne (car) =

Warne 8
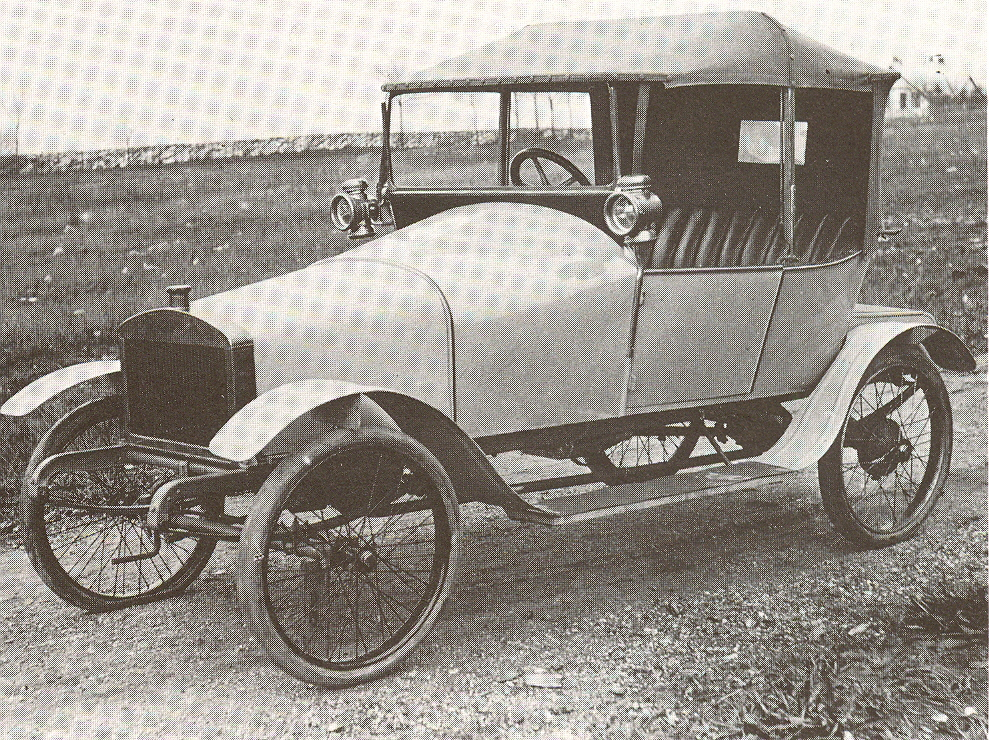
- 1914 Warne

Overview
- Manufacturer: Pearsall Warne Ltd
- Production: 1912-1915

Body and chassis
- Class: cyclecar
- Body style: two seat open

Powertrain
- Engine: JAP V twin cylinder 964 or 1070 cc also Precision V-twin of 964cc in air-cooled or water-cooled form

Dimensions
- Wheelbase: 78 in (1,981 mm) or 84 in (2,134 mm)
- Length: 114 in (2,896 mm)
- Width: 50 in (1,270 mm)

The Warne was a British 4-wheeled cyclecar made from 1912 to 1915 by Pearsall Warne Ltd at the Icknield Works in Letchworth, Hertfordshire.

The car had a lightweight two-seat open body with full weather equipment. The car was launched in 1912 fitted with a JAP, V twin air-cooled engine of 964 cc with an RAC horsepower rating of 8 hp. but by the 1913 Olympia show the company had swapped to using F. E. Baker Ltd Precision 50 degree V-twin engines of 964cc. One model had the air cooled version of the engine, and the other used the water-cooled version.

In the original car the drive was to the rear wheels by belts, but the water-cooled version for 1913 had a 3-speed with reverse gearbox, the air-cooled version retaining the belt system. The suspension used half elliptic leaf springs all round.

The engine size increased to 1070 cc in 1915.

It originally cost £99. The 1914 models with Precision engines were £120 for the air-cooled version and £130 for the water-cooled version. The air-cooled version was given a conventional appearance by fitting a dummy radiator.

In mid 1913 six cars a week were being made.

== See also ==
- List of car manufacturers of the United Kingdom
