= Retarder (railroad) =

Device used to slow railroad cars in classification yards

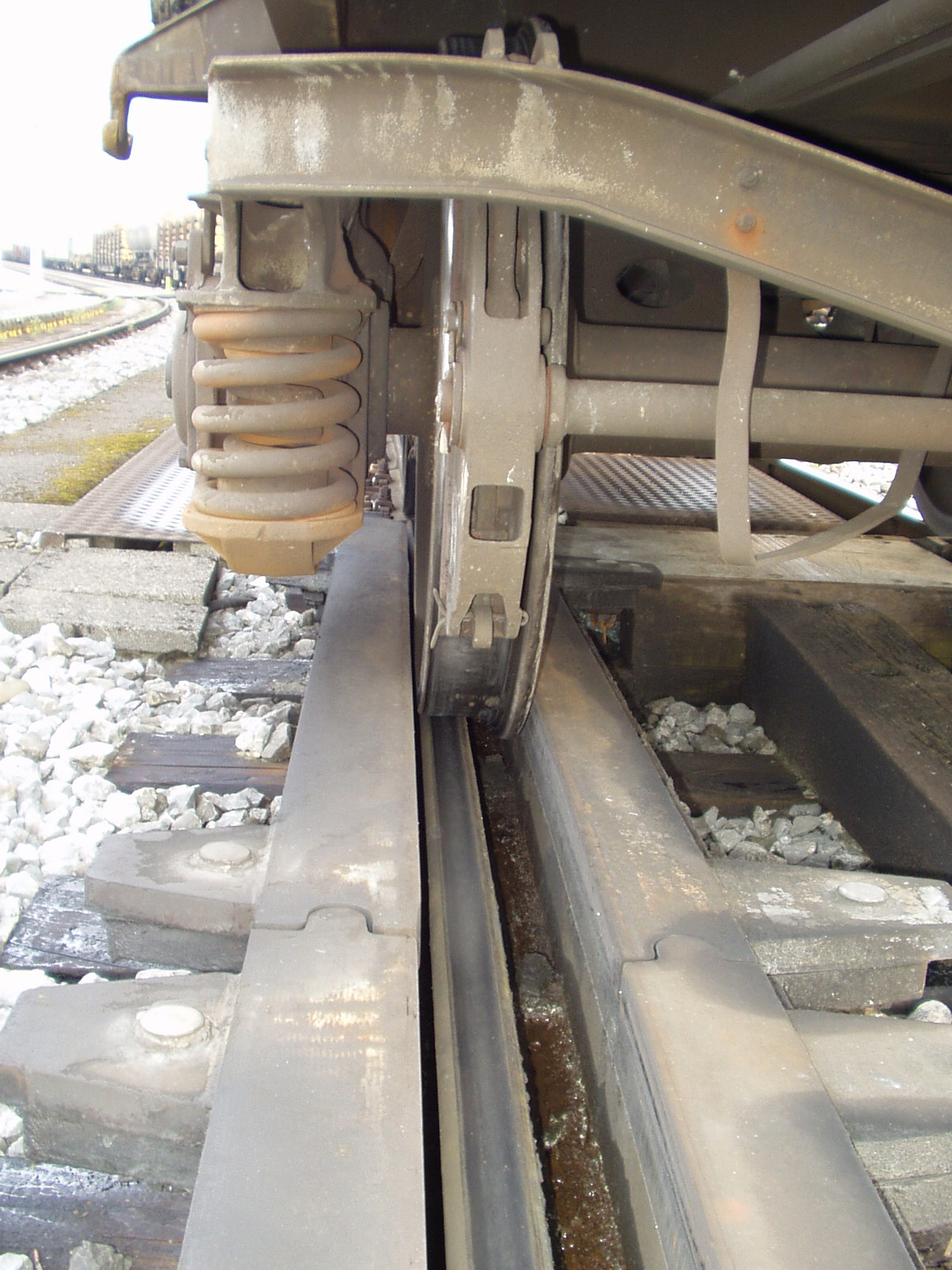
The retarders grip the sides of the wheels on passing cars to slow them down.

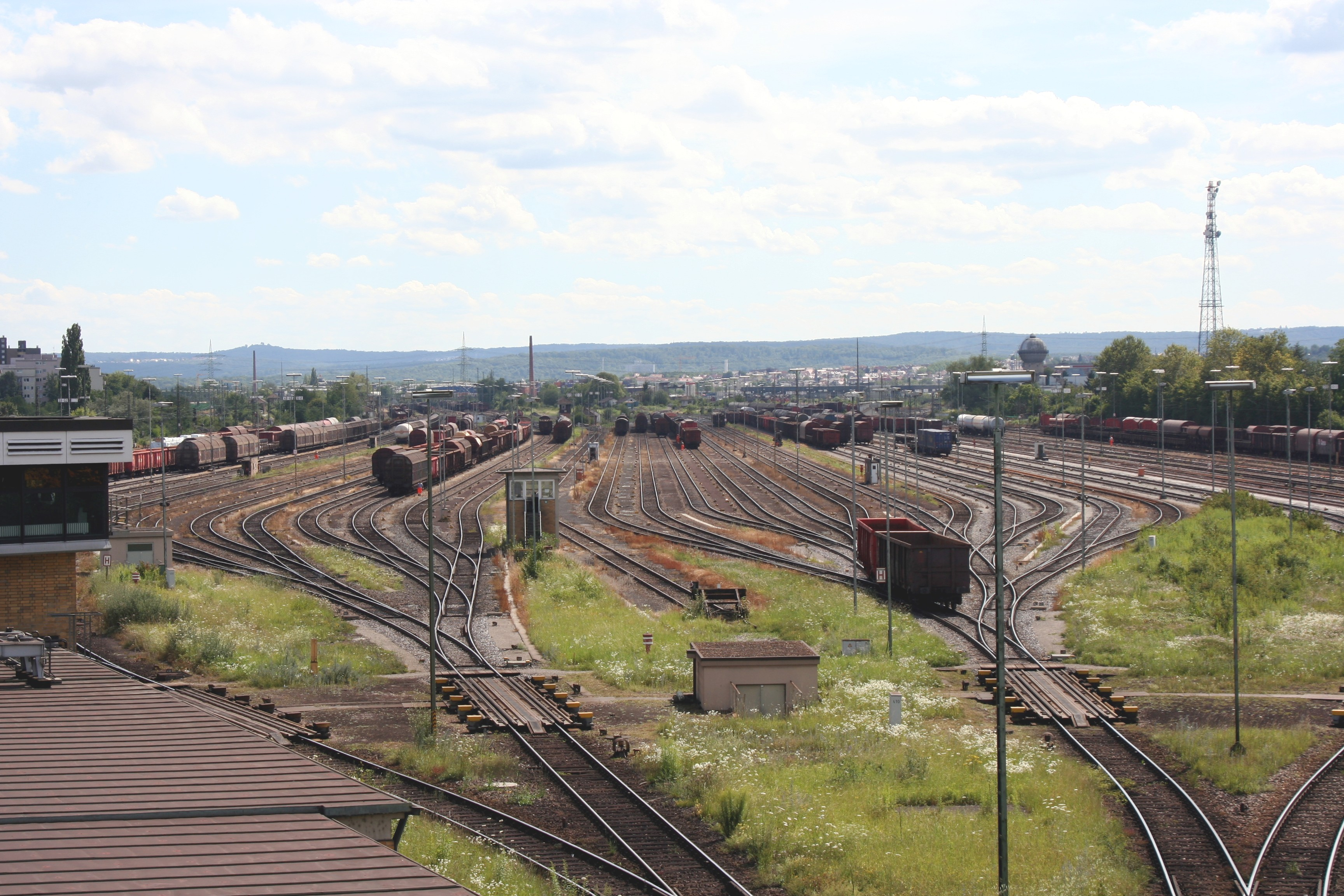
Classification bowl of Kornwestheim classification yard (near Stuttgart, Germany). Two retarders are clearly visible in this photo.

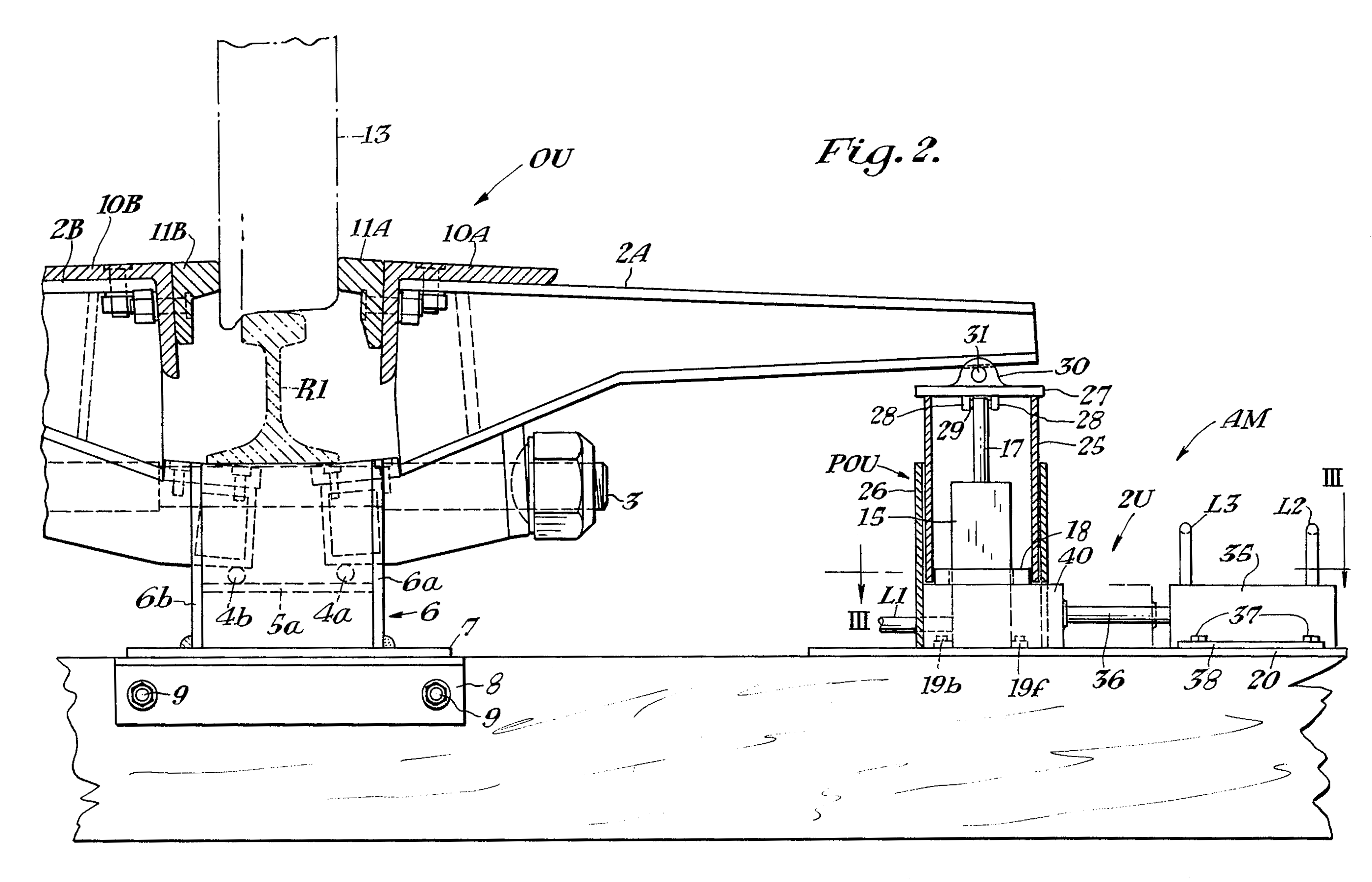
A type of car retarder. As the cylinder 15 pushes an end of the lever 2A, the rotation motion of the lever 2A pivoted at the rod 4a makes the brake shoe 11A at the opposite end thrust against the wheel 13, so as to brake the car. Peter M. Noble, United States Patent 3,827,533, 1974.

In rail transport, a retarder is a device installed in a classification yard used to reduce the speed of freight cars as they are sorted into trains.

== Construction ==
Each retarder consists of a series of stationary brakes surrounding a short section of each on the track that grip and slow the cars' wheels through friction as they roll through them.

== Computer control ==
Modern retarders are computer controlled to apply a precise amount of pressure on the wheels so that cars rolling down a yard's hump are slowed to a safe speed for coupling with cars already standing on the yard's tracks.

== Inert retarder ==
An inert retarder holds a cut of classified railcars to keep them from rolling out of a yard.

== See also ==
- Dowty retarders
- Retarder (mechanical engineering)
- Wheel stop
