= Campion Cycle Company =

British bike maker

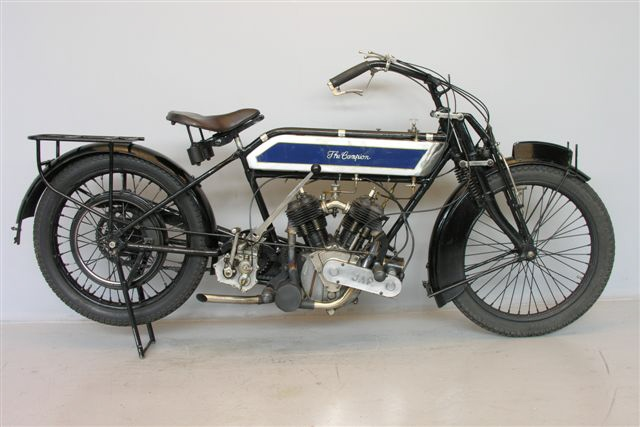
A 1913 Campion motorcycle

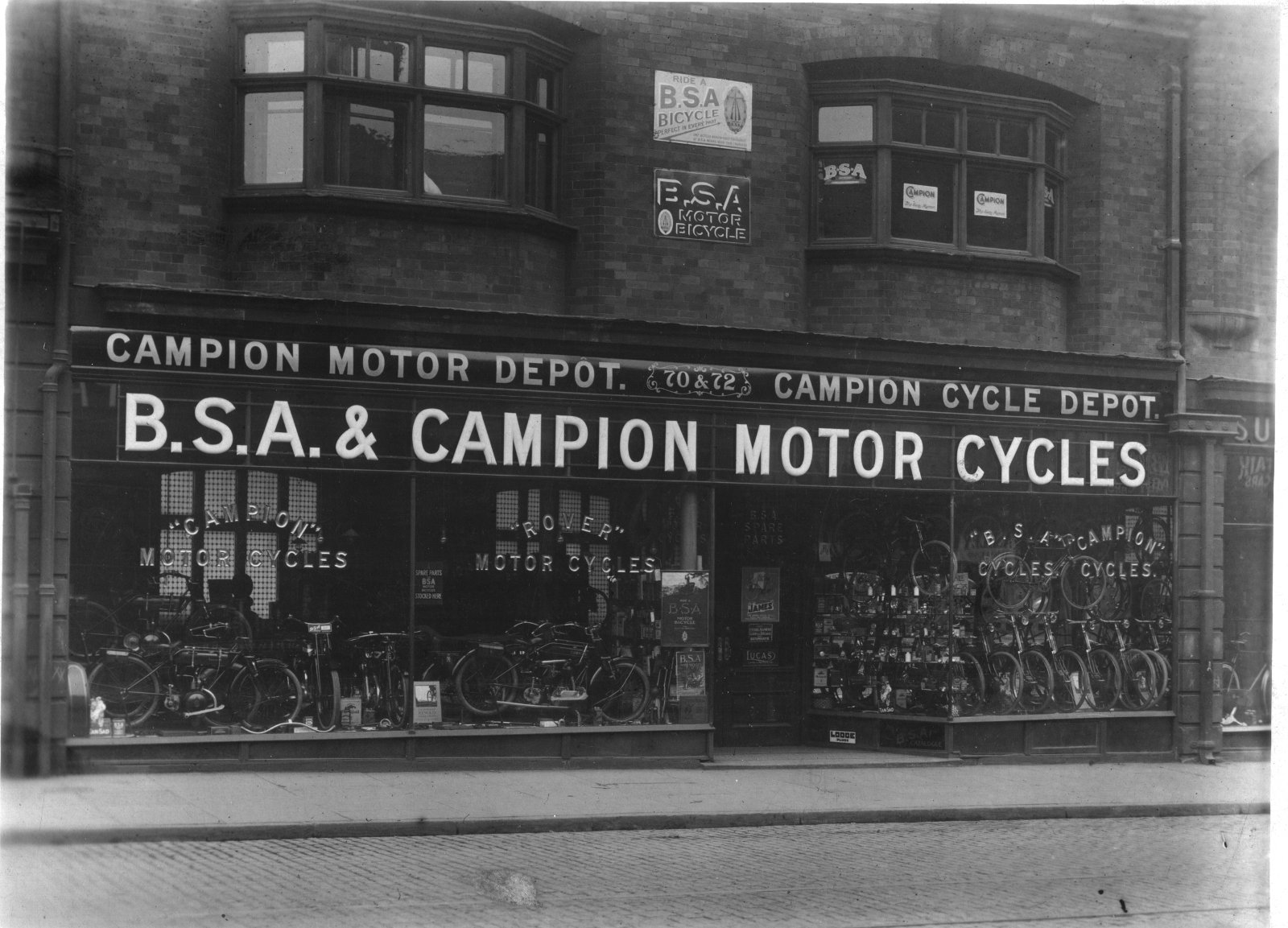
70–72 Renshaw st. Liverpool, UK, about 1909

The Campion Cycle Company was a British bicycle, cyclecar and motor cycle maker, active from 1893 to 1926 and based in Nottingham, England. In 1927 it was purchased by Currys.

== Motor cycles ==
Campion motorcycles used a variety of proprietary engines including Minerva, MMC, Fafnir, Precision, Villiers, Blackburne and JAP.

They also supplied frames to other companies.

== Campion Cyclecar ==
The Cyclecar was made only in 1913 and was powered by a JAP V twin with a rating of 8 hp. It used a friction transmission system and drove the rear wheels by a belt.

== See also ==
- List of bicycle manufacturing companies
- List of car manufacturers of the United Kingdom
