= Phillips Cycles =

British bicycle manufacturer

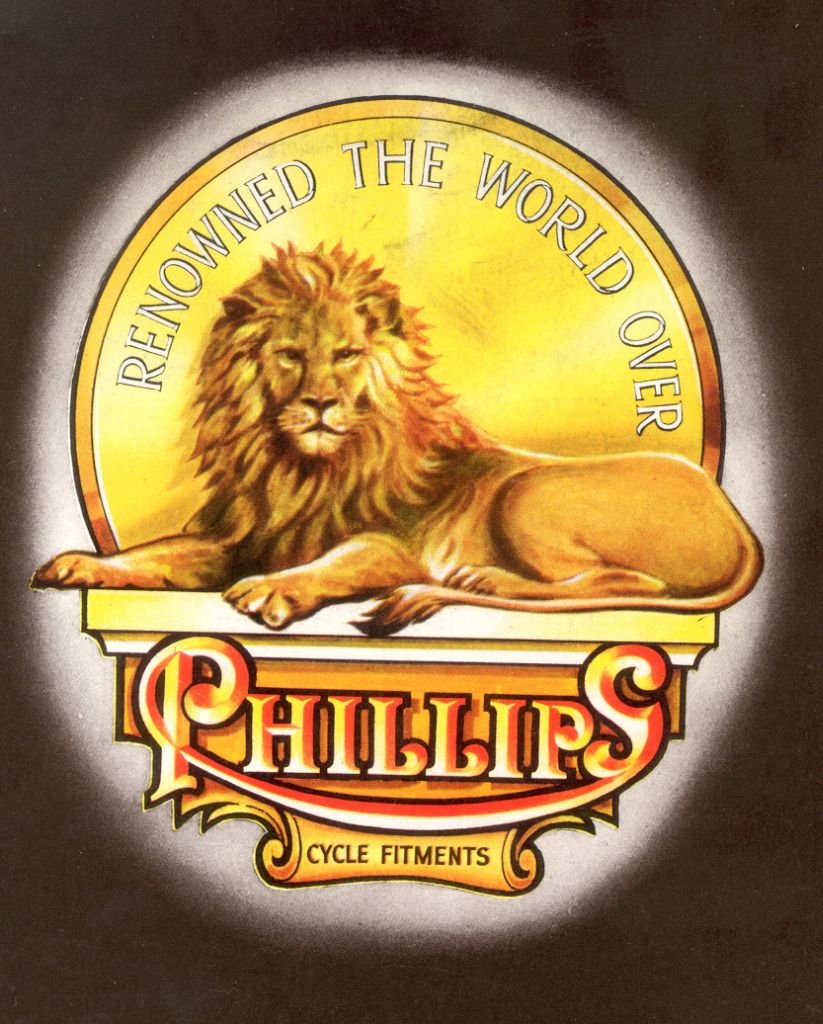
Trade mark

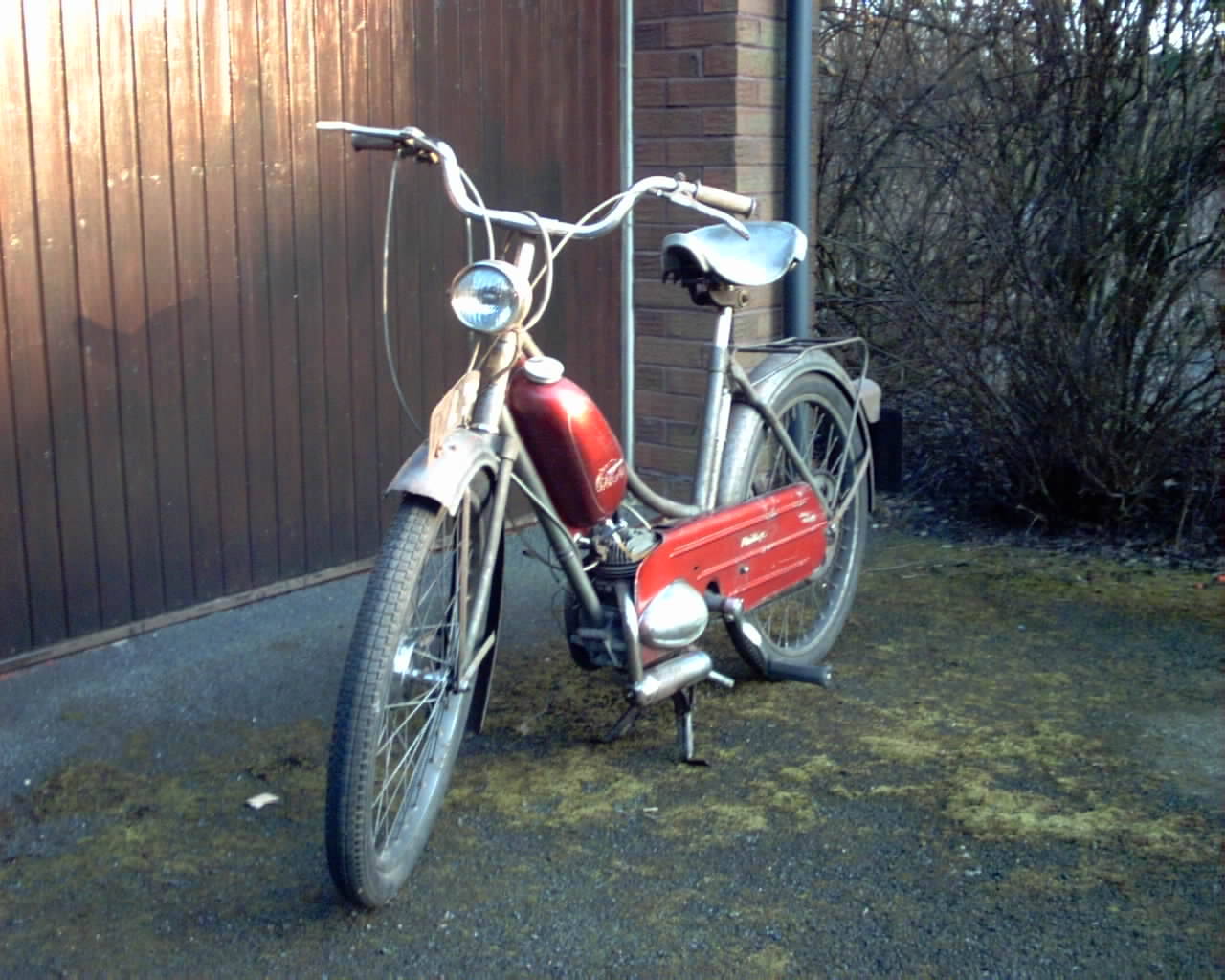
1960 Phillips Panda Mark 1 (P40)

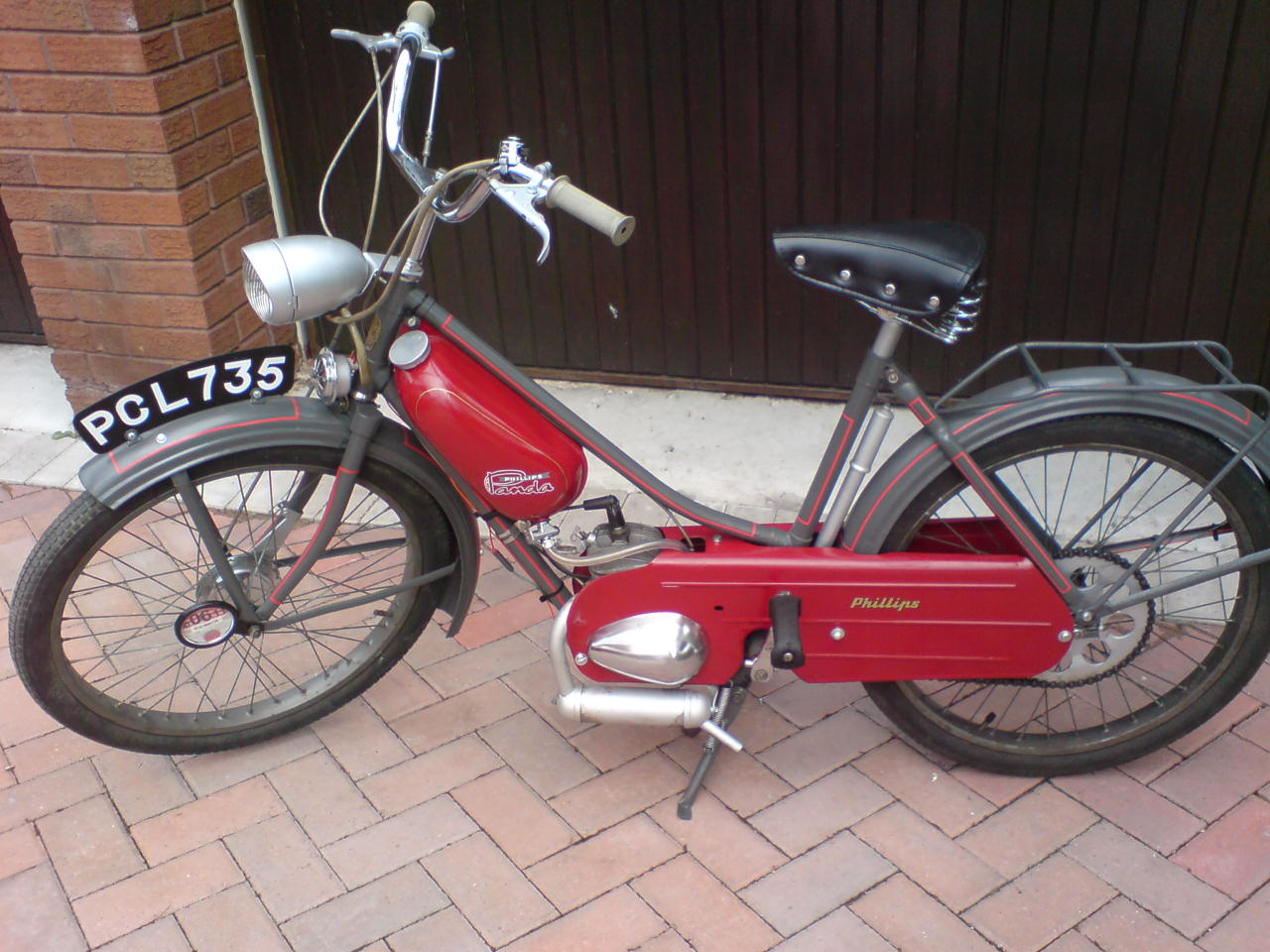
1960 Mark 1 Phillips Panda

Phillips Cycles Ltd. was a British bicycle manufacturer based in Smethwick near Birmingham, England. Its history began early in the 20th century and ended in the 1980s by which time it had become part of Raleigh Industries, itself a part of the Tube Investments group. For a number of years, the company was the second-largest bicycle producer in Britain, after Raleigh. The company motto, which was carried on all its badges, was "Renowned the World Over". The "Phillips" brand is still used around the world, especially in China and the Far East, having been licensed by Raleigh. In India it was produced from Madras presently called Chennai.

== Products ==
The company produced millions of bicycles, many of which were exported, and also manufactured several mopeds. These mopeds included the 'Panda' and 'Gadabout' models. The earliest of these machines (circa 1958 to 1962) were all produced in the United Kingdom except for the German 'Rex' engines but later models (Panda Mk 3 and Gadabout) were licensed versions of the Mobylette moped made by Motobécane of France.

== Prototypes ==
In 1956, Phillips unveiled the world's first titanium bicycle frame. Unlike modern titanium components, pure titanium was used as opposed to alloys.
