= Beardmore Precision Motorcycles =

Beardmore Precision

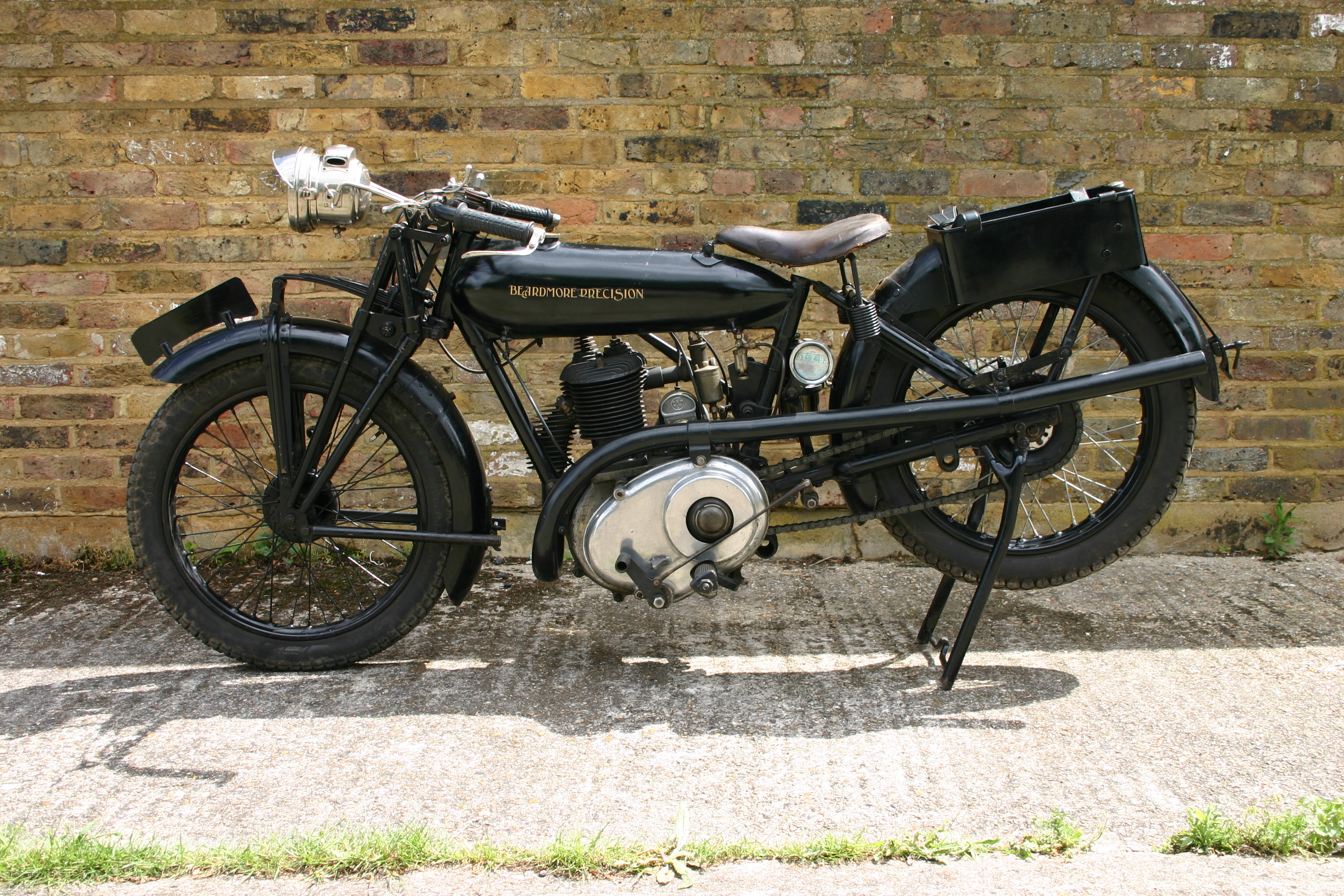
- Industry: manufacturing and engineering
- Founded: 1914
- Defunct: 1930
- Fate: Sold
- Successor: James Cycle Co
- Headquarters: Birmingham and Glasgow
- Products: motorcycles

Beardmore Precision Motorcycles was a British motorcycle manufacturer formed in 1919 when the engine manufacturer F. E. Baker Ltd, who produced motorcycle and cyclecar engines under the 'Precision' trademark before World War I, entered into an arrangement with the large shipbuilding and engineering company William Beardmore and Company.

== History ==
F. E. Baker Ltd had developed a substantial business making motorcycle and cyclecar engines supplied solely to manufacturers of completed vehicles. The engines were predominantly single and V-twin 4-strokes, with air or water cooling, though just before the war they had added a 2-stroke to their engine line-up. They also had a thriving export business, especially to Australia. During World War I production halted, and many of the small producers of motorcycles and cyclecars had ceased to exist, and after the war the company was faced with financing a restart.

In 1919 F. E. Baker Ltd entered into an arrangement with William Beardmore and Company, a large Scottish engineering and shipbuilding company based in Glasgow and between 1921 and 1924 Beardmore produced motorcycles under the name "Beardmore Precision". The first motorcycle produced was a 350 cc two-stroke featuring leaf-spring suspension front and rear and was followed by a range of motorcycles from 250 cc to 600 cc.

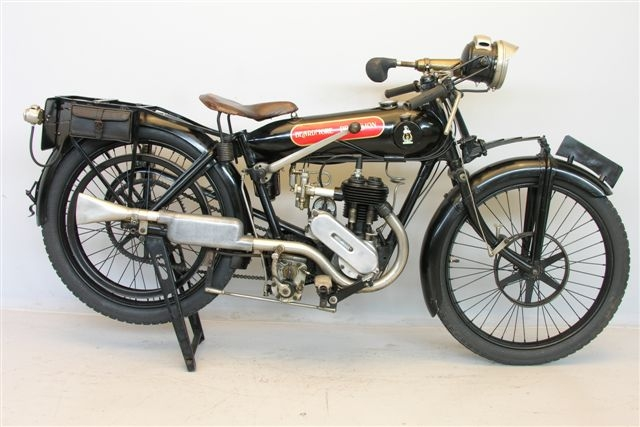
Beardmore Precision 350 cc 1923

After 1924 Baker regained the rights and set up his own company to continue production with Villiers engines of between 147 and 342 cc in Alvechurch Road, Birmingham. The company was eventually sold to the James Cycle Co in 1930. Frank Baker became a James employee and they used his designs well into the 1930s.

== Models ==
Model	Year	Notes
Beardmore Precision 350 cc	1921	Two-stroke
Beardmore Precision 250 cc	1924	
Beardmore Precision 500 cc	1925	Unit construction engine with leaf sprung suspension and a fuel tank integral to the frame.

== See also ==
- William Beardmore and Company
- London Motorcycle Museum
