= Ivy (motorcycles) =

British motorcycle manufacturer

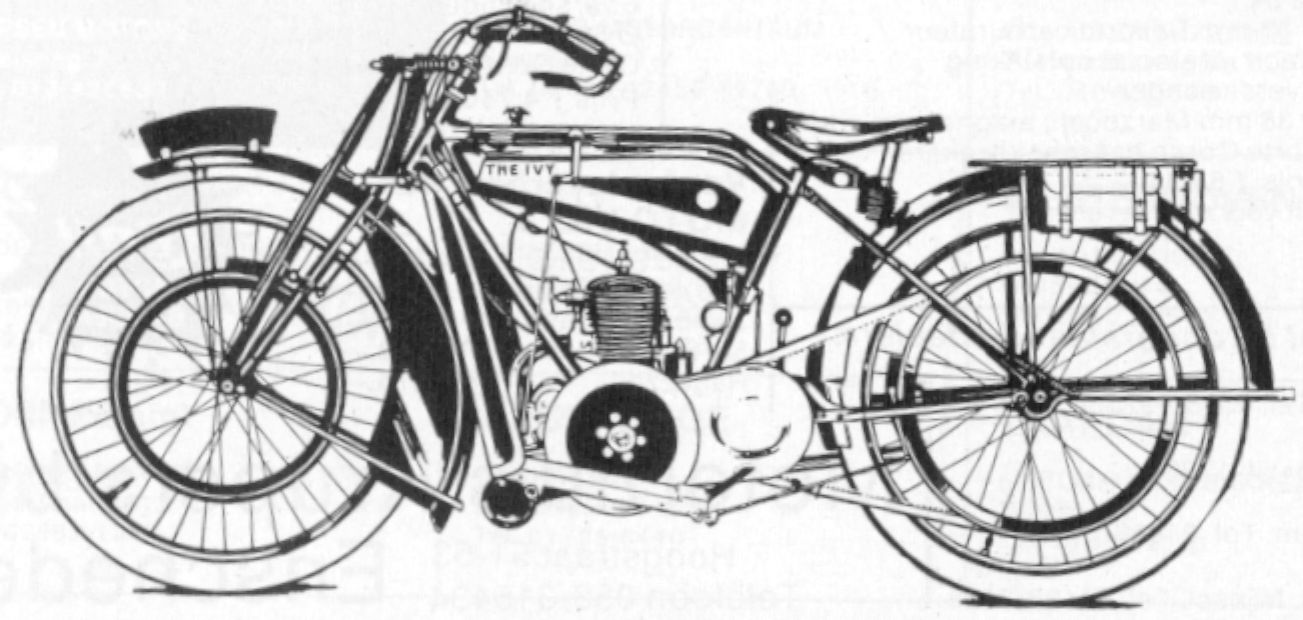

Ivy was a motorcycle manufacturer between 1907 and 1934 in Birmingham, England. It was run by various brothers from the Newman family. Ivy built about 6,000 motorcycles of various models. Most used two-stroke engines made by either J.A.P. or Precision, but there were also 225cc and 296cc engines designed and manufactured by Ivy. The company also made its own suspension forks, carburettors and sidecars.

The company was heavily involved in motorcycle racing, with several of the Newman brothers entering races themselves. The race bikes were kept as standard wherever possible to demonstrate the build quality and specification of the production machines. The Newman brothers believed that this was the best way to prove their designs and advertise their products. H. C. Newman was especially successful, winning many local events and finishing well in the Isle of Man TT races several times.

== Models ==
Various different models were made during the company's existence. These included:

- Ivyette: This had a 2 ¼ horsepower Valveless 224 cc two-stroke Ivy engine.

Designed to be a cheap and reliable vehicle for getting around town. Powered by the Ivy engine.

- Model C: This had a 2 ½ horsepower Precision engine. A version of this model was also sold as the Model E, which had a 2 ¾ horsepower engine.
- Model D: This was available with a wide range of engines including:
  - 3 ½ Hp single cylinder Precision engine (also a special TT version with 3 ¾ Hp which is claimed to be the first single-cylinder machine to achieve a speed of 60 miles per hour (97 km/h) with a sidecar).
  - 4 ½ Hp twin cylinder Precision engine.
  - 5 Hp twin cylinder JAP engine
  - 6 Hp twin cylinder Precision or JAP engine
  - A ladies' version of the model D was also available with a lower crossbar.
- 1924 Models: These were available with 349cc and 297cc single-cylinder SV engines, Sturmey Archer gearbox, Dunlop 26 x 2 1/2 cord tyres and mechanical oiling (as opposed to a hand-operated pump).

- Ivy Side Car: broke 7 world records at Brooklands on 30 October 1913 when used with 3 ½ horsepower Ivy D.
- An H.C. Newman-designed 677cc V-twin was used in the first Martinsyde.
