= Sun (motorcycle) =

British bicycle, light motorcycle and scooter manufacturer

The Sun Cycle & Fittings Co. Ltd. was an English manufacturer of motorcycles, mopeds and bicycles. The company was based in Aston, Birmingham.

The company was founded as James Parkes & Son, a brass foundry producing lamp fittings and various other products. In 1885 the company started to manufacture frames and fittings for the bicycle trade.

In 1897, the company became The Sun Cycle & Fittings Company Limited, and around the same time began making its own bicycles. The first Sun motorcycle was produced in 1911. In the period before WW1 they used F. E. Baker Ltd 'Precision' engines.

The company was taken over by Tube Investments in 1958, and in 1961 the factory was closed and production moved to the Raleigh factory at Nottingham. The 'Sun' name was for some time used to badge Raleigh cycles that had been returned to the factory for rectification work.
