= Safran Landing Systems =

French landing gear manufacturer

- Type: Subsidiary
- Industry: Aerospace, Defence
- Founded: 2011; 15 years ago
- Headquarters: Vélizy, France
- Key people: François Bastin (CEO); Gilles Bouctot (COO)
- Products: Aircraft landing gear, wheels and brakes
- Revenue: €5.415 billion (2017)
- Operating income: €682 million
- Net income: €668 million
- Number of employees: 7,000
- Parent: Safran
- Website: www.safran-group.com/companies/safran-landing-systems

Safran Landing Systems, formerly Messier-Bugatti-Dowty, is the world's largest manufacturer of aircraft landing gear, and is involved in the design, development, manufacture and customer support of all types of aircraft landing gear, wheels and brakes. The company is a wholly owned subsidiary of Safran SA. It is based in Vélizy, France, and was founded in 2011.

The company can be traced to the establishment of a 50/50 joint venture in 1995 between France's Messier and the United Kingdom's Dowty Group, then owned by TI Group. Messier-Dowty was purchased outright from TI Group by the SNECMA group in 1998. The 2005 merger of SAGEM and SNECMA made Messier-Dowty part of the new Safran company. In May 2011, Messier-Bugatti-Dowty was formed through the merger of three Safran subsidiaries: Messier-Dowty, Messier-Bugatti and Messier Services. In May 2016, Messier-Bugatti-Dowty became Safran Landing Systems.

Safran Landing Systems operates a number of sites across the globe, in Asia, Europe, Canada, Mexico and the United States; workshare is divided between these locations, each one typically specialising in an aspect of landing gear design, manufacture and support. Its main headquarters is located in Vélizy, outside Paris. The company's projects are divided into two business units: Airbus & European Programs and Boeing & North American Programs.

== History ==
The origins of the company dates back to the formation of a 50/50 joint venture between the France-based Messier and the United Kingdom-based Dowty Group, then owned by TI Group, in 1995. That same year, the company announced its intentions to develop a universal landing gear platform that would be shared between multiple airliners; the aim of such commonality was a 20-40% reduction in the cost of the landing gear to manufacturers and end customers. According to Tony Edwards, the chief executive and chairman of the merged entity, while acknowledging the new entity had been experiencing some difficulties due to a lack of preparation, he regarded it as being: "a successful example of European integration that works". During early 1998, Messier-Dowty was purchased outright from TI Group by the SNECMA group.

During 1998, the company decided to invest $30 million in the creation of a new US subsidiary, known as A-Carb, to produce carbon brakes for both Airbus and Boeing airliners. That same year, Messier-Dowty and Messier Bugatti teamed up to form a new SNECMA-held subsidiary, Messier Services, which specialised in delivering the maintenance of both landing gear systems and brake units. During late 1998, Messier-Dowty announced that, to support future product development and testing efforts, it was planning to construct the world's largest landing gear drop test rig at its facility in Toulouse, France.

In 1999, Messier-Dowty announced plans to create a design office in Seattle, America, as part of an effort to work closely with Boeing on both its civil and military programmes. That same year, it was announced that a new manufacturing facility would be established in Singapore as a joint venture between Singapore Aerospace Manufacturing and Messier-Dowty. In June 2001, Messier-Dowty was awarded a $2.9 million contract for research into the field of low-noise landing gear; this deal was a part of the SILENCE(R) initiative, a four-year European effort launched to improve the environmental qualities of commercial aircraft. During 2002, the company opened the world's largest landing gear test centre in Gloucester, England.

In February 2004, Messier-Dowty officially opened its new Chinese production facility in the city of Suzhou; it was the first Chinese operation to be wholly owned by a SNECMA company. Around this period, the company won several key bids; in February, it secured a deal to provide the main landing gear for the Airbus A400M; in March, it was appointed to supply both the main and nose gear of the Boeing 787, as well as the integrated landing gear of the Sukhoi Superjet 100 in October 2003. In 2010, Messier-Dowty became the first company in the world to incorporate composite braces onto the main landing gear of a commercial aircraft, this being the Boeing 787.

The 2005 merger of SAGEM and SNECMA made Messier-Dowty part of the new Safran company. During December 2007, Airbus announced that Messier-Dowty had been confirmed as the supplier for the main landing gear of the upcoming Airbus A350 XWB; under this arrangement, it was responsible for the design, development, qualification testing, manufacturing and in-service support of the main gear. In the following year, the firm invested around C$2 million in the introduction of robotic surface finishing of its landing gear outer fittings at its plant in Mirabel, Quebec, Canada.

In March 2010, Messier-Dowty opened a new undercarriage components factory in Querétaro, Mexico. The facility was part of a larger deal between Safran and the local Mexican government; expansion into the production of increasingly advanced components was seen at the time as being highly likely.

In May 2011, Messier-Bugatti-Dowty was formed through the merger of three Safran subsidiaries: Messier-Dowty, Messier-Bugatti and Messier Services. During 2014, the firm became the sole owner of French joint-venture maintenance company Hydrep after acquiring the other 50% share formerly held by Sabena Technics. In May 2016, Messier-Bugatti-Dowty became Safran Landing Systems.

== Operations ==
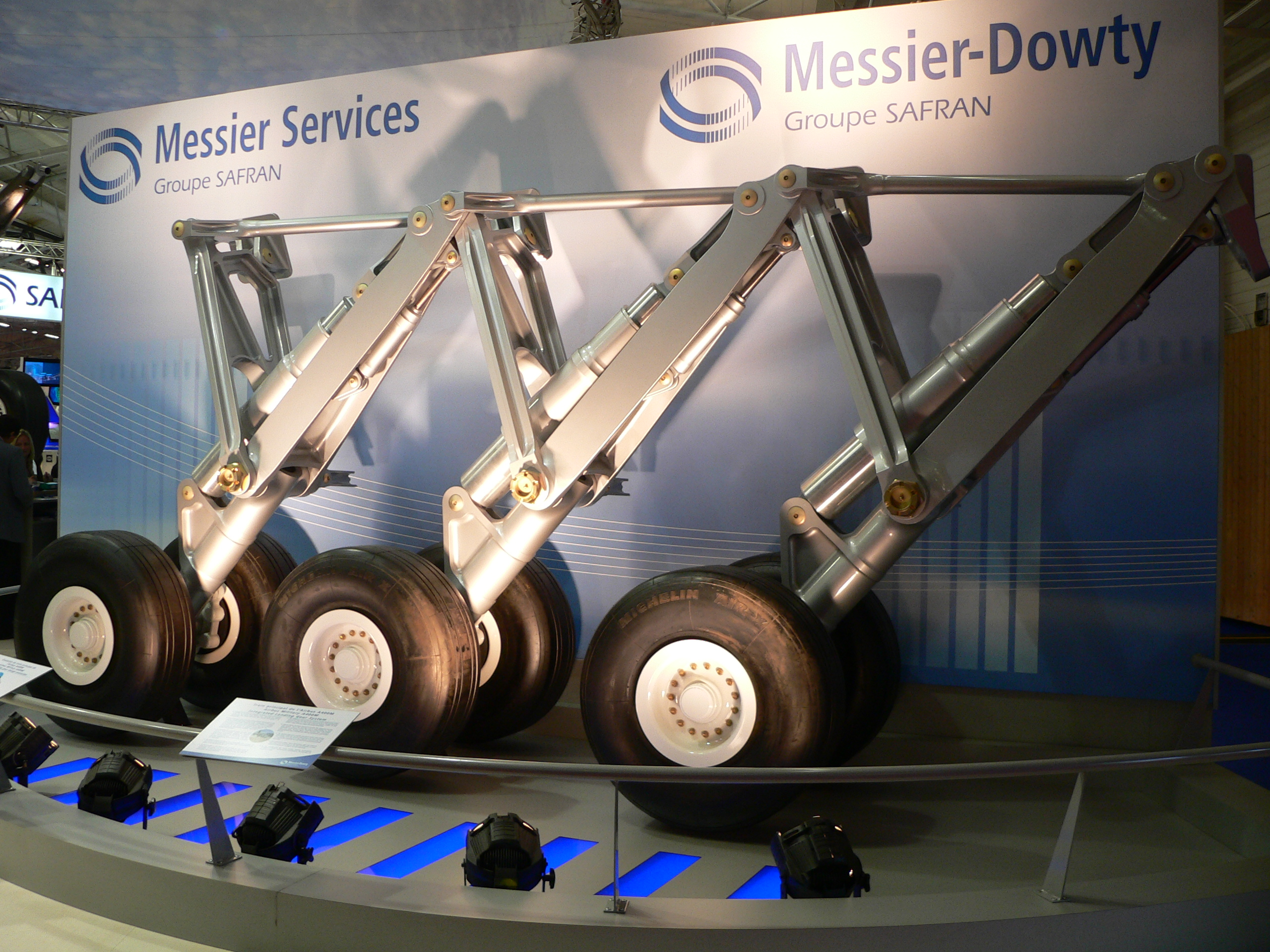
Landing gear for the Airbus A400M

Safran Landing Systems has operational sites across the globe. The sites are located in Asia (Singapore, Seremban, Suzhou), Europe (Vélizy, Molsheim, Bidos, Villeurbanne, Gloucester, Feyzin), Canada (Ajax, Montreal), Mexico (Querétaro) and United States (Walton, Seattle). The main headquarters is located in Vélizy, outside Paris. Each site is responsible for certain aspects of landing gear design, manufacture and support.

- Bidos: responsible for the production of large components (bogies, main fittings, integral axles) for large commercial, business, commuter aircraft and helicopter gears.
- Gloucester: Design, research and systems integration together with manufacturing capability. This site is focused on the manufacture of complex major structural components such as main fittings and bogies for large commercial aircraft together with main fittings and large components for military and commuter aircraft platforms. The Gloucester site is also home to one of the largest landing gear test facilities in the western world, capable of the structural and systems testing of large commercial landing gears.
- Molsheim: wheels manufacturing, special processing, assembly equipment and MRO
- Montreal: manufacturing, heat treatment, special processing and assembly equipment
- Querétaro: manufacturing of major landing gear components for: A320 main landing gear fitting, A330 main landing gear bogie beam and B787 nose landing gear inner cylinder.
- Ajax, Ontario: design and development of fully integrated landing gear systems. It also focuses on ancillary systems such as steering control, landing gear control and indication, emergency control, brake control, wheels, brakes, tires, door mechanisms and electrical harnesses. This site is the final assembly area where landing gear systems for many aircraft are fully assembled and tested before shipping to the customer. It has test facilities for development and certification.
- Seattle: engineering and manufacturing site, focusing on the Boeing 787. The office provides Engineering and Program support to the 787 program, while the manufacturing facility final-assembles the 787 Main Landing Gears.
- Seremban: Carbon brake manufacturing
- Suzhou: manufacturing landing gear components of medium size for business and regional jet programs
- Singapore: procurement and customer support base and MRO for the Asia Pacific region
- Villeurbanne: Carbon brake manufacturing
- Walton: Carbon brake and wheel manufacturing
- Feyzin : Carbon brake manufacturing

== See also ==
- George Dowty
- Dowty Group
