= Christopher Lewinton =

British-American businessperson (1932–2023)

Sir Christopher Lewinton (6 January 1932 – 1 October 2023) was a British-American businessman.

== Early life and education ==
Lewinton was born in Kentish Town, London, to Joseph and Elizabeth Lewinton. During World War II, the family, including his sister Pamela, relocated to West London. He attended Acton Technical College, focusing on maths and physics, and was a member of the Hayes Cricket Club.

In 1957, he married Jennifer Alcock and had two sons before their divorce in 1973. He later married Louise Head in 1979, becoming stepfather to her two children.

== Career ==
Lewinton started his career at Graviner, an engineering firm in Buckinghamshire that specialized in fire protection equipment for aircraft. While there, he pursued a Higher National Diploma in mechanical engineering. Lewinton served as a lieutenant in the Royal Electrical and Mechanical Engineers, with a posting in Egypt in 1953.

Subsequent to his military service, Lewinton joined Wilkinson Sword. He was tasked by Wilkinson Sword to oversee their disposable razor operation in the United States, leading to the establishment of a facility in New Jersey. During this tenure, he worked with sports agent Mark McCormack, which led to Wilkinson sponsoring athletes such as Arnold Palmer and Bjorn Borg. He also served on the advisory board of McCormack's firm, IMG, from 1975 to 1995.

In 1970, Lewinton was appointed chief executive officer (CEO) of Wilkinson Sword Group. Under his leadership, the company expanded its turnover from £30 million to £600 million. After Wilkinson's 1985 merger with Allegheny, Lewinton became TI's chief executive. He was knighted in 1993 for contributions to engineering. After Smiths Industries acquired TI in 2000, he took retirement. Later, he established CL Partners, managing various business initiatives, including a directorship at Camper and Nicholsons Marina Investments.
