= TI Group =

Holding company based in Oxfordshire

- Type: Public
- Industry: Engineering
- Founded: 1919
- Defunct: 2000
- Fate: Acquired
- Successor: Smiths Group
- Headquarters: Abingdon, Oxfordshire, United Kingdom
- Key people: Lord Plowden (Chairman)
- Website: www.tigroup.com

TI Group plc (formerly "Tube Investments") was a holding company for specialised engineering companies. It was based in Abingdon, Oxfordshire and was listed on the London Stock Exchange, at one point being a constituent of the FTSE 100 Index.

The company was originally registered as Tube Investments in 1919, combining the seamless steel tube businesses of various companies. In 1949, the company established TI Cycles of India as a joint venture with the Murugappa family. During 1956, it created the subsidiary British Cycle Corporation, consisting of Armstrong, Norman Cycles, Sun Cycles, Phillips Cycles, Hercules Cycles, and merged it with Raleigh Industries. During the 1980s, the company acquired Alfred Herbert Ltd, Houdaille, and Armco Inc.'s European Tubing business. In 1987, Raleigh was sold to Derby International while Creda was sold to GEC.

During 1992, TI Group acquired Dowty Group, after which the business underwent heavy restructuring, making 1,500 former Dowty employees redundant and quickly disposing of seven ex-Dowty Group companies via a management buyout that resulted in the creation of Ultra Electronics. In 1994, TI Group transferred the Dowty landing gear business into a joint venture that it formed with SNECMA, which became known as Messier-Dowty. During late 1998, TI Group opted to sell its stake in Messier-Dowty. Throughout the late 1990s, the group acquired numerous other companies, including Technoflow Tube Systems, Bundy Asia Pacific, S&H Fabricating and Engineering, Kenmore Italiana, Walbro Corporation, and Marwal. On 4 December 2000, Smiths Industries merged with TI Group.

== History ==
The company was registered as Tube Investments in 1919, combining the seamless steel tube businesses of Tubes Ltd, New Credenda Tube (later known as Creda), Simplex and Accles & Pollock. Reynolds Tube joined the group in 1928.

Ivan Stedeford joined the company in 1928; he became chief executive in 1935, and chairman in 1944. The company benefitted greatly from the expansion of Britain's aviation sector, particularly amid the Second World War.

In 1946, the company bought Swallow Coachbuilding Co. (1935) Ltd. and Hercules Cycles. In 1949, the company established TI Cycles of India as a joint venture with the Murugappa family. The British Cycle Corporation subsidiary was formed in 1956, and consisted of Armstrong, Norman Cycles, Sun Cycles, Phillips Cycles and Hercules Cycles (no connection with the German Hercules company). TI subsidiary Swallow Coachbuilding Co. constructed the Swallow Doretti sports car in 1954 and 1955. The 'Aluminium War' from 1958 to 1959 was a fierce, and ultimately successful, battle fought by the firm to acquire British Aluminium.

Raleigh Industries were acquired in 1960, bringing the Raleigh owned brands BSA Cycles, Humber, Triumph, Rudge, New Hudson, Sunbeam Three Spires and J. B. Brooks. During 1963, the company bought kettle manufacturers Russell Hobbs in 1963; that same year, Sir Ivan Stedeford retired as chairman and chief executive officer and became life president.

The group bought Alfred Herbert Ltd in 1982. In 1986, Tube Investments acquired Houdaille, parent of John Crane and other industrial companies from Kohlberg Kravis Roberts; the non Crane divisions were sold back to KKR as IDEX. Tube Investments acquired Armco Inc.'s European Tubing business – Fulton (UK) and Bundy Corporation (USA) in 1987; Raleigh was sold that year to Derby International and Creda to GEC.

TI Group bought Huron Products Industries (USA) in 1991, and Dowty Group in 1992, Reportedly, Dowty had been regarded by TI's chairman, Sir Christopher Lewinton, as his number-one target and had made substantial preparations towards its acquisition, although the bid was not regarded as being a hostile one despite Dowty's board initially having spurned the proposition. Following the completion of the Dowty acquisition, TI Group became the second largest engineering concern in the UK.

Considerable restructuring of the company occurred during the early-to-mid 1990s. By August 1993, TI Group had made 1,500 of ex-Dowty workforce redundant since the acquisition, equivalent to 20 per cent of the total workforce; this move was reportedly a consequence of the unit's performance having been beneath expectations. During 1993, TI Group decided to dispose of seven former Dowty Group companies engaged in the manufacture of electronic equipment; this was achieved in the form of a management buyout that resulted in the creation of Ultra Electronics.

In 1994, TI Group transferred the Dowty landing gear business into a joint venture that it formed with SNECMA, which became known as Messier-Dowty. According to Tony Edwards, the chief executive and chairman of the merged entity, while acknowledging there having been some difficulties due to a lack of preparation, he regarded it as being: "a successful example of European integration that works". At one point, TI Group had ambitious to wholly own Messier-Dowty, however the French government made any such deal impossible. Accordingly, during late 1998, TI Group opted to sell its stake in Messier-Dowty, it thus became wholly owned by the French aerospace business Safran and subsequently renamed Safran Landing Systems.

During 1996, TI Group decided to sell Accles & Pollock to Hay Hall Group. Throughout the late 1990s, various companies were acquired by TI Group, including Technoflow Tube Systems (Germany), Bundy Asia Pacific, S&H Fabricating and Engineering (USA), Kenmore Italiana (Italy), Walbro Corporation (USA), and Marwal (France).

On 4 December 2000, Smiths Industries merged with TI Group. Shortly after the merger was completed, Smiths Group transferred its newly acquired automotive business into a separate corporate entity, creating TI Automotive, and promptly disposed of it.

== Operations ==
The three major divisions were:

- John Crane International, manufacturer of mechanical seals,
- Bundy Corporation, a tubing manufacturer and supplier to the refrigeration and automotive industries,
- Dowty Group, an aerospace company.

The group also owned TI Creda, a manufacturer of domestic cookers, and owned TI Chesterfield Cylinders, a manufacturer of pressurised gas cylinders for companies such as BOC and Air Products and Chemicals: the business was sold and the factory moved from Chesterfield to Sheffield.
