= List of car manufacturers of the United Kingdom =

This list is incomplete. You can help by adding correctly sourced information about other manufacturers.

== Major current marques ==
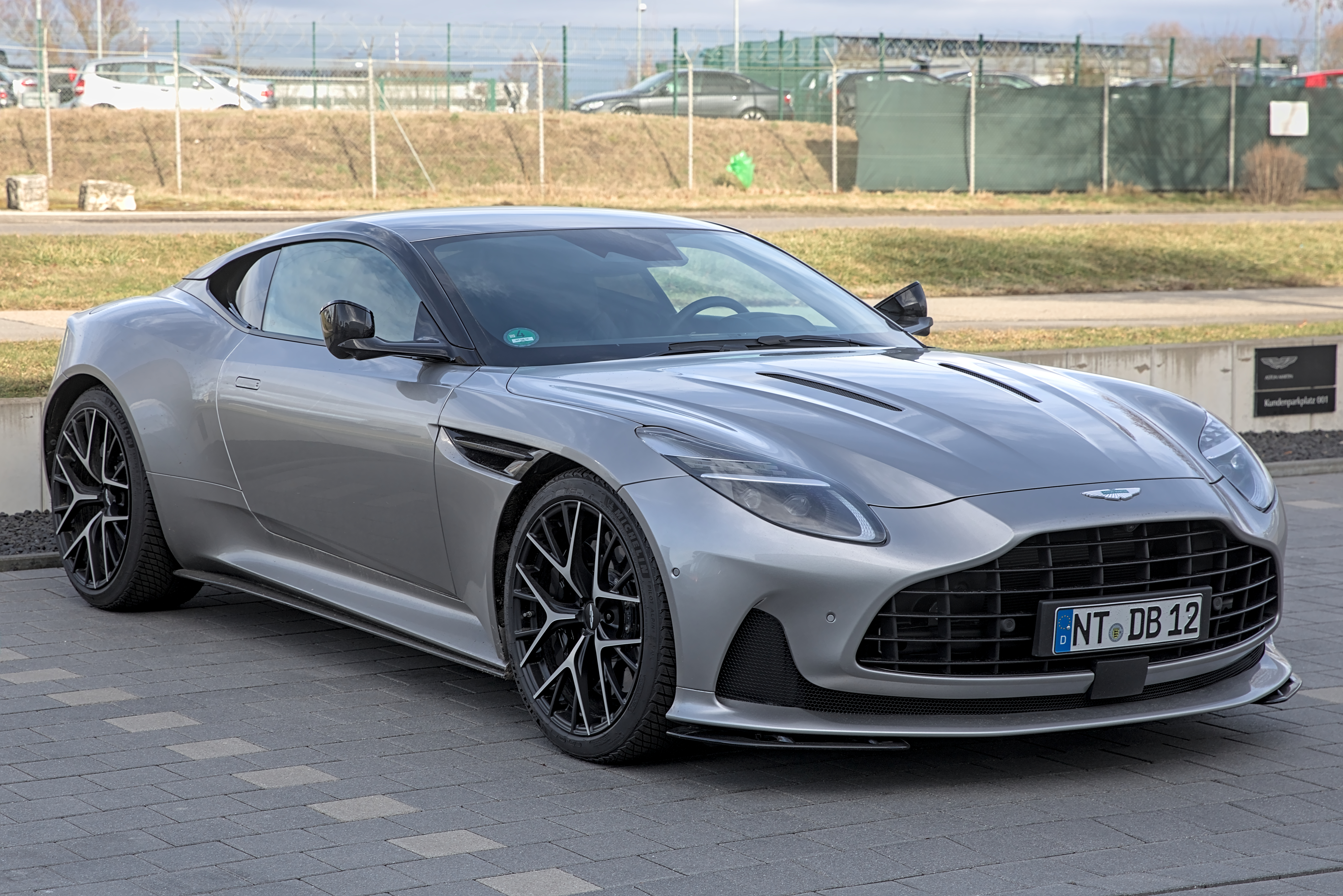
2024 Aston Martin DB12

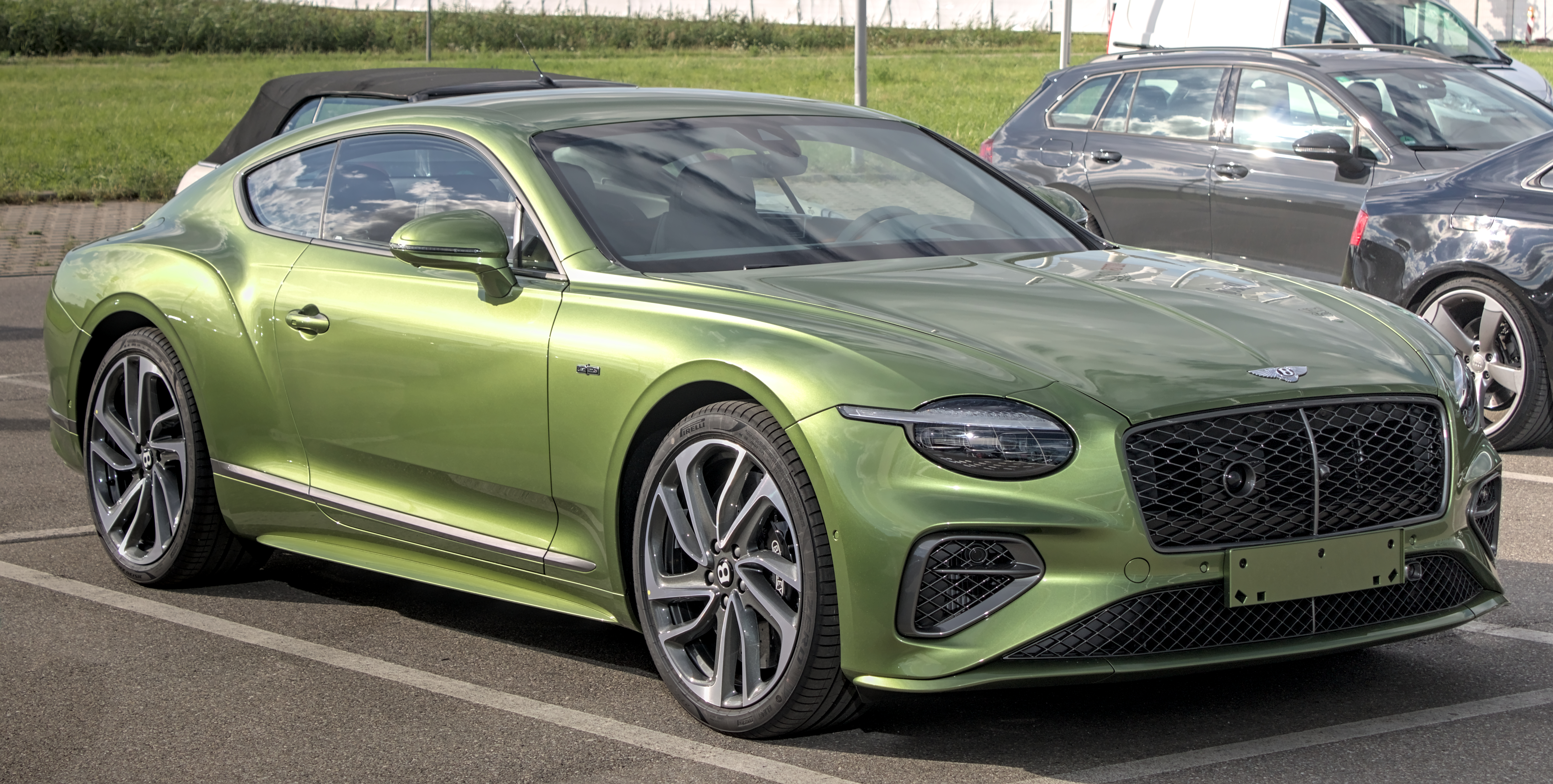
2025 Bentley Continental GT

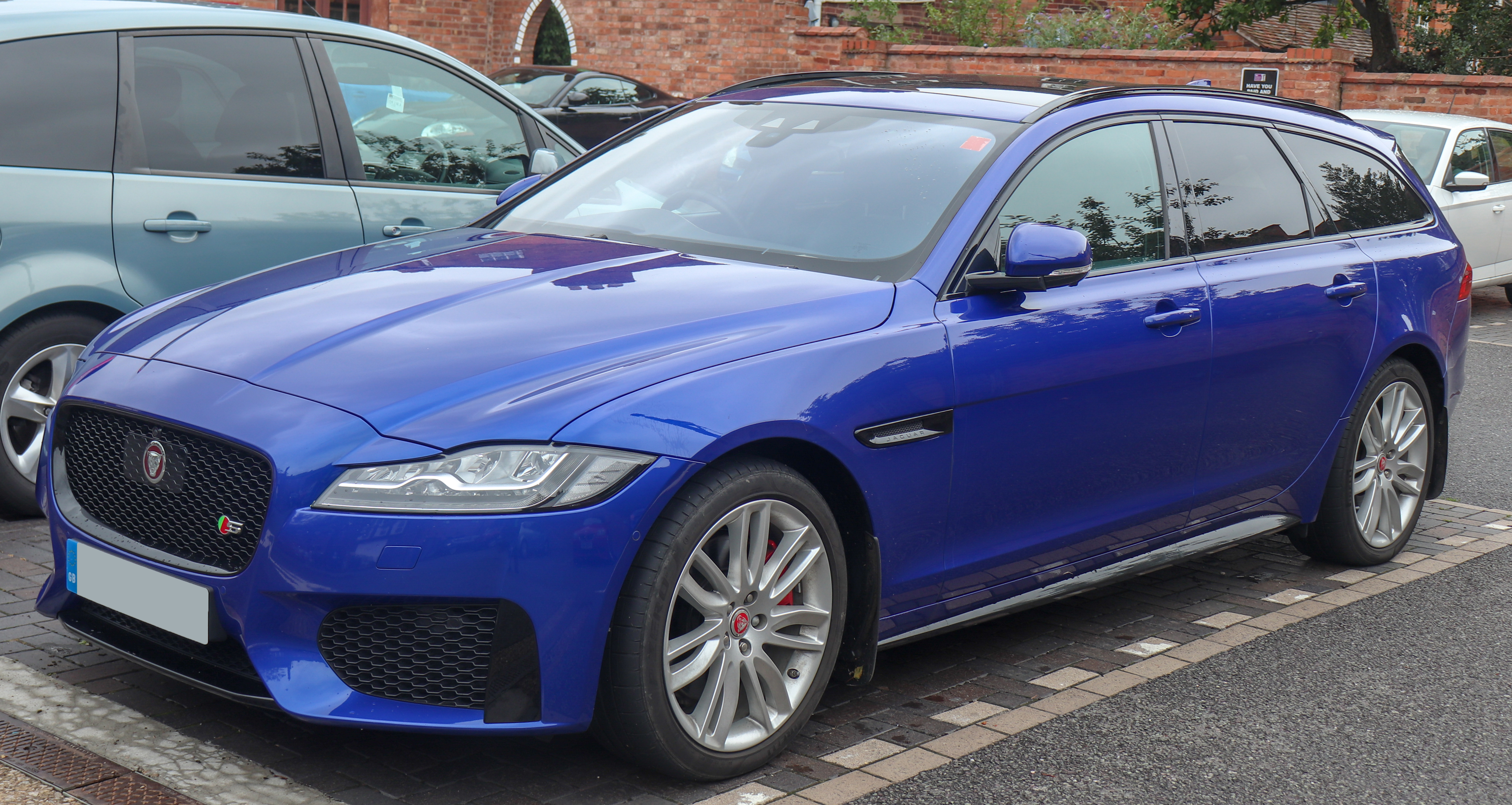
2018 Jaguar XF Sportbrake

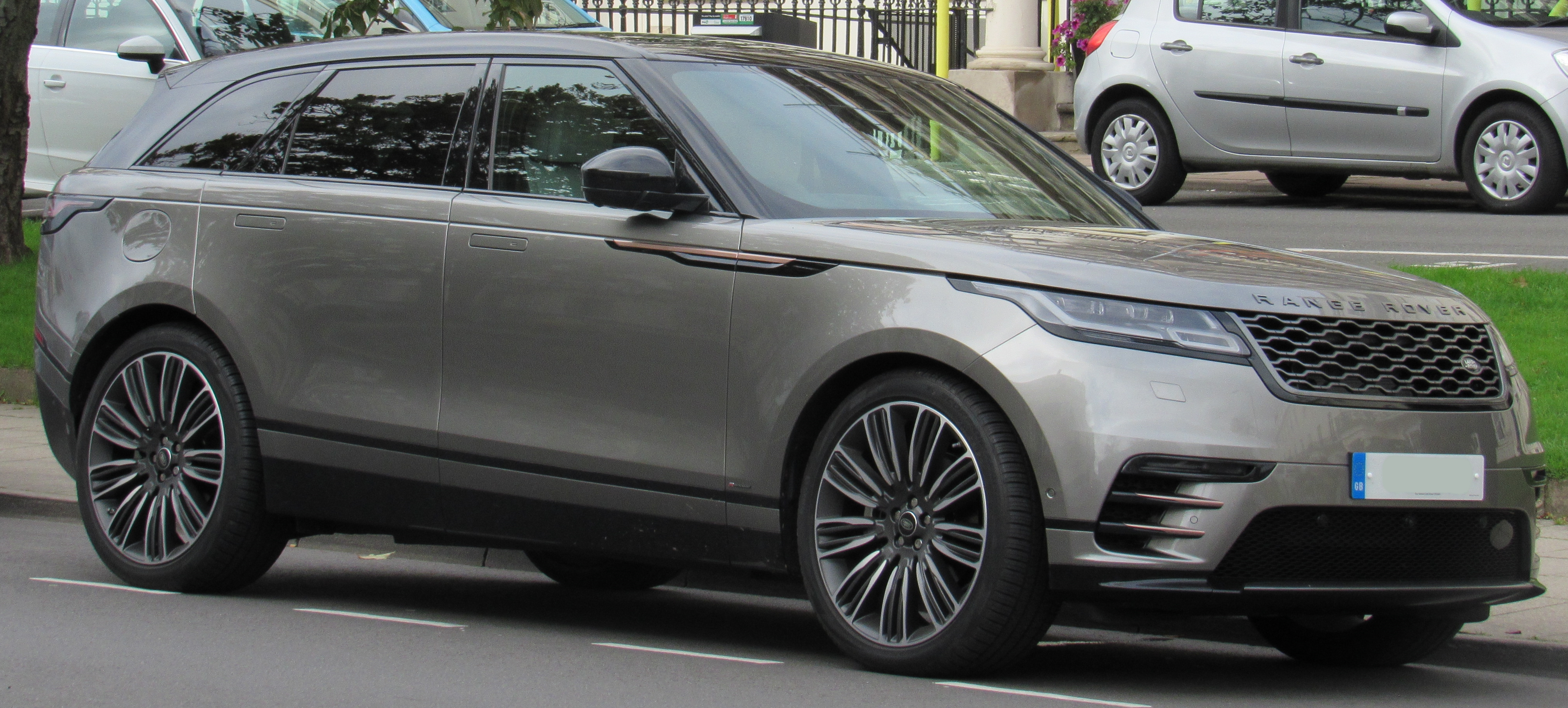
2017 Land Rover Range Rover Velar

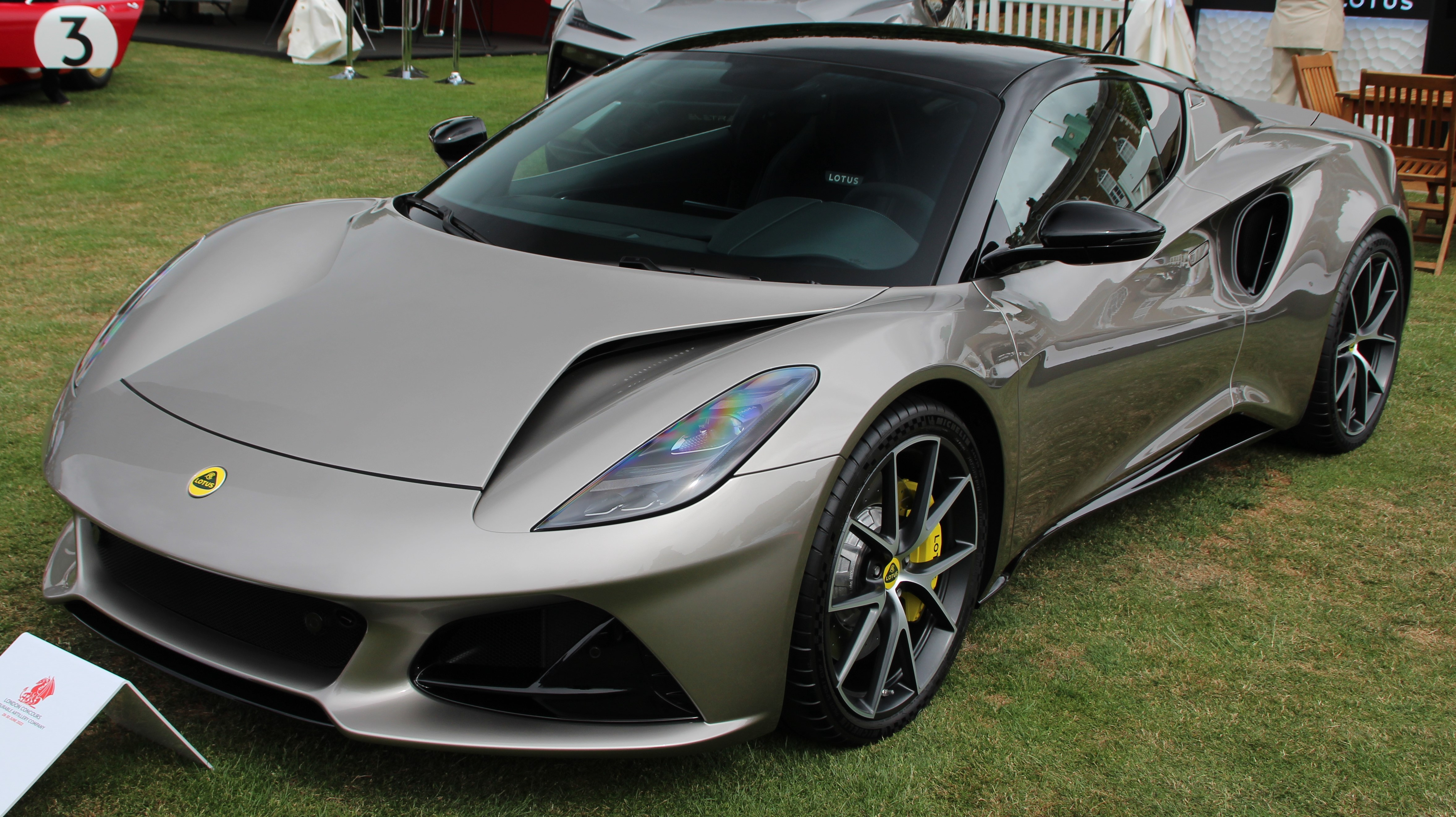
2022 Lotus Emira

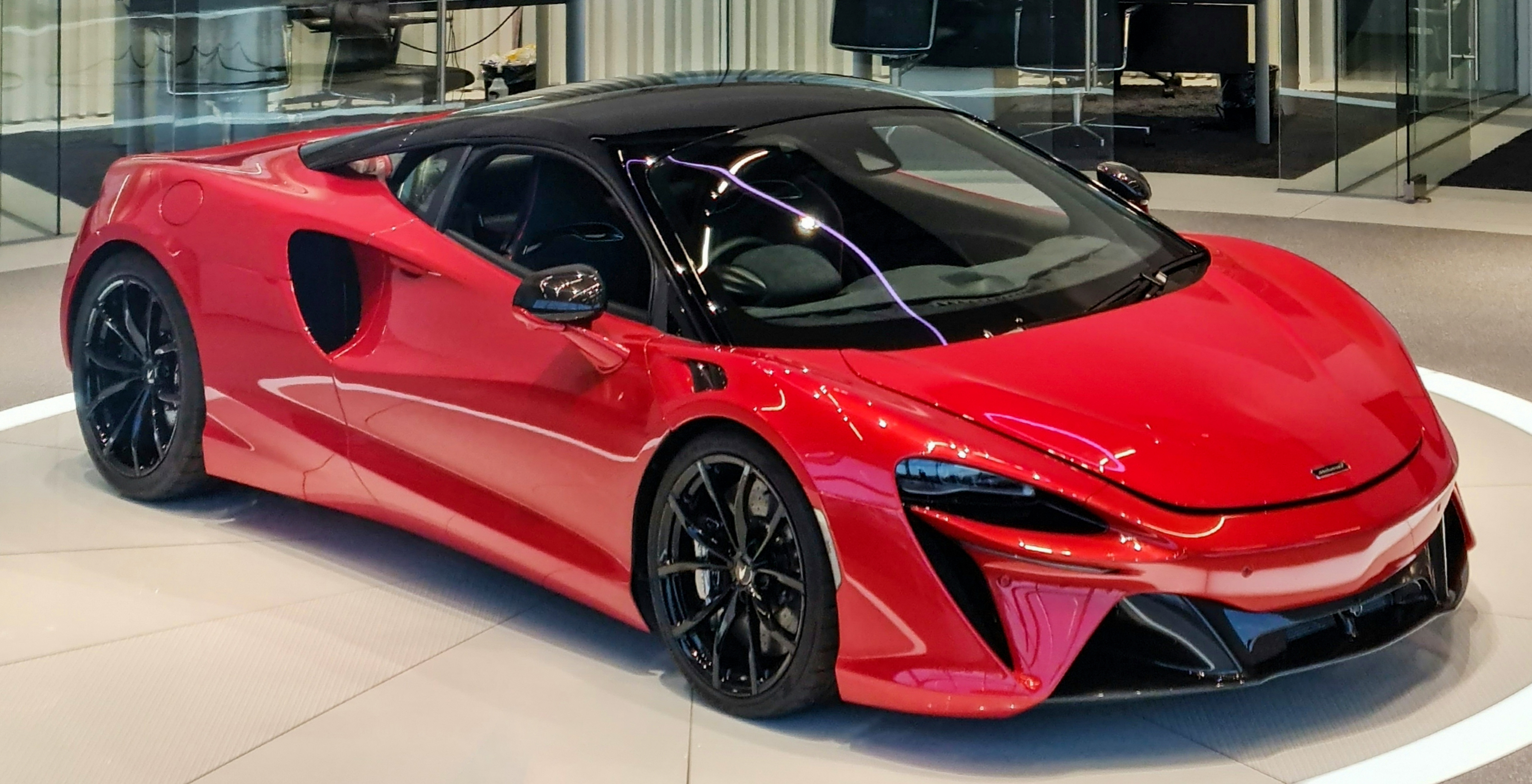
2021 McLaren Artura

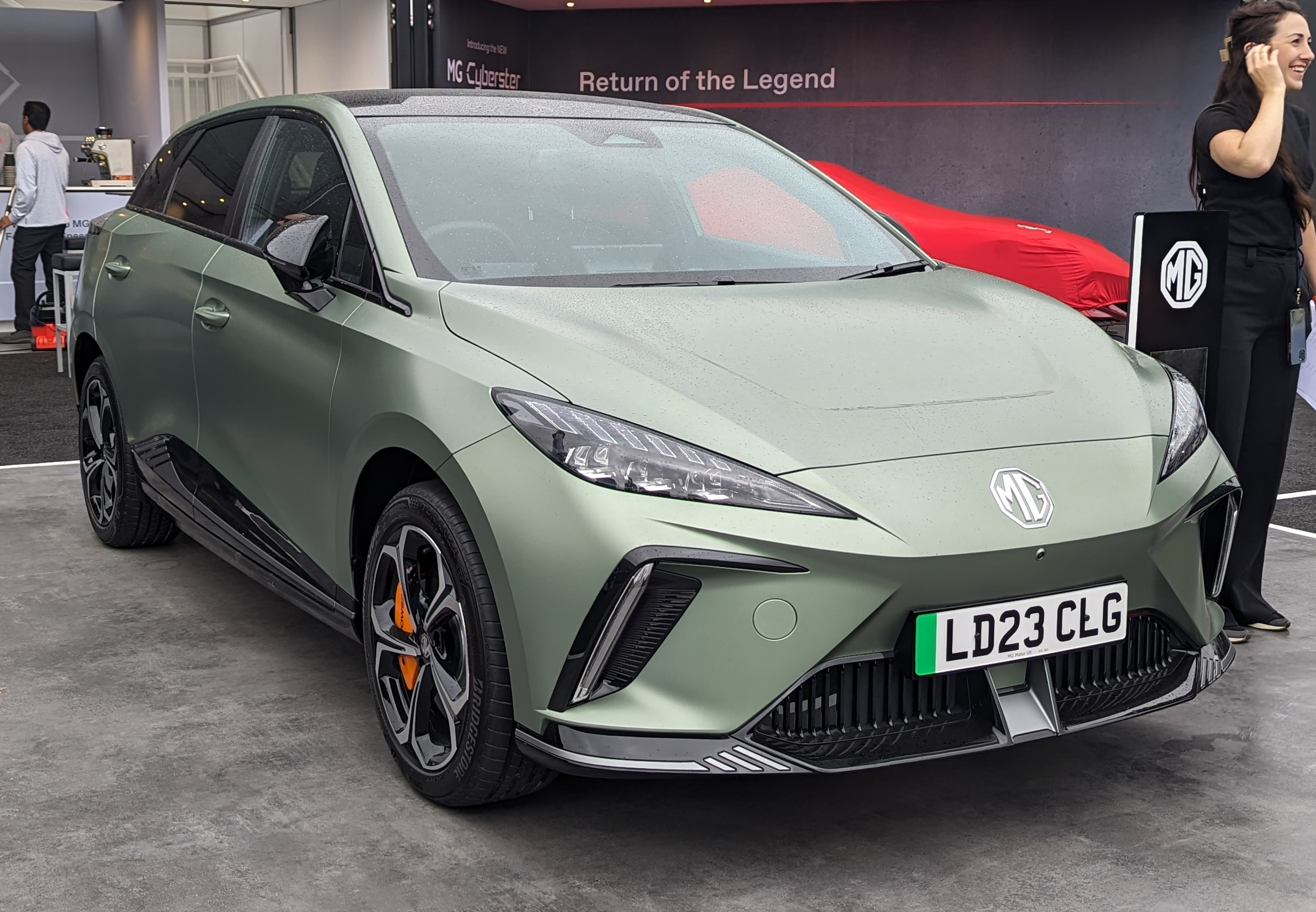
2023 MG4 EV XPower

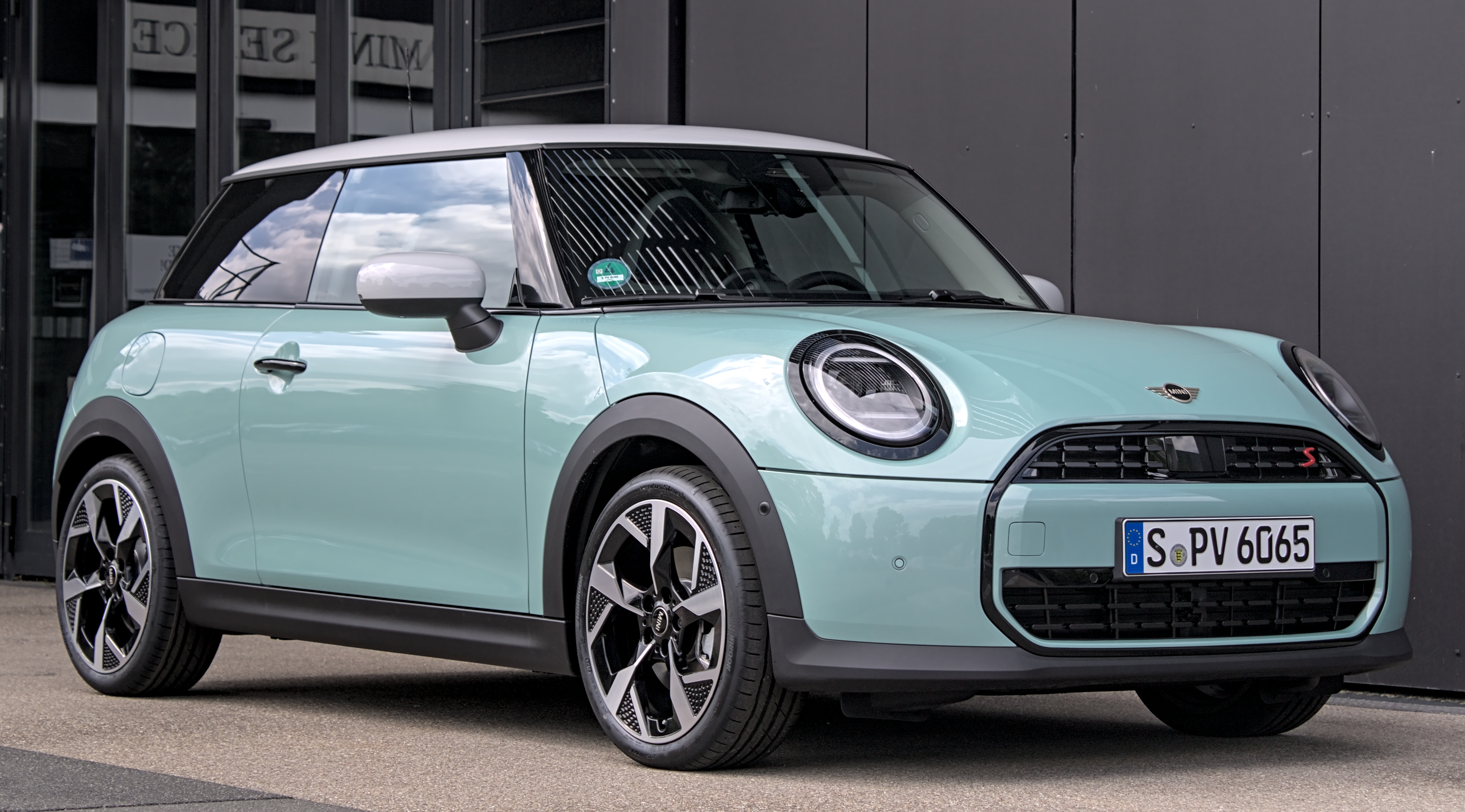
2025 Mini Hatch

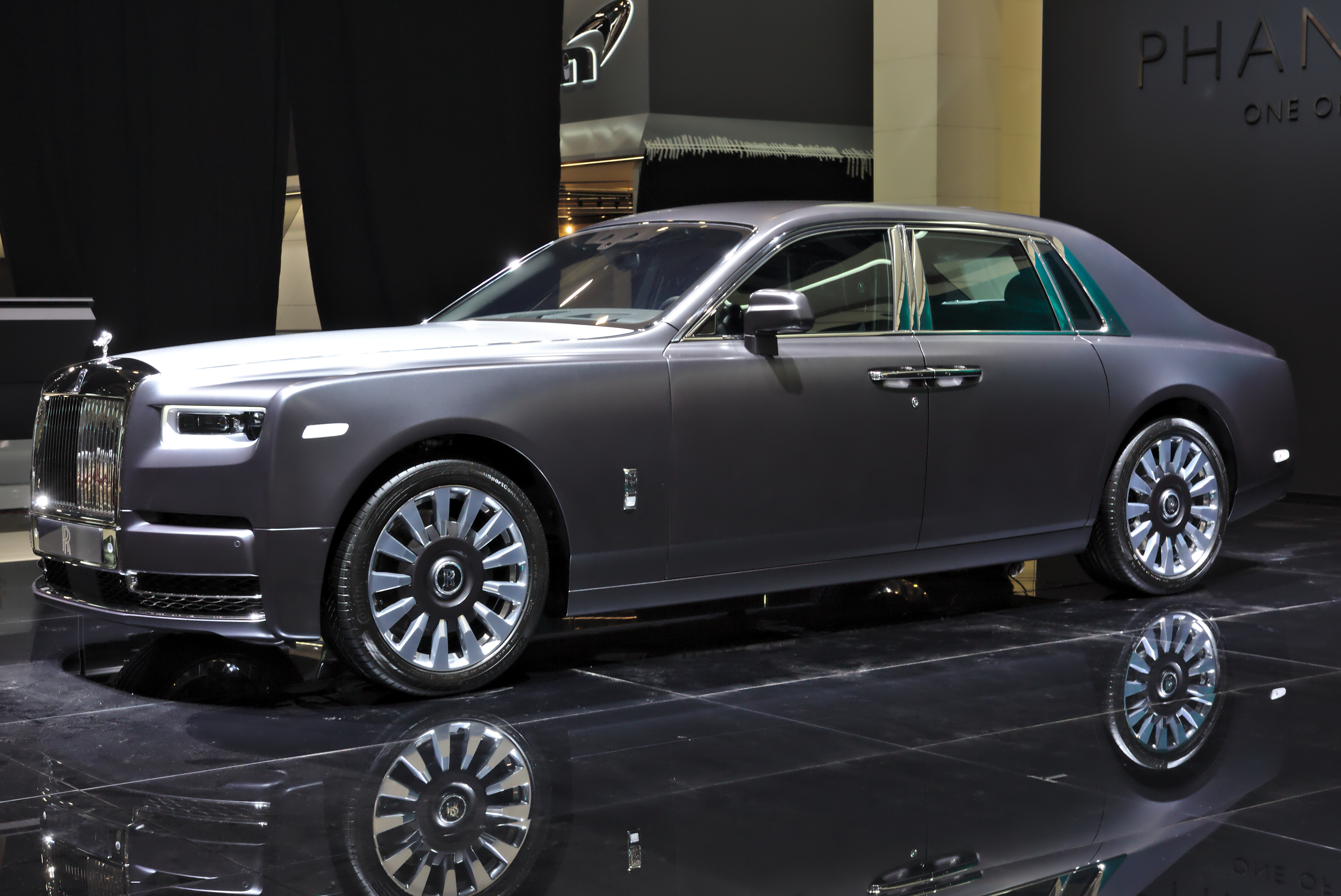
2018 Rolls-Royce Phantom VIII

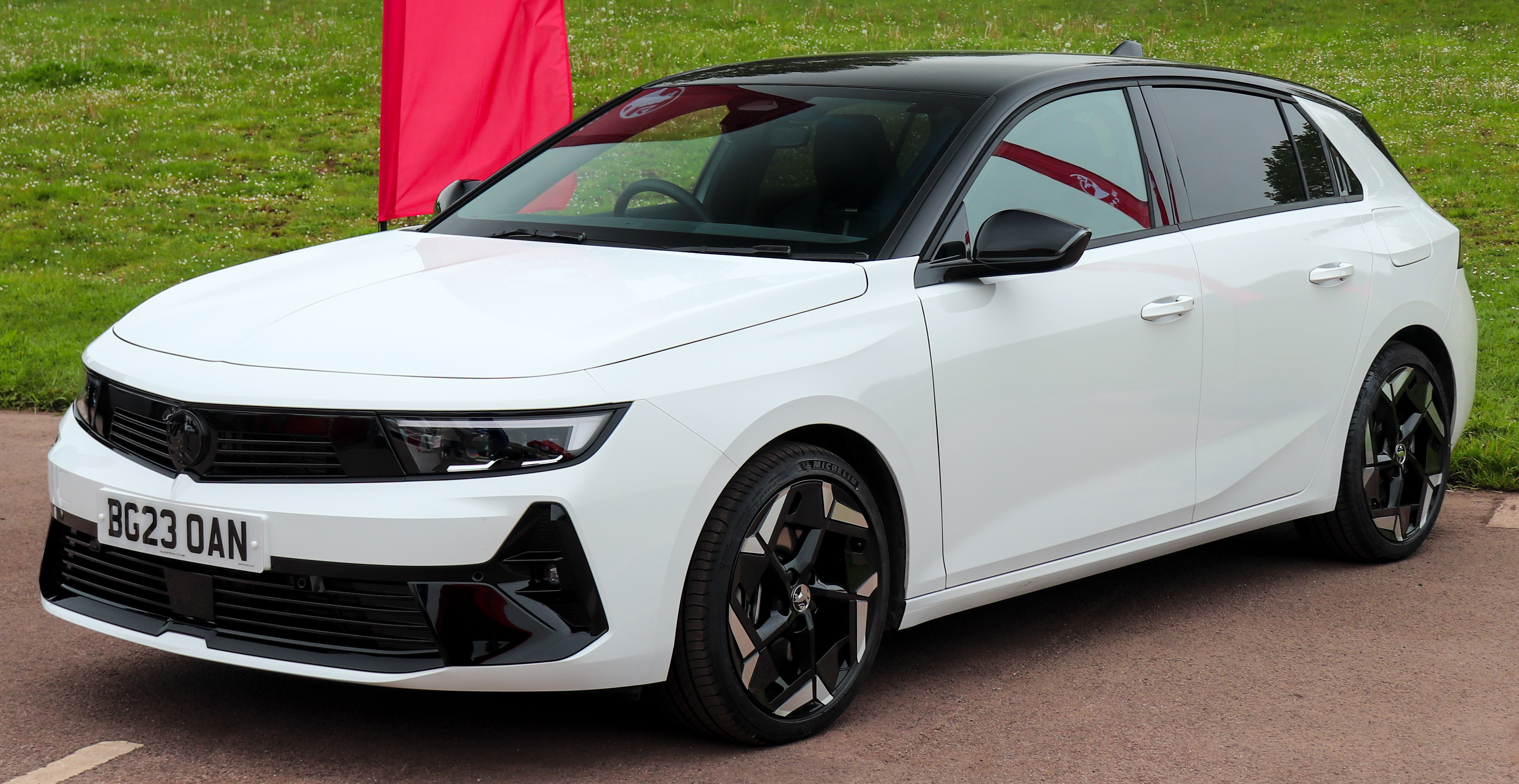
2023 Vauxhall Astra

Marque	Owner	Parent
Aston Martin (1913–present)	Aston Martin	Aston Martin Lagonda Global Holdings PLC
Bentley (1919–present)	Bentley Motors	Volkswagen AG
Jaguar (1935–present)	Jaguar Land Rover	Tata Motors Passenger Vehicles
Land Rover (1948–present)	Jaguar Land Rover	Tata Motors Passenger Vehicles
Lotus (1952–present)	Lotus Cars	Geely
McLaren (1985–present)	McLaren Automotive	CYVN Holdings
MG (1923–present)	MG Motor	SAIC Motor
Mini (1969–present)	BMW	BMW
Morgan (1910–present)	Morgan Motor Company	Investindustrial
Rolls-Royce (1904–present)	Rolls-Royce Motor Cars	BMW
Vauxhall (1903–present)	Vauxhall Motors	Stellantis

== Current manufacturers ==
A

- AC (1908–present)
- Action Automotive (2004–present)
- Aeon Sportscars (2000–present)
- AK Sportscars (1992–present)
- Alcraft Motor Company (2014–present)
- Allard (2012–present)
- Alvis (2012–present)
- AM Sportscars (1996–present)
- Arash (2006–present)
- Arkley Sportscars (1970–present)
- Ariel (1999–present)
- AS Motorsport (2007–present)
- Asquith Brothers (1912–present)
- Asquith Motors (1981–present)
- Aston Martin (1913–present)
- Atalanta Motors (2011–present)
- Austin Motor Company (2015–present)
- Automotive Systems Developments (1983–present)
- Autotrak (Cobretti) (1989–present)
- Autotune (Rishton) (1975–present)
- Alfaholics (2003–present)
- Analogue Automotive (1995–present)

B

- Beauford automobiles (1985–present)
- Bentley Motors (1919–present)
- Berkeley Sports Cars (2017–present)
- Blackjack Cars (1996–present)
- Blaze Motorsport (2007–present)
- Bounty (1999–present)
- Bowler Motors (1985–present)
- BRA (car brand) (1981–present)
- BAC (2009–present)
- BRM (1948–present)
- Brooke (1991–present)
- Buckland Cars (1988–present)
- Bugle (car brand) (1970–present)

C

- Caburn Engineering (1997–present)
- Caterham (1973–present)
- Chesil Motor Company (1991–present)
- Chevron Cars Ltd (1965–present)
- Classic World Racing (2007–present)
- Caton (2020–present)
- CallumDesigns (2019–present)
- Contera (2015–present)

D

- Dakar 4x4 Design & Conversions (1991–present)
- Dare (UK) (1990–present)
- Darrian Cars (1984–present)
- David Brown (2013–present)
- Dax Cars / 427 Motor Company (1968–present)
- DNA Automotive (2003–present)
- Doon Buggies (1999–present)
- Dowsetts Classic Cars (2019–present)

E

- Eadon Green (2016–present)
- Eagle E-Types (2013–present)
- Eclipse Sportscars (2008–present)
- Elemental Cars (2014–present)
- Elysee (car brand) (1991/1993?–present)
- Europe Engineering (1989–present)
- EV by Alpha (2022–present)
- Exact Replicas (2006–present)
- Extreme sports cars (2002–present)
- E-Type UK (2019–present)

F

- Fering Technologies (2019–present)
- Foers (car brand) (1977–present)
- Forseven (2022–present)
- Frontline Developments (1991–present)
- FRS Sports Cars (2011–present)
- Furore Cars (2011–present)

G

- Gardner Douglas Sports Cars (1990–present)
- Gentry (car brand) (1973–present)
- Gibbs (2004–present)
- Ginetta (1957–present)
- GKD Sports Cars (2004–present)
- Gordon Murray Automotive (2017–present)
- GP (car brand) (1966–present)
- Great British Sports Cars (2006–present)
- Grinnall (1993–present)
- GTO Engineering (1996–present)

H

- Hawk (1986–present)
- HDS (car brand) (1987–present)
- Healy Designs (2004–present)

I

- Imperial Motor Company (2009–present)
- Ineos Automotive (2017–present)

J

- Jaguar Land Rover (2013–present)
- JBA Motors (1982–present)
- Jensen Cars Group (2008–present)
- Jensen International Automotive (2010–present)
- JH Classics (2010–present)
- JW Engineering and Motorsport (2011–present)
- JZR (1989–1998; 2000–present)

K

- Kellform's Woodmasters (1964–present)
- Kingfisher Kustoms (1983–present)
- Kougar Cars (1976–present)

L

- LB Specialist Cars (2010–present)
- Lenham Motor Company (1962–present)
- Liege Motor Company (1995–present)
- Lister (1954–1959; 1986–2006; 2013–present)
- Locust (car brand)
- Lomax Motor Company (1982–present)
- London Electric Vehicle Company (2013–present)
- Lotus Cars (1952–present)
- Lynx (car brand) (1968–present)
- Lynx AE (1986–present)

M

- Mac Motorsports (2002–present)
- Madgwick Cars (2001–present)
- Maelstrom (car brand) (1986–present)
- Manx (car brand) (1999–present)
- Marlin (1979–2019)
- Martin & Walker (1987–present)
- McLaren (1969–1970; 1993–1998; 2005–present)
- MG Motor (1924-present)
- Midas Automotive (2002–present)
- Mike King Racing (1970–present)
- Mill Auto Conversions (2006–present)
- MEV Ltd (2003–present)
- Midas Cars (1978–present)
- Midge Owners' and Builders' Club (1985–present)
- Midland Classic Restorations (2009–present)
- Minari Engineering (1990–present)
- Mini (1969–present)
- Mini Scamp (1969–present)
- Minus cars (1984–present)
- Mirach (car brand) (1988–present)
- MST Cars (2009–present)
- MK Automotive Ltd (1996–present)
- MNR Sports Cars (1998–present)
- Morgan (1910–present)
- Morris Commercial (2015–present)
- MR 2 kits (2002–present)
- Munro Vehicles (2019–present)

N

- Noble (1998–present)
- Nichols Cars (2017–present)

O

- Onyx Sports Cars (1990–present)

P

- Parallel Designs (2000–present)
- Peel Engineering (2008–present)
- Pembleton Motor Company (1999–present)
- Peninsula Sports Cars (2008–present)
- Perrinn (2011–present)
- Phoenix Automotive Developments (2011–present)
- Pilbeam Racing Designs (1975–present)
- Pilgrim Cars (1985–present)
- Procomp Motorsport (1970?–present)
- Prodrive (1984–present)
- Prowler (car brand) (1999–present)

Q

- Quantum Sports Cars (1987–present)

R

- Radical (1997–present)
- Raptor Sports Cars (2014–present)
- Realm Engineering (1984–present)
- Renegade (car brand) (1960s–present)
- Riversimple (2007–present)
- Roadrunner Racing (2007–present)
- Rolls-Royce Motor Cars (1998–present)
- Ronart (1984–present)
- Roy Kelly Kits & Classics (1999–present)
- RML Group (1984–present)
- RS (car brand) (1998–present)

S

- Searoader Cars (2003–present)
- Sebring Works (1994–2019; 2020–Present)
- Sidewinder (car brand) (1999–present)
- Simod Design (1998–present)
- SIN Cars (2012–present)
- Speedster Clinic (2000–present)
- Spire Sports Cars (2005–present)
- Spyders Inc (2003–present)
- Stuart Taylor Motorsport (1998–present)
- Sylva Autokits (1981–present)

T

- Tempest of England (1988–present)
- The Sammio Motor Company (2010–present)
- The Star Motor Company (2000s–present)
- Thornley Kelham (2008–present)
- Tiger Racing (1989–present)
- Tim Dutton Amphibious Cars (1994–present)
- Toniq Sports Cars (2003–present)
- Tornado Sports Cars (1984–present)
- Tribute Automotive (2011–present)
- Trident Sports Cars (2002–present)
- Triking (1978–present)
- Turismo UK (2015–present)
- Tushek Limited (2017–present)
- TVR (1947–present)
- TWR Replicas (2010?–present)
- Theon Design (2016–present)
- TuthillPorsche (2014–present)

U

- Ultima (1992–present)

V

- Vanwall 1958 (2016–present)
- Vauxhall Motors (1903–present)
- Vincent (car brand) (1982–present)
- Vital Spark Group Ltd (2020–present)
- Volksrod (1968–present)
- Vortex Automotive (1997–present)

W

- Wells Motor Cars (2021–present)
- Westfield (1982–present)
- Williams (1977–present)

X

- Xanthos (car brand) (1990–present)

== Former manufacturers ==
=== A ===
- Abbey (1922)
- ABC (1920–1929)
- Aberdonia (1911–1915)
- Abingdon (1902–1903)
- Abingdon (1922–1923)
- Academy (1906–1908)
- Accles-Turrell (1899–1901)
- Ace (1912–1916)
- Achilles (1904–1908)
- ADA (1984?-1989?)
- Adams & Co. (1903–1906)
- Adams (1905–1914) (article)
- Adamson (1912–1925)
- Addison (1906)
- Advance (1902–1912)
- AEM (1987)
- Aero Car (1919–1920)
- Aeroford (1920–1925)
- Africar (1982–1988)
- AGR (1911–1915)
- Ailsa (1907–1910)
- Ailsa-Craig (1901–1910)
- Airedale (1919–1924)
- AJS (1930–1932)
- Albany (1903–1905) (steam)
- Albany (1971–1997)
- Albatros (1923–1924)
- Alberford (1922–1924)
- Albert (1920–1921)
- Albion (1900–1913)
- ALC (1913)
- Alex (1908)
- Allard (1899–1902)
- Allard (1937–1960)
- Alldays & Onions (1898–1918)
- Allwyn (1920)
- All-British (1906–1908)
- Alta (1931–1947)
- Alvechurch (1912)
- Alvis (1919–1967)
- Amazon (1921–1922)
- AMC (1910) (steam)
- André (1933–1934)
- Anglian (1905–1907)
- Anglo-American (1899–1900)
- Anglo-French (1896–1897)
- Angus-Sanderson (1919–1927)
- Arab (1926–1928)
- Arbee (1904)
- Archer (1920)
- Arden (1912–1916)
- Argon (1908)
- Argyll (1899–1928; 1976–1990)
- Ariel (1898–1915; 1922–1925)
- Arkley (1970–1995)
- Armadale (1906–1907)
- Armstrong (1902–1904)
- Armstrong (1913–1914)
- Armstrong Siddeley (1919–1960)
- Armstrong Whitworth (1904–1919)
- Arno (1908)
- Arnold (1896–1898)
- Arnott (1951–1957)
- Arrival (2015–2024)
- Arrol-Aster (1927–1931)
- Arrol-Johnston (1896–1928)
- Arsenal (1898–1899)
- Ascari (1995–2010)
- Ascot (1904)
- Ascot (1928–1930)
- Ashley (1954–1962)
- Ashton-Evans (1919–1928)
- Asquith (1901–1902)
- Aster (1922–1930)
- Astra (1954–1959)
- Astral (1923–1924)
- Atalanta (1915–1917)
- Atalanta (1937–1939)
- Athmac (1913)
- Atkinson and Philipson (1896)
- Atomette (1922)
- Attila (1903–1906)
- Aurora (1904)
- Ausfod (1947–1948)
- Austin (1906–1989)
- Austin-Healey (1952–1971)
- Autocrat (1920s) (see Hampton)
- Autotrix (1911–1914)
- Autovia (1936–1938)
- AV (1919–1924)
- Axon (2005–2020)

=== B ===
- Baby Blake (1922)
- Baker & Dale (1913)
- Bamby (1984)
- Banham Conversions (1970s–2004)
- Bantam (1913)
- Barnard (1921–1922)
- Barnes (1904–1906)
- Batten (1935–1938)
- Baughan (1920–1929)
- Bayliss-Thomas (1922–1929)
- Beacon (1912–1914)
- Bean (1919–1929)
- Beardmore (1919–1966)
- Bedford (1931-1986)
- Bell (1920)
- Belsize (1901–1925)
- Berkeley (1913)
- Berkeley (1956–1960)
- Bifort (1914–1920)
- Billings-Burns (1900)
- Black Prince (1920)
- Blériot-Whippet (1920–1927)
- BMA (1952–1954)
- Boncar (1905–1907) (steam)
- Bond (1948–1974)
- Bolsover (1902) (steam)
- Bound (1920)
- Bow-V-Car (1922–1923)
- BPD (1913)
- Brabham (1962–1992)
- Bradbury (mainly motorcycles, 1902–1924)
- Bradwell (1914)
- Breckland (2000–2009)
- Bremer (1892, first British car)
- Bridgwater (1904–1907)
- Bristol (1946–2020)
- Britannia (1913–1914)
- British Leyland (1968-1986)
- British Motor Corporation (1952-1966)
- British Racing Motors (1949–1997)
- British Salmson (1934–1939)
- Briton (1909–1928)
- Broadway (1913)
- Brooke (1901–1913)
- Brotherhood (1904–1907)
- Brough Superior (1935–1939)
- BSA (1907–1926; 1929–1940; 1958–1960)
- Buckingham (1914–1923)
- Buckler (1947–circa 1962)
- Butler (1888–1896)
- Burney (1930–1933)
- Bushbury Electric (1897)

=== C ===
- C & H (car) (Corfield & Hurle) (article)
- Calcott (1913–1926)
- Calthorpe (1905–1926)
- Cambro (1920–1921)
- Campion (1893–1926)
- Cannon
- Caparo (2006–2019)
- Carden (1912–1923)
- Carlette (1913)
- Carter
- Castle Three (1919–1922)
- Century Engineering (1885-1907)
  (de: Century Engineering)
- Certus (1907–1908)
- CFB (1920–1921)
- CFL
- Centaur (1974–1978)
- Chambers (1904–1929)
- Charawacky (1894–1914)
- Chater-Lea (1907–1922)
- Chota (1912–1913)
- Christchurch-Campbell (1922)
- Clan (1971–1974; 1982–1985)
- Clarendon (1902–1904)
- CLEVER (2006–2012?)
- Climax (1905–1909)
- Climax Cars Ltd (2007–2018)
- Cluley (1921–1928)
- Clyno (1922–1930)
- Connaught (1952–1959)
- Connaught (2004–2016)
- Cook (circa 1901–1902) (steam)
- Cooper (1947–1951)
- Corona (1920–1923)
- Coronet (1904–1906)
- Coronet (1957–1960)
- Coventry (1896–1903)
- Coventry-Eagle (1899)
- Coventry Premier (1912–1923)
- Coventry Victor (1926–1938)
- Cripps
- Crompton
- Crossley (1904–1937)
- Crouch (1912–1928)
- Crowdy (1909–1912)
- Croxted (1904–1905)
- Cubitt (1920–1925)
- Cumbria (1914) (article)
- CWS

=== D ===
- Daimler (1896–2012)
- Dalgliesh-Gullane (1907–1908)
- Dallison (1913)
- Dawson (1919–1921)
- Dayton (1922)
- Deasy (1906–1911)
- Deemster (1914–1924)
- Derek (1925–1926)
- Dellow (1949–1959)
- DeLorean (1981–1982)
- Dennis (1895–1915)
- Dewcar (1913–1914)
- Diva (1961–1966)
- D.Ultra (1914–1916)
- DL (1913–1920)
- Douglas (1913–1922)
- Dunalistair (1925–1926)
- Duo (1912–1914)
- Duplex (1919–1921)
- Dursley-Pedersen (1912)
- Mr. Hinsz (1900)

=== E ===
- Eadie (1898–1901)
- Eaglet (1948)
- Economic (1921–1922)
- Edismith (1905)
- Edmond
- Edmund
- Edwards
- E.J.Y.R. (Rutherford) (1906–1912) (steam)
- Ekstromer (1905)
- Electric Motive Power (1897)
- Electromobile (1901–1920)
- Elswick (1903–1907)
- Elva (1958–1968)
- Emms (1922–1923)
- Endurance (1899–1901)
- Enfield (1969–1973)
- English Mechanic (1900–1913)
- English Racing Automobiles (Active from 1933–1954, later made the Mini ERA Turbo)
- Esculapeus (1902)
- Eterniti (2010–2014)
- Evante (1983–1991)
- Excelsior (1896 motorcycles; 1922–1926 cars)
- EYME

=== F ===
- Fairthorpe (1954–1973)
- Farboud (1999–2006)
- Farbio (2005–2010)
- FBS (2001-2003)
- Fletcher (1967)
- Fleur de Lys Vehicle Manufacturing (1983–1994)
- Ford (1909–2002)
- Foy Steel (1913–1916)
- Frazer Nash (1924–1957)
- Frisky (1958-1961)
- Fubar Street Hoppa (2008-2017)

=== G ===
- Galloway (1920–1928)
- Garrard (1904)
- Garrard & Blumfield (1894–1896)
- GB
- Geering (1899–1904)
- Gerald (1920)
- Gibbons (1917–1929)
- Gilbern (1959–1973)
- Gilbert (1901)
- Gilburt (1904–1905)
- Gill (1958–1960)
- Gillyard
- Glover
- GN (1910–1925)
- Gnome
- Godfrey-Proctor (1928–1929)
- Godsal (1935)
- Gordano
- Gordon (1903–1904)
- Gordon (1912–1916)
- Gordon (1954–1958)
- Gordon GT (1959)
- Gordon-Keeble (1960–1961; 1964–1967)
- Gordon Newey
- Grahame-White
- Grose (1898–1901)
- GTM Cars (1967-2022)
- Gordon Murray Automotive (2017–present)
- Guildford
- Guy (circa 1919–1932)
- GWK (1911–1931)
- Gwynnes (1922–1929)
- Gwynne-Albert (1923–1929)

=== H ===
- Hampton (1911–1933)
- HCE (1912–1913)
- Healey (1946–1954)
- Herbert Engineering (1919–1931)
- Hewett Car (circa 1900)
- Hewinson-Bell (circa 1900)
- Heybourn
- Hill & Stanier (1914)
- Hillman (1907–1976)
- HMC
- Horley (automobile) (1904-1909) - The Horley Motor & Engineering Co. Ltd
- Horstmann (1914–1929)
- Honda (1985-2021)
- Howard
- Howett
- HP (1926–1928)
- HRG (1936–1956)
- Hubbard (1904–1905)
- Humber (1896–1976)

=== I ===
- Iden (1904–1907)
- Imperial (1901–circa 1906; 1904–1905; 1914)
- Image Sports Cars (2005–2022)
- Invacar (1947–1977)
- Ineos Automative (2017–Present)
- Invicta
- Invicta (1900–1905; 1913–1914; 1925–1950; 2004–2012)
- Iris (1906–1925)
- Ivel (1899-1900)

=== J ===
- James and Browne (1901–1910)
- Jappic (1925)
- JAS speed kits (1998–2008)
- J. A. Ryley (article)
- JBA (1982–2007)
- JBS
- Jensen (1936–1976; 1983–1992; 1999–2002)
- Jensen-Healey (1972–1976)
- Jewel
- Jimini (1973–2011)
- Joel-Rosenthal (1899–circa 1902)
- John O'Gaunt (1901–1904)
- Jones
- Jowett (1906–1954)

=== K ===
- Karminski (1902)
- Keating (2008–2021)
- Keenelet (1904) (steam)
- Kendall
- Kieft (1954–1955)
- Kingsburgh (1901–1902)
- Knight (1895)
- Kyma (1903–1905)
- Kadirovich Motors (1897-1926)

=== L ===
- La Rapide
- LAD (1913–1926)
- Ladas (1906)
- Lagonda (1906–1964)
- Lambert (1911–1912)
- Lammas-Graham (1936–1938)
- Lanchester (1895–1956)
- Land Master (1970s–1980s).
- Land Rover (1948)
- Latham Sportscars (1983-1990)
- Laurence-Jackson (1920)
- Leading Edge (2002-2005)
- LEC
- Lecoy (1921–1922)
- Lea-Francis (1903–1906; 1920–1935; 1937–1952; 1980; 1999)
- Lee Stroyer (1903–1905)
- Lems (1903–1904)
- Lester Solus (1913)
- Leuchters (1898)
- Leyland (1896) (steam)
- Leyland (1920–1923)
- Lifu (1899–1902) (steam)
- Light Car Company (1991-1998)
- Lington
- LM (Little Midland) (1910–1922)
- Lloyd (1936–1950)
- Loyd-Lord (1922-1924) (See Vivian Loyd & Loyd Carrier (1938))
- Lonsdale (1982–1983)
- Lotis (1908–1912)
- LTI (sometimes Carbodies) (1919–2013)
- Lucar (1913–1914)

=== M ===
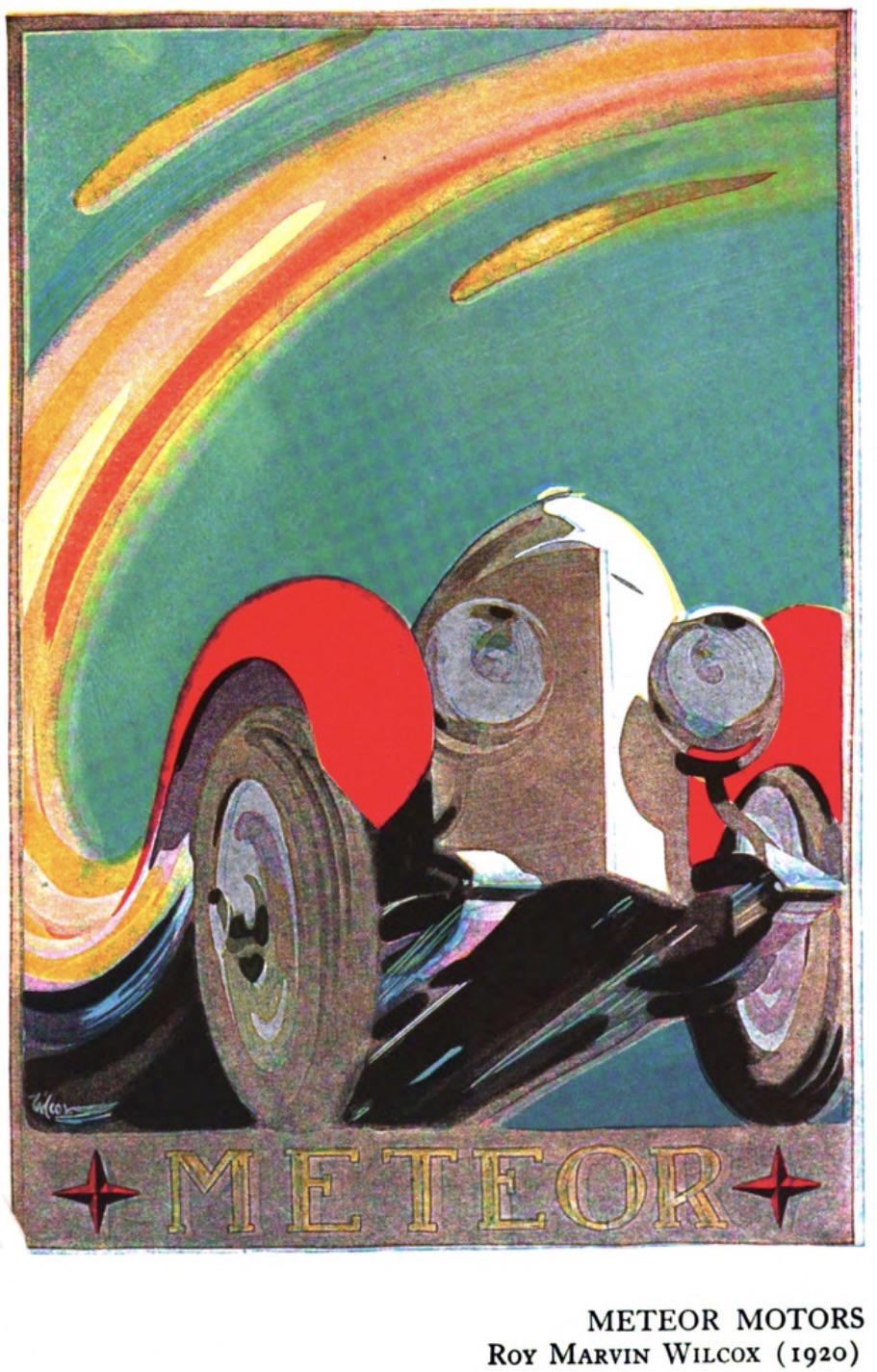
Meteor Motors

- Matchless (mostly motorcycles, but offered a cyclecar in 1912)
- Madelvic (1898–1900)
- Maiflower (1919–1921)
- Marauder (1950–1952)
- Marcos (1959–2007)
- Marcus
- Marendaz (1926–1936)
- Marlborough (1906–1926)
- Marshall-Arter (article)
- Maudslay (1902–1923)
- McMurtry 2016–Present
- MCC (1902–1904) (steam)
- Mead & Deakin (Medea) (article)
- Medinger (article)
- Menley
- Meteor Motors (1914-1916) Meteor Motors
- Metrocab (1987–2021)
- Meteorite (article)
- Metro-Tyler (article)
- MG cars (1923–2005)
- MG Motor (2006–2016)
- Modec (2004–2011)
- Morris (1913–1983)
- Motor Carrier (1904)

=== N ===
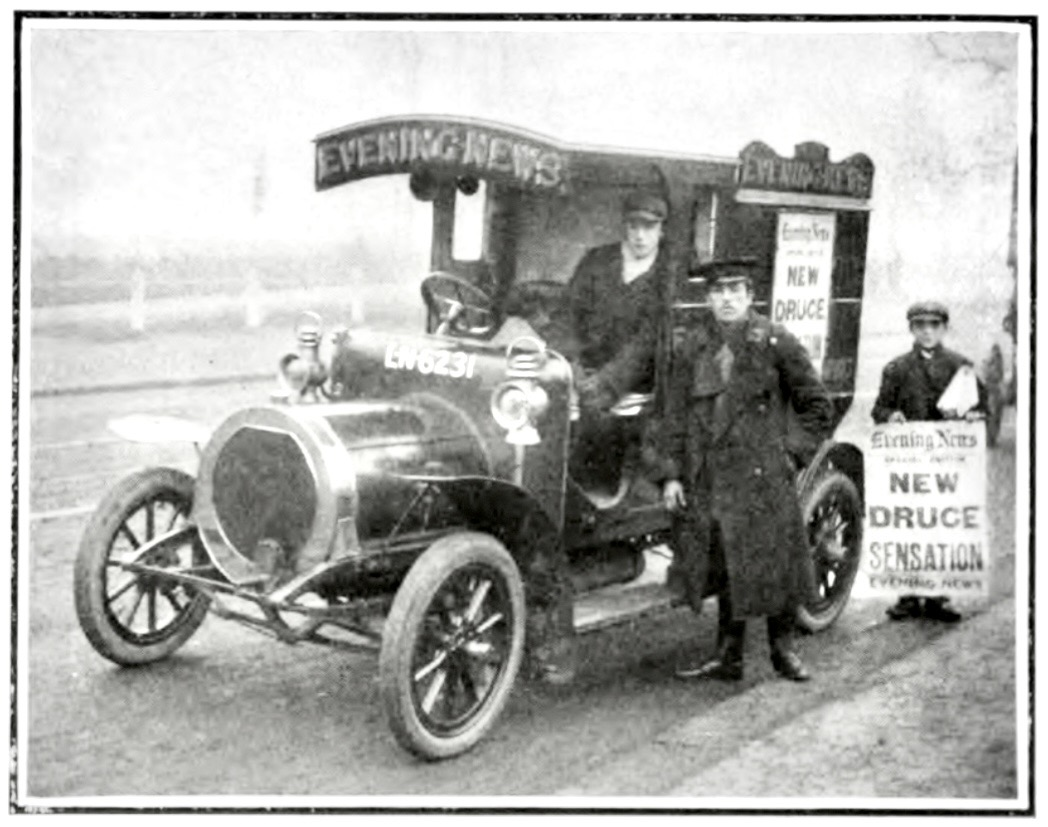
New Leader (1906-1907)

- Napier (circa 1900–1924)
- Napoleon (1903)
- Neale (1896)
- New British (1921–1923)
- New Carden (1923–1925)
- New Engine Company Ltd (1905–1921)
- New Hudson (1903–1943)
- New Imperial Motors (1887; 1901; various guises 1912–1939) (motorcycles)
- New Leader (1905-1907) Leader
- New Speedwell Motor Co., Ltd (1900–1908)
- Newey (1907–1921)
- NF Auto Developments (1995–2008)
- Nomad (1925–1926) (article)
- North Star (article)
- Norma
- Nova (1971–1996)

=== O ===
- Ogle (1960–1972)
- OK-Supreme (1899)
- Omega (1925–1927)
- Oppermann (1898–1907)
- Orpington (1907–1920s)
- OVIK Crossway (2008–2020)
- Owen Petelectra (1906)

=== P ===
- Palladium (1912-1924)
- Palm (1922–1923)
- Palmerston (1920–1922)
- Panther (1972–1992)
- Paragon (article)
- Paramount (1950–1956)
- Parker (1899–1902) (steam)
- Paydell (1924–1925)
- Payze (1920–1921)
- Pearson & Cox (1913) (steam)
- Peel (1955–1966)
- Peerless (1957–1960)
- Perry (1913–1916)
- Phoenix (1903–1926)
- Phoenix (1905)
- Pickering, Darley & Allday (PDA) (1912–1913)
- Piper (1967–1975)
- Premier (PMC) (article)
- Princess
- Projecta (1914)
- Pyramid (article)

=== Q ===
- Quadrant (1905–1906)
- Quasar-Unipower (1968)
- Queen (1904–1905)

=== R ===
- Railton (1933–1950; 1989–1994)
- Ralph Lucas (1901–circa 1908)
- Ranger (article)
- Rapier (1933–1937)
- Raymond Mays V8 (1938–1939)
- Reliant (1952–2002)
- Renault (at least in 1951)
- Renegade Speedsters (2008–2013)
- Rex (1901–1914)
- Richardson (1903)
- Richardson (1919)
- Rickett (1858–1860) (steam)
- Ridley (1901–1907)
- Riley (1898–1969)
- Robertson (1915–1916) (article)
- Robinson & Price (1905–1914)
- Rochdale (1952–1968)
- Rodley (1954–1956)
- Rollo (1911–1913)
- Roper-Corbet (1911–1913)
- Rover (1904–2005)
- Royal Enfield (1899–1967)
- Royal Ruby (1909–1932)
- RTC (Rene Tondeur) (article)
- Rudge (1912–1913)
- Russon (1951–1952)
- Ruston-Hornsby (1919–1924)
- RW Kit Cars (1983–2000)
- Ryley (1901–1902)
- Rytecraft (1934–1940)

=== S ===
- Santler (1889–1922)
- Scootacar (1957–1964)
- Scott (1921–1925)
- Senlac (1901)
- Sharp's (1949–1974)
- Sheffield-Simplex (1907–1920)
- Sherpley (1997–2007)
- Siddeley (1902–1904; 1912–1919)
- Siddeley-Deasy (1906–1919)
- Simplic (1914)
- Simpson (1897–1904) (steam)
- Sinclair (1984–1985)
- Singer (1901–1970)
- Sizaire-Berwick
- Skeoch (1921)
- Skirrow (1936–1939)
- Smith & Dowse (1900)
- Spectre Supersports (1977)
- Speedex (1958-1962)
- Speedy (article)
- Sports Junior (1920–1921)
- Squire (1935–1936)
- SS (1934–1945)
- Standard (1903–1963)
- Star (1898–1932)
- Sterling (1987–1992)
- Stesroc (1905–1906) (steam)
- Storey (1920–1931)
- Straker-Squire (1906–1925)
- Strathcarron (1998–2001)
- Suffolk Jaguar (1990–2020)
- Sunbeam (1899–1937; 1953–1976)
- Sunbeam-Talbot (1938–1954)
- Swallow (1927–1933)
- Swallow Doretti (1954–1955)
- Swift (1900–1931)

=== T ===
- Talbot (1903–1938)
- Tamplin (1919–1925)
- T.B. (Thompson Brothers) (1919–1924)
- Tiny (1912–1915)
- Tippen (Frank) Ltd of Coventry, Invalid Carriages (1935–1967)
- Tornado (1958–1964)
- Tourette (1956–1958)
- Toward & Philipson (1897)
- Trident (1965–1978)
- Triumph (1923–1984)
- Trojan (1922–1936; 1962–1965)
- Turner-Miesse (1902–1913) (steam)
- Turner (1902–1928)
- Turner (1951–1966)
- Tyseley (1912–1914)

=== U ===
- Unipower (1966–1970)
- Unique (article)
- Urecar (1923)
- Utopian (1914)

=== V ===
- VAL
- Vale (1932–1935)
- Valveless (1908–1915)
- Vanden Plas (1960–1980)
- Vanwall (1954–1960)
- Vapomobile (1902–1904)
- Vee Gee (1913)
- Veloce (circa 1900)
- Velox (1902–1904)
- Victor (1916–1920)
- Vulcan (1902–1928)

=== W ===
- WAM Replicas (1997–?)
- Warfield (1903) (steam)
- Warne (1913–1915)
- Warren-Lambert (1912–1922)
- Waverley (1910-1928)
- Westall
- Wherwell
- Warwick (1960–1962)
- Weigel (1906–1909)
- Whitgift (article)
- Whitlock (1903–1932)
- Wigan-Barlow (1922–1923)
- Wilbrook (1913)
- Williamson (1913–1916)
- Wilson-Pilcher (1901–1904)
- Willis (1913)
- Windsor (British automobile) (1924–1927)
- Winson (1920)
- Wooler (1919–1920)
- Winter (1913–1914)
- Wolseley (1901–1975)
- Woodrow (1913–1915)
- Wrigley (1913)
- WSC (Wholesale Supply Company) (1914) (article)
- Wyvern (1913–1914)

=== X ===
- Xtra (1922–1924)

=== Y ===
- YEC (1907–1908)

=== Z ===
- Zendik (1912–1913)
- Zenith (1905–1906)
- Zenos (2012–2017)
- Zolfe Cars (2008–2016)

== See also ==
- Automotive industry in the United Kingdom
- List of automobile manufacturers
- List of automobile marques
- List of current automobile manufacturers by country
- List of current automobile marques
- List of microcars by country of origin
- Timeline of motor vehicle brands
- Cyclecars U.K.
- List of steam car makers

== Notes ==
=== Other sources ===
- G.N. Georgano, Nick (Ed.). The Beaulieu Encyclopedia of the Automobile. Chicago: Fitzroy Dearborn Publishers, 2000. ISBN 1-57958-293-1
