= Sinclair Motor Works =

British motor manufacturer

- Industry: Automotive
- Founded: 1899; 127 years ago
- Founder: E.H. Clift
- Defunct: 1902; 124 years ago
- Headquarters: London, United Kingdom
- Products: Cars

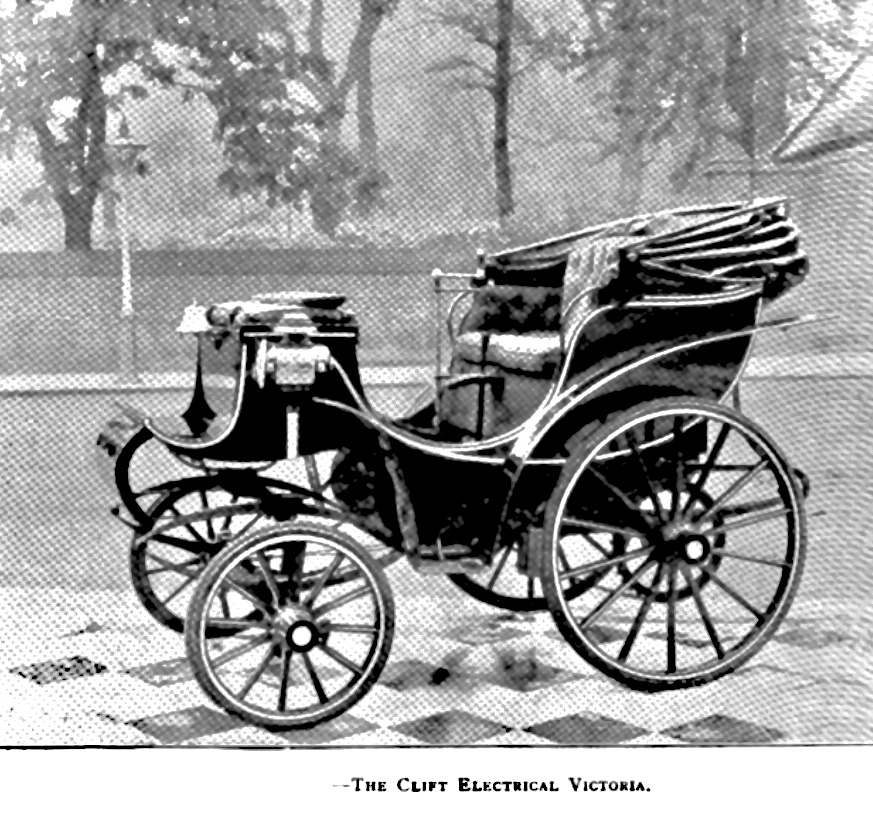
Clift electrical Victoria (1899)

The Sinclair Motor Works was an English car manufacturer at London.

== History ==
The company began producing automobiles in 1899. The brand names were Clift and Sinclair. The vehicles under the brand name Clift were electric vehicles. In contrast, the vehicles under the Sinclair brand had gasoline engines. There were smaller models with rear engines and either 5 hp or 7 hp. The largest model had a front engine with 10 hp. The engine power was transmitted to the rear axle via a driveshaft. The workshop was located at 51 Sinclair road Kensington in London.

== Technical data ==
The four-seater Clift Victoria with a removable so-called "Tiger" seat at the back was equipped with a battery of 40 accumulators under the seats. The cells were self-made with Headland positive plates and Clift negative plates. The weight of the battery is 1,200 lb = 544 kg. One charge was enough for a drive of 50 miles on normal roads. The electric motor had a continuous power output of 3 hp, but could briefly deliver up to 6 hp. The engine is located in the middle under the car and drives the rear wheels via chains. A two-speed gearbox in between adjusts the torque. The controller allows three forward and three reverse speeds. These are up to 4, 8, and 16 miles per hour. An increased speed of 18 miles per hour could be controlled as a boost via the heel of the foot. The road wheels have wooden spokes and solid tires. Two brakes are present: a band brake, operated by a foot pedal and acting on the differential, and drum brakes, operated by a hand lever on the rear wheels. The total weight of the Clift car is 25 cwt.

Production ended in 1902.

== See also ==
- List of car manufacturers of the United Kingdom
