= Kyma =

Kyma (κύμα) is a Greek word meaning wave, and may refer to:

- Kyma (sound design language), a software environment for specifying and manipulating audio signals
- KYMA-DT, the call letters of a television station in Yuma, Arizona USA
  - KYMA-DT (1988–2020)
- Kyma (automobile), an English automobile
- Kyma (river), a river in Northern Russia
