= Batten (car) =

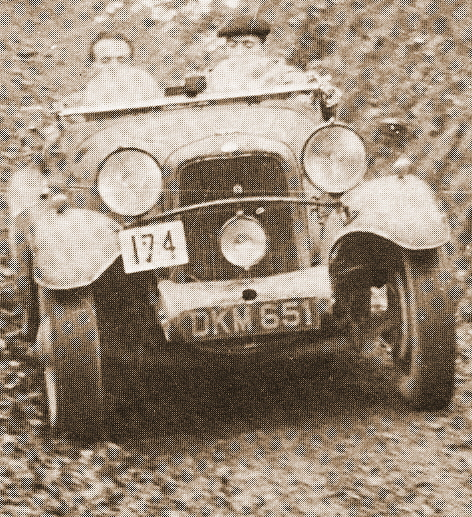
1937 Batten V8

The Batten was a British car made in Beckenham, Kent between 1935 and 1938 based on the 1932 Ford Model 18 V-8. The cars were successfully campaigned in trials and racing events.

Of the several Anglo-American hybrid cars produced in the late 1930s the Batten probably had the highest performance. The car used a Ford chassis shortened by 16 inches (410 mm) and narrowed at the rear with the transverse spring suspension retained on most cars but reset. The 3622 cc V-8 engine was tuned and with the car weighing only 2,180 pounds (990 kg) in its most basic form, a top speed of over 100 mph (160 km/h) was easily obtained.

Early cars had very basic racing bodies but retained several Ford panels including the radiator grille. Later cars got progressively more civilised and stylish.

About ten cars were made in total.

== See also ==
- List of car manufacturers of the United Kingdom
