= Abingdon (1902 automobile) =

The Abingdon, built in 1902 and 1903, is an English automobile made by John Child Meredith of Birmingham, who normally manufactured ignition equipment and accessories.

The range consisted of a 3 1/2 hp single-cylinder-engined two-seater with two-speed gearbox and chain drive. There was also the Meredith model with a 2-cylinder 9 hp engine and a 4-seater tonneau body.

== See also ==
- List of car manufacturers of the United Kingdom
