= Geering (automobile) =

The Geering was an English automobile manufactured from 1899 until 1904 by T Geering & Son makers of stationary engines. A product of Rolvenden, Kent, it was a crude car powered by a 3 hp twin-cylinder engine with chain drive; it ran on paraffin.

== See also ==
- List of car manufacturers of the United Kingdom
