= Baby Blake =

The Baby Blake was a British cyclecar manufactured by E.G. Blake in Croydon, Surrey in 1922.

It was unusual in being powered by two separate stroke engines driving friction discs. A third disc running between these and moveable backwards and forwards gave an infinitely variable drive to the rear axle. They were advertised at £150 but few were sold.

== See also ==
- List of car manufacturers of the United Kingdom
