= Gilburt =

The Gilburt was an English automobile manufactured from 1904 to 1905 in Kilburn, London. It was a two or three seater light car with a 6 hp twin-cylinder engine from Fafnir and used a tubular chassis and chain drive.

== See also ==
- List of car manufacturers of the United Kingdom
