= Atkinson and Philipson =

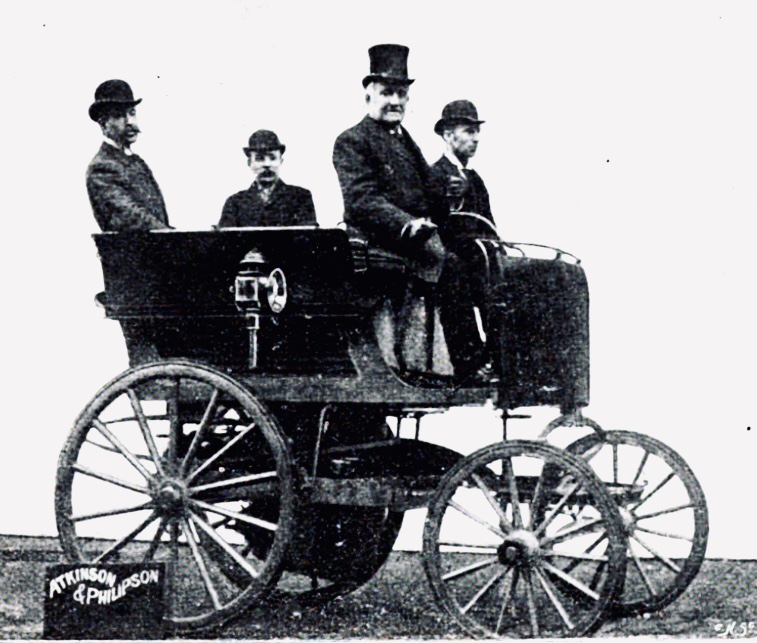
Atkinson & Philipson steam brake (1896–1897)

Atkinson & Philipson, of the Northumberland Coach Factory, Newcastle-on-Tyne, collaborated with Messrs. Toward and Co. to make a steam-powered car in 1896. The Coach Factory had been in business since 1774, making mail coaches, then railway carriages for George Stephenson. In 1896, they produced their steam brake with 'a very strong and neat frame' and iron-shod wheels, which was advertised in various motor papers. It is unknown if many were sold, but it is unlikely. Later (in 1912) they were advertised as motorcar body builders, and 'Coachmakers by Royal Warrant...'.

== See also ==
- List of car manufacturers of the United Kingdom
