= Palmerston (car) =

The Palmerston was a British car made by the Palmerston Motor Company based in Bournemouth, England between 1920 and 1923.

== History ==
The company was founded by the three Bullock brothers who were trading as motor engineers in 1919 . In 1920 they founded the Palmerston Motor Company in Palmerston Road, Boscombe with the ambition of building their own range of light cars. The Palmerston car was advertised for sale in late 1920 and exhibited at the London Motor Show by agents Olympic Aeros and Autos also based in Boscombe.

The company was under capitalised and in 1921 was declared bankrupt and sold to new owners Francis Henry Morris and Bertie Francis Plant trading as the Palmerston Lytcar Company. A new larger engined model was designed and called the Palm and sold alongside the Palmerston. In November 1921 the company was sold again and became Palmcars Ltd with Morris and Plant remaining as directors. The company still failed to make money and receivers were appointed in 1922. It was sold to one of the major shareholders, Frederick Goddard but it seems unlikely that any more cars were made.

The total number of cars made is not known with estimates between 30 and 100.

== Palmerston ==
Palmerston

Overview
- Manufacturer: Palmerston Motor Company
- Production: 1920-1922
- Designer: Harold Bullock

Body and chassis
- Class: light car
- Body style: two seat open

Powertrain
- Engine: Coventry-Victor twin cylinder
- Transmission: 3 speed manual

Chronology
- Successor: none

The Palmerston had a 6-9 hp Coventry-Victor water cooled, flat twin engine driving the rear wheels through a cone clutch, separately mounted three-speed gearbox and bevel geared rear axle. The brakes acted on the rear wheels using a hand lever with the foot brake operating a transmission brake on the drive shaft behind the gearbox. The steel section chassis had quarter-elliptic leaf springs front and rear. The early cars had wire spoked wheels later replaced by steel disc type.

The two-seat body was built in-house from aluminium over a wood frame and supplied with a folding hood (top) and one piece windscreen. Although the first cars featured acetylene lights, a dynamo lighting set was provided by 1921.

The car was advertised at £275.

== Palm ==
Palm

Overview
- Manufacturer: Palmerston Lytcar Company
- Production: 1922-1923

Body and chassis
- Body style: two seat open with dickey seat.

Powertrain
- Engine: Coventry-Victor 9hp twin cylinder
- Transmission: 3 speed manual

The Palm had a larger 1018 cc engine, still by Coventry-Victor, with a taxation horsepower class of 9 hp. The gearbox was mounted in-unit with the engine and the gear lever centrally placed. The body now featured a dickey seat but it was also possible to buy a bare chassis for the purchaser to mount their own body on.

In early 1922 the car was advertised at £275 and the smaller car had its price cut to £250. By the end of the year, the price had come down to £245 or £215 for a chassis.

== See also ==
- List of car manufacturers of the United Kingdom
