= Rollo (cyclecar) =

English cyclecar manufacturer

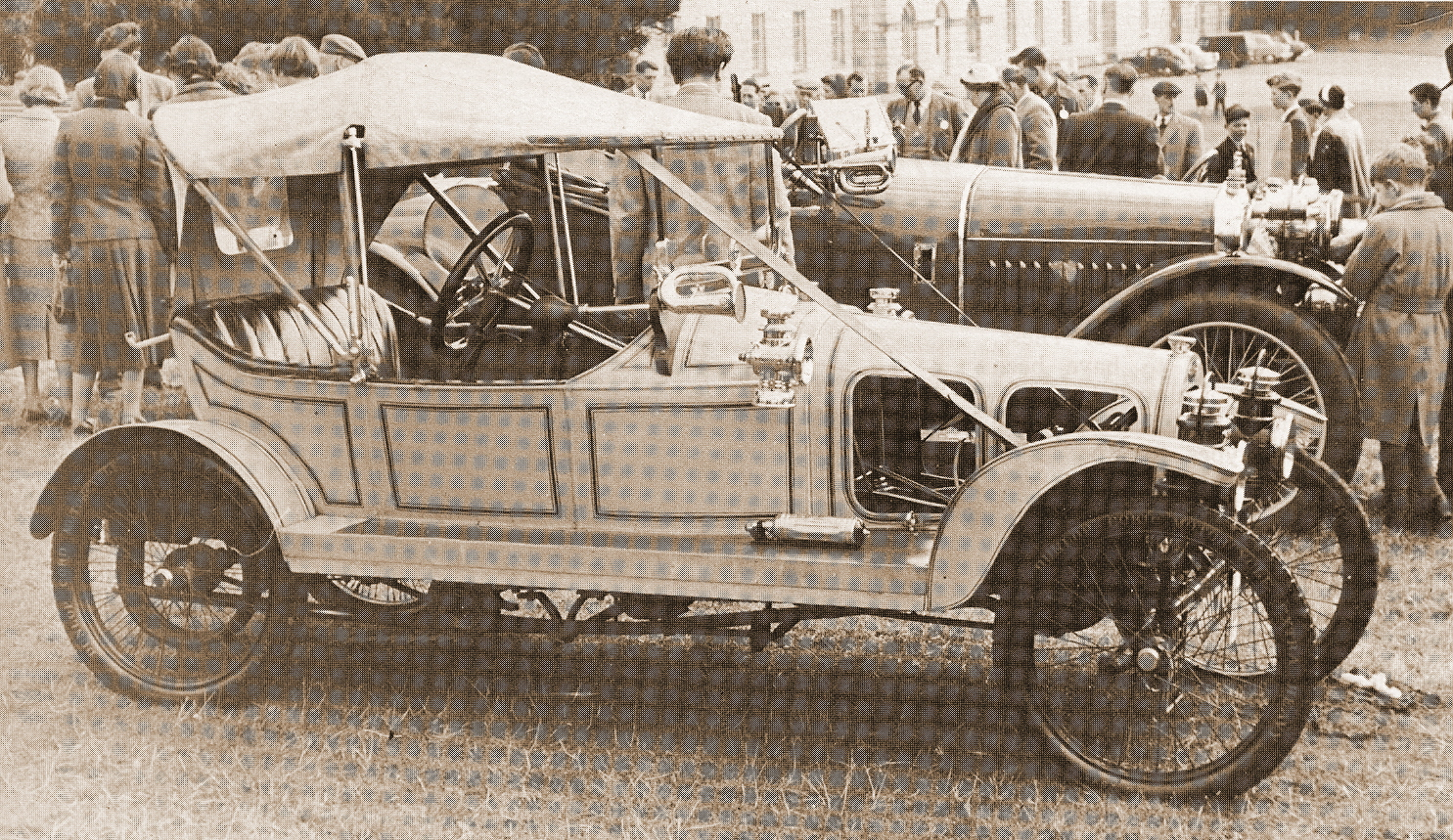
Rollo Sociable (1913)

The Rollo Car Co. was an English maker of cyclecars based in 140 Conybere Street, Birmingham and active between 1911 and 1913.

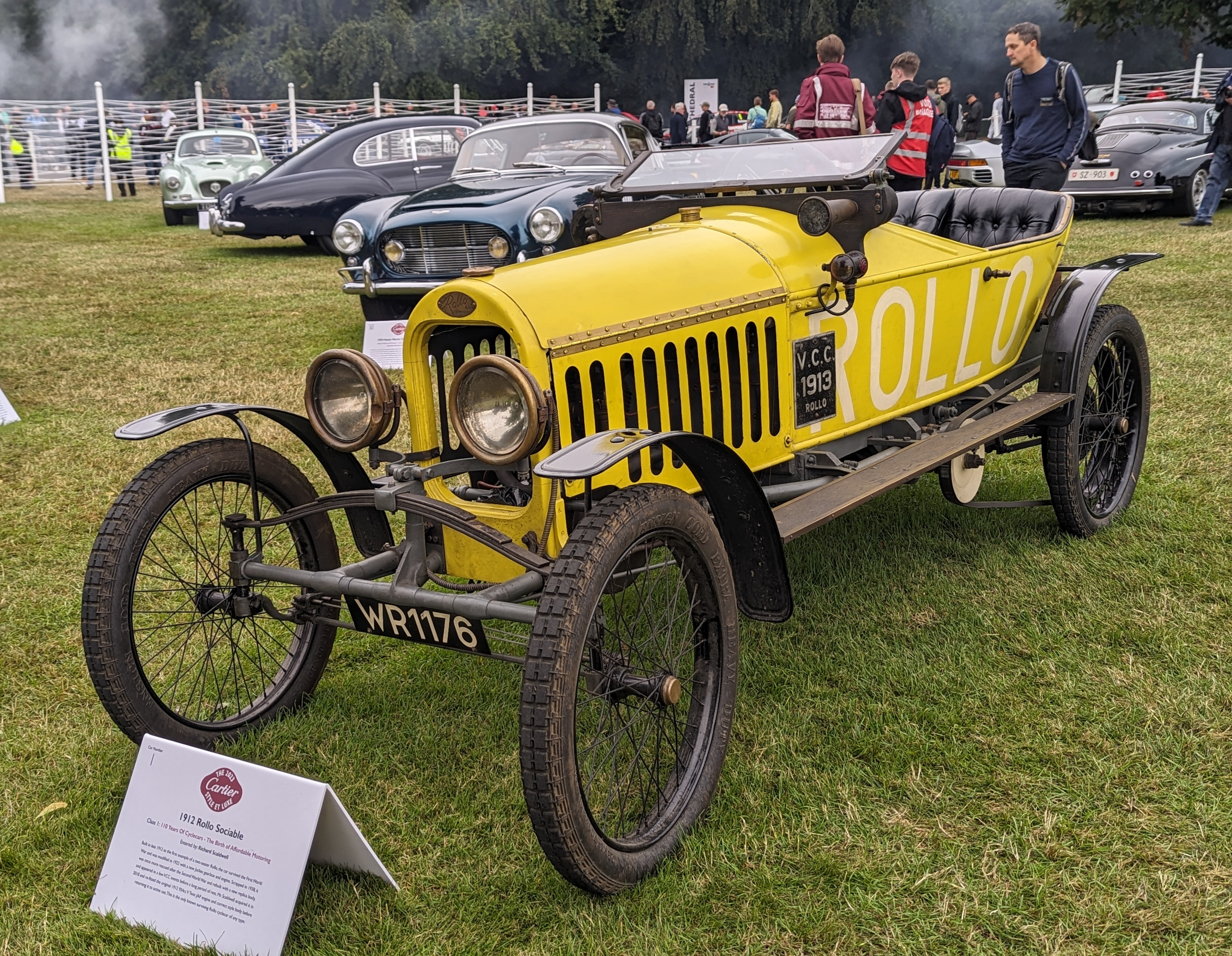
1912 Rollo Sociable

For 1913 three models were offered by the company. The 4 1/2 hp named the Pony had a single-cylinder 549 cc air-cooled engine made by Precision and had a single seat. The weight was 336 lb (152 kg), and in 1913 it cost 70 guineas. There were two variations of the larger car with V twin 964 cc 8 hp JAP engine air-cooled engine. One was the Rollo Tandem, with fore-and-aft seating with the driver in the rear seat, priced at 95 and 100 guineas in 1913 according to options, and 'for those who prefer to sit side by side' there was the Rollo Sociable, priced in 1913 at 100 guineas. All three cars had belt drive.

No cars were made after 1913 and the company was formally wound up in 1915.

== Models ==
Model	Dates	cylinder	capacity
4½ hp	1911–1913	1	549 cc
8 hp	1911–1913	2 V	964 cc

== See also ==
- List of car manufacturers of the United Kingdom
