= Rytecraft =

Rytecraft Scootacar
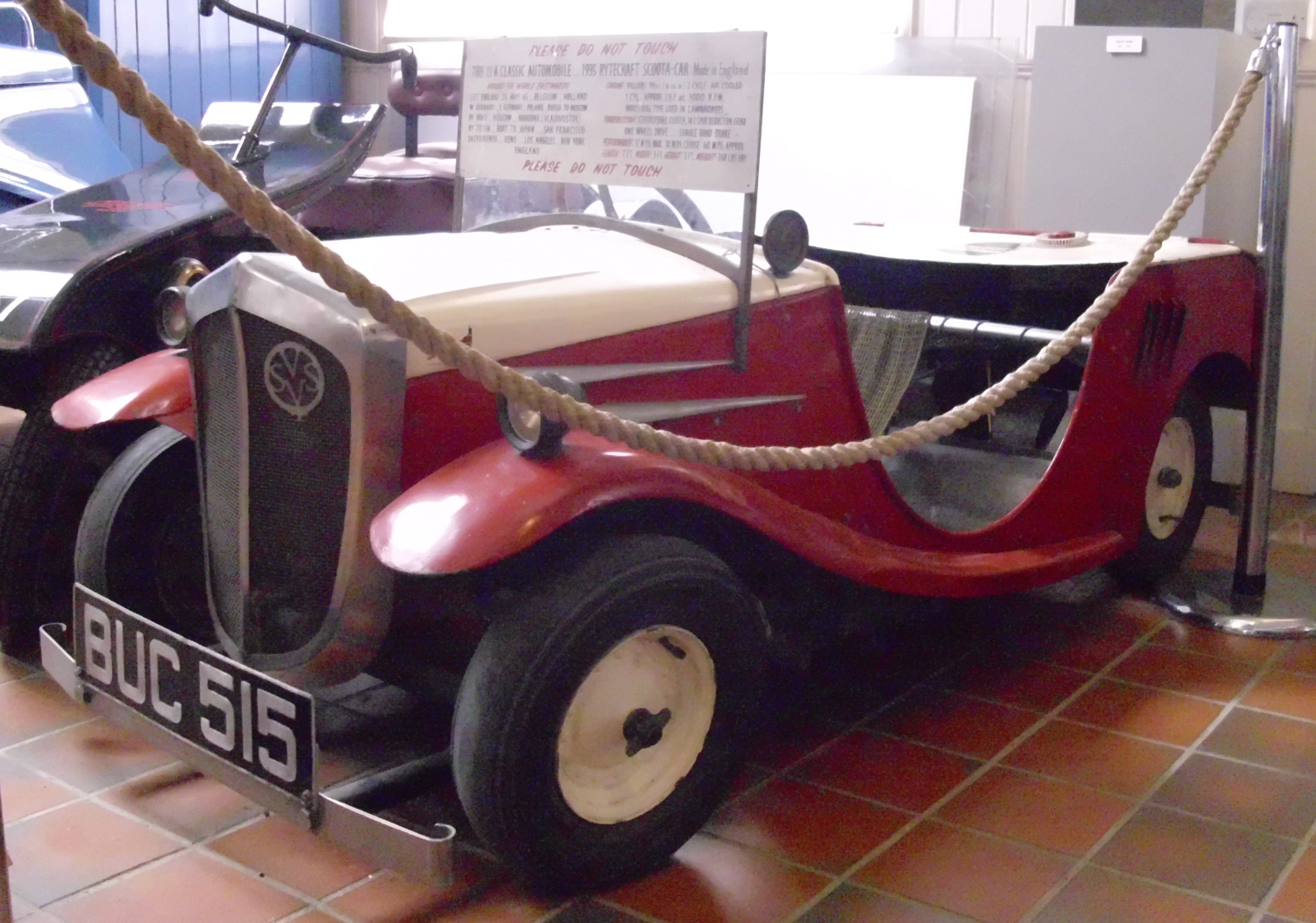

Overview
- Manufacturer: British Motorboat Manufacturing Company
- Production: 1934-1940
- Designer: Jack Shillan

Body and chassis
- Class: microcar
- Body style: single or two seat tourer

Powertrain
- Engine: 98 or 250 cc Villiers
- Transmission: 3-speed manual (but see text)

The Rytecraft Scootacar was a British microcar built by the British Motorboat Manufacturing Company in London between 1934 and 1940. The company later changed its name to BMB Engineering. It is possible that some might have been assembled after 1945.

This very small car originated as a fairground Dodgem and was electrically powered. In 1934, the designer Jack Shillan changed the engine to a 98 cc Villiers Midget single-cylinder engine and sold it for road use. The transmission was single speed and operated by a single pedal which opened the throttle on being pressed down and applied the brake when released. The clutch was automatic. There were no springs. Drive was to one of the rear wheels and the single brake operated on the other. It was said to be capable of reaching 15 mph (25 km/h). The body was open and had a single seat.

Later cars from about 1939 had a larger 250 cc engine, a three speed gearbox and normal pedal controls. Top speed was 40 mph (65 km/h). Two seats were now fitted along with electric lights. A commercial version, the Scootatruck was also made and for publicity some were styled to look like Vauxhall and Chrysler models.

About 1000 were made. In the 1960s Jim Parkinson drove one 15,000 miles (24,000 km) around the world and it was a 98 cc model. Several survive and one is on display at the Brooklands museum.

== See also ==
- List of car manufacturers of the United Kingdom
