= John O'Gaunt (automobile) =

English automobile

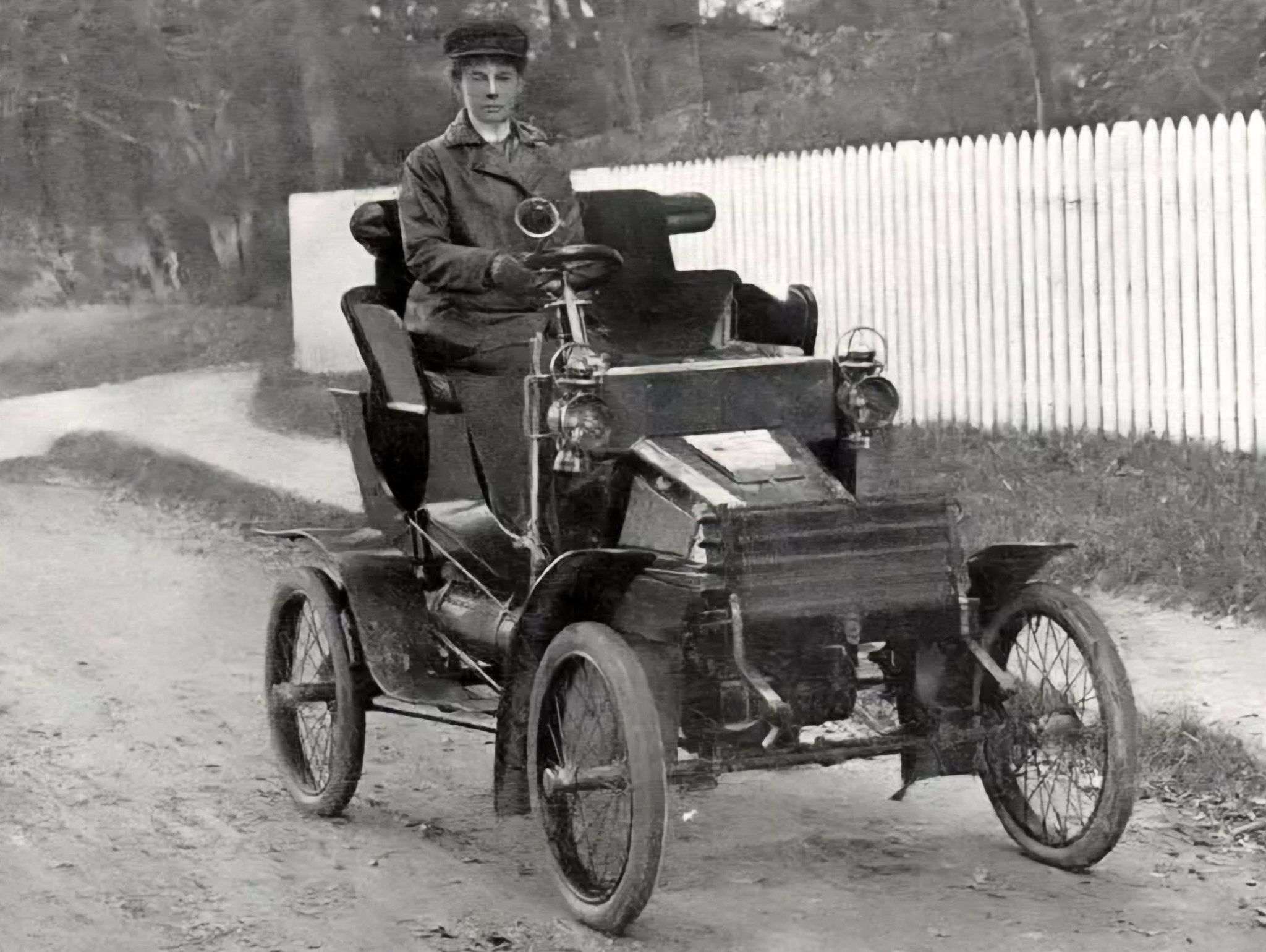
Alice Mabel Paget-Tomlinson at the wheel of her John O'Gaunt motorcar in 1902

The John O'Gaunt was an English automobile manufactured in Lancaster from 1901 until 1904. Built by William Atkinson & Sons, the 4 hp vehicle was "made to meet the requirements of people who do not require a high-priced car".

== See also ==
- List of car manufacturers of the United Kingdom
