= Berkeley (1913) =

Berkeley was a car manufacturer that traded in 1913, building 18 hp (13 kW) cars. The engine was quoted as a 75 mm × 100 mm (3.0 in × 3.9 in) bore and stroke, 1764 cc unit of unknown origin and the nominal list price was £120. Little else is known of them.

== See also ==
- List of car manufacturers of the United Kingdom
