= AEM Scout =

Welsh-built utility vehicle

The AEM (Automotive Engineering and Manufacturing) Scout was a Welsh-built Mini Moke type utility vehicle, with, zinc-coated bodywork and totally different styling not to mention the radically different method of production. It was made for only one year, 1987, in Merthyr Tydfil, South Wales. The running gear was based on the Mini, with a Mini engine, transmission, front subframe and Hydragas suspension.

The Scout, a particularly unsuccessful Mini based kit car had a remarkably chequered history having previously been made by Import Export of Spalding, Lincolnshire between 1983 and 1985 and after the demise of AEM the design was taken up by The Sun Motor Company of Solihull from 1990 to 1991. Six wheel versions were also made.

Universally, fans of genuine Mini Mokes, point out that this is a kit-car, not an updated or unique version of the BMC Mini Moke.

== See also ==
- List of car manufacturers of the United Kingdom
