= W.W. (automobile) =

W.W. (Winter), was an early British car made by Winter and Company of Wandsworth, London. They made two models between 1913 and 1914.

The first car, the W.W. of 1913 was a light car powered by an 8 hp V-twin engine bought in from the Precision company. This drove the rear wheels through a gear box by Chater-Lea and shaft drive to a worm gear final drive on the rear axle.

For 1914 production changed to a cyclecar. This was sold as a Winter and had a Blumfield engine and friction drive with belt to the rear axle.

The number made is not known.

== See also ==
- List of car manufacturers of the United Kingdom
