= Attila (automobile) =

The Attila was an English automobile produced from 1903 to 1906; the car, which was the creation of the Hunslet Engine Company of Leeds, was a three-cylinder 20hp craft.

== See also ==
- List of car manufacturers of the United Kingdom
