= Hewinson-Bell =

The Hewinson-Bell was an English automobile manufactured around 1900. Six crude vehicles, apparently copied from Benzes, were built in the area of Southampton.

== See also ==
- List of car manufacturers of the United Kingdom
