= Gordon (1912–1916) =

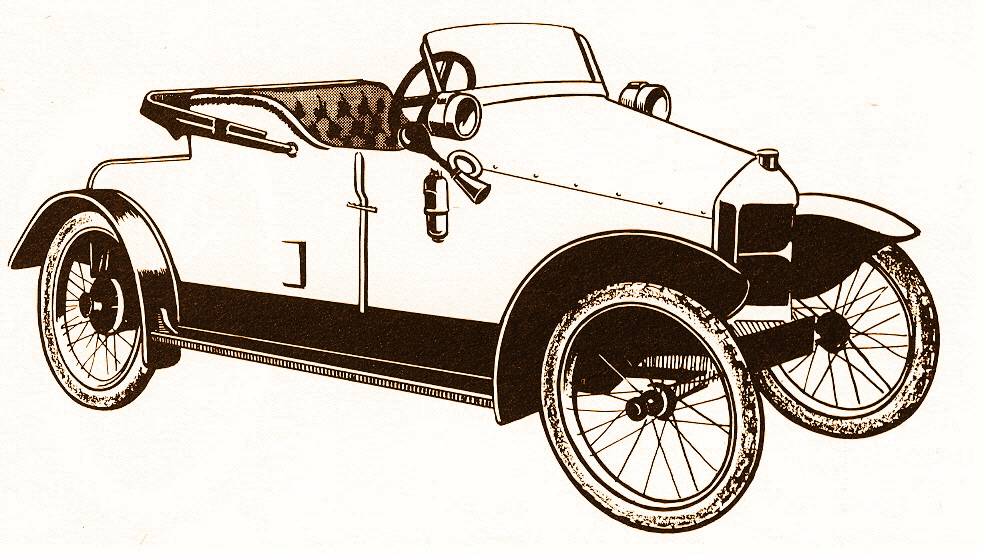
Gordon Cyclecar of 1914

Gordon, Gordon Armstrong, was a British cyclecar produced in Beverley Yorkshire by 'East-Riding Engineering' from 1912 to 1916. Production was halted by World War I.

== History ==
The parent company of East Riding Engineering was the Armstrong Patents Company which still manufactures shock absorbers for cars. Both companies were founded by Gordon Armstrong.

== Models ==
The initial 1912 models had either a two or four seater body and were powered by a 1,100cc 8 hp J.A.P. V-twin engine mounted at the rear, and driving the rear axle via chains. The bodies formed a unitary construction with the chassis. The four seater cycle car was a rarity in the market. The wheelbase was 2438 mm.

In 1914, the Gordon 9 hp replaced the initial model, still using the same engine but on short 2286 mm wheelbase.

In 1914, a second new model, the Gordon 10 hp was introduced with a 1.35 litre engine.

In 1915, a prototype Gordon 10 hp, front-engined vehicle was built. It was equipped with a water-cooled four-cylinder in-line engine with 1,100cc displacement. Both two and four seater wheelbases were available. The model was planned for export to Australia, but volume production was prevented by World War I.

Model	Construction period	Cylinders	Capacity	Wheelbase
8 hp	1912–1913	2 V	1074 cm^{3}	2438 mm
9 hp	1914–1915	2 V	1074 cm^{3}	2286–2438 mm
10 hp	1914–1915	2 V	1357 cm^{3}	2438 mm
10 hp	1915–1916	4 inline	1074 cm^{3}	2286–2438 mm

== See also ==
- List of car manufacturers of the United Kingdom
