= Urecar =

The Urecar was an English automobile manufactured in Bournemouth only in 1923. It was powered by an 8-9 hp four-cylinder Dorman engine; apparently only one was built.

== See also ==
- List of car manufacturers of the United Kingdom
