= Aeroford =

The Aeroford was an English automobile that was manufactured in Bayswater, London from 1920 to 1925. The Aeroford was an attempt to make the Ford Model T more attractive by disguising its appearance with a unique bonnet and radiator grille.

The Aeroford sold from £288 in 1920 before dropping to £168 to £214 by 1925. It was available as a two-seater, four-seater or coupé model.

== See also ==
- List of car manufacturers of the United Kingdom

== Bibliography ==
- David Culshaw & Peter Horrobin: The Complete Catalogue of British Cars 1895–1975. Veloce Publishing plc. Dorchester (1999). ISBN 1-874105-93-6
