= Cumbria Motors =

British cyclecar manufacturer

Cumbria Motors was a British cyclecar manufacturer based in Cockermouth (Cumberland) in 1914.

The Cumbria 8/10 hp Cyclecar had a V-twin engine of 964 cc or 995 cc and the wheelbase was 2,286 mm. The Cumbria 10/12 hp cyclecar had a four-cylinder engine of 1,110 cc and the wheelbase was 2,438 mm.

== Model ==
Model	Construction	Cylinder	Capacity	Wheelbase
8/10 hp	1914	2 V	964–995 cm^{3}	2286 mm
10/12 hp	1914	4 In-line	1110 cm^{3}	2438 mm

== See also ==
- List of car manufacturers of the United Kingdom
