= Astral (1923 automobile) =

The Astral was a car built from 1923 to 1924 by Hertford Engineering Co Ltd, Barking, then in Essex (now in east London), England.

Only one model was made, the 12/40, and although it was short-lived, it had many advanced features. The engine, made in-house, was a 1720 cc four-cylinder with a single overhead camshaft, and the car had brakes on all four wheels. It costs £365 for a two-seater and £375 for a four/five-seat tourer. The number made is not known.

== See also ==
- List of car manufacturers of the United Kingdom
