= Asquith (1901 automobile) =

English automobile

The Asquith was a short-lived English automobile manufactured by William Asquith at his Halifax machine tool works from 1901 to 1902. The car originally had a front-mounted De Dion engine and belt-drive; this last was later replaced by a shaft drive.

== See also ==
- List of car manufacturers of the United Kingdom
