= Christchurch-Campbell =

1922 English automobile

The Christchurch-Campbell was an English automobile manufactured only in 1922 by J Campbell Ltd of Christchurch, Dorset (then in Hampshire), England. An assembled car, it had a 1436 cc 10-8 hp Coventry-Simplex engine and Meadows gearbox. At £495 for a two-seater, it was expensive and fewer than 10 were built.

== See also ==
- List of car manufacturers of the United Kingdom
