= Arsenal (car) =

The Arsenal was an English car manufacturer at St Albans, Hertfordshire, registered 21 October 1898. It folded the next year, in 1899. The Bollée-like tricycle was reputed to be 3½hp. The manufacturer said the car had "practically the control of one of the largest and best-equipped plants of American Automotive Machinery." The tiller-steered car, which could carry "two or three persons, or four children", cost £59.

== See also ==
- List of car manufacturers of the United Kingdom
