= Arbee (automobile) =

1904 English automobile

The Arbee was a short-lived English automobile manufactured in 1904 by Rodgers Brothers, New Kent Road, London; the 6hp two-speed vehicle was advertised as having a "slow-running engine."

== See also ==
- List of car manufacturers of the United Kingdom
