= Dalgliesh-Gullane =

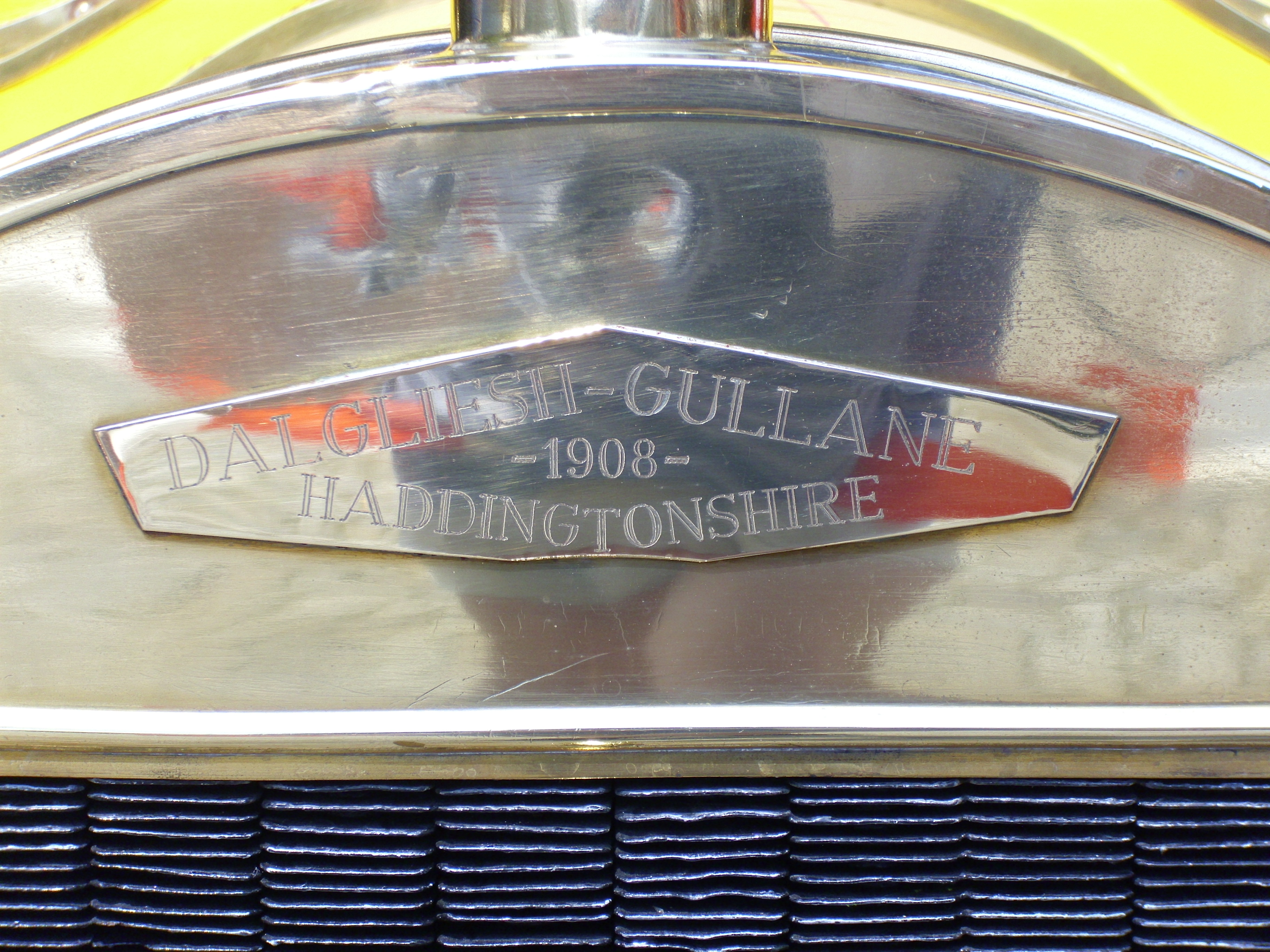
Emblem

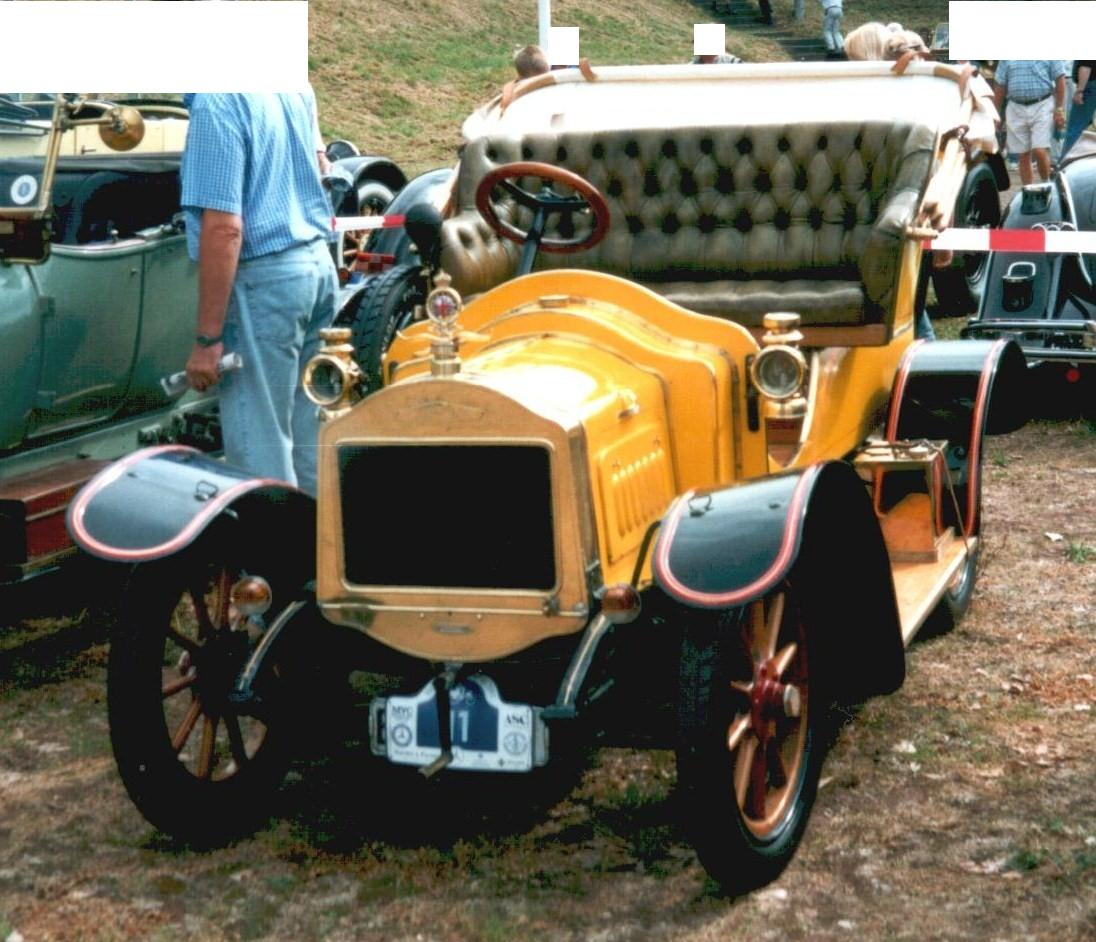
Dalgliesh-Gullane 1908 (2001)

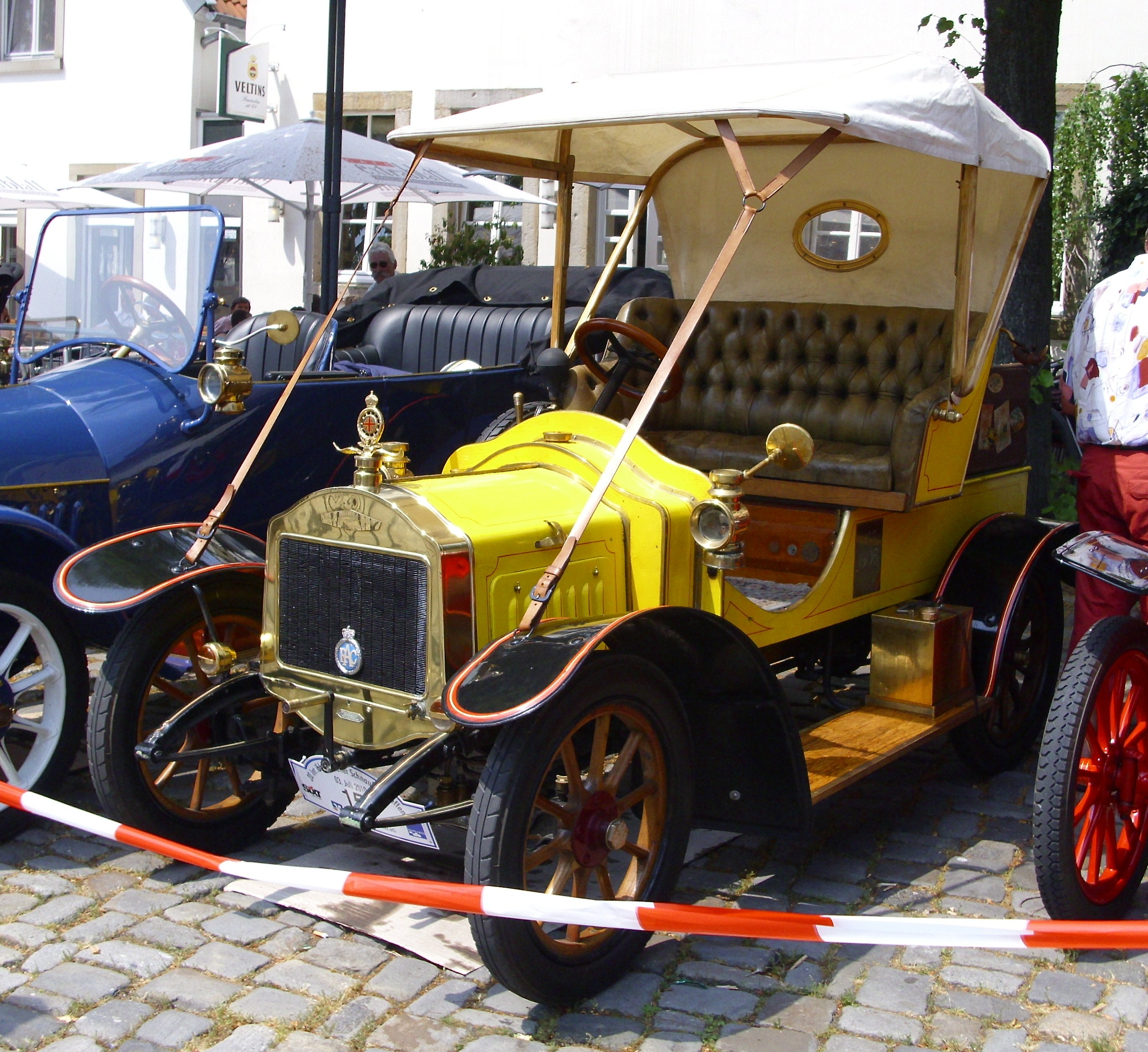
Dalgliesh-Gullane 1908 (2010)

Dalgliesh-Gullane was a Scottish built car made by 'Haddington Motor Engineering' of Haddington, East Lothian from 1907 to 1908. Little is known about this make because it was only produced for a short while. The company was owned by the Shearsmith family.

Only one type was made, a two-seater, and it is thought that only 14 were sold. The car was powered by a single cylinder, 1180 cc, 8 hp De Dion engine at the rear driving through a Cardan shaft which was unusual in those days when chain drive was more common.

Today only one remains.

The vehicle shown on the picture appears to be the same vehicle that appeared in a Spanish Firestone calendar for 1977, (incorrectly being labelled "Dalgleish"), being featured on the Abril, Mayo, Junio (April, May, June) page. In that picture, the vehicle had a white on black number plate "S1231". It had a simpler radiator cap and had red panel decorative lining to the body and bonnet. The seat was simpler with a single circular arc on the sides and had no seat hood.

== See also ==
- List of car manufacturers of the United Kingdom
