= Wyvern Light Car =

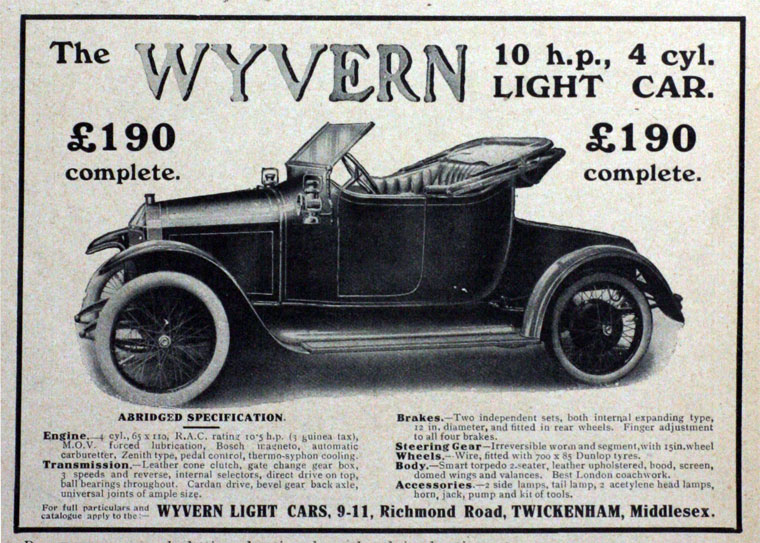
Wyvern Light Car advert in 1913 edition of Cyclecar and Light Car magazine

Wyvern Light Car Co.Ltd. was a British automobile manufacturer which traded from 1913 to 1914 in Twickenham, then in Middlesex (now a part of London). The cyclecar was powered by a four-cylinder, in-line, 10.53 hp. Chapuis-Dornier engine driving the rear wheels.

== See also ==
- List of car manufacturers of the United Kingdom
