= Eadie (automobile) =

Eadie was an English automobile manufactured from 1898 until 1901. A product of Redditch, it was built as either a motor tricycle or quadricycle, and featured a 2¼ De Dion engine.

== See also ==
- List of car manufacturers of the United Kingdom
