= Amazon (automobile) =

The Amazon was a cyclecar produced by Amazon Cars Ltd in Billiter Street, London, EC3, England from 1921 to 1922.

It featured a rear-mounted air-cooled twin 6/9 hp Coventry Victor engine with chain drive to the rear wheels through a three-speed-and-reverse gearbox made by Juckes. To give a conventional appearance the 2-seater car had a dummy radiator at the front.

It cost £235.

== See also ==
- List of car manufacturers of the United Kingdom
