= Winson (cyclecar) =

The Winson was a short lived British cyclecar manufactured by J Winn in Rochdale, Lancashire in 1920 only.

The car could be ordered with an engine made by either Precision or Blackburne with a tax rating of 8 hp. Gearing was provided by a variable friction disk and then by single chain to the rear wheels.

== See also ==
- List of car manufacturers of the United Kingdom
