= Motor Carrier =

The Motor Carrier was an English automobile built only in 1904. Designed as a 6 hp "pleasure car", it could be converted into a goods vehicle capable of carrying 900 lb (400 kg).

== See also ==
- List of car manufacturers of the United Kingdom
