= Hugh Kennedy & Company =

Former Automobile Manufacturer in Scotland

Hugh Kennedy & Company was a Scottish automobile manufacturer, known for the Ailsa model, from 1907 to 1910.

== History ==
Hugh Kennedy founded the company in 1907 in Glasgow and began producing automobiles. Production ended in 1910. Hugh Kennedy was later involved with the Rob Roy automobile

== Cars ==
The Ailsa had a 15/20 HP, front-mounted, four-cylinder engine driving the rear axle. The original price was £395.

== See also ==
- List of car manufacturers of the United Kingdom

== Other sources ==
- Harald Linz, Halwart Schrader: Die Internationale Automobil-Enzyklopädie. United Soft Media Verlag, Munich 2008, ISBN 978-3-8032-9876-8.
- George Nick Georgano (Chefredakteur): The Beaulieu Encyclopedia of the Automobile. Volume 2: G–O. Fitzroy Dearborn Publishers, Chicago 2001, ISBN 1-57958-293-1. (englisch)
