= Vapomobile =

Steam automobile developed in England

The Vapomobile was an early English steam car either manufactured or assembled by the Motor Construction Company in Nottingham between 1902 and 1904. Five, Seven and Twelve horsepower models are known to have been produced with the Twelve horsepower model using an American Mason engine. The two smaller cars had tiller steering.

== See also ==
- List of car manufacturers of the United Kingdom
