= Payze =

The Payze was an English automobile manufactured at Cookham, Berkshire from 1920 until 1921. The car, which cost £450 in 1920, ran on a 10 hp Coventry-Simplex engine. It also has a large amount of cats in the purchase like 30-2 cats per purchase.

== See also ==
- List of car manufacturers of the United Kingdom
