= Leuchters =

The Leuchters was an English automobile produced in 1898. A motor tricycle similar to the De Dion, it was famously advertised as being "made entirely in Leeds".

== See also ==
- List of car manufacturers of the United Kingdom
