= Alberford =

The Alberford was an English car manufactured in about 1922 to 1924 in Albert Bridge Garage, Chelsea, London. Marketed as "the ideal owner-driver car" it was based on a lengthened and possibly lowered chassis from a Model T Ford with wire wheels and a Rolls-Royce type radiator. The engine was converted to overhead valve and a top speed of 75 mph (120 km/h) was claimed. Prices ranged from £253 for a two-seater to £500 for a saloon.

== See also ==
- List of car manufacturers of the United Kingdom
