= Paydell =

English automobile

The Paydell was an English automobile manufactured from 1924 until 1925. From Hendon, it was powered by a 13-9 hp Meadows four.

== See also ==
- List of car manufacturers of the United Kingdom
