= Ralph Gilbert & Son =

- Industry: Car manufacturer
- Founded: 1901; 125 years ago
- Headquarters: Birmingham, England

Ralph Gilbert & Son was a light car manufacturer based in Birmingham, England in 1901.

The light cars were fitted with Gilbert's own single cylinder two stroke horizontal 3.5 hp engine with chain drive to the rear wheels.

== See also ==
- List of car manufacturers of the United Kingdom
