= Bell (cyclecar) =

The Bell is a British 3-wheeled cyclecar that was made in 1920 by W.G. Bell of Rochester, Kent.

The car was a three-wheeler with the single wheel at the front and was powered by a JAP or Precision engine. The cars were advertised, but it is not certain that series production ever started.

== See also ==
- List of car manufacturers of the United Kingdom
