= Arden (automobile) =

British automobile

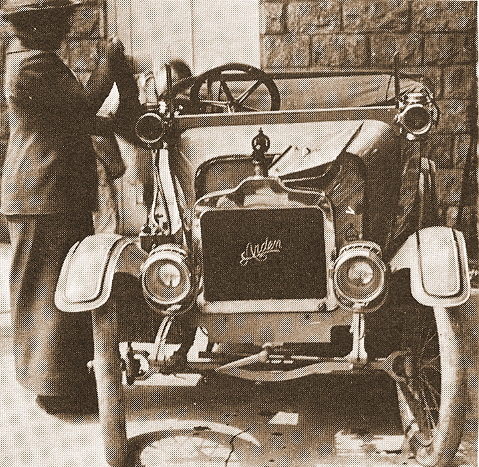
1913 Arden 8-96 hp

The Arden was a British automobile manufactured from 1912 to 1916 in Balsall Common, near Coventry. Starting out as a light and somewhat crude cyclecar, by the time production finished four years later, it had grown into a well-made four-cylinder car, featuring full four-seater coachwork.

The first model in 1912 was a 8 hp V-twin, air-cooled, 898 cc JAP-engined cyclecar with a wooden chassis. This continued in production until 1915.

This was supplemented in 1914 by the 10 hp, with either a water-cooled, Alpha 1104 cc two-cylinder or 1094 cc four-cylinder engine.

A larger car, the 11.9 hp with 1701 cc engine was made in 1916 only.

One Arden, a 1913 Alpha two-cylinder-engined two-seat model, is known to survive.

== See also ==
- List of car manufacturers of the United Kingdom
