= LAD (car) =

British cyclecar made between 1913 and 1926

The LAD was a British cyclecar made between 1913 and 1926.

The car was originally made by the Oakleigh Motor Company of West Dulwich, London and was usually fitted with a single seater body although a few two seaters were made. Power came from a single cylinder Stag engine and drive was to the rear wheels by chain. There was only a single forward speed and no reverse so a gearbox was not used. Production stopped on the outbreak of war.

The car was revived in 1923 by LAD Productions of Farnham, Surrey in 1923 and the original was joined by a 350 cc twin cylinder engined model but the launch of the Austin 7 took away the market for such cars and the company closed in 1926.

== See also ==
- List of car manufacturers of the United Kingdom
