= Karminski =

The Karminski was an English automobile manufactured only in 1902.

The Karminski was the product of a concern from Bradford. The bonnet of the 7 hp car came to a "torpedo point". In 1902 the company claimed that it was unable to supply the similar 12 hp model "owing to a contract by a Russian firm for a great quantity".

== See also ==
- List of car manufacturers of the United Kingdom
