= Joel-Rosenthal =

UK automobile manufacturer

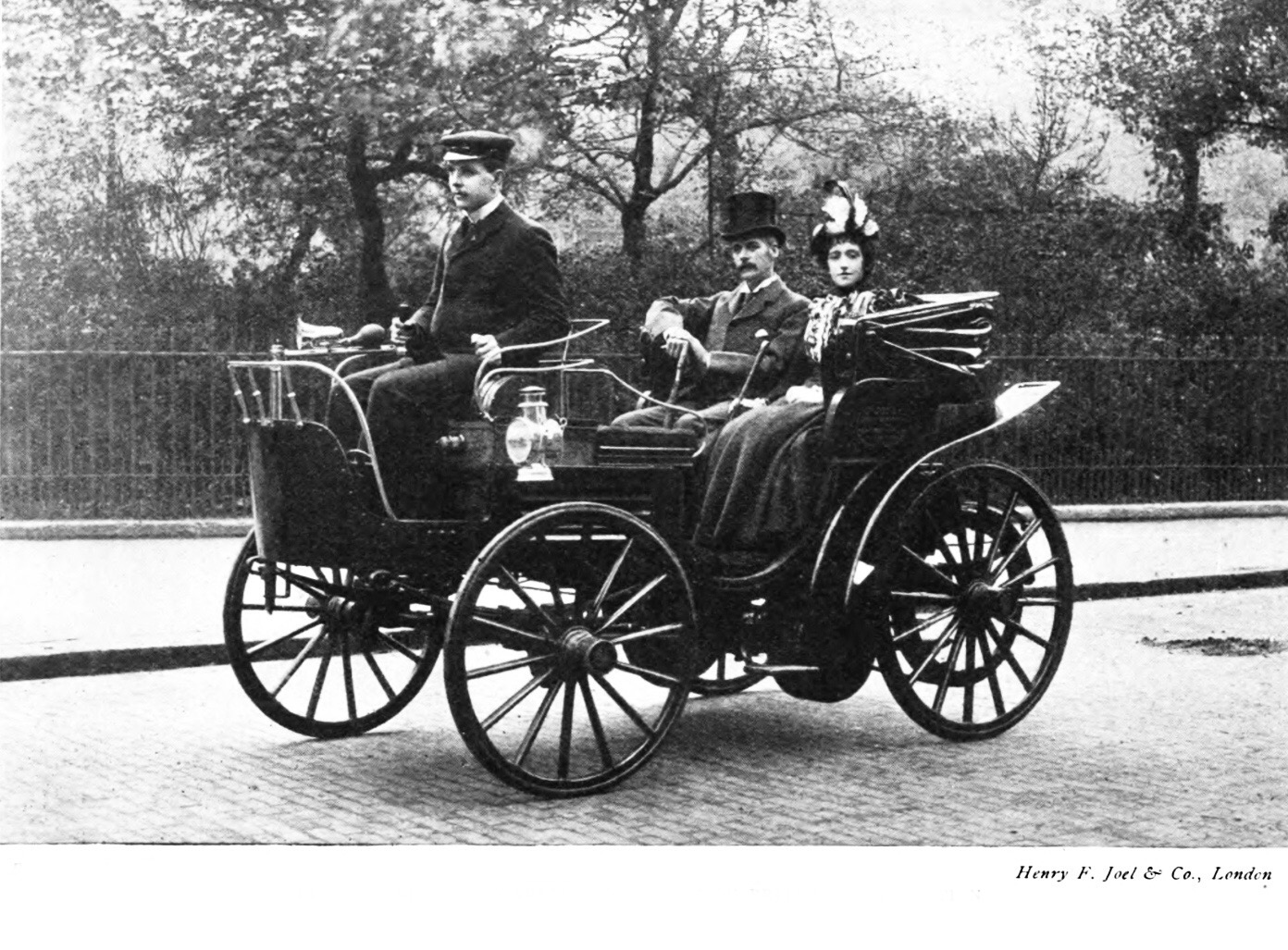
National Motor Carriage Syndicate Joel-Rosenthal (1902).

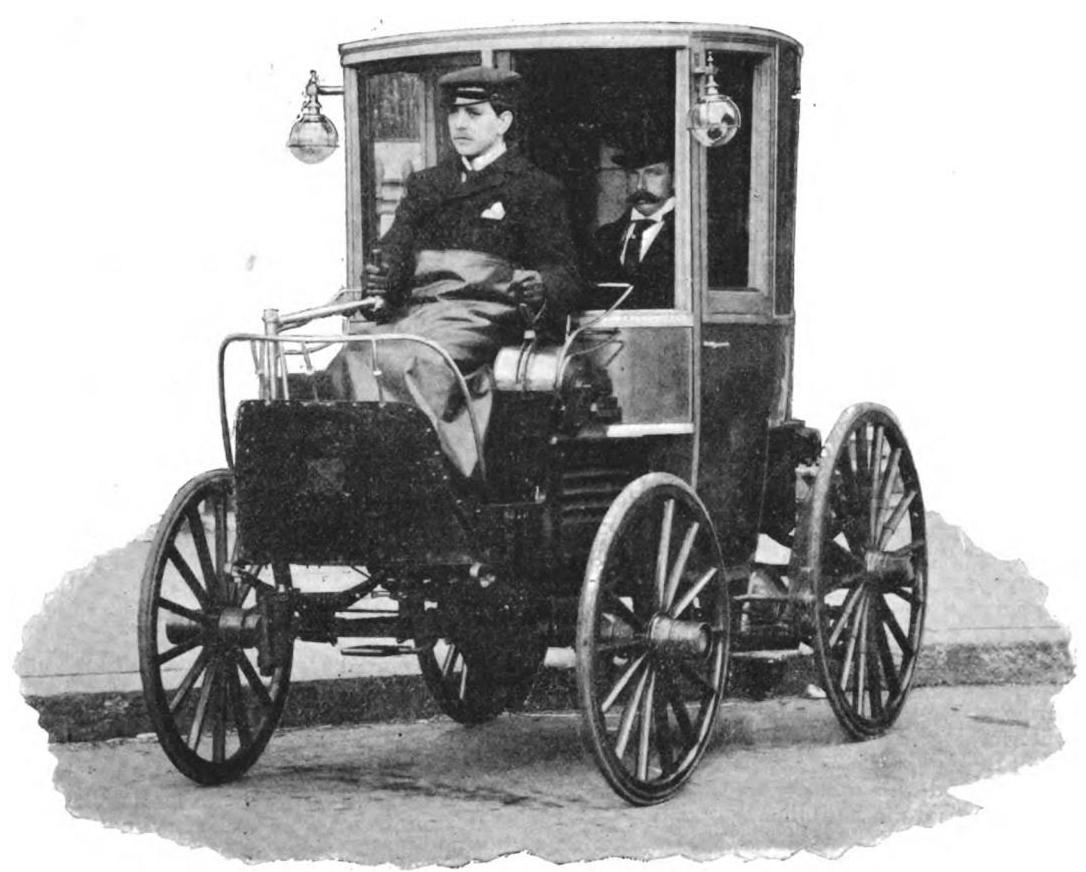
Joel Electrical Motor-Carriage (1899)

The Joel-Rosenthal was an English electric car manufactured from 1899 until around 1902. Designed by Henry M Joel and London-built, the car had a separate 2 hp engine with chain drive for each rear wheel.

== See also ==
- List of car manufacturers of the United Kingdom
