= Black Prince (car) =

British 1920s four-wheeled cyclecar

The Black Prince was a British 4-wheeled cyclecar made in small numbers in 1920 by Black Prince Motors of Barnard Castle, Durham.

The car was designed by H. G. Wright and was available with either a single or twin-cylinder Union air-cooled engine rated at 2.75 horse power. Drive was through a two-speed belt system although gear transmission was an option.

Both the open body and the chassis were made of wood, the flexibility of which was used as suspension.

The number made is unknown but at least two survive.

== See also ==
- List of car manufacturers of the United Kingdom
