= Wigan-Barlow =

The Wigan-Barlow was an English automobile manufactured from 1922 until 1923. With a factory at Lowther Street and David Road Coventry, it was an unsuccessful assembled light car with 1368 cc Coventry Simplex or 1496 cc Meadows engines.

A sports model, the 11/40 with 1795 cc Meadows engine and polished aluminium bodywork was announced in 1922 but came too late to save the company from receivership in October 1922

== See also ==
- List of car manufacturers of the United Kingdom
