= Croxted =

English automobile

The Croxted was an English automobile built from 1904 to 1905 in Herne Hill, South London. The cars were available with either a 10hp engine or a power unit of 14 hp and four cylinders.

== See also ==
- List of car manufacturers of the United Kingdom
