= Gordon (1903–1904) =

Gordon, Gordon Cycle & Motor Company Ltd was a British manufacturer of bicycles and motor cars in 1903 and 1904. It was established on the Seven Sisters Road, north London.

== History ==
Gordon Cycle & Motor Company was established on the Seven Sisters Road, north London in 1903 and production ended in 1904.

== Motorcars ==
The Gordon Miniature was a voiturette with a 6 hp single cylinder engine, two speed transmission and chain drive to the rear axle. It weighed under 488 pounds and was priced at 125 guineas (£131.25).

In 1904 the car was enhanced with a 3 speed gearbox.

== See also ==
- List of car manufacturers of the United Kingdom

== Other sources ==
- Harald Linz, Halwart Schrader: Die Internationale Automobil-Enzyklopädie. United Soft Media Verlag, München 2008, ISBN 978-3-8032-9876-8.
- George Nick Georgano (Chefredakteur): The Beaulieu Encyclopedia of the Automobile. Volume 2: G–O. Fitzroy Dearborn Publishers, Chicago 2001, ISBN 1-57958-293-1. (englisch)
- David Culshaw, Peter Horrobin: The Complete Catalogue of British Cars 1895–1975. Veloce Publishing PLC, Dorchester 1997, ISBN 1-874105-93-6. (englisch)
