= Billings-Burns =

The Billings-Burns was an English automobile built only in 1900 in Coventry. This voiturette designed by E. D. Billings was powered by a 2 1/4 hp De Dion single-cylinder engine mounted in the open at the front of the car. The Burns part of the name came from its intended seller – a Mr. J. Burns based in London.

== See also ==
- List of car manufacturers of the United Kingdom
