= WSC (cyclecar) =

WSC, Wholesale Supply Co. Ltd. was a Scottish automobile manufacturer, established in 1914 in Aberdeen. The cyclecar was marketed under the name of WSC with a V twin J.A.P. engine rated for taxation at 8 hp.

== See also ==
- List of car manufacturers of the United Kingdom

== Sources ==
- Harald Linz and Halwart Schrader: The International Motor encyclopedia. : United Soft Media Verlag GmbH, Munich 2008, ISBN 978-3-8032-9876-8
- Nick Georgano: . The Beaulieu Encyclopedia of the Automobile, Volume 3 P-Z Fitzroy Dearborn Publishers, Chicago 2001, ISBN 1-57958-293-1 (English)
- David Culshaw & Peter Horrobin: The Complete Catalogue of British Cars 1895-1975 . Veloce Publishing plc. Dorchester (1997). ISBN 1-874105-93-6
