= Sports Junior =

The Sports Junior was an English automobile manufactured between 1920 and 1921. A 10 hp two-seater with a four-cylinder Peters engine, it had detachable disc wheels.

== See also ==
- List of car manufacturers of the United Kingdom
