= Atomette =

The Atomette was a British three-wheeled cyclecar manufactured by Allan Thomas in Cleveland Street, Wolverhampton in 1922.

The car was powered by an air-cooled 3.5 hp Villiers two-stroke engine driving the single rear wheel through a three-speed gearbox. The body had no pretence of having a radiator. Prototypes & early cars were single seat and cost 90 guineas (£94.50). Later, cars were made which seated two people side by side. These cost 95 guineas (£99.75). The car could be ordered in a choice of blue, grey or green.

== See also ==
- List of car manufacturers of the United Kingdom
