= Anglo-American (motor tricycle) =

The Anglo-American was an English motor tricycle produced by a York company from 1899 to 1900. The company also offered motors that it claimed were "manufactured throughout in our own works", but which were most likely Continental imports.

== See also ==
- List of car manufacturers of the United Kingdom
