= Laurence-Jackson =

The Laurence-Jackson company of Wolverhampton built a light car in 1920, powered by an 8/10 hp J.A.P. v-twin engine, and featuring friction transmission and chain drive. The only body style offered was an open 2-seater. The car was originally priced at £200, but this rose to £295.

The worldwide distributor was Car Concessionnaires Limited, 72 Regent Street, London, and the London office was at 58 New Compton Street.
