= New British =

Defunct British automobile company

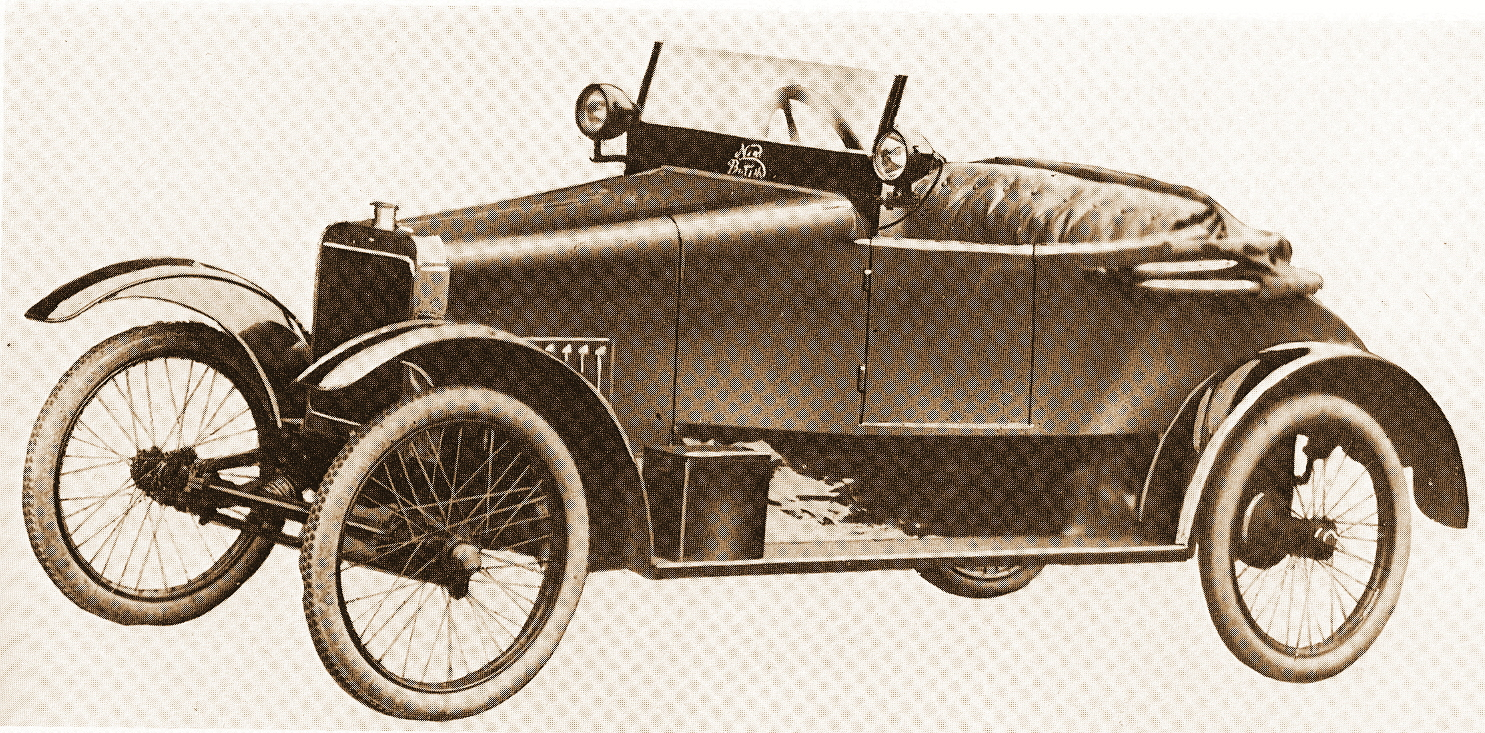
1921 New British

The Charles Willetts Jnr Ltd company of Overend Road, Cradley Heath were a lifting tackle manufacturer who built a light car called the New British between 1921 and 1923 when tackle and winch work was slack.

The New British was launched at the 1921 London Motor Show with a choice of engines. There was a cheaper air-cooled version selling for £205, and the more expensive water-cooled version selling for £215. The New British was powered by a 998cc Blackburne V-twin engine, with friction transmission and chain final drive to a differential-less rear axle. The only body style offered was a 2-seater and the only colour blue. Approximately 100 cars were built before production ceased.
