= Skirrow (car) =

The Skirrow was an English automobile manufactured between 1936 and 1939. A midget racing car produced by Harry Skirrow, based in Ambleside, Cumbria, it used a 1000 cc JAP engine and was noteworthy in having chain drive to all four wheels.
