= Toward & Philipson =

Short-lived English steam car

The Toward & Philipson was an English steam car manufactured for one year only, 1897. It was a coke-fired wagonette with a three-stage tubular boiler, and could seat six.
