= Buckland Cars =

Former British automobile manufacturer

- Industry: Automobiles
- Founded: 1988
- Founder: Dick Buckland
- Defunct: 1999
- Headquarters: Llanwern near Newport

Buckland Cars was a British manufacturer of automobiles.

== Company history ==
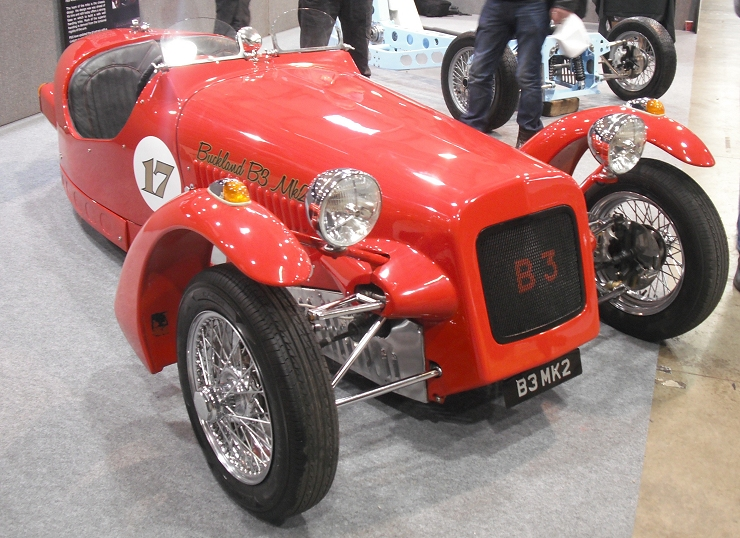
Buckland B3

Dick Buckland developed an automobile and presented it at a kit car show in Stoneleigh in 1985. The production and marketing of automobiles and kits was initially carried out together with Laurie Weeks through the Light Car & Cycle Restoration Company. In 1988 he founded Buckland Cars in his home of Llanwern near Newport, South Wales. The brand name was Buckland. Production ended in 1999 when Dick Buckland fell ill. A total of twelve copies were made.

Penguin Speed Shop from Sarn in Flintshire, led by John Wilcox, has continued production since 2011, retaining the brand name.

== Vehicles ==
The only model was the B 3. It was a tricycle with a single rear wheel. The basis was a tubular frame. An open two-seater body made of fiberglass was mounted on it. A four-cylinder engine from Ford with a displacement of 1300 cm^{3} and an output of 90 to 100hp was located at the front of the vehicle and drove the rear wheel via a chain.
