= Zolfe Orange =

Zolfe car model

Zolfe Classic GTC4
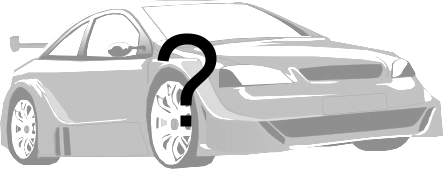

Overview
- Manufacturer: Zolfe
- Model years: 2009

Body and chassis
- Body style: Coupe

The Zolfe Orange is a car announced at the Autosport show in January 2006 built by Zolfe in Redditch, Worcestershire, United Kingdom.

The car has a spaceframe chassis and composite body, with rear-drive. As shown originally the car had a Suzuki motor cycle engine but it was decided to lengthen the wheelbase for greater practicality and production cars have either a Mazda engine or a 2.3-litre Ford Duratec engine in various states of tune up to 300 bhp. The transmission is based on that from a Mazda MX5. A production rate of 30 cars a year is hoped for. A special feature of the car is its very low weight of under 700 kg.

For production cars the name was changed to the Zolfe GTC4. Four variants are offered: the Sprintz is the basic road car; the Speedz is intended for track use and has a six speed gearbox and limited slip differential; the Sportz is a road going version of the Speedz with a little extra comfort and the Zolfster will be an open version of the car.

The company is dissolved on 16 August 2016.
