= Electromobile =

Early 20th century electric car

The Electromobile was an English electric car manufactured from 1901 until 1920. The product of a London company, it was offered as part of a contract hire scheme as early as 1904. From 1903 the engine was mounted on the rear axle. The design of the car changed little until after World War I; in 1919 a new model, the short-bonneted 8/13 hp Elmo electric, appeared.
