= Utopian (automobile) =

The Utopian was an English automobile created in 1914. Built by the Utopian Motor Works of Leicester, the car was powered by a two-cylinder water-cooled engine mounted under its seat. There was a side tiller to assist in steering. Only one car is believed to have been made, for a local clergyman; the company did, however, manufacture bicycles with some success.
