= Ekstromer =

English electric car

The Ekstromer was an English electric car manufactured only in 1905. Produced by a battery manufacturer, it came in a range of models, including a light two-seater which was said to have a 100-mile (160.9 km) range.
