= Edismith =

The Edismith was an English automobile manufactured only in 1905. Built by Edmund Smith of the Circus Garage in Blackburn, Lancashire, they came with either Tony Huber or De Dion power units.
