= Kyma (automobile) =

The Kyma was an English automobile manufactured from 1903 to 1905.

== History ==
Built by the New Kyma Car Company of Peckham, it came in 6 hp (4.5 kW) twin-cylinder models of three and four wheels.

== See also ==
- List of car manufacturers of the United Kingdom
