= Queen (English automobile) =

English automobile

The Queen was an English automobile produced from 1904 to 1905. "The car for the million or the millionaire", it was sold by Horner & Sons of Mitre Square, London. Models of 12 and 16 hp were offered; prices ranged from 235 to 275 guineas.
