= List of steam car makers =

The steam car manufacturers listed here were mostly active during the first period of volume production, roughly 1860–1930, with a peak around 1900. From 1940 onwards, steam cars have tended to be either experimental or prototypes.

The first experimental steam-powered vehicles were built in the 18th and 19th centuries, but it was not until after Richard Trevithick had developed the use of high-pressure steam, around 1800, that mobile steam engines became a practical proposition. The first half of the 19th century saw great progress in steam vehicle design, and by the 1850s it was viable to produce them on a commercial basis. The next sixty years saw continuing improvements in vehicle technology and manufacturing techniques and steam road vehicles were used for many applications. In the 20th century, the rapid development of internal combustion engine technology led to the demise of the steam engine as a source of propulsion of vehicles on a commercial basis prior to World War II. Since then there have been sporadic resurgences of interest in steam, particularly in the late 1960s in California to address air pollution issues and later in response to the 1973 oil crisis.

== 1600s – Concepts ==
Make	Country	Years active	Comments
Grimaldi	Italy	1671	Phillipe-Marie Grimaldi is thought to have followed on from the Belgian model steam vehicle and served as an inspiration for the Italian model steam-powered carriage successor.
Verbiest	Belgium	1665	Ferdinand Verbiest is suggested to have built what may have been the first steam-powered carriage in about 1665, it had a length of 65 cm and was powered by an aeolipile. Both the Belgian model and later the Italian model were little more than toys.

== 1700s – Pioneers ==
Make	Country	Years active	Comments
Cugnot	France	1769	Nicolas-Joseph Cugnot's "machine à feu pour le transport de wagons et surtout de l'artillerie" ("fire engine for transporting wagons and especially artillery") was built in two versions, one in 1769 and one in 1771 for use by the French Army.
Fourness and Ashworth	England	1788	A British patent No.1674 of December 1788 was granted for a steam-powered car.
Murdoch	Scotland	1784	William Murdoch built and operated a steam-powered carriage in model form in 1784. In 1791 he built a larger steam-powered carriage which he had to abandon to do other work.
Nolet	France	1748	It seems that the Belgian vehicle of 1665 served as an inspiration for the French steam-powered carriage successor.
Symington	Scotland	1786	William Symington built a steam-powered carriage in 1786.

== 1800s – Early developments ==
Make	Country	Years active	Comments
Aiken	US	1882	A steam car built by Dr William E Aiken of the University of Maryland.
Amoskeag	US	1872	Amoskeag alongside building locomotives for railroad use also built a self-propelled fire extinguishing steam carriage.
Anderson	Ireland	1829	James C. Anderson built several steam carriages in conjunction with Henry James and later Jasper W. Rogers.
Austin	England	1863	The Austin Steam car was made in 1863.
Blackburn	England	1878	A steam-powered dog-cart.
Blanchard	US	1825	A steam-powered wagon created by Thomas Blanchard of Springfield, Massachusetts.
Bollée	France	1873	Amédée made his first steam vehicle, the 12-seat omnibus L'Obéissante (The Obedient) in 1873. It had two V-twin engines (one each side), each with a chain drive to a rear wheel. In 1878 he produced La Mancelle, a steam-powered Victoria carriage with an in-line twin-cylinder engine at the front, a drive-shaft to a differential under the main seat, and final drive by chains from half-shafts. About 50 were made betweem 1878 and 1881, including 22 by Wöhlert in Berlin.
Bordino	Italy	1854	Colonel Bordino built a steam carriage in 1854.
Božek	Poland/Czech Republic	1815	Josef Božek began construction of a steam carriage in 1814 and completed it 1815. Božek is considered one of the founders of Czech mechanics.
Burstall & Hill	England	1824	Timothy Burstall and John Hill built a steam carriage in 1824.
Callihan	US	1884	Designed by Edward Scott Callihan, it was a tricycle layout with a single spoked wheel in front and two at the rear. The driver sat behind the steam boiler on a seat from a reaper. It was steered it with levers. The top speed was 15 mph. Only one was built.
Catley & Ayres	England	1863	A small three-wheeled vehicle propelled by a horizontal twin cylinder engine which drove the rear axle by spur gearing, only one rear wheel was driven, the other turning freely on the axle.
Carhart	US	1871	A steam buggy made by Dr J.W. Carhart of Racine, Wisconsin.
Cooke & Sons	England	1865	York
Copeland	US	1887	Made a steam-powered bicycle and a three wheeler. Only prototypes made.
Curtis	US	1867	In 1866 Francis Curtis, Newburyport, Massachusetts invented a steam engine attached to a piece of fire fighting equipment. Curtis demonstrated it to Nehemiah Bean, who went on to design the steam-powered Amoskeag fire wagon. The following year Curtis built a steam passenger carriage for an unnamed client. The client did not pay, and Curits made the first repossession in American history. During the initial testing of the carriage a warrant was issued for Curtis' arrest. To escape the arresting officer, Curtis made the first getaway by car in American history.
De Dion-Bouton et Trepardoux	France	1883–1904	The company was renamed De Dion-Bouton, after Trepardoux withdrew in 1894 over the use of petrol engines. The last steam-powered cars were made in 1904. The company lasted until the 1950s.
Dudgeon	US	1859	Robert Dudgeon of New York made a steam-powered carriage to take his family to church. The carriage was described as noisy and costly to run. It was abandoned.
Evans	US	1805	In 1805 Oliver Evans built the Oruktor amphibolos (literally Amphibious digger), a steam-powered, flat bottomed dredger that he modified to be self-propelled on both water and land. The dredger was not a success, and after a few years lying idle, was dismantled for parts.
Field	US	1879	A steam car built by Edwin F Field of Lewiston, who later went on to superintend the Skene American Automobile Company.
Fisher	US	1859	A one off steam carriage designed by J H Fisher and built by Danforth, Cooke & Co. Fisher continued to work on the carriage until his death in 1873.
Fowler	England	1862	John Fowler built a steam car in 1862.
Grenville	England	1875–1880	It was designed about 1875 by Robert Grenville of Glastonbury with some assistance from his friend George Jackson Churchward.
Griffith	England	1821	Julius Griffith built a steam carriage in 1821.
Gurney	England	1827	Goldsworthy Gurney built a steam coach in 1827.
Hancock	England	1829	Walter Hancock in 1829 built a 10 seat steam bus called the Infant.
Hills	US	1868	A steam-powered buggy later converted to petrol made by James Hills of Fleetwood.
Holt	England	1866	H.P. Holt made a three wheel light steam carriage.
Inshaw	England	1881	John Inshaw built a steam car in 1881.
Jacquot	France	1878	Designed and built by Louis Lejeune.
James	England	1829	See Anderson.
Kemna	Germany	1871	In 1871 Julius Kemna started selling English steam threshing systems. A couple of years later Kemna started producing various other steam-powered vehicles (such as road rollers) but also high quality steam ploughing engines and road steamers.
Knight	England	1868–1870	In 1868–1870 John Henry Knight of Farnham built a four-wheeled steam carriage which originally only had a single-cylinder engine.
Long	US	1880	The Long steam tricycle was built by George A. Long around 1880 and patented in 1883. One example was built.
Lotz	France	1860	Lotz in 1860 built a steam car called the L'Eclair.
Macerone	England	1832	Colonel Francis Macerone built a steam carriage in 1832.
Manzetti	Italy	1864	In 1864 Italian inventor Innocenzo Manzetti, associated with Serpolett, built a road steamer. It had the boiler at the front and a single cylinder engine.
Manton	US	1866	An experimental coal-burning steamer built by Joseph P Manton of Providence, Rhode Island.
Mason	US	1885–1897	William B Mason of the Mason Regulator Company (now a subsidiary of Dresser Industries) made his first steam carriage in 1885. He made a second car in July 1897. Both these vehicles were used as test beds for his steam engines.
Mérelle	France	1889	Fernand Mérelle was the concessionaire for De Dion and Bouton at the 1889 Exposition Universelle in Paris and cars were sold under that name.
Nairn	Scotland	1870	Nairn built a steam bus in 1870.
Olds	US	1886–1894	Ransom Old's is reputed to have made his first steam-powered car in 1886. He did make the first car exported from the United States in 1893. It was steam powered and destined for India. However, the ship sank and the car was never delivered.
Pagani	Italy	1830	Luigi Pagani built a steam car in 1830.
Peugeot	France	1889	The first Peugeot automobile was a three-wheeled steam-powered car designed by Léon Serpollet and was produced in 1889, only four examples were made.
Randolph	Scotland	1872	In 1872 a steam bus by Charles Randolph of Glasgow weighed four and a half tons, was 15 feet (5 m) in length, but had a maximum speed of only 6 miles per hour. Two vertical twin cylinder engines were independent of one another and each drove one of the rear wheels by spur gearing. The entire vehicle was enclosed and fitted with windows all around and carried six people.
Rickett	England	1854–1860	Rickett made ploughs and steam engines. In 1858 he created a steam-powered plough. This inspired the Marquess of Stafford to order a steam car. This vehicle had a rear mounted coal fire boiler with a two cylinder engine and three wheels, the single wheel at the front. He made a second vehicle for the Earl of Caithness in 1860. These were potentially England's first cars.
Roberts	US	1884	A steam car made by John H Roberts of Providence, Rhode Island.
Rogers	Ireland	1829	See Anderson.
Roper	US	1861–1894	Sylvester H. Roper drove around Boston, Massachusetts on a steam car he invented in 1863. One of his 1863 cars went to the Henry Ford Museum, where, in 1972, it was the oldest car in the collection.
Russel	Scotland	1834	John Scott Russell built a steam carriage in 1834.
Santler	England	1889	In 1887 the Santler brothers designed a small steam engine that they had running in 1889 and installed in a four wheeled chassis.
Scott	New Zealand	1881	Robert Julian Scott's steam-powered buggy built by Cutten and Co, Dunedin.
Serpollet	France	1887–1898	Léon Serpollet's first steam cars were sold under his own name, before the partnership as Gardner-Serpollet. Serpollet is credited with inventing the flash boiler.
Spencer	US	1862–1904	Christopher Spencer built a steam buggy in Connecticut. He continued making steam vehicles with his last being delivery vans for a New York dairy.
Squire	England	1843	John Squire built a steam bus in 1843.
Summers & Ogle	England	1830-1831	In around 1830-1831 William Alltoft Summers and Nathaniel Ogle based at the Iron Foundry, Millbrook, Southampton, made two three-wheeled steam carriages.
Taylor	Canada	1867	The Henry Seth Taylor steam buggy was the first known car built in Canada. It was built by Henry Seth Taylor, a watchmaker and jeweller in Stanstead, Quebec in 1867. It was unveiled at the Stanstead Fall Fair that year.
Thomson	Scotland	1869	In 1869 the road steamer built by Robert William Thomson of Edinburgh became famous because its wheels were shod with heavy solid rubber tyres.
Thury	Switzerland	1879	In 1879 René Thury made a steam-powered tricycle.
Trevithick	England	1803	In 1803 Richard Trevithick built the London Steam Carriage that ran successfully in London in 1803, but the venture failed to attract interest and soon folded up.
Whitney	US	1885–1898	George Eli Whitney of the East Boston Whitney Motor Wagon Company began to make a steam motor vehicle in 1885 when he partly built one. In 1895 he began again and completed the 650 lb carriage in October 1896. He built several more machines after that date. Whitney had gained experience while working on the Roper steam velocipede. For a short time Whitney's were manufactured by the Stanley Manufacturing Company as Stanley-Whitney's and by Everett Motor Carriage Company as Everett's In 1899 Whitney sold the rights to a higher powered version of his car to Brown Brothers of England.
Yarrow & Hilditch	England	1861	Alfred Yarrow and James Bracebridge Hilditch built a steam car in 1861.

== 1890s – Commercial manufacture ==
Make	Country	Years active	Comments
American Waltham	US	1898–1899	The American Waltham was produced from 1898 to 1899 by the American Waltham Manufacturing Co., a bicycle firm based in Waltham, Massachusetts. It was a typical light steam buggy with a two cylinder engine under the seat, cycle type wheels and tiller steering.
Baldwin	US	1899–1905	The Baldwin Automobile Manufacturing Company made steam runabouts at Connellsville from at least July 1899. By 1901 the company was in receivership, but continued trading till about 1905. The relationship between these cars and Leo Baldwin's is unknown, although they may be the same.
Baldwin	US	1899–1901	A steam buggy made by Leo F.N. Baldwin's Baldwin Automobile Company, of Providence. He moved to Connellsville in March 1900 and built the Baldwin there until 1901. He then returned to Providence and continued manufacturing under the Baldwin Motor Wagon Company until 1902. Closing his factory that year, Leo Baldwin went on to sell steamers and later race Stanley's. Also see Cruickshank and Cross below.
Best	US	1898	Daniel Best of the Best Manufacturing Company, San Leandro made an experimental automobile in 1898 but decided not to put it into production. He also built a runabout for personal use. The company made traction engines and its factory was later sold to Holt now part of Caterpillar.
Black	US	1891	In 1891 Charles H Black completed and tested his first steam-powered "chug buggy". However, he rejected the steam engine for use in an automobile as being "too cumbersome and hard to manage" and continued to search for a more suitable engine.
Brown-Whitney	England	1899–1900	See Whitney.
Buard	France	1896–1914	Concentrated on steam-powered bicycles.
Burgett & West	US	1899	C.E. Burgett and William S West of Middleburgh, New York made a steam car prototype. This vehicle was exhibited in 1901 at the Schoharie County Fairgrounds. No more were known to have been made.
Cederholm	Sweden	1892	Painter Joens Cederholm and his brother, André, a blacksmith, designed their first car, a two seater, introducing a condensor in 1894. It was not a success.
Century	US	1899–1903	Century Motor Vehicle Company (1899–1903) was a manufacturer of electric and steam automobiles in Syracuse, New York. The company switched to gasoline-fuelled internal combustion engine-powered automobiles in January 1903, and went out of business later that year.
Clark	US	1895–1909	Edward S Clark made several experimental steam-powered wagons in Boston before in 1900 he began manufacturing steam cars at Dorchester. His steam engine was a horizontally opposed 20 hp 4 cylinder engines of 20 hp which was centrally mounted and had the flash boiler located at the front. He also made steam-powered delivery wagons.
Clarkson	England	1899–1902	
Cross	US	1897	Only one Cross was made. LFN Baldwin of the Cruickshank Engine Works, Providence, Rhode Island made the steam engine, Alonza Cross of the Cross Writing Instrument Company made the chassis, and the body was made by H M Howe, a carriage maker. It was the first car made in Rhode Island. Construction began in October 1897 and its first trial run was in March 1898.
Crouch	US	1897–1899	Three steam-powered cars are believed to have been made by W E Crouch, a machinist from New Brighton, Pennsylvania. His third and final car made in Baltlimore still exists and is believed to have been made from parts used in his first two vehicles. The steam engine is thought to be a converted marine engine. The car's body was an angle iron frame with aluminum cladding.
Cruickshank	US	1896	Cruickshank Engine Company made steam carriages to order. Alonza Cross was probably a Cruickshank's as Leo F N Baldwin who constructed the engine was employed by them. Baldwin went on to set up his own firm in 1899.
Dyke	US	1899–1904	A steam kit car produced by A L Dyke Auto Supply Company of St. Louis. When the company ceased making steam cars, it became a publisher.
Eclipse	US	1900-1903	Small steam runabout designed by Everett Cameron.
Ernest Ofeldt	US	1898	See Ofeldt.
Eclipse	US	1899–1903	Eclipse Automobile Company bodies were made in Amesbury by Currier, Cameron and Company.
Electrobat	US	1895–1897	See Salom and Morris.
Ellis	England	1899–1902	Probably prototypes only.
Europeenne	France	1899–1901 (possibly as late as 1905)	In early 1899 La Societe Europeene d' Automobiles made a two-seat runabout and a four-seat dogcart. The patent was in the names of Tatin and Taniere.
Everett	US	1899	See Whitney.
Fawcett-Folwer	England	1897	A steam car produced by Fawcett Preston & Co. Ltd.
Gaeth	US	1898	An experimental steam car. Paul Gaeth went on to make petrol engined cars at Cleveland, Ohio from 1902 to 1911.
Gardner-Serpollet (See Serpollet)	France	1899–1907	Serpollet's were made up to 1899, when the Frank Gardner became involved and the make changed to Gardner-Serpollet. The first cars sold under the new name were in 1900.
Gautier–Wehrlé	France	1894–1898	Their first cars were steam powered but by 1898 they were using petrol engines.
Grout	US	1899–1905	Their first cars were called New Home. Manufacturing was located in Orange, Massachusetts and the company run by Carl, Fred and C.B. Grout in partnership with Thomas H. White. William L. Grout, their father, set up the company. The name changed to Grout in 1899.
Hartley	US	1895–1899	The Harley Power Supply Company made a cart powered by a rotary steam engine. It participated in the 1895 Chicago Times Herald motor race. The company withdrew from vehicle manufacture in 1899.
House	England	1899–1902	See Lifu.
Hughes & Atkin	US	1899–1903	Made by William Hughes and Joseph W Atkin of the Rhode Island Auto Carriage Company. Made about 14 steam-powered carriages.
Kensington	US	1899–1902	The Kensington Automobile Manufacturing Company manufactured steam cars until 1902. In 1903 the company went out of business after unsuccessfully seeking a licence to manufacture Darracq's.
Keystone	US	1899–1900	The Keystone Match and Machine Company of Lebanon, Pennsylvania made three cylinder steam-powered cars until 1900, when it returned to manufacturing matches and machinery.
Lamplough	England	1896	A shaft-driven steamer created by Frederick Lamplough who went on to make a steam-powered car in 1903 for Albany Manufacturing.
Lancashire Steam Motor Company	England	1898	
Lane	US	1899–1910	Manufactured in Poughkeepsie, New York. The Lane Motor Vehicle Company initially produced a 30-horsepower vehicle that could carry six people. The vehicle weighed 3,200 pounds, had a steel frame, a detachable aluminum body, and could obtain a speed of 15 mph. Manufacturing of the vehicle began in 1902 at a price of $2,250. In 1909, Lane sold 150 vehicles. Production of the vehicles ended in 1912 due to high cost of production and the company focused on its primary products which included barn door hangers and automobile jacks.
Leach	US	1899–1901	A 2 seat or 4 seat buggy for use on good roads.
Le Blant	France	1894-	
Lifu	England	1899–1902	House and Lifu steam cars designed by Henry Alonzo House were manufactured by Liquid Fuel Engineering Company of East Cowes, Isle of Wight. The cars may have been manufactured under license. Most Lifu steam-powered vehicles were commercial trucks, buses and vans. House had made a steam carriage with his brother in 1866.
Locomobile	US	1899–1903	Locomobile acquired the right to make Stanley's in 1899. They were a well known lightweight and relatively low-cost steam car, although widely criticised for poor performance. In 1904 Locomobile switched to gasoline engines. The company remained in business until the 1920s.
Loomis	US	1896	A single steam-powered car made by Gilbert J Loomis. In 1900 Loomis went on to build a line of gasoline powered cars.
Malden	US	1898	Light steam cars made by the Malden Automobile Company of Malden.
Malevez	Belgium	1898–1908	Malevez were agents for Lifu commercial steam-powered vehicles. They are known to have manufactured cars, but sources do not state their motive power.
Marlboro	US	1899–1902	The Marlboro Steam Stanhope was built by Orrin P Walker of Boston with assistance from William B Mason who provided the engines. The car was similar in design to Locomobile's and Stanley's of the period. After an initial period of success the company ceased trading in 1903.
Marsh	US	1899	Marsh Motor Carriage Co, Brockton, Massachusetts.
Mason	US	1898–1899	William B Mason of Milton, Massachusetts.
Miesse	Belgium	1896–1926	The first Miesse steam car La Torpille was made in 1896 by Jules Miesse. In 1903 the company licensed Turner's of England to manufacture its cars under licence. These were marketed as Turner-Miesse. In 1910 the company branched into steam-powered commercial vehicles. The final steam cars were made in 1926, and many were used as taxis in Brussels. From that point forward the focus was on petrol and diesel engine commercial vehicles.
Mobile	US	1899–1903	The Mobile Company of America was founded by John Brisben Walker in 1899 after a fallout with Locomobile's Amzi L. Barber, whose financing had earlier allowed Walker to purchase the Stanley Steamer concern. By 1903, the Mobile Company of America was out of business.
Montier & Gillet	France	1897	The Montier & Gillet was a French automobile manufacture only in 1897. A steam Wagonette steered by a tiller featured an odd-looking boiler.
Morris Salom	US	1895 1897	Salom and Morris of Philidelpia.
New England	US	1899–1900	The New England Motor Carriage Company made a steam-powered runabout. It was lever steered. The company began manufacturing Comet bicycles and sold the steam car business to Stanton Company.
New Home	US	1897–1898	See Grout.
Ofeldt	US	1899–1902	F.W. Ofeldt and Sons built steam cars in Brooklyn, New York from 1899 to 1900 and Newark, New Jersey from 1901 to 1902. The first cars were also known as Ernest and Ofeldt.
Orient	US	1898–1899	A steam buggy made by Waltham's.
Ovenden	US	1899	W C Ovenden of West Boylston made a light steam buggy. Only one was sold.
Overman	US	1899–1904	Overman Wheel Company, later the Overman Automobile Company of Chicopee Falls MA. See Victor.
Pecori	Italy	1891	Enrico Pecori built a steam tricycle in 1891.
Rand & Harvey	US	1899	A light steam buggy made in Lewiston. Probably only a prototype.
Salvesen	Scotland	1897	A one-off steam cart made for a Norwegian who commissioned it for use around his Scottish estate near Grangemouth.
Schöche	Germany	1895	Gustav Adolf Schöche in 1895 designed a steam car.
Scotte	France	1892–1901	A steam car that competed in the 1894 Paris to Rouen car race. No further detail is known.
Shaver	US	1895	A steam buggy made by Joseph Shaver of Milwaukee. Only one was made.
Shearer	Australia	1898	Australia's first indigenous automobile. It was capable of 15 miles per hour on the streets of Adelaide, South Australia. The boiler was a horizontal design of the semi flash type. Steering was by a tiller type design and a photograph of the vehicle shows it carrying eight passengers.
Simmonds	US	1893	A two seat steam carriage that ran on bicycle wheels.
Simpson	England	1897–1904	A series of experimental vehicles made by John Simpson of Stirling.
Squier	US	1899	A small steam carriage built by W E Squier of Virginia City.
Stanley	US	1897–1924	The twins Francis E Stanley and Freelan O Stanley produced their first car in 1897. During 1898 and 1899 they produced and sold over 200 cars and then sold rights to Locomobile. In 1902 they formed the Stanley Motor Carriage Company which operated from 1902 to 1924. The cars made by the company were colloquially called Stanley Steamers, although several different models were produced. A Stanley Steamer set the world record for the fastest mile in an automobile (28.2 seconds) in 1906. The record for steam-powered automobiles was not broken until 2009.
Stanley-Whitney (also called only Whitney)	US	1899	See Whitney.
Steam Carriage and Wagon Company	England	1899-?	
Strathmore	US	1899–1902	Two types of car were made by the Strathmore Automobile Company of Boston. The company was founded as the International Automobile Company but changed its name in 1901.
Sweany	US	1895	Only a prototype was made by Charles S Caffrey Co for Dr F.L. Sweaney of Philadelphia. The car had four small steam motors, one driving each wheel, that could be driven individually or in combination. One, two, three or four wheel drive could be selected by moving a lever. The car weighed 1350 pounds. It had a foot brake that also cut off the steam and steam power steering.
Terwilliger	US	1898–1903	A series of prototypes made by William H. Terwilliger prior to launching the Empire Auto Company of Amsterdam, New York in 1904.
Thomson	Australia	1896–1901	Herbert Thomson of Armadale, Melbourne, built steam cars around 1900. He tested them on the hill of Kooyong Road in nearby Caulfield, where in 1971 the Pritchard steam car was also tested.
Tinker & Piper	US	1898–1899	See Waltham.
Toward & Philipson	England	1897	A coke fire wagonette with a three stage tubular boiler, and that could seat six. It was made in a joint venture between Toward and Company engineers of St Lawrence and Atkinson and Philipson, Newcastle carriage manufacturers of Tyneside.
Victor	US	1899–1904	In 1899 A H Overman of Chicopee Falls, a bicycle manufacturer, made a steam car called the Victor. Overman named his steam car after the bicycles he made. In 1901 Overman reorganized his company as The Overman Automobile Co and continued to produce the Victor Steam Carriage. About 50 were made by 1901. In 1904 Overman merged with Locomobile.
Waltham	US	1898–1903	In 1898 engineers George M Tinker and John W Piper of the Waltham Manufacturing Company build a light steam buggy. It was exhibited at the 1898 Boston Automobile Show in 1898. Two more steam cars were built under the Tinker and Piper name. In 1899 Tinker and Piper set up the Waltham Automobile Company which made steam cars until 1902 or 1903.
Waverley	US	1896–1901 and 1909–1916	Waverley Co of Indianapolis became International Motor Car Co in 1901 and revived in 1909.
West & Burgett	US	1899	See Burgett and West.
Weston	England	1897–1905	Rebadged Grouts sold in England under licence.

== 1900 to 1913 – Volume production ==
The early years of the 20th century, prior to World War I, were the heyday of the steam car.

Make	Country	Years active	Comments
Albany-Lamplough	England	1903	Designed by Frederick Lamplough and better known as the Lamplough-Albany, it was only made in 1903. Albany also made petrol powered cars.
Altmann	Germany	1905–1907	The Altmann was an automobile made by Kraftfahrzeug-Werke GmbH, Brandenburg-Havel from 1905 to 1907. See also the American Aultman.
AMC	England	1900–1910	The Automobile Manufacturing Company (AMC) was a short-lived British steam car manufactured in London around 1900. to 1910.
Anderson	US	1901–1902	Steam cars made by the Anderson Steam Carriage Company of Anderson.
Arden	England	1908	Steam cars made by the Arden Steam Car Company, Halifax probably not produced commercially.
Artzberger	US	1903–1905	See Foster.
Aultman	US	1901–1902	The Aultman was a 1901 American automobile manufactured in Canton, Ohio.
Ball	US	1902	Miami Cycle and Manufacturing Company Middletown Ohio.
Barton	US	1903	Barton Boiler Company Chicago, Illinois made steam cars to order.
Binney & Burnham	US	1901–1902	A steam automobile built in Boston from 1901 to 1902 by James L Binney and John Appleton Burnham.
Bliss	US	1901	A steam car made by the Bliss Chainless Automobile Company of Attenborough. The drive train was spur geared to the rear axle rather than chain drive.
Bolsover	England	1902	Only made a prototype. No production model made. Best known as makers of the Bolsover Express boiler, used for steam launches and as a replacement boiler for Stanley steam cars.
Bon-Car	England	1905–1907	No series production cars made.
Boss	US	1903–1907	A steam car made by the Boss Knitting Machine Works of Reading.
Brecht	US	1901–1903	Steam-powered cars made by the Brecht Automobile Company of St Louis.
Breer	US	1900	A steam-powered car made by Carl Breer, an engineer who later went on to work for Chrysler and is credited with providing much of the aerodynamic design to the Chrysler Airflow.
Buffard	France	1900–1902	Details unknown—named in list of steam car makes.
California	US	1903–1905	Maker of steam, electric, and gasoline automobiles based in San Francisco.
Campbell	Australia	1901	A steam car made by Archie M Campbell of Liverpool Street, Hobart.
Cannon	US	1902–1906	Details unknown—named in list of steam car makes.
Capitol	US	1902–1903	A steam built by the Capitol Automobile Company of Washington DC and based on a Frank Goodwin model developed from experiments that commenced in 1889.
Central	US	1905–1906	A rotary steam engine powered vehicle made by the Central Automobile Company of Providence, Rhode Island.
Chaboche	France	1901–1906	Chaboche made steam cars and a steam wagon with a 2.5 ton carrying capacity.
Chautauqua	US	1911	A car made by the Chautauqua Motor Company, Dunkirk, New York.
Chelmsford	England	1901–1903	The company exhibited two cars and a van at the 1903 motor show. They were made at the Moulsham Works in Chelmsford. Chelmsford also built many steam buses.
Chicago	US	1905–1907	A steam car made by the Chicago Automobile Company.
Cincinnati	US	1903–1905	A two seat steam-powered car made by the Cincinnati Automobile Company of Ohia.
Clark	US	1900–1909	Advanced flash boiler steam cars made by Edward S Clark Steam Automobiles of Dorchester.
Cloughley	US	1902–1903	A four seat steam-powered surrey made by the Coughley Motor Vehicle Company of Parsons.
Connor	Switzerland	1903	Named in list of steam cars—details unknown.
Conrad	US	1900–1924	A variety of 2 seat and 4 seat models plus a dos-a-dos.
Cook	England	1901–1902	Named in list of steam cars—details unknown.
Cotta	US	1901–1903	A 4 wheel drive and steering steam car made by Charles Cotta's Cotta Automobile Company of Lanark, Illinois.
Covert	US	1901–1907	B.V. Covert and Company was a manufacturer of automobiles in Lockport, New York from 1901 to 1907. The company started as a manufacturer of steam-powered cars, but later switched to gas-powered vehicles. Some Coverts were exported to England as Covert-Jacksons.
Cremorne	England	1903–1904	A steam car made by the Cremorne Motor Manufacturing Company of Chelsea.
Crompton	US	1903–1905	A steam car made by the Crompton Motor Carriage Company of Worcester.
Dawson	US	1900–1902	A steam car made by George Dawson's Dawson Manufacturing Company at Waynesboro (then known as Basic City). Only one was completed and sold.
Desberon	US	1901–1904	The Desberon was an American automobile manufactured from 1901 until 1904. The company initially built steam trucks, and later branched out into making 4 hp gas-driven "pleasure carriages" built along "French lines".
Doble	US	1906–1930	The first Doble was made from wrecked White with a Doble steam engine. Two more prototypes were made with production starting with the Model B. The most technically sophisticated of the steam car manufacturers. Even after they had been supplanted by petrol engines for use in automobiles, Abner Doble continued to sell his experience in designing water-tube boilers to railway locomotive manufacturers, such as Sentinel.
Eastman	US	1900–1903	Henry Eastman and Jay Hayes formed the Eastman Automobile Company in Cleveland to make steam cars. At the end of 1900 Eastman and Hayes sold the company to the Benson Automobile Company.
Eclipse	US	1900–1903	Eclipse Automobile Company Boston.
E.J.Y.R	England	1907	See Rutherford.
Elberon	US	1903	Named in list of steam cars—details unknown.
Electronomic	US	1900–1901	The Electromagnetic Steamer was manufactured by the Simplex Motor Vehicle Company. The company was incorporated in 1900, but made its first car in 1899.
Elite	US	1900–1901	A model built by D B Smith and Company, Utica, New York.
Empire	US	1901	Built by Empire Manufacturing Company of Stirling, Illinois also known as the Stirling steam car.
Empire	US	1904–1905	A steam-driven car designed by William H Terwilliger of the Empire Auto Company of Amsterdam, New York. Several experimental models were made from 1898 but production only started in 1904.
English Mechanic	England	1900–1905	Do-it-yourself tricycle and steam car designed by Thomas Hyler White for The English Mechanic and World of Science magazine. He also designed petrol cars as the one shown to the photograph.
Essex	US	1905–1906	A 4 cylinder steam car made by the Essex Motor Car Company of Boston.
Fawcett-Fowler	England	1907–1909	
Federal	US	1901–1903	A steam car made by Federal Motor Vehicle Company of Brooklyn, New York.
Fidelia	France	1905–1906	A steam car produced by Voitures Fidelia of Angers, Maine-et-Loire, France.
Filtz	France	1901–1910	Mostly commercial vehicles.
Foster	US	1900–1903	The Foster Automobile Manufacturing Company of Rochester, New York produced 165 vehicles before bankruptcy in 1903. One of the investors in the company William H. Artzberger, an artist of Allegheny acquired the rights, and founded the Artzberger Automobile Company. Re-launching the cars as improved Foster's in 1903. The company ceased auto production in 1905.
Frazer	England	1911	Possibly only a prototype made.
Friedmann	US	1900–1903	A steam car made by the Friedmann Automobile Company of Chicago.
Gage	US	1903	Named in list of steam cars—details unknown.
Geneva	US	1901–1904	The Geneva Steamer was made in 1901 by the Geneva Automobile and Manufacturing Company of Geneva, Ohio. One is on display at the Henry Ford Museum, Dearborn, Michigan. Geneva also made the Turtle, a racing car. In 1904 the company was sold to the Colonial Brass Co.
Henrietta	US	1901	A steam car made by the Henrietta Motor Company of New York.
Hess	US		Named in list of steam cars—details unknown.
Hidley	US	1901	Between one and four were made by the Hidley Automobile Company of 257 Broadway, Troy, New York.
Hoffman	US	1902–1904	A light steam car made by the Hoffman Automobile and Manufacturing Company at Cleveland, Ohio. From 1904 the company switched to petrol powered vehicles, the Royal Tourist.
Holland	US		Named in list of steam cars—details unknown.
Hood	US	1900–1901	Steam car made by Ralph Hood of Danvers associated with the Simplex Motor car company.
Houghton	US	1900–1901	A steam car made by H R Houghton's Houghton Automobile Company of West Newton.
Howard	US	1900–1902	Steam cars built by the Howard Automobile Company of Trenton, New Jersey.
Howard	US	1901–1903	A chainless steam car built by William S Howard's Trojan Launch and Automobile Works of Troy, New York.
Hudson	US	1901–1902	A steam car designed by Howard Coffin and built by Bean-Chamberlain Manufacturing Company.
Hythe	England	1903	Named in list of steam cars—details unknown.
International	US	1903	In Toledo became the International Motor Car Company for a time before becoming Pope Motor Car Company.
Jaxon	US	1903–1904	Steam cars made by Jackson Automobile Company of Jackson, Michigan.
Johnson	US	1905–1907	Steam cars made by Professor Warren F Johnson's Johnson Service Company of Milwaukee until 1907 when the company switched to petrol powered vehicles. The company ceased business after Johnson died in 1912.
Keene	US	1900–1901	The Keen Steammobile was built by the Trinity Bicycle Company of Keene. In 1901 the company changed name to the Steammobile Company of America and the cars name also changed to Steammobile.
Keenelet	England	1904	Possibly only a prototype built by Keene's Automobile Works of London.
Kellogg	US	1903	Named in list of steam cars—details unknown.
Kent's Pacemaker	US	1900	An unusual steam car made by A.W. Kent's Colonial Company of Boston. It had a wheel for steering at the front and three rear wheels, one of which propelled the car while the other two could be lifted making it more like a motorbike.
Kidder	US	1900–1901	Three styles of Kidder's were made including a delivery wagon.
King	US	1904	One-off steam automobile built for Gilbert M King.
Knoller	Austria	1904-1910	Steam cars made by Max Friedmann of Vienna. Very few were made.
Kraft	US	1901	A steam car made in St. Louis, Missouri.
L'Autovapeur	France	1905–1906	A Parisian steam car make powered by a Gardner-Serpollet engine.
Lamplough-Albany	England	1903	See Albany-Lamplough.
Lane	US	1900	Steam cars made by Lane Motor Vehicle Company of Poughkeepsie, New York.
Liquid Air	US	1901–1902	Liquid Air Power and Automobile Company Boston.
Locke	US	1901	See Puritan.
Lozier	US	1901–1902	A Lozier Motor Company prototype steam car. The production cars, commencing in 1905, had petrol engines only.
Lyons	US		Named in list of steam cars—details unknown.
Maryland	US	1900–1901	A steam car made by the Maryland Automobile Manufacturing company of Luke, Maryland.
MCC	England	1902–1904	Motor Construction Company of Nottingham steam cars sold as Vapomobile.
McCurdy	US	1901	Named in list of steam cars—details unknown.
McKay	US	1900–1902	Renamed Stanley-Whitney. Steam buggy made by Frank Forrester Stanley's Stanley Manufacturing Company. Stanley's reverted to manufacturing shoes and in 1920 were taken over by the A.G. Walton Shoe Co.
Meteor	US	1902–1903	The Reading steam cars were built by the Meteor Engineering Company from 1902 after the company acquired the Steam Vehicle Company of America.
Miller	US	1903	Named in list of steam cars—details unknown.
Mills	US		Named in list of steam cars—details unknown.
Milwaukee	US	1900–1902	A steam stanhope made by the Milwaukee Automobile Company.
Moncrief	US	1901–1902	James A Moncrief of the Pawtucket Steamboat Company of Pawtucket, Rhode Island made a few steam cars.
Morriss	England	1906–1912	Only four cars were made at Sandringham. Only one survives.
Morse	US	1904–1909	Made by the Morse Motor Vehicle Company of Springfield. In 1909 the company became the Easton Machine Company, which made a petrol powered vehicle under the Morse name.
Neff	Canada	1901	A steam buggy built by Benton Neff of Port Colborne and displayed at the Port Colborne Historical and Marine Museum.
Neustadt-Perry	US	1901–1903	J.H. Neustadt and Perry was partnership. In 1904 Neustadt bought out Perry forming the Neustadt Automobile and Supply Company located in St Louis, Missouri. From 1904 it made petrol powered cars.
New Home	US	1901	See Grout.
Ophir	US	1901	Made by the Century Motor Vehicle Company of Syracuse, New York.
Ormond	US	1904–1905	Made by United Motor and Vehicle Co of Boston.
Overholt	US	1909	Named in list of steam cars—details unknown.
Oxford	US	1900–1904	Named in list of steam cars—details unknown.
Paridant	Belgium	1903–?	Named in list of steam cars—details unknown.
Parker-Wearwell	England	1901	Thomas Hugh Parker of Wearwell Motor Carriage Company, Wolverhampton made a steam car. Only one seems to have been made with Wearwell concentrating on petrol powered motor bikes.
Pawtucket	US	1901–1902	A single seat car made by the Pawtucket Steam Boat Company of Providence, Rhode Island.
Pearson & Cox	England	1908–1916	Pearson and Cox were petrol and steam powered car makers from Shortlands, Kent.
Phelps	US	1901	Named in list of steam cars—details unknown.
Pierce	US	1900	The first car made by George N Pierce and Co was steam powered but a failure. They switched to petrol cars.
Pope	US	1903–1904	The Pope Motor Car Company replaced the International Motor Car Company making Toledo's.
Porter	US	1900–1901	Steam cars made by Porter Motor Company of Boston.
Prescott	US	1901–1907	These steam cars were made by A L Prestcott's Prescott Automobile Manufacturing Company, 09 Chambers Street, New York. The company closed in 1907 after an employee stole most of its cash.
Puritan	US	1902–1903	Albert Locke's Lock Regulator Company of Salem, Massachusetts built a four-passenger steam runabout named the Puritan.
Ramapaugh	US	1902	Charles A Ball's Miami Cycle and Manufacturing Company decided to build automobiles in 1902. The name Ramapaugh came from an old Indian chief who lived near Ball in New York. Ball bought the first and only vehicle completed.
Randall	US	1902	A steam carriage made by G N Randall.
Randolph	US		Named in list of steam cars—details unknown.
Reading	US	1900–1902	A steam car made by Steam Vehicle Company of America, Reading. The company was sold to Meteor Engineering Co in 1902.
Reid	New Zealand	1903-1905	Made three steam cars which used engines imported from the United States.
Rexer	France	1905–1910	See Weyher et Richemond.
Richmond	US	1902–1903	A steam car made by the Richmond Automobile Company of Richmond, Indiana.
Riley & Cowley	US	1902	A steam car made in Brooklyn, New York.
Rochester	US	1900–1901	A steam buggy made by Rochester Carriage Motor Company of Rochester, New York.
Ross	US	1905–1909	A steam car made by Louis S Ross of Newtonville.
Rutherford (also known as E.J.Y.R.)	England	1907–1912	The car was designed by EJY Rutherford and George Hamilton of the Highclere Motor Car Syndicate Ltd, and was first known by Rutherford's initials as the E.J.Y.R.
Safety	US	1901	Safety Steam Automobile Company Boston.
Schirmer	Switzerland	1903–1904	Named in list of steam cars—details unknown.
Seely	US	1900s	A double engined steam car made by F.L. Seely. Only one is believed to have been built.
Shatswell	US	1901–1903	A kit steam car sold by H K Shatswell and Co Dedham MA.
Sheppee	England	1912	A steam automobile made in York by Colonel F H Sheppee's Sheppee Motor Company. Only two cars were made, most production was flash steam powered commercial vehicles. The company still exists but no longer makes vehicles.
Siemens-Halske	Germany	1900–1905	Named in list of steam cars—details unknown.
Simons	US	1903	Named in list of steam cars—details unknown.
Simpson	India	1903	Samual John Green of Simpson & Co, Madras produced the first Indian steam car in 1903. They made very few as the company specialised in coachmade bodies for imported motor car chassis.
Skene	US	1900–1901	Steam cars made by Skene American Automobile Company of Springfield.
SM	England	1904–1905	A steam car that may never have got beyond prototype.
Springer	US	1904–1906	A steam car made by John H Springer's Springer Motor Vehicle Company of New York.
Springfield	US	1900–1904	The Springfield Motor Car Company made a steam-powered van in 1901, but no details of a steam-powered car found.
Stammobile	US	1902–1905	A steam buggy made by the Stammobile Manufacturing Company of Stamford, Connecticut.
Standard	US	1902–1905	Named in list of steam cars—details unknown.
Stanton	US	1901	Stanton Manufacturing Co acquired the New England steam car business in 1901. They continued to make the cars with some improvements but ceased business the same year.
Steamobile	US	1901–1902	The renamed Keene. In 1902 the factory closed because of over-production.
Stearns	US	1900–1904	E.C. Stearns of Syracuse, New York owned a huge automobile parts supply store and as owner of the Stearns Automobile Co made Stearns Steam Carriages. He made the automobile company a subsidiary of E J Pennington's Anglo-American Rapid Transit Co which drained money from Stearns company making it went bankrupt.
Sterling	US	1901–1902	See Empire.
Stesroc	England	1905–1906	A steam car made by Johnson Brothers of Knaresborough, Yorkshire.
Stolz	Hungary	1911–1915	Named in list of steam cars—details unknown.
Storck	US	1901–1903	Steam cars made by Frank C Storck of Red Bank, New Jersey.
Stringer	US	1901	Prototype only made by Stringer Automobile Company of Marion, Ohio.
Strouse	US	1915	Named in list of steam cars—details unknown.
Sunset	US	1901–1904	A steam car made by Dorville Libby Junior's Sunset Automobile Company of San Francisco until they switched to petrol engines.
Taunton	US	1901–1904	A steam runabout built by Everitt Cameron. Cameron went on to build petrol powered cars under his name.
Thompson	US	1900–1902	Named in list of steam cars—details unknown. There was a Thompson Automobile Company of Providence Rhode Island that made a six-passenger steam car in 1906
Toledo	US	1901–1903	A steam car first made in September 1900 by the American Bicycle Company of Toledo, later by the International Motor Car Company and then by Pope in 1903. Production ceased in 1903 and Pope contracted the Manhattan Supply Company to dispose of the remaining cars. The last were sold in 1904 at below cost.
Tractobile	US	1900–1902	The Tractobile was built by E.J. Pennington's company of Carlisle between 1900–1902. While a car with that name could be ordered it was more an engine and wheels on a removable frame that could be attached to a carriage instead of horses. Very few were built.
Trinity	US	1900	Possibly a name for Keene's as they were made by the Trinity Cycle Manufacturing Company.
Triumph	US	1900	Named in list of steam cars—details unknown.
Turner-Miesse	England	1902–1907	Miesse's from Belgium built under licence in England. The licence with Miesse was terminated in 1906 or 1907 and after that Turner made their own design of steam car until 1913.
Twombly	US	1904, 1910	The first of Williard Twombly's three attempts to make a car. The steamer was too expensive to produce so he turned to petrol. This also proved to be too expensive. His 1910 version had a quick replacement engine and a body that could be changed. Unfortunately Twombly could not raise funds to manufacture the car. He tried again in 1914 with a petrol powered cyclecar, but this suffered the same fate.
Vapomobile	England	1902–1904	See MCC.
Xander	US	1901–1902	The Xander automobile company was founded in 1901 by John G. Xander in Reading, Pennsylvania. His first cars were steam, then gasoline engines were used. He only built his car custom order. In 1902, he stopped.
Warfield	England	1903	Possibly only a prototype.
Watch	US	1903	A steam car made by Watch City Automobile Company of Waltham, Massachusetts.
Watt	US	1901	Named in list of steam cars—details unknown.
Webb-Jay	US	1908	Racing specials largely of White Motor Company origin.
Weidknecht	France	1911	Weidknecht built a steam bus in 1911.
Westfield	US	1902–1903	Steam cars made by C J Moore Manufacturing Company of Westfield.
Weyher et Richemond	France	1905–1910	Steam cars made by Automobiles Weyher et Richmond of Pantin, Seine. Probably no private cars built after 1907. Also known as Rexer.
White	US	1900–1911	The White Motor Company was an American automobile and truck manufacturer from 1900 until 1980. The company also produced bicycles, roller skates, automatic lathes, and sewing machines. Before World War II, the company was based in Cleveland, Ohio. From 1900 to 1911 White produced steam-powered cars before switching to gasoline.
Wood	US	1902–1903	A steam car made by the Wood Vapor Vehicle Company of Brooklyn, New York.
Wood-Loco	US	1901–1902	A steam car made by Wood-Loco Vehicle Company of Cohoes, New York.

== 1914 to 1939 – Decline ==
The steam cars of this era up until the 1930s were the last steam-powered production cars. The power advantages that steam had possessed were overtaken by the improvements to the petrol powered internal combustion engines.

Make	Country	Years active	Comments
Alena Steam Car	US	1922	The Alena Steam Products Company of Indianapolis, Indiana began making steam trucks in 1920. The Alena Steam Car was an American car planned for manufacture in 1922. Only two cars were built both touring models, each had a wheelbase of 126 inches (3,200 mm). The company went into receivership and closed in 1923.
American	US	1924–1948	The American Steam Cars were production cars of various makes retrofitted with steam engines of the American Steam Automobile Co, West Newton, Massachusetts, from 1924 to 1948. It was built by Thomas S. Derr, a former faculty member at the Massachusetts Institute of Technology. Among the cars made was the Leslie steam car of the late 1930s to early 1940s.
American Steamer	US	1922–1924	Steam cars manufactured by the American Steam Truck Co. of Elgin, Illinois.
Baker	US	1917–1924	Steam cars made by Dr Hartley O Baker's Baker Steam Motor Car and Manufacturing Company of Pueblo and Denver, Colorado.
Barlow	US	1922	Steam cars made by L P Barlow's Barlow Steam Car Company - also known as Barlow Steam Engineering Company, the Barlow-Detroit, and the Barlow Steam Engineering Syndicate.
Brooks	Canada	1923–1926	A Detroit steam car made by Brooks Steam Motors Limited.
Bryan	US	1918–1923	Steam cars made by Bryan Steam Motors of Peru, Indiana. Only six were built.
Clermont	US	1922	A short lived steam car company.
Coats	US	1922–1923	Steam cars made by Coats Steam Car Company of Chicago, later models called Stewart-Coats.
Crossland	US	1922–1923	Designed by Harry Crossland Pfaff, the 2 cylinder Crossland of the Crossland Steam Motive Corporation debuted at the January 1923 Chicago Automobile Show. It was financed Edwin Galt Brookfield. Four are thought to have been built with only one, a 1923 Crossland Phaeton, known to have survived.
Davis Steam Motors	US	1921	The Davis Steam Motors Inc of Detroit may have built a steam car. The company was formed in March 1921 by Merrill Davis, E M Bliss, A B Eggert and F D Sieberg.
Delling	US	1923–1927	A steam car developed by Eric H. Delling of the Delling Steam Motor Company West Collingwood, New Jersey and Philadelphia, Pennsylvania.
Derr	US	1926–1931 (possibly as late as 1935)	See American.
Detroit	US	1922	The Detroit Steam Motors Corporation of Detroit made steam cars called Trask-Detroits in 1922. The company became Brooks Steam Motors maker of the Brook steam car.
Endurance	US	1924–1925	A steam car built by the Endurance Steam Car Company of Los Angeles, California and later Dayton, Ohio.
Gearless	US	1921–1923	Made by Peterson-Culp Gearless Steam Automobile Company, Denver, Colorado.
HLB	England	1914	Possibly only a prototype made by HLB Motors of Islington Green, London.
Lutz	US	1917	Proposed car by Lutz Motor Co Buffalo New York.
MacDonald	US	1923–1924	Steam cars made by MacDonald Steam Automotive Group of Garfield, Ohio.
Marion-Handley	US	1916–1919	Mutual Motors Company, Jackson MI.
Mercury	US	1923	Steam car made by the Mercury Steam Car Corporation of San Francisco.
Remal-Vincent	US	1923	A steam car made by the Steam Car Corporation of California based in San Francisco.
Scott-Newcomb	US	1921–1922	See Standard.
Standard	US	1920–1921	Manufactured by the Standard Engineering Company of St Louis, Missouri from 1920 until 1921. Also known as the Scott-Newcomb.
Stewart-Coats	US	1923	See Coats.
Super-Steamer	US	1918–1919	See Gearless.
Trask-Detroit	US	1922–1923	See Detroit.
Windsor	US	1922–1923	See Detroit.

== 1940 to date – Renewed interest ==
Makes in this era are generally prototypes or experimental.

Make	Country	Years active	Comments
Aerojet	US	1972	Aerojet Liquid Rocket Company of Sacramento were contracted by the Californian Assembly to develop a steam-powered car. Aerojet retrofitted a steam turbine into a Chevrolet Vega.
Arbel Symétric	France	1958	First French nuclear concept car was to be possibly powered by a steam engine driven by steam from a nuclear reactor.
Autocoast Vaporizer	US	1969	A retrofitted Indy Car by Ernest Kanzler which was to attempt to set a new steam car speed record driven by Skip Hedrick at Bonneville on 19 October 1969.
Besler	US	1956-57	1953 Kaiser Manhattan Project for Henry Kaiser to install a steam engine in a Kaiser Manhattan.
Crank	US	1977	See Steamin' Demon.
Detrick	US	1957	Forrest R Detrick's S-101 prototype.
Dutcher	US	1972	Steam Power Systems of San Diego were contracted by the Californian Assembly to develop a steam-powered car. They build the Dutcher, a car named after the company's founder, Cornelius Dutcher. It is on display at the Petersen Automotive Museum in Los Angeles.
Enginion	Germany	1996	An R&D subsidiary of the Volkswagen group developing a system called ZEE (Zero Emissions Engine). It produced steam almost instantly without an open flame.
Ford FX Atmos	US	1954	A concept car which was envisaged possibly having a steam engine using steam from a nuclear reactor.
Ford Mystere	US	1955	Was to be world's first nuclear powered concept car. Never went past model stage. Was to use a steam engine powered by steam from a nuclear reactor.
Ford Nucleon	US	1958	Was to be world's second nuclear powered concept car. Never went past model stage. Was to use a steam engine powered by steam from a nuclear reactor.
Ford Seattle-ite XXI	US	1962	Concept car demonstrated at 1962 Worlds Fair in Seattle never went past concept stage. Was to use nuclear powered steam engine as auxiliary source of power.
General Motors	US	1969	Two experimental steam-powered cars. The SE 124 based on a converted Chevrolet Chevelle and the SE 101 based on the Pontiac Grand Prix.
Healey	England	1970	Donald Healey decided to make a basic steam car technology more in line with Stanley or Doble and aimed at enthusiasts.
Inspiration	England	2009	The British Steam Car Challenge broke the record for a steam vehicle, setting a new speed record of 238.679 km/h (148.308 mph).
Keen	US	1940–1973	Completed two experimental cars and was constructing a third at the time of his death.
Kinetics	US	1970	A variant of the steam engine made by Wallace L. Minto of Kinetics Corporation, using Ucon U-113 fluorocarbon as the working fluid instead of gasoline, kerosene and steam or the like as a fuel. The first vehicle was a Volkswagen Microbus fitted with a Stanley Steamer engine using U-113 instead of water. The second was a Datsun Bluebird 510 stationwagon. He followed that in 1973 with a Freon powered Nissan 520 light truck.
Lear	US	1969	A retrofited Chevrolet Monte Carlo and an Indy Car prototype.
Likamobile	US	2005–?	A steam-powered replica of the Locomobile Style 2 (1900–1901) that is made in kit-form by Modelworks.
Loco Hauk	US	2016	Heavily modified steam powered jeep.
Mildred	UK	2017	Steam powered Land Rover
Paxton	US	1953–1954	A prototype called the Phoenix was created by the Paxton Engineering Division of McCulloch Motors Corporation, Los Angeles, incorporating Abner Doble's Doble Ultimax engine. The project was eventually dropped in 1954.
Peterson			Stanley steam-powered.
Pellandine	Australia	1970s-2012	Peter Pellandine conducted experiments with a steam car for the South Australian government. He made an attempt on the steam speed record in 1976 and continued his interest in developing steam-powered cars until his death in 2012.
Pritchard	Australia	1972	Edward Pritchard created a steam-powered 1963 model Ford Falcon in 1972.
Ranotor	Sweden	2000s	After leaving Saab, Dr Ove Platell started a company Ranotor with his son Peter Platell to develop a steam hybrid that uses the exhaust heat from an ordinary petrol engine to power a small steam engine to reduce fuel consumption.
Saab	Sweden	1974	A project codenamed ULF headed by Dr Ove Platell made a prototype steam-powered car. After Saab dropped the project Platell started his own project. See Ranotor.
Simca Fulgur	France	1958	Second French nuclear concept car was to be possibly powered by a steam engine driven by steam from a nuclear reactor.
Steam Speed America	US	2014	A speed record attempt car by Chuk Williams of Team Speed America. It crashed on its first run after reaching 147 mph.
Steamin' Demon	US	1985	Barber-Nichols Engineering of Denver used a steam turbine they had designed for Lear and the Los Angeles city bus program to attempt to gain the steam-powered land speed record. It reached 145.607 but only completed one pass due to a fire. The cars body was a Fiberfab Aztec 7 and had originally been completed by James Crank for his 1977 steam record attempt.
Studebaker-Packard Astral	US	1957	Was Studebaker-Packard's answer to the Ford Nuclear Concept Cars. This too possibly could have used a steam engine powered by steam from a reactor.
Williams	US	1957–1968	Calvin C William's Williams Engine Company Incorporated of Ambler began advertising steam car retrofits or complete cars in 1957. At least one original car was built, using a Victress S4 body. They were offering a steam converted Chevrolet Chevelle for $10,250. Nine were ordered along with a Ford Fairlane from the Ford Motor Company. Cost of components delayed the project causing the Williams to close in 1968.

== See also ==
- Clayton Wagons Ltd.
- List of traction engine manufacturers
- History of steam road vehicles
- History of the automobile
- Steam car
- Steam bus
- Steam wagon
