= Empire Steamer =

Steam-driven car

The Empire Steamer was a steam-driven car designed by William H. Terwilliger of the Empire Auto Company of Amsterdam, New York. Several experimental models were made from 1898 but production only started in 1904. The car had a two-cylinder engine with boiler mounted centrally. the cars were advertised at $2000.

== See also ==
- Steam car
- Empire (1901 automobile)
- Empire (1910 automobile)
- Empire Steam Car
