= Empire Steam Car =

United States steam car manufactured between about 1925 and 1927

The Empire Steam Car was a United States steam car manufactured between about 1925 and 1927. Built with a three-cylinder compound engine, it was designed by Carl Uebelmesser and built in New York City by the Cruban Machine & Steel Corporation. Only one car was built, and it was not entirely finished.

== See also ==
- Empire (1901 automobile)
- Empire (1910 automobile)
