= Keystone (steam automobile) =

Defunct American motor vehicle manufacturer

The Keystone Steamer was an American automobile manufactured from 1899 until 1900 in Lebanon, Pennsylvania.

== History ==
Keystone Match & Machine Company was founded in 1894 and offering bicycles from 1896. In 1899 the company offered an interesting but complicated steam car. It featured runabout coachwork and was powered by three small single-cylinder steam engines built into each of its rear wheel hubs in a way that they worked as a radial engine. It was tried to avoid the use of sprockets, chains and a differential gear as each wheel worked completely independent from the other. The vehicle could reach a maximum speed of 20 miles per hour (32 km/h).

Planned production included trucks, but the Keystone Match & Machine Co. gave up all automobile projects in 1900, concentrating instead in producing matches and machinery for that purpose.

Engineer J. G. Xander, who mainly developed the Keystone Steamer, went to Reading, Pennsylvania, where he manufactured steam and gasoline engines, and offered for a short time the Xander automobile, built on custom order.
