= Hidley Steam Car =

American steam car

The Hidley Steam Car was an American steam car manufactured only in 1901. It was built by the Hidley Automobile Company, which was founded by J. H. Hidley. One steam car was certainly built, and as many as four may have been produced at the factory in Troy, New York.

== See also ==
List of steam car makers
