= American Waltham =

Defunct American motor vehicle manufacturer

The American Waltham was produced from 1898 to 1899 by the American Waltham Manufacturing Co., a bicycle firm based in Waltham, Massachusetts. It was a typical light steam buggy, with a 2-cylinder engine under the seat, tiller steering and cycle-type wheels. It is not to be confused with the more famous Waltham or Waltham Orient steamer, which was made by another bicycle maker at the same time. The company built only a handful of cars before returning full-time to the production of bicycles.
