= American Steamer =

Defunct American motor vehicle manufacturer

The American Steamer was an American steam car manufactured by the American Steam Truck Co. of Elgin, Illinois, from 1922 to 1924.

The American Steamer was typical of the steam cars which flooded the market in the early 1920s. It featured a twin-cylinder compound double-acting motor deemed capable of at least 60 miles per hour (97 km/h). The company offered a touring car, a roadster, a coupe, and a sedan. Between 16 and 20 were built. The prototype was tested as early as 1918, but the company went bankrupt shortly thereafter.

== See also ==
- American Steam Car
- AMC (automobile)
- Coats Steam Car
