= Prescott Automobile Manufacturing Company =

Defunct American motor vehicle manufacturer

- Founded: 1901; 125 years ago
- Founder: A. L. Prescott
- Defunct: 1905; 121 years ago
- Headquarters: New York City, United States
- Products: Automobiles
- Production output: unknown (1901-1905)

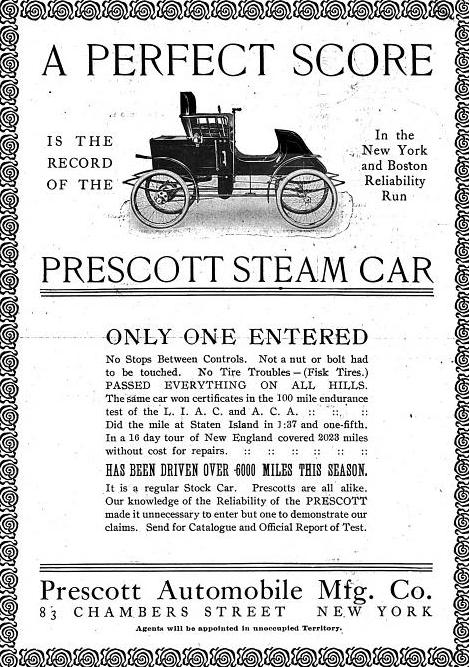
1902 Prescott

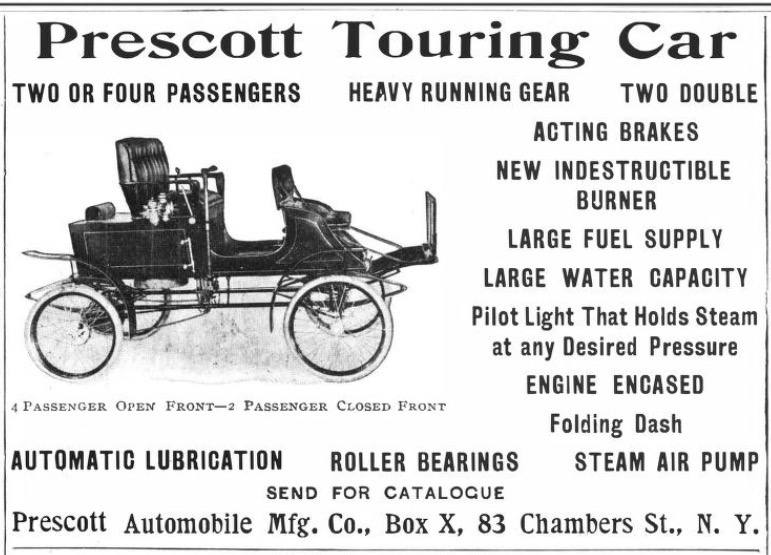
Prescott advertisement (1902)

The Prescott Automobile Manufacturing Company was an automobile manufacturer in Passaic, New Jersey, from 1901 to 1905.

== History ==
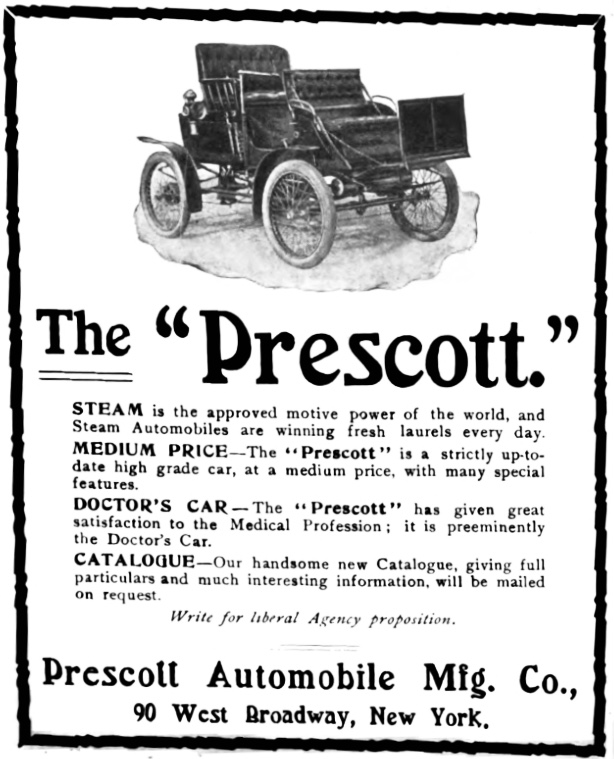
Prescott (1904)

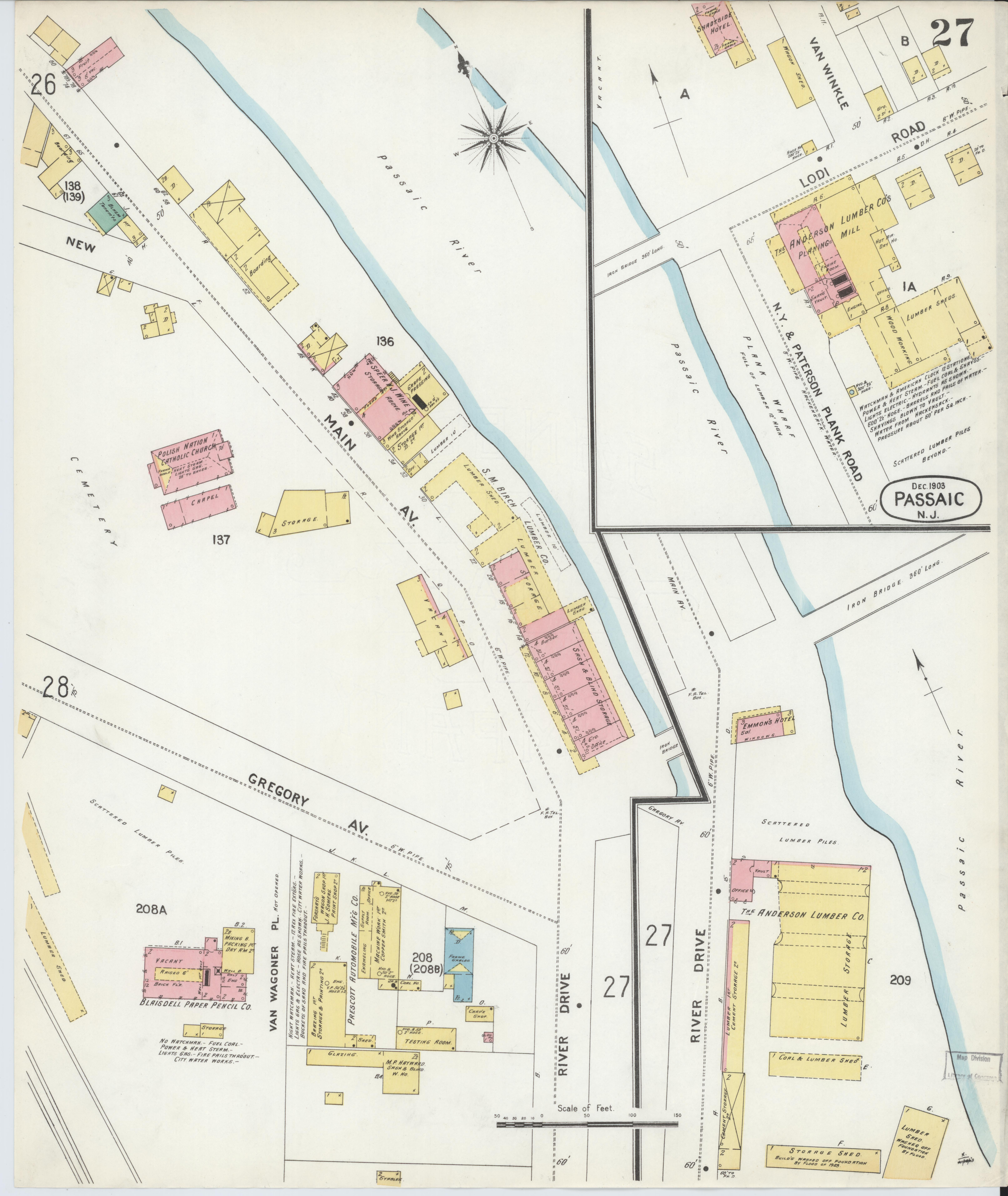
Prescott Automobile Manufacturing Company plant

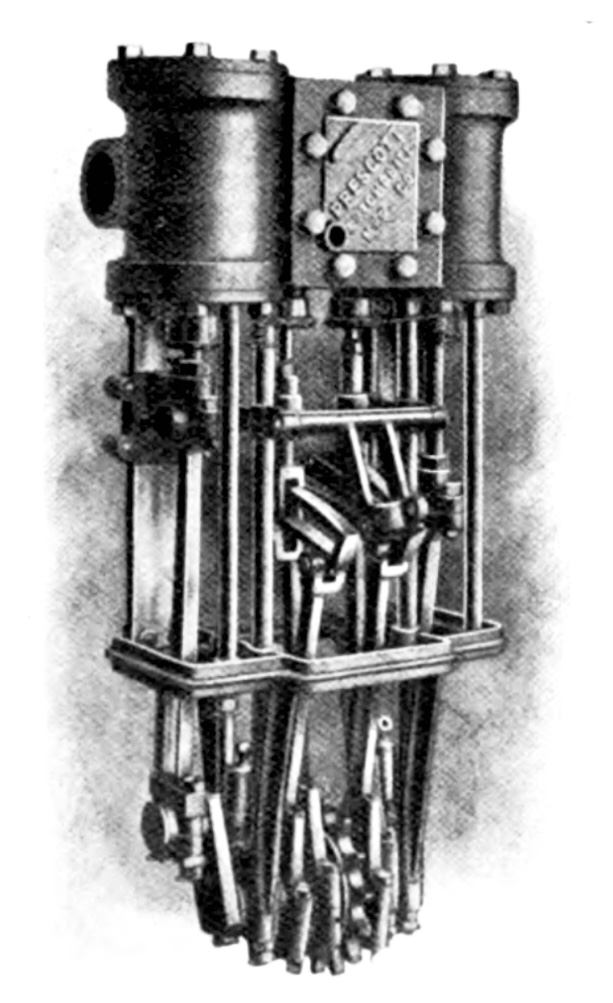
Prescott Two Cylinder Steam Engine (1904)

The company was founded in 1901 by Amos. L. Prescott, who would serve as president, and Frank F. Weston would serve as secretary. The headquarters was located at 83 Chambers St, New York City, and the factory in Passaic, New Jersey. In the same year, production of steam automobiles began.

In 1902 the company would be incorporated at $200,000.

The brand name of the vehicles was Prescott. Production ended in 1905.

== Prescott Steam Carriage ==
The first car offered by the firm was simply known as the "Prescott Steam Carriage" or the "Prescott Combination Carriage", and the body styles were described as "touring cars" – although this style differed significantly from later cars that would be known by the same name. The Steam Carriage weighed 1050 pounds, and had a wheelbase of 66 inches and wire wheels. The boiler was a 16-inch fire tube dry plate type. It had a 2 7/8 inch bore and a 4 inch stroke and the steam pressure was rated at 200 pounds. Horsepower for the car was 4 1/2. It had a 10 gallon gas tank and a 35 gallon water tank. The advertised range of the car was 100 miles for gas and 40 for water. The car was capable of seating either two or four people. The front of the car would unfold exposing a seat in front of the driver for two people and could fold back up when not in use. The listed price for late 1901 was $1000

In 1903 the Steam Carriage was updated. Horsepower was increased to 7 1/2 and the price was increased to $1100. The updated car rode on a 68 inch wheelbase and had a 32 gallon water tank and a 12 gallon gasoline tank.

For 1905 prices would reduce from $1100 down to $800 (the lowest price offered to date) and another unnamed car was expected to be introduced for $650.

=== Road Trip ===
In 1902 A. L. Prescott would drive his car on one of the earliest long distance trips. It was reported that over the course of 16 days he drove his car over 2000 miles and 196 on his last day of the trip. The car reportedly ran well and did not cost anything for repairs. After the trip was car was kept in regular use and ran over 50 miles a day.

== See also ==
- List of defunct United States automobile manufacturers
- Veteran vehicles
