= Slaymaker lock company =

Manufacturer of locks founded in 1888

Slaymaker Lock Company was a manufacturer of locks founded in 1888, which for a time made steam-powered automobiles. The company invented many unique inexpensive locks and were famous for their warded padlocks.

== The early years ==
The lock company, Slaymaker, Barry and Company, was founded in 1888 by Samuel R. Slaymaker and John F. Barry of Connellsville, Pennsylvania. Samuel Slaymaker had become interested in switch and signal locks while working for the Pennsylvania Railroad as a civil engineer. In 1894 the company was reorganized and renamed the Slaymaker–Barry Company with Samuel Slaymaker as the principal stock holder, and John Barry and William F. Troast as junior partners. The company's first locks filled the demand by the United States Government and various railroad companies for inexpensive locks.

On May 21, 1898, Slaymaker's original manufacturing plant in Connellsville was destroyed by fire. Fortunately the buildings were insured and a new factory was constructed the same year.

In 1899 the company began making steam powered automobiles. S.R. Slaymaker sold his share of the company in 1900 when it was renamed from the Slaymaker-Barry Company to Baldwin Automobile Manufacturing Company. S.R. Slaymaker retained the lock manufacturing business which he moved to North Water Street in Lancaster, Pennsylvania. His company traded under his name as S. R. Slaymaker.

== Baldwin Automobile Manufacturing Company ==
George J Humbert became President of the Baldwin in October 1900. Baldwin Automobile fell into financial difficulties by 1901 and were in receivership but were able to continue trading. It was advertising its steam cars as the Locomotor steam carriage.

In 1903 Baldwin announced it was constructing a new manufacturing plant in Morgantown, West Virginia. Baldwin's had ceased trading by about 1905.

== Slaymaker Locks ==
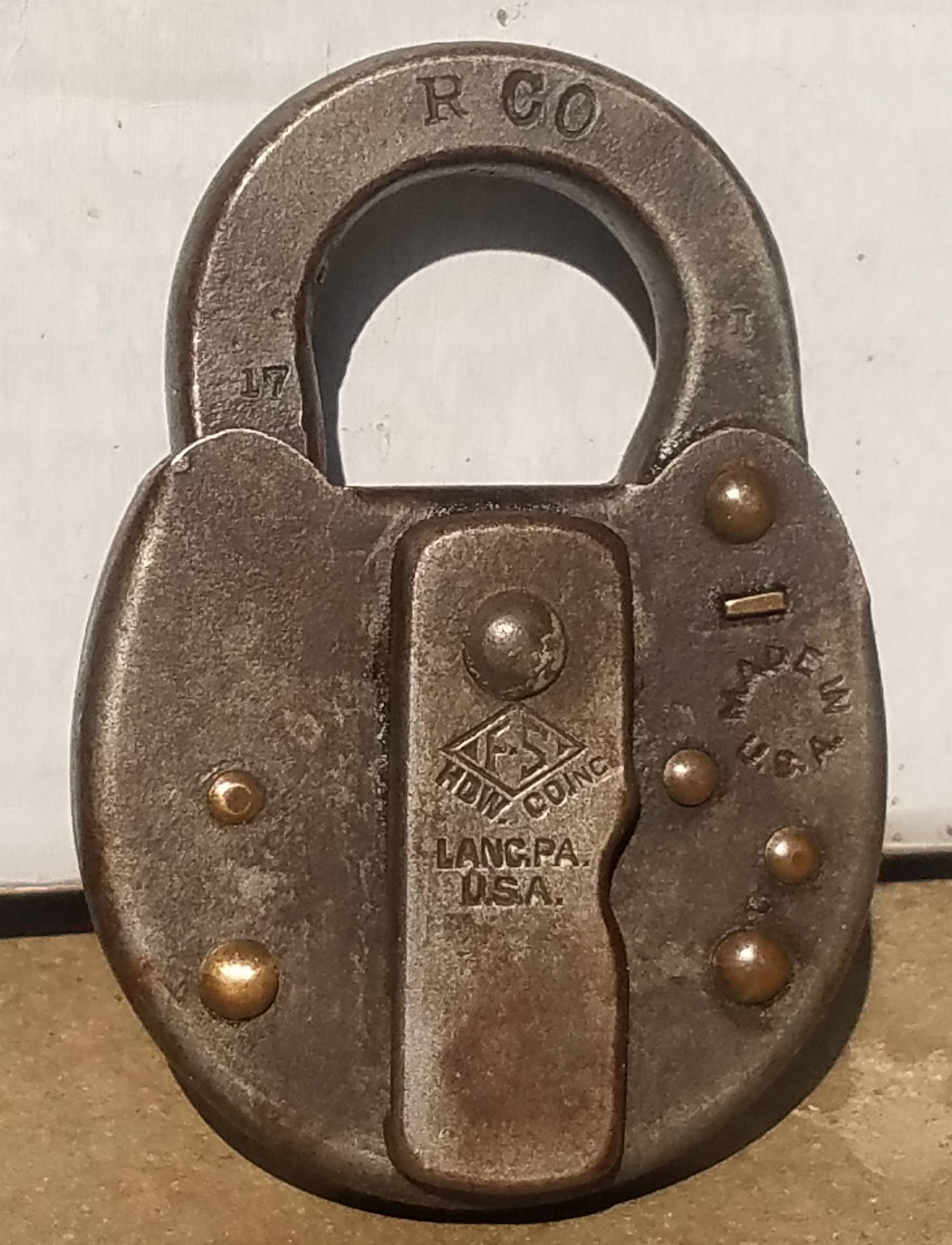
Fraim-Slaymaker Hardware padlock, made for the Reading Railroad.

In 1904 Slaymaker bought the T. Slaight lock company. In 1907 the S.R. Slaymaker Co. was reorganized and renamed the Slaymaker Lock Manufacturing Co. They purchased Dayton Manufacturing, an Ohio lock making company, in 1917. Also in 1917 the company was once again renamed when W. E. Fraim bought into the company and the company's new name became the Slaymaker Lock Company. W.E. Fraim's father, E.T. Fraim, owned the rival E.T. Fraim lock company and had died that year (1917) and W.E. Fraim had had a falling out with his family after his father's death.

In 1921 W.E. Fraim bought the controlling interest in the company and once again the name changed to the Fraim-Slaymaker Hardware Co. (marked as FS HDW CO INC, LANC. PA. on the locks). He then took away from the E.T. Fraim lock company the business they had with the Pennsylvania Railroad. At the time the Pennsylvania Railroad was the largest railroad in the country and the Fraim-Slaymaker Hardware Co. getting their business was a real coup. In 1930 S.R. Slaymaker bought back control of the company and changed the name back to the Slaymaker Lock Co. Eventually his son Samuel C. Slaymaker took over running the company.

In 1973 the Slaymaker Lock Company was sold to the American Home Products Corporation and made part of Ekco Housewares Division. In the 1980s the lock company suffered because the market had been flooded with cheap padlocks and the Slaymaker Lock Company was losing money. By 1986 the company officially decided to cash out and the company closed its doors at the manufacturing plant.
