= Kensington (steam automobile company) =

Defunct American motor vehicle manufacturer

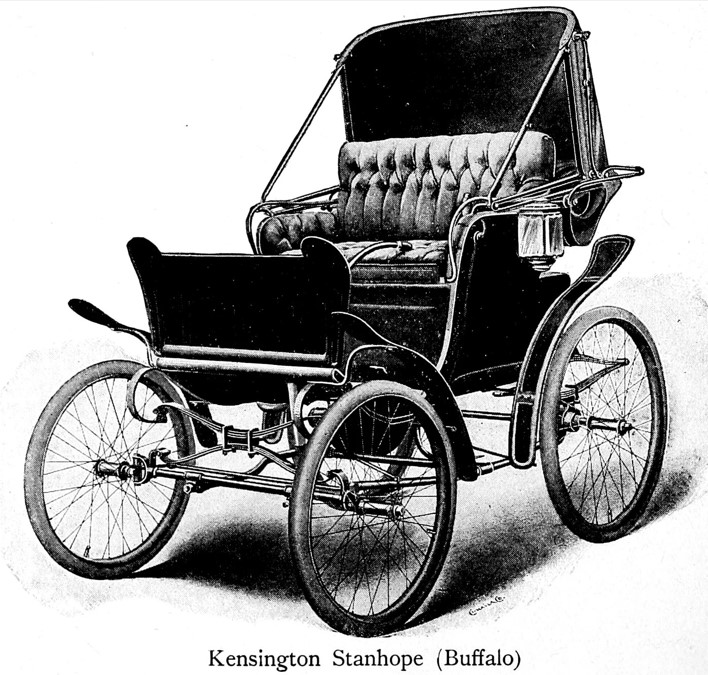
1900 Electric Kensington Stanhope

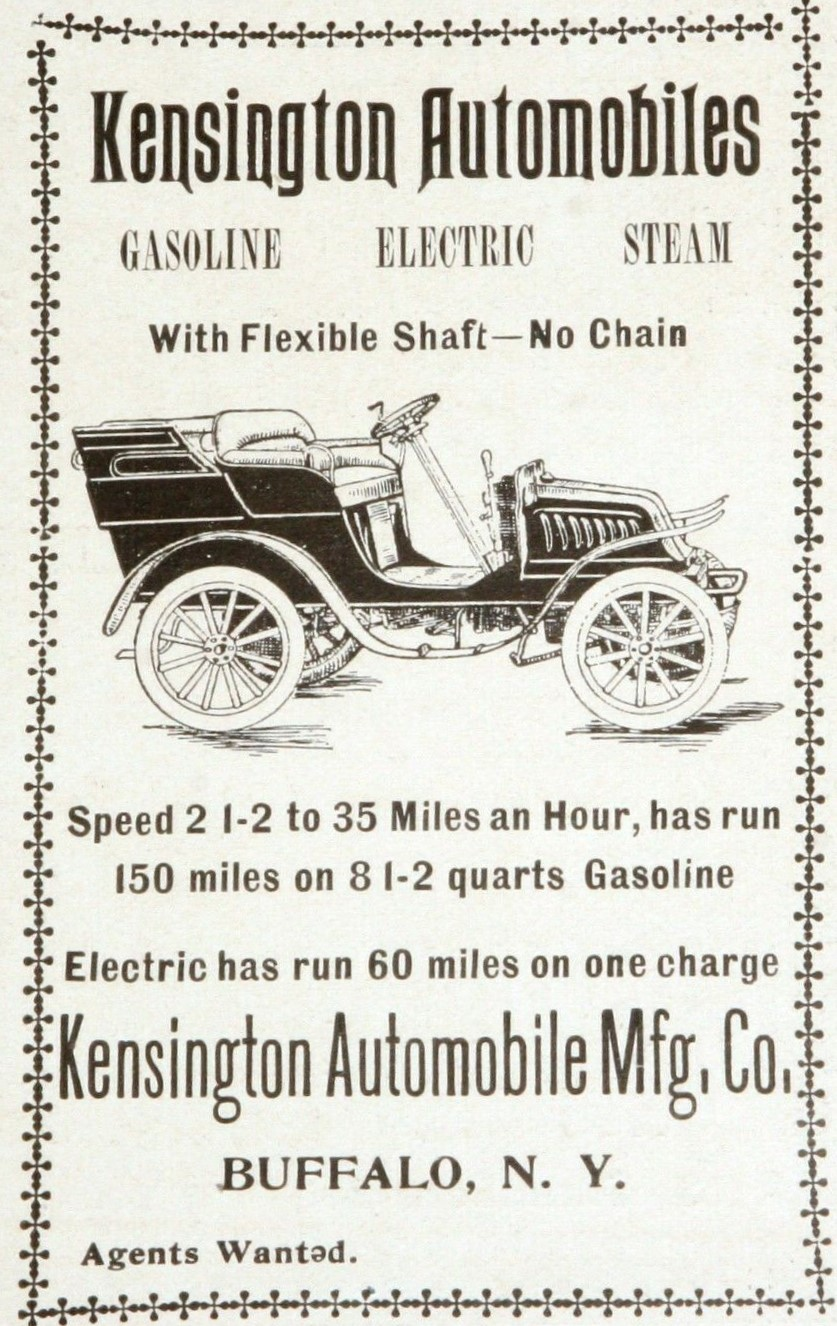
1902 Kensington Advertisement, Gasoline, Electric and Steam

The Kensington Automobile Company was a veteran-era automobile company that operated from 1899 to 1904 in Buffalo, New York.

== History ==
In August 1899, the Kensington Bicycle Company ceased bicycle production to venture into automobile manufacturing. They introduced a small electric car in 1900, which was later accompanied by a steam runabout in 1901. In 1902, a two-cylinder gasoline automobile was introduced and continued to be produced until 1904. The company faced failure in 1904.
