= American Steam Car =

Defunct American motor vehicle manufacturer

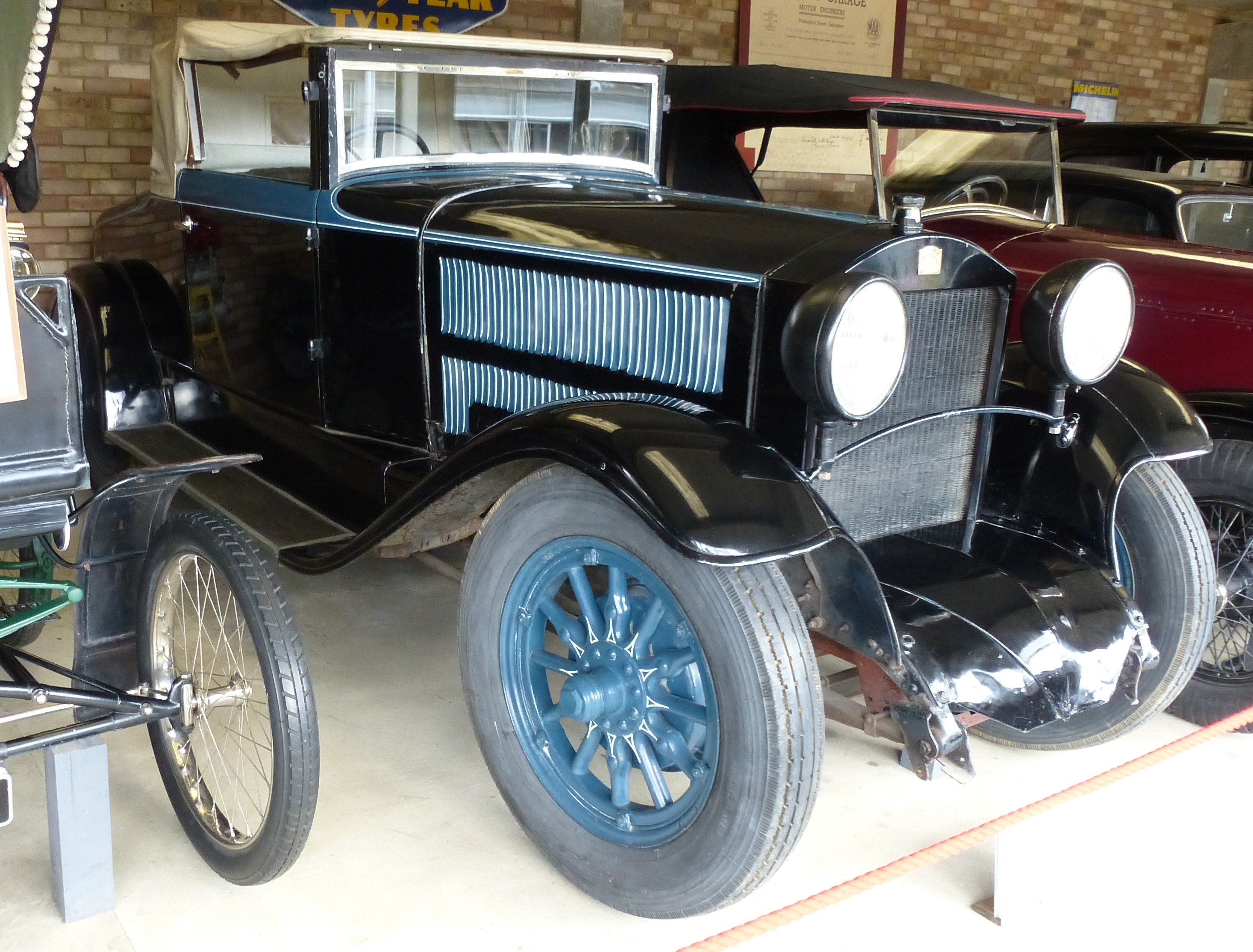

The American Steam Car was a product of the American Steam Automobile Co, West Newton, Massachusetts, from 1924 to 1948. It was built by Thomas S. Derr, a former faculty member at the Massachusetts Institute of Technology.

Derr specialized in servicing, modifications and improvements of Stanley steam cars. He went on to develop his own engine and boiler and offered for sale a number of cars as models of the American Steam Car, catering largely to former Stanley Steamer owners. The cars were largely conversions, the chassis, bodies, and basic components were from Hudson cars, but the hubcaps and condenser emblem bore the American name. Thomas Derr died in 1948.

== See also ==
- American Steamer
