= Eclipse (steam car) =

Steam car

Eclipse Automobile Company
- Industry: Automotive
- Founded: 1900
- Founder: Everett Cameron
- Defunct: 1903
- Fate: Dissolved
- Headquarters: Boston, Massachusetts

The Eclipse was a small steam runabout designed by Everett Cameron and manufactured in Easton, Massachusetts. The main offices were at 1005 Tremont Building in Boston.

== History ==
After years of tinkering with steam cars, Everette Cameron marketed his first automobile under the brand Eclipse. The company was incorporated on April 4, 1900, with a capital stock of $50,000.

In January 1901, three Eclipse cars were part of an automobile show at Mechanic's Hall in Boston. Seven orders were apparently taken during the show. One of the orders was made by Postmaster Hibbard in Boston who would order three; he believed that the Eclipse would cut mail delivery times by up to twenty minutes. Two cars were to be put into service in the Back Bay Station and the third at the Boulevard office. It was planned to have these cars in service in March, initially only collecting mail. At some point in 1901 Everett left Eclipse to build the Taunton car in Taunton, Massachusetts, later in 1903 he formed a company by his own name; the Cameron.

Unfortunately for the company, the mail order did not go through, and the lack of capitalization and general move away from steam cars severely harmed the company, and it would close its doors in 1903.

=== Eclipse Runabout ===
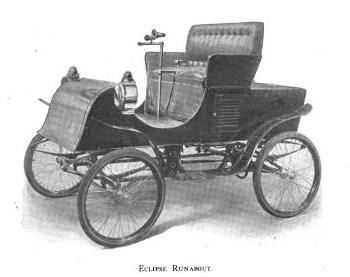
Eclipse Steam Runabout

The Eclipse Runabout (possibly also referred to as the Model E) was manufactured in Boston, Massachusetts. The car used a kerosene burner as opposed to the more common gasoline burner. The burner was made by the Barber Manufacturing Company of Boston. It was reported that the car could go from cold to running condition in about 10 minutes. To start the car, the driver had to warm the pilot light by burning alcohol until the pilot light was warm enough to then light the main burner.

The carriage was relatively average in appearance, the front wheels were slightly smaller than the rear wheels, 28 compared to 30 inches. The wheelbase was 62 inches. The car weighed 1,150 pounds empty and 1,300 pounds "with supplies". The body was made of wood. The gas tank was 14 gallons and water tank was 35 gallons. The front of the car had a trunk that could be opened and tools stored in it. Price was around $1000.

Controls were furnished by a tiller which was in the center of the car which allowed the car to be driven left handed or right handed (although other controls were not located in such a way). Also located in the middle near the seat was the throttle and bypass controls. There were three pedals, a reverse pedal, a brake, and an oil pump.
