= Lane (automobile) =

Defunct Steam Car Manufacturer

Lane Motor Vehicle Company
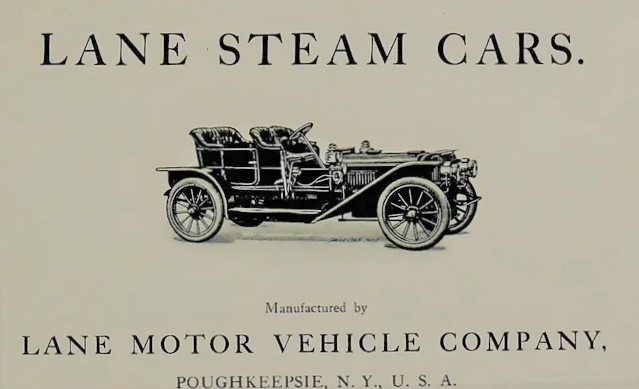

Overview
- Type: Steam car
- Production: 1900–1911
- Designer: The Lane Brothers

Powertrain
- Propulsion: Steam Engine

The Lane Steam Car was produced in Poughkeepsie, New York, from 1900 to 1911.

== History ==
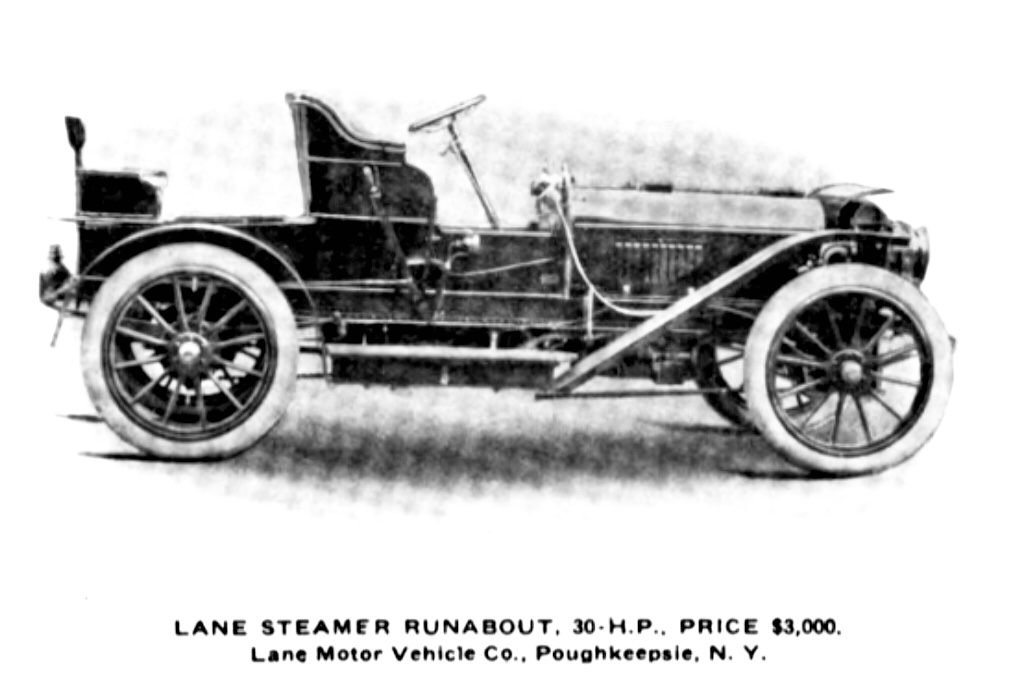
Lane Steamer Runabout (1908)

The Lane brothers; William, George and John built their first steam runabout for personal use in 1900. By the end of that year, they built five more and became a long term veteran and brass era producer of steam cars.

Incorporated as the Lane Motor Vehicle Company, the 1900 Model No. 1, was a 4 passenger runabout with a 2-cylinder steam engine under the body. In 1905 a touring body with the boiler under a front hood would be offered. The Model 75 Touring of 1907 was a 30hp compound engine steam car priced at $2,500 to $3,400, equivalent to $117,482 in 2025. Production in 1908 was 89 cars and was almost 150 in 1909.

Steam powered cars sales were slowing in favor of gasoline powered cars. Lane produced a final 63 steam cars in 1911.

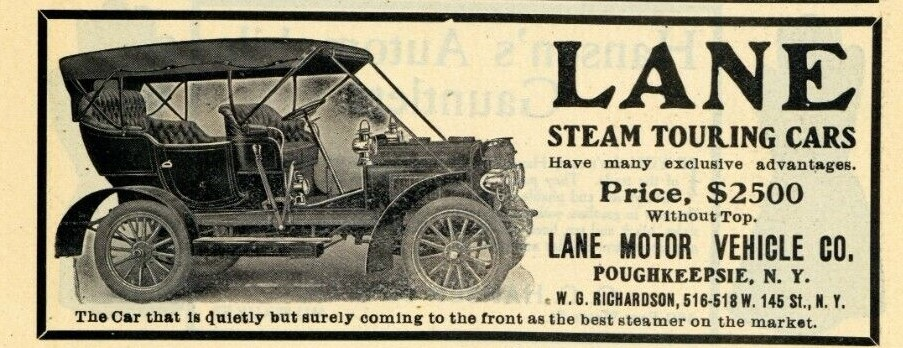
1907 Lane Steam Touring Advertisement

== See also ==
- Lane Motor Vehicle Co at the Virtual Steam Car Museum
- Two Lane Steam Cars were extant in 2022, a 1901 Runabout and a 1909 Model 15 Tourer
- Lane Model 15 at PreWarCar
