= Kent's Pacemaker =

Defunct American motor vehicle manufacturer

Overview
- Manufacturer: Colonial Automobile Company
- Production: 1900
- Assembly: United States
- Designer: A.W. Kent

Powertrain
- Propulsion: Steam car

The Kent's Pacemaker was a veteran era American automobile manufactured only in 1900.

== History ==
Offered by the Colonial company of Boston, it was a steam car which had one wheel in front for steering, and three rear wheels. The center of these drove; the others, an outer pair, could be raised to allow the machine to "coast like a bicycle". The vehicle was named after A. W. Kent, who was its designer.
