= Waltham Steam =

Defunct American motor vehicle manufacturer

The Waltham Steam was an American steam car.

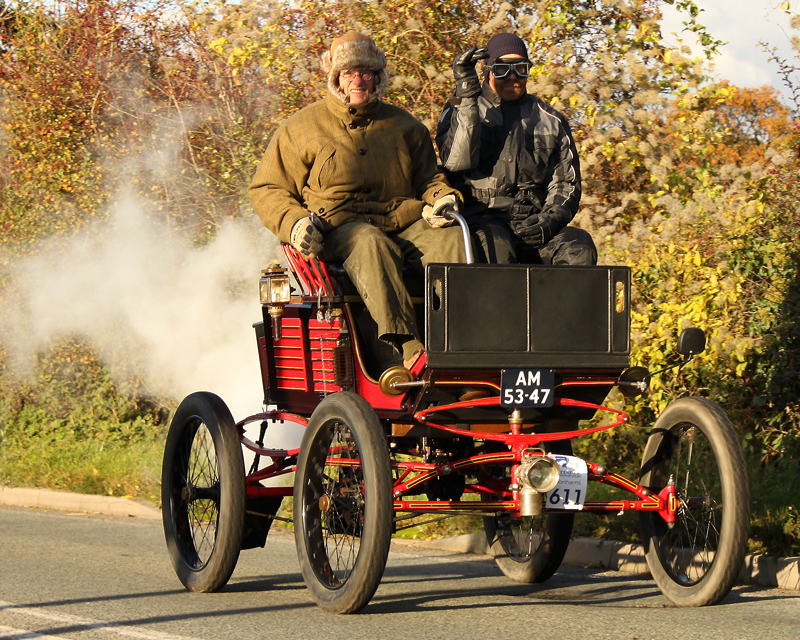
Waltham Steam 6 hp (4.5 kW) spindle-seat runabout entrant, London to Brighton Veteran Car Run, 2010

== George Tinker and John Piper ==
Engineers George M. Tinker and John W. Piper were employees of the Waltham Manufacturing Company, at that time makers of Orient brand bicycles in Waltham, Massachusetts. In 1898, they were allowed by the company's owner, Charles Herman Metz, to build a light steam buggy at a corner of the plant. This vehicle was finished at the end of the year and named the Waltham Steam. It had a very light 50 lb (23 kg), 3 hp (2.2 kW) two cylinder, double acting steam engine. The copper-built condenser weighted in at 110 lb (50 kg), and the complete vehicle at only 600 lb (270 kg). It had wire wheels, and steering was provided by a vertically mounted lever. Tinker and Piper exhibited their steam buggy at the Boston Automobile Show in 1898.

Two more steam cars followed under the label Tinker & Piper. Meantime, Metz had sold out his company to Charles A. Coffin and H.P. Clough but stayed in the position of a general manager. Coffin was an executive of the General Electric Company (GE). Seeking markets for GE products, he ordered a light electric car to be made by Tinker and Piper. They built it also at the Waltham Manufacturing plant. It had a wheelbase of 60 in (150 cm) and an electric motor by General Electric. It was presented as the Orient Electric at the New York Cycle & Automobile Show in 1899. Neither Tinker and Piper nor Metz were impressed, and there were no more electric vehicles to follow.

== Waltham Automobile Company ==
In 1899 or early 1900, Tinker and Piper left the Waltham Manufacturing Company through consensual agreement with, and support from, Charles Metz, to start their own business. Their Waltham Automobile Company was located at 130-136 Newton Street in Waltham and started building small steam-powered stanhopes that sold for $750 with a Victoria top. Further, there might have been some steamers with Vis-à-vis coachwork.

Production ended in 1902 or 1903.

Of the unknown number of Waltham steam vehicles built, one Stanhope is still in existence.

== Waltham of Springfield, Massachusetts ==
An unrelated company in Springfield, Massachusetts also produced a steam powered automobile under the Waltham name in 1905.

== See also ==
- Brass Era car
- List of defunct United States automobile manufacturers

== Sources ==
- Beverly Rae Kimes (ed.) and Henry Austin Clark, jr.: The Standard Catalogue of American Cars 1805–1942, 2nd edition, Krause Publications, Iola WI 54990, USA (1985), ISBN 0-87341-111-0
- Beverly Rae Kimes (ed.) and Henry Austin Clark, jr.: The Standard Catalogue of American Cars 1805–1942, 3rd edition, Krause Publications, Iola WI 54990, USA (1985), ISBN 978-0-87341-428-9
- G. N. Georgano (ed.): Complete Encyclopedia of Motorcars, 1885 to the Present; Dutton Press, New York, 2nd edition (Hardcover) 1973, ISBN 0-525-08351-0
- Beverly Rae Kimes: Pioneers, Engineers, and Scoundrels: The Dawn of the Automobile in America. editors: SAE (Society of Automotive Engineers) Permissions, Warrendale PA 2005, ISBN 0-7680-1431-X (Hardcover).
