= Aultman =

Defunct American motor vehicle manufacturer

The Aultman Company
- Founded: 1895
- Headquarters: Canton, Ohio, United States
- Products: Road locomotives, steam automobiles

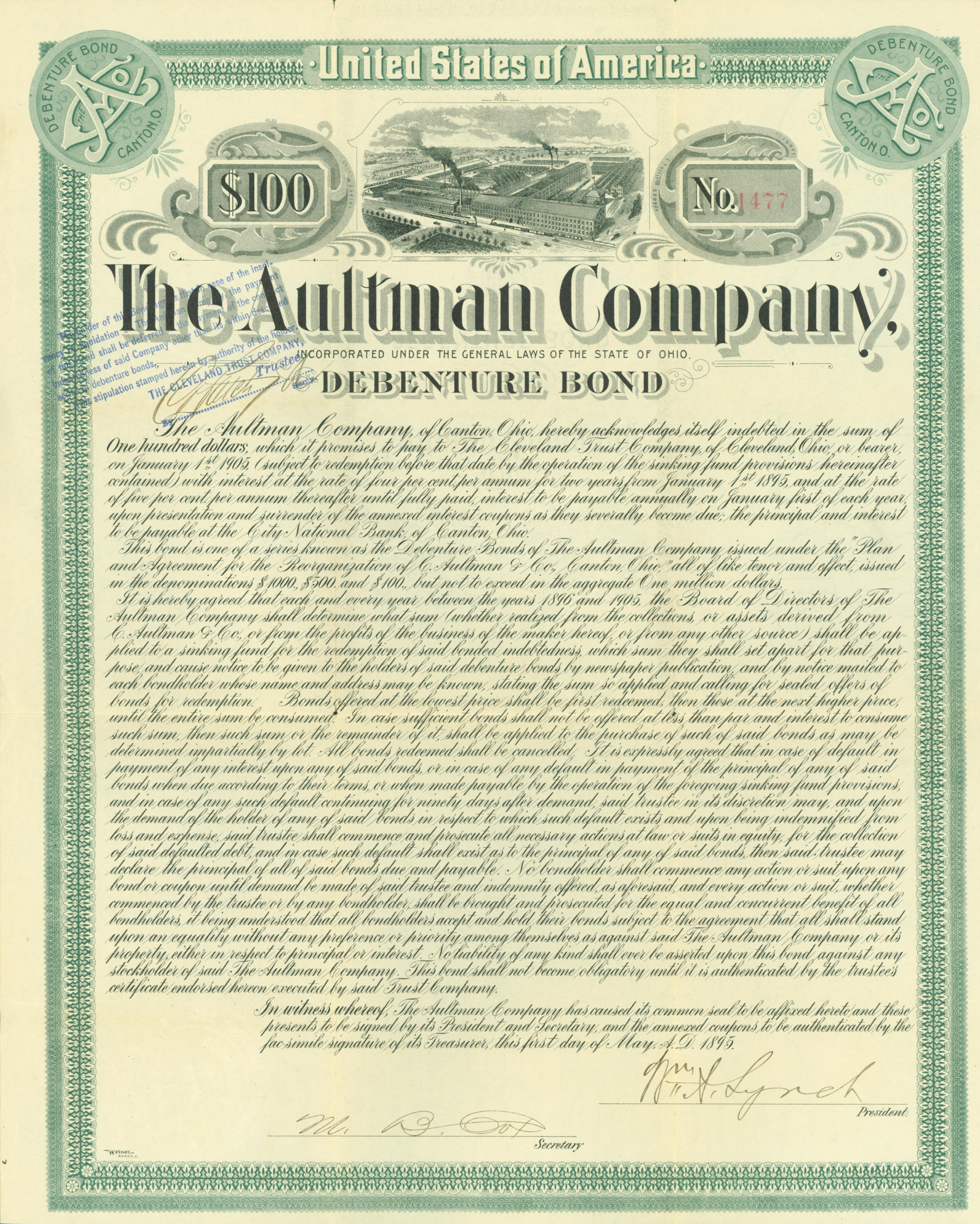
Debenture Bond of the Aultman Company, issued 1 May 1895

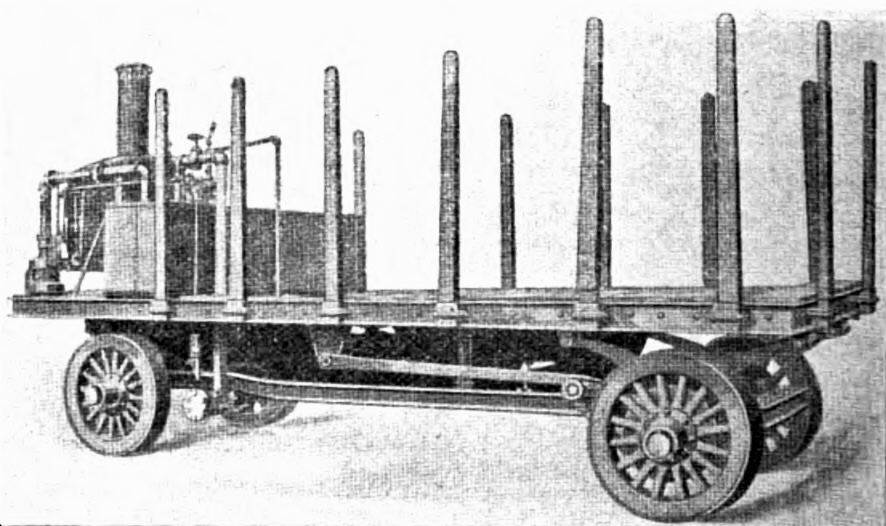
Aultman four-wheel-drive steam truck (1902)

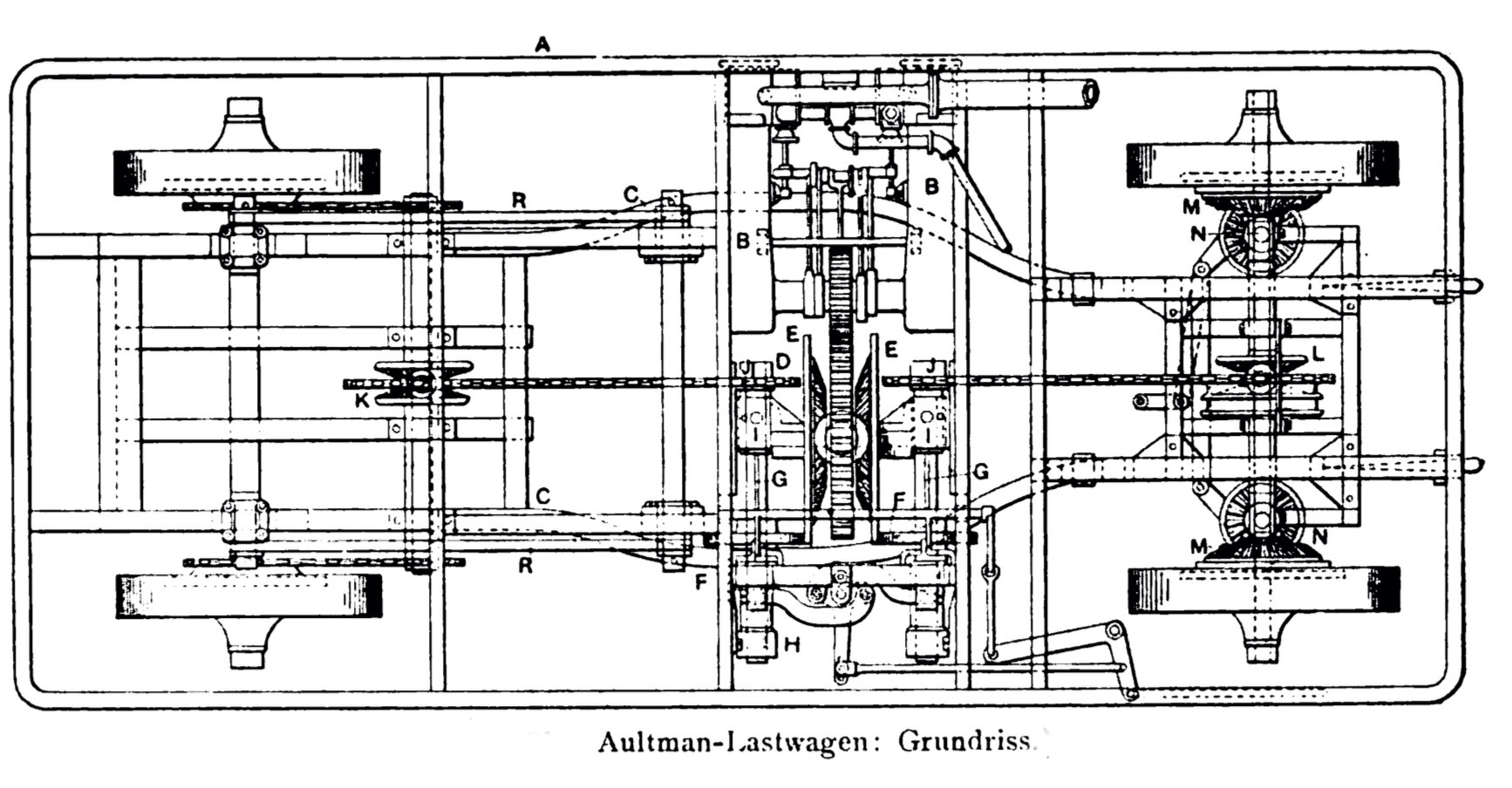
Aultman four-wheel-drive steam truck top

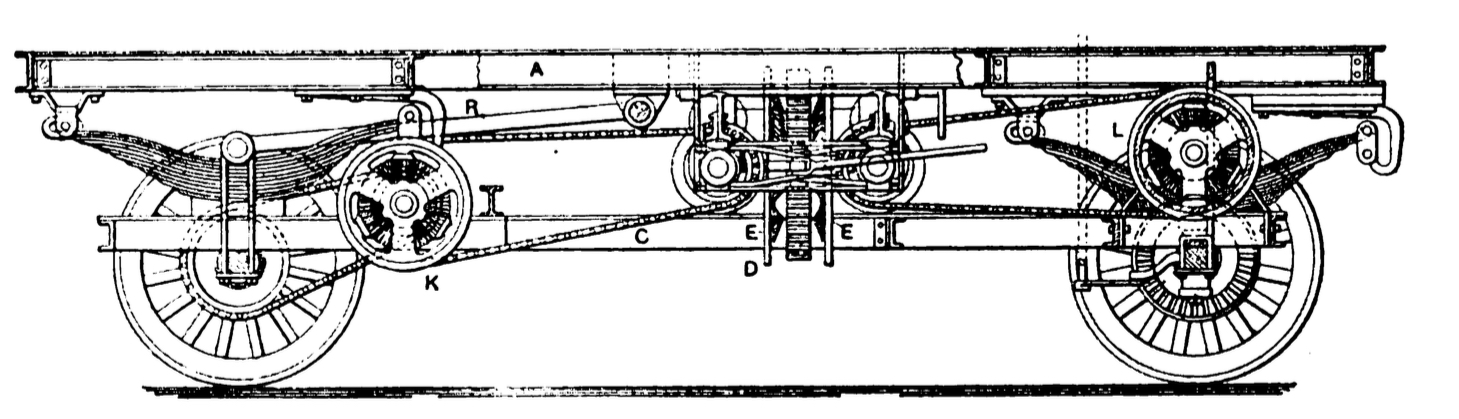
Aultman four-wheel-drive steam truck side

The Aultman was a 1901 American automobile manufactured in Canton, Ohio; the light steam carriage, whose makers also built a four-wheel-drive steam truck, was built for only a few years.

== History ==
By 1904, the Aultman Road Locomotive was advertised nationally in Dun's Review and was described as "specially designed for heavy hauling at mines, lumber camps, smelters, quarries, etc., and for contractors, road and irrigation work." It was also noted that it was suitable for freight lines from towns "off the railroads."

== Advertisements ==
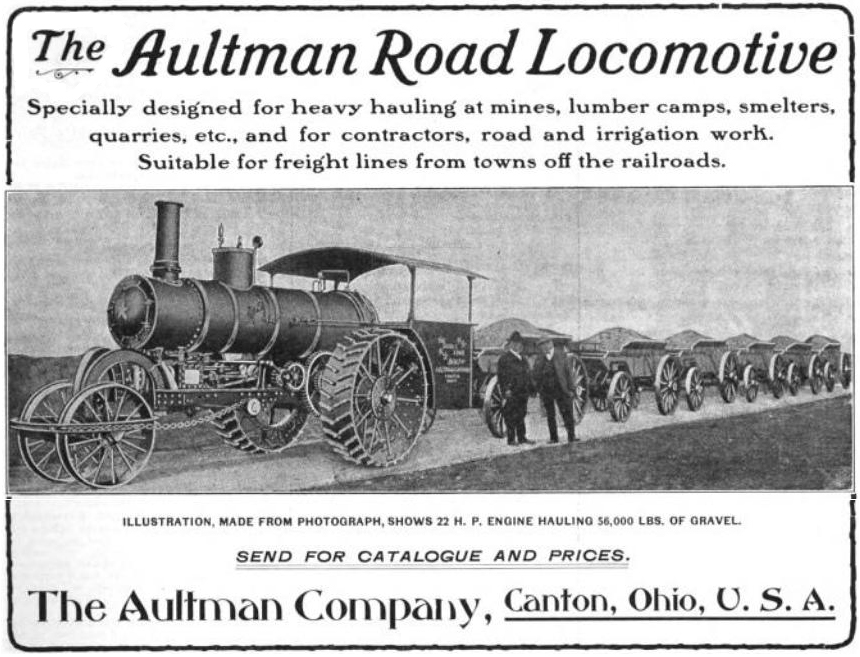
The Aultman Company - Road Locomotive - Canton, Ohio - 1904
