= Riley & Cowley =

American marine engineering firm

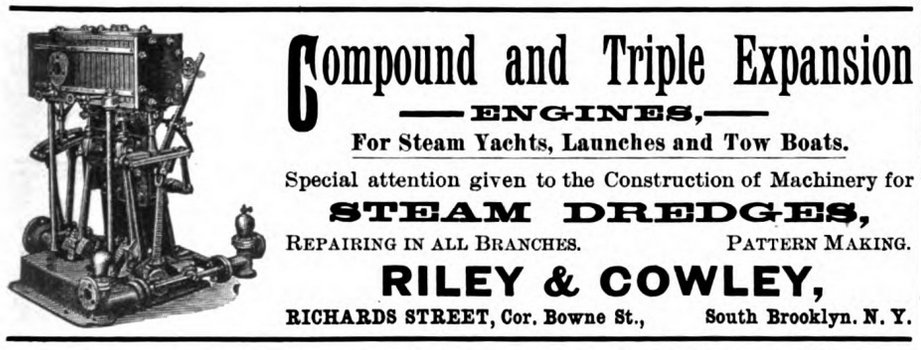
- An 1887 company advertisement
- Company type: Private
- Industry: Engineering
- Founded: 1869
- Founders: Reuben Riley; Robert Cowley
- Defunct: 1905
- Fate: Dissolved
- Successor: The Riley Machine Works
- Headquarters: Brooklyn, New York, United States
- Products: Marine steam engines; Screw propellers; Dredging equipment and other marine machinery
- Services: Engine and boiler repairs
- Number of employees: 55 (1888); 100 (1902)

Riley & Cowley was an American marine engineering firm established in 1869 in Brooklyn, New York. The company specialized in the design and manufacture of marine steam engines for small watercraft such as steam yachts, launches and tugboats, and was particularly noted for its light and compact, high-performance, compound and triple expansion engines. The company also produced screw propellers, dredging machinery and other marine equipment.

By the 1880s, the company was building engines for the pleasure craft of some of New York's wealthiest men such as R. V. Pierce and Pierre Lorillard III, and by 1890 it was producing some of the smallest triple-expansion engines then built in the United States. In 1902, the company also built a steam car. The company was dissolved in 1905 following the death of one of its founders.

== Company history ==
=== Establishment ===
Reuben Riley was an assistant engineer with the United States Navy during the American Civil War. After receiving his discharge in 1865, Riley returned to New York where, together with engineer Robert Cowley and George Besser, he established a machine shop at 3 Summit Street, Brooklyn, which traded under the name Riley, Cowley & Besser. This partnership was dissolved in October 1868 with the departure of Besser, but Riley and Cowley retained their business association.

In 1869, the two remaining partners established a new machine shop in Brooklyn with the company name Riley & Cowley. Prior to 1879, the company was located at 187 Van Brunt Street, on the corner of Van Brunt and Bowne Streets. Riley and Cowley eventually acquired a property on the corner of Richards and Bowne Streets, Brooklyn, and in 1879, plans were announced for the construction on this site of "two one and two-story brick shops, 40x60 and 100 [ft], tin roof and wooden and brick cornice". After the relocation of the company to this address, these buildings appear to have been utilized as "a machine shop, blacksmith shop, pattern shop ... and storehouse." The company would remain at this address for the balance of its 36-year history.

=== Activities ===
Riley & Cowley specialized in the design and manufacture of compound and triple expansion steam propeller engines for small watercraft such as yachts, launches and tow boats. They also designed and built single-cylinder marine engines, marine propellers and machinery for steam dredges, as well as making engine and boiler repairs. Riley & Cowley engines had a reputation for speed, reliability, economy, compactness, lightness and ease of maintenance. In particular, the company's attention to balancing all parts of an engine to reduce or eliminate vibration resulted in engines capable of achieving optimal performance. Some engines were sufficiently self-contained and light in weight that they could be readily removed from the hull for winter storage.

Engines built by the company were distributed to "all parts of the United States". The company employed 55 people by the mid-1880s, about half of whom were machinists; the number of employees had risen to 100 by 1902, about forty of whom were machinists.

By the 1880s, Riley & Cowley were supplying engines to members of New York's elite yachting set. Clients of the company included leading political and business identities such as Brooklyn mayor James Howell, patent medicine manufacturer Ray Vaughn Pierce, heir to the Aspinwall fortune, the Rev. John A. Aspinwall, and others. (Note: See production table.)

In 1890, the company supplied what was then reportedly the smallest triple-expansion engine built in the United States—with cylinders of 4, 6.5 and 10 inches (10, 17 and 25 cm) by 8-inch (20 cm) stroke—for Aspinwall's steam launch Secret. An engine of similar pattern was also installed in the steam launch Lillian, a vessel built for tobacco heir Pierre Lorillard III for use as a hunting launch along the East Coast. These 75 hp (56 kW), 450 rpm triple expansion engines operated at a steam pressure of about 250 psi (1,700 kPa) and were characterized by "simplicity of construction and accessibility of parts", making them "peculiarly adapted" to their purpose. The engines also featured a simple reversing mechanism that dispensed with the usual linkages. This model of small triple-expansion powerplant seems to have been particularly successful for the company, the type eventually finding its way into "many steam launches and yachts where it has given excellent satisfaction". The company would later build even smaller triple-expansion engines.

An unusual watercraft to receive a Riley & Cowley engine in 1890 was an "unsinkable" 58-foot (18 m) steam yawl which the inventor, Captain Frank Norton, planned to take across the Atlantic as proof of concept. The engine supplied for this vessel was a 30 hp (22 kW) compound type with cylinders of 5.5 and 10 inches (14 and 25 cm), an operating pressure of 120 psi (830 kPa) and coal consumption of about 1/2 ton per day.

In 1891, Riley & Cowley completed the engine for a fast steam launch for the Yale College Boat Club. The launch, intended to keep pace with rowing regattas, had a speed requirement of 14 miles per hour (23 km/h), but several other companies had tried and failed to meet the requirement. Riley & Cowley supplied a triple expansion engine with cylinders of 5, 8 and 13.5 inches (13, 20 and 34 cm) with 8-inch (20 cm) stroke, which in trials handily exceeded the requirement by recording a speed of 16.5 mph (26.6 km/h).

Around the same time, a fast steam launch, named Norwood, was completed for Norman L. Munro at the yard of C. D. Mosher. Mosher built both the launch and its engine, but the latter failed to produce adequate performance until overhauled by Riley & Cowley. After the overhaul, Norwood broke the record between New York Harbor and Sandy Hook in a race with the fast steamer Monmouth, covering the 14-mile (23 km) distance in 32 minutes or better than 26 mph (42 km/h; 23 kn), thus laying claim to being not only the fastest vessel in New York Harbor, but the fastest steam launch in the world, rivalling that of some naval torpedo boats of the day. Her top speed was said to be in excess of 30 miles per hour (48 km/h; 26 kn).

==== Marine engine gallery ====
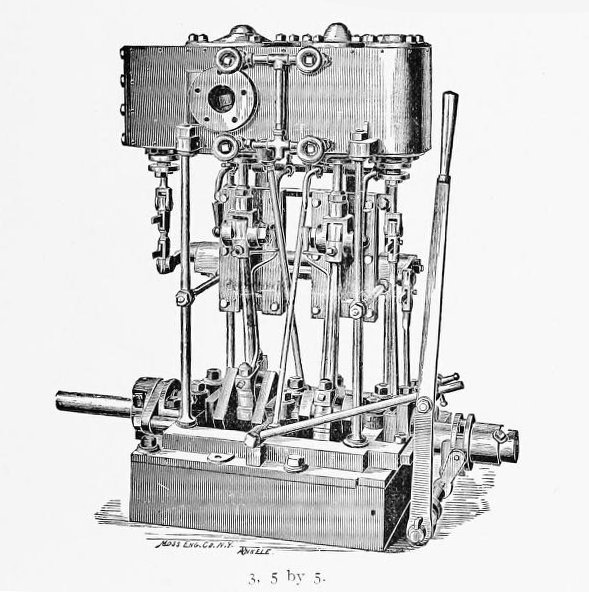
3 and 5 by 5 in (7.6 and 12.7 by 12.7 cm) compound

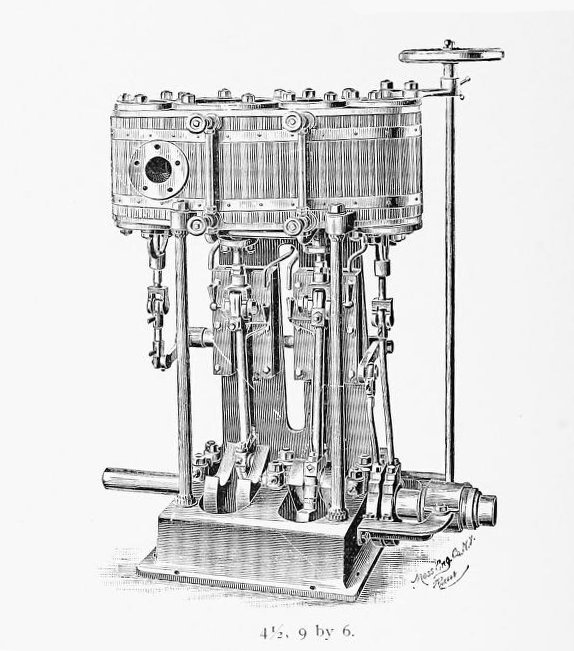
4.5 and 9 by 6 in (11 and 23 by 15 cm) compound

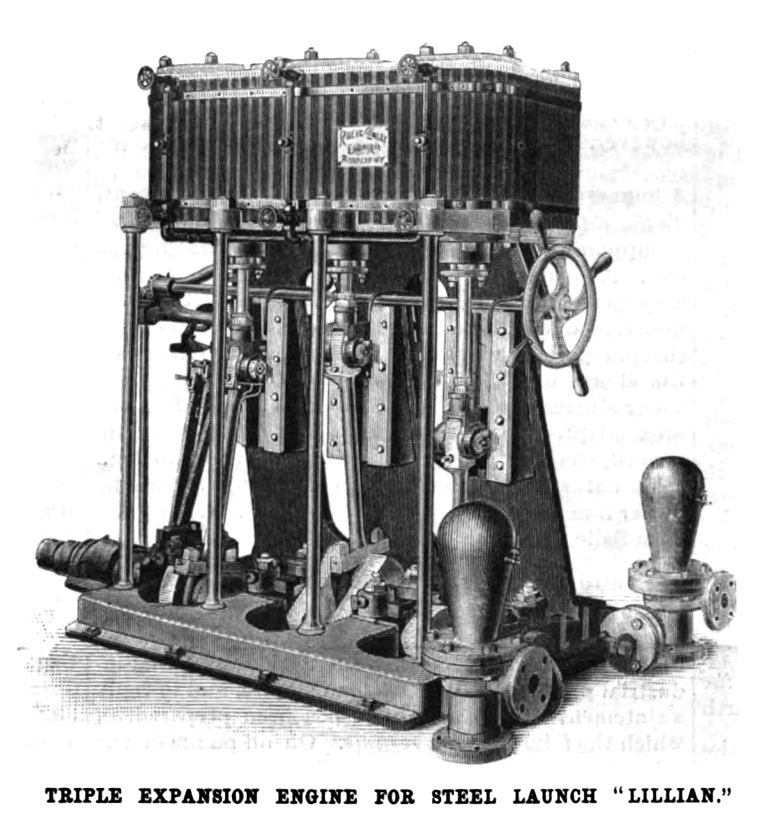
4, 6.5 and 10 by 8 in (10, 17 and 25 by 20 cm) triple expansion

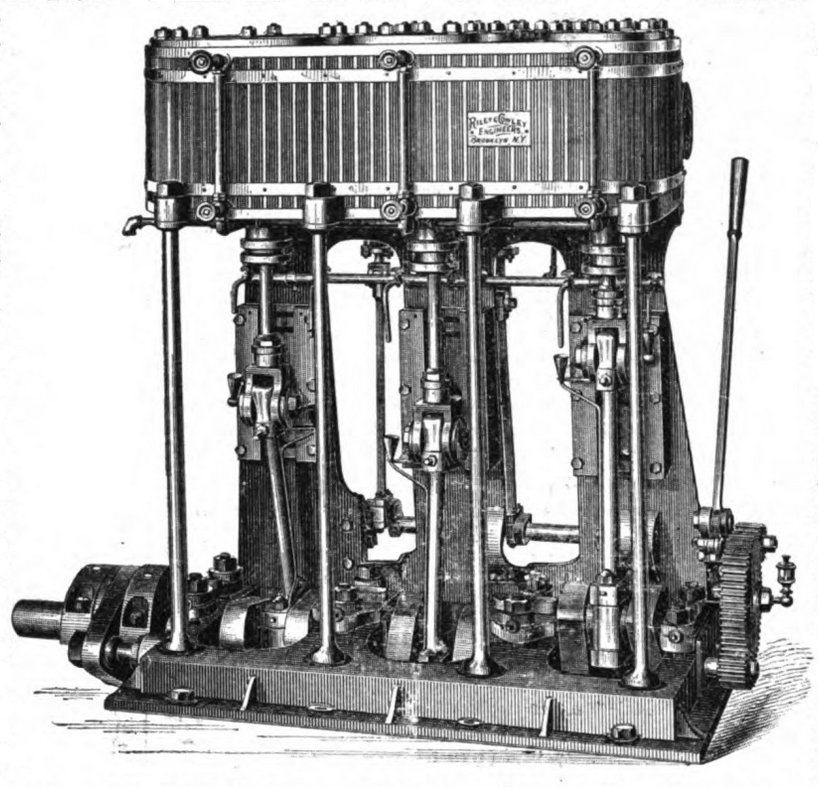
5, 8 and 13.5 by 8 in (13, 20 and 34 by 20 cm) triple expansion

==== Steam car ====
In 1902, Riley & Cowley built a steam car to the order of one B. M. Whitlock, (Note: Probably the New York yachting uniform manufacturer.) in the style of "a high powered, foreign gasoline touring car". The vehicle, which seated two people, had a wheelbase of 8 feet 6 inches (2.59 m) and weighed about 4,000 lb (1,800 kg) in all, "including supplies". The vehicle had two gears—which operated in both forward and reverse, as the engine was run in reverse to reverse the vehicle. The driver steered by means of a 16-inch (41 cm) wheel on an inclined column. Two brakes were provided—a steam and a foot brake.

The powerplant, a compound steam engine with cylinder bores of 3 and 6 inches (7.6 and 15.2 cm) and a stroke of 6 inches (15 cm), was capable of developing 12 bhp (8.9 kW) at 150 psi (1,000 kPa) or 15 bhp (11 kW) at 300 psi (2,100 kPa); side-chain drive was used to transmit power to the wheels. The boiler, a fire-tube type 18 inches (46 cm) in height, was placed at the front of the vehicle, concealed beneath an aluminium bonnet. A fuel tank with a capacity of 25 US gallons (95 L; 21 imp gal) was located at the extreme rear, while the water tank, with a capacity of 100 US gallons (380 L; 83 imp gal), was fitted in the body. "Ingenious" exhaust pipes carried the exhaust gases to the rear of the vehicle. Suspension of the vehicle was by leaf springs. The wheels were fitted with 32-by-2.5-inch (81.3 cm × 6.4 cm) hardened fabric tyres, which could be inflated by means of an inbuilt air pump. This vehicle appears to have been the only steam car ever built by the company.

=== Closure ===
Following the death of Robert Cowley, senior partner in the firm, in January 1905, the company was wound up. In June, the entire equipment of the company, including patterns for engines, propellers, gears, pumps and other machinery, was offered for private sale.

A few weeks later, in July, the surviving partner, Reuben Riley, established a new business at 192 24th Street, Brooklyn, The Riley Machine Works, capitalized at $6,500 (equivalent to $227,476 in 2024). Incorporators of the new firm were Riley, his wife Amanda and son Frank, with Riley serving as company president and Frank as vice-president and general manager. The firm offered "special attention to marine repairs". This company appears to have been dissolved around the time of the death of Riley's wife in May 1908. (Note: Judging by the company's advertising history; the company advertised regularly until August 1908 when advertising ceases and is not renewed.)

== About the proprietors ==
Reuben Riley was born in Tuckahoe, Westchester County, New York, on October 25, 1838. He received a "good public school education" before travelling to New York in 1854, where he completed a five-year apprenticeship as a machinist and engineer with Henry Esler & Co. of South Brooklyn. During the American Civil War, Riley joined the United States Navy, serving from 1863 to the end of the war aboard USS Honeysuckle, during which time he was promoted from Assistant Engineer to 2nd Assistant Engineer. Discharged from the Navy on August 21, 1865, he returned to New York to co-found the firm of Riley & Cowley.

Riley married Amanda Hilliker of Tuckahoe, New York in 1860. The couple had four children, including Frank M. Riley, who followed his father into the family business. Riley was a Freemason, an Aid-de-Camp to the Commander in Chief, Grand Army of the Republic, and a member of the board of trustees of the Brooklyn Bridge. A respected engineer, he is known to have given a number of well-received lectures in the field. (Note: Examples:) He became wealthy as a result of his business activities.

Robert Cowley, an engineer, was born in Stockton-on-Tees, England, on January 19, 1836, and emigrated to North America as a young man. He married a Canadian-born woman, Annie Ramsay, in Toronto, Canada, on January 3, 1860. The couple had two children together, Charles Ramsey, who followed his father into the family business, and a daughter Ida, later Mrs. Ida L. Knapp.

In addition to his work with Riley & Cowley, Cowley was a director of the Hamilton Bank. He was a devout Christian and a board member of the First Place Methodist Church of Brooklyn, which he attended three times a week—for prayer meetings every Wednesday and twice on Sundays. He was also a keen art collector, accumulating a substantial gallery of works through the course of his life, including "many ... by the old masters." Cowley died suddenly on January 12, 1905, at the age of 68. He was survived by his wife and children.

== Production table ==
The following table represents only a sample of engines built by the company, for some of the more notable watercraft.

Some notable watercraft powered by Riley & Cowley engines
Watercraft								Engine				Notes; references (Note: In this column, "ON" = US Registry official number.)
Name (Note: Name of vessel. When a vessel had more than one name in the course of its career, the names are listed chronologically in descending order.)	Type (Note: Type of watercraft. All vessels in the table were screw-propelled.)	Yr. (Note: Year built.)	Len. (Note: Length in feet.)	Designer	Builder	Original owner	Original homeport (Note: So far as can be determined.)	Type (Note: Type of engine. Abbreviations as follows: LP = low pressure; C = compound; TE = triple expansion; FA = fore-and-aft; I = inverted. Note that while only one of the engines listed in this table is documented as inverted, all the engines listed were likely inverted since by this time screw engines of the inverted type had become the standard pattern and the "inverted" descriptor was therefore considered superfluous.)	Cyl. (ins) (Note: Cylinder (bore) size in inches.)	Str. (ins) (Note: Stroke in inches.)	ihp; (Note: Indicated horsepower.)	Notes; references
Port Chester; Sagamore ^{02}	Freight steamer	1879	100.0		Lawrence & Foulks	Ferris & Studwell	Port Chester, NY	LP	20	22		ON 150166. Freight steamer; later a passenger boat. Abandoned 1936.
Minitaga; Leon Albert; Sybil	Steam yacht	1886	37.6	Dr. S. Church	J. G. Purdy	Dr. Stuart Church (Note: Owner's given name spelled "Stewart" in some sources.)	Brooklyn	C	4, 7.75	6		
Charlotte; Nixie	Steam yacht	1887	40.0	A. L. Riker	J. Lennox	W. J. Riker	New York, NY	C	4.5, 8	6		
Nomad	Steam yacht	1887	74.0	Jacob Lorillard	Samuel H. Pine	Adrian Iselin, Jr (Note: Son of New York financier Adrian Georg Iselin.)	New York, NY	TE	6.5, 10, 16	10		
Orrmoore	Steam yacht	1887	67.0	Dr. Stuart Church	Samuel Ayers	A. E. Orr	New York NY	C	6, 9	6	28	
Dandy	Steam yacht	~1888	57.0			Frank Boyer	New York, NY	TE	4, 6, 10	8		
Frolic	Steam yacht	1889	50.0	Samuel Ayers	Samuel Ayers	Robert Mayfield		TE	4.5, 6.5, 10	8		
Cygnet	Steam launch	~1889	47.0			Dr. Stuart Church	Brooklyn, NY	C				
Crescent	Steam launch	~1889				O. S. Presbrey	Port Henry, NY	C				
Secret	Steam yacht	1889	58.0	Samuel Ayers	Samuel Ayers	J. A. Aspinwall		TE	4, 6, 10	8.5		
	Steam yawl	1890	58.0	Frank Norton		Frank Norton		C	5.5, 10		30	Experimental "unsinkable" boat built for transatlantic voyage.
Lillian	Steam launch	1890	65.0		Jonson Iron Works	Pierre Lorillard III		TE	4, 6.5, 10	8	75	Designed for hunting expeditions on the rivers of Florida.
Mary L.; Elise	Steam yacht	1890	37.0	Seabury & Co.	Seabury & Co.	W. Fred Lawrence		C	4.5, 9	8		
Nydia	Steam yacht	1890	122.5	Henry J. Gielow	H. C. Wintringham	R. V. Pierce	Buffalo, NY	FA/C/I	11, 22	15		
	Steam launch	1891	53.0		Samuel Ayers	Yale College Boat Club		TE	5, 8, 13.5	8		Fast launch designed to keep pace with rowboat races
Vulcan	Steam yacht	1891	72.0	J. B. Baugh	J. B. Baugh	J. B. Baugh (Note: The source gives the owner's name as "J. I. Baught"; presumably this is a transcription error as Manning's Yacht Register lists the designer/builder as "J. B. Baugh".)		TE	6, 10, 16	10		"[F]or use on the [Great] lakes".
	Steam launch	1892			Gas Engine & Power Co.	City Dock Dept. (NY)	New York, NY					
	Steam launch	1892	40.0			C. TenEycke		C	4.5, 9	6		"[F]or carrying passengers from the railroad depot to the hotel" (on Greenwood Lake).
	Steam launch	1892	52.0		B. McCarrick	James Howell		TE	4, 6, 10	8		"[T]o be used on Lake Champlain as a pleasure boat".
Espadon	Steam launch	1892	35.0	A. Carey Smith	Seabury & Co.			FA/C	3, 6	5		
Kanaka	Steam yacht	1892	52.0	Roberts Safety Water Tube Co.	Roberts Safety Water Tube Co.			C	4.5, 9	6		
Maspeth; Golden Fleece	Steam yacht	1894	84.0	Gas Engine & Power Co.	Gas Engine & Power Co.			TE	6.5, 10, 16	10		
Telka	Steam yacht	1896	85.0	Henry J. Gielow	J. F. Hawkins	Benjamin M. Whitlock		C	7, 14	9		
Kittewan; Nautilus	Steam yacht	1900	109.0	Hiram Wellers & Sons	Hiram Wellers & Sons			TE	6.5, 10, 16	10		Twin-screw steamer with two engines
	Yacht tender	1903	27.5	Wintringham		Henry J. Gielow		TE	3, 5, 8	5		
Gadabout	Steam launch	1904	43.5	E. B. Schock	E. M. Fulton	E. M. Fulton		C	4, 8	6		
