= Standard Steam Car =

Defunct American motor vehicle manufacturer

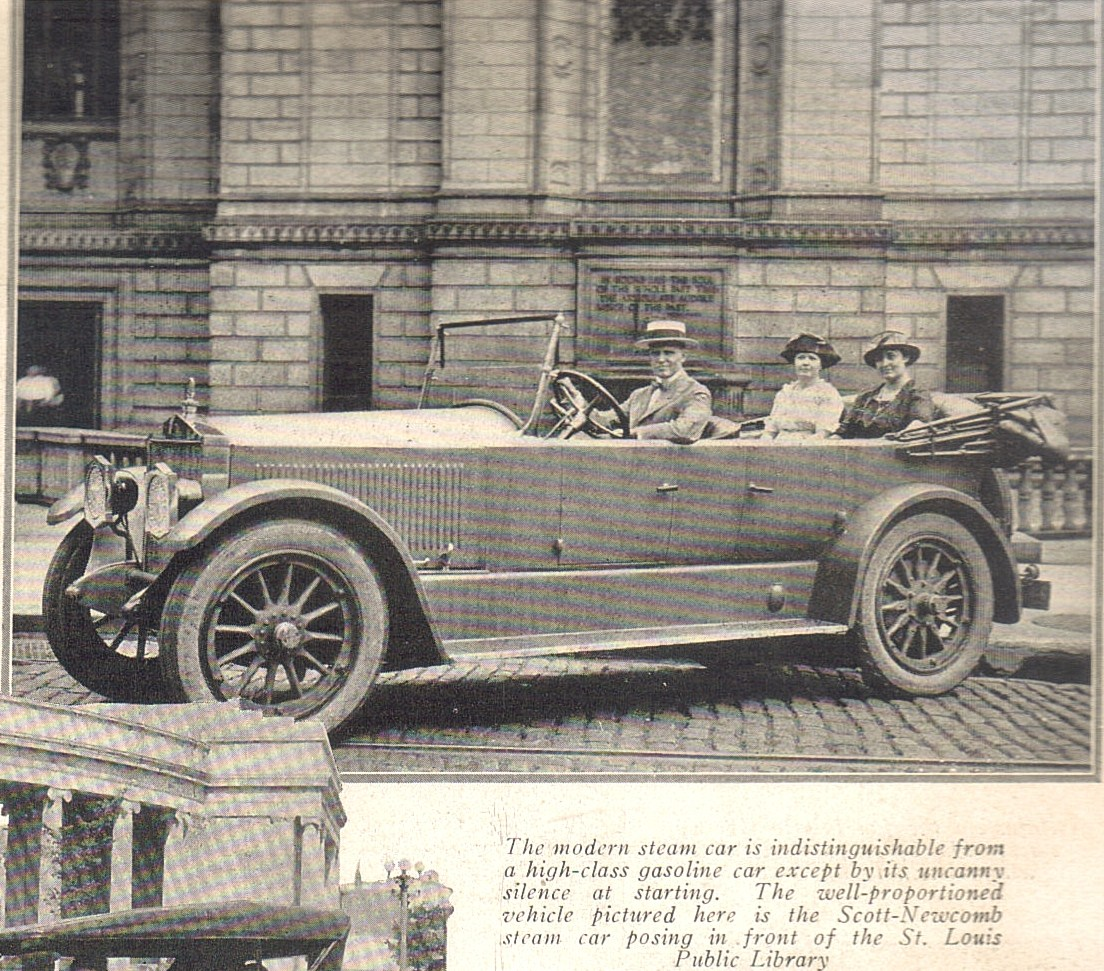
Scott-Newcomb Steam Car

The Standard Steam Car was an American steam car manufactured by the Standard Engineering Company of St Louis, Missouri from 1920 until 1921.

== History ==
L. L. Scott and E. C. Newcomb developed a steam car claimed to be able to raise a full head of steam within a minute. . Also known as the Scott-Newcomb, it featured a front condenser that resembled a Rolls-Royce shaped radiator and was similar in appearance to the Roamer. The car had a twin-cylinder horizontal steam engine and used kerosene for fuel. The boiler pressure was stated as 600psi.

The Scott-Newcomb Motor Car Company was formed for production but only one touring car is known to have been built; the company may have produced as many as five vehicles before folding.

A 3-page article from 1920 on technical aspects of the Standard Steam Car appears in Floyd Clymer's Historical Motor Scrapbook, Steam Car Edition, published in 1945.
