= Strathmore Automobile Company =

Defunct American motor vehicle manufacturer

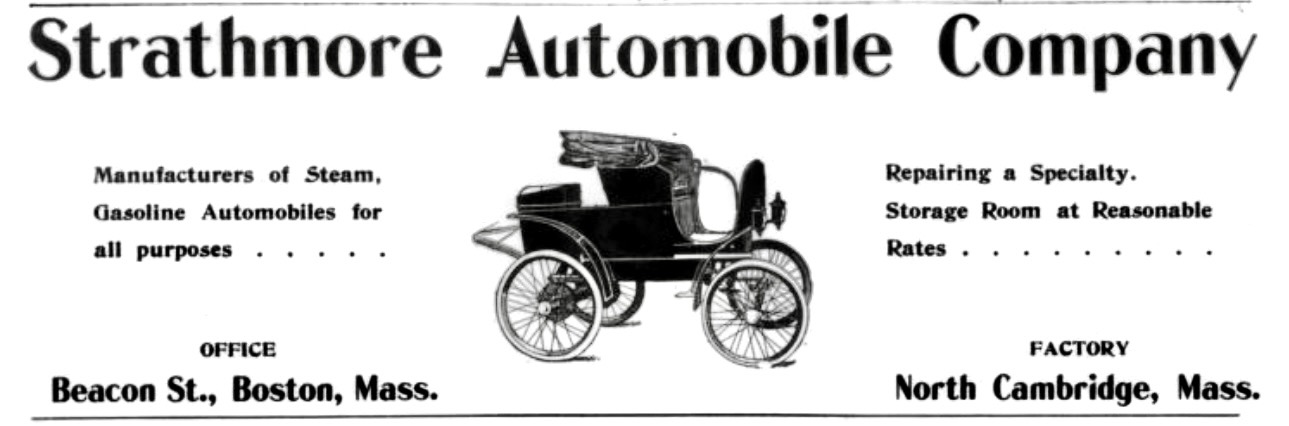
Strathmore Automobile Company advertisement (1901)

Strathmore was an American automobile company started in 1899. They made gas and steam powered vehicles.
