= Albany (1903 automobile) =

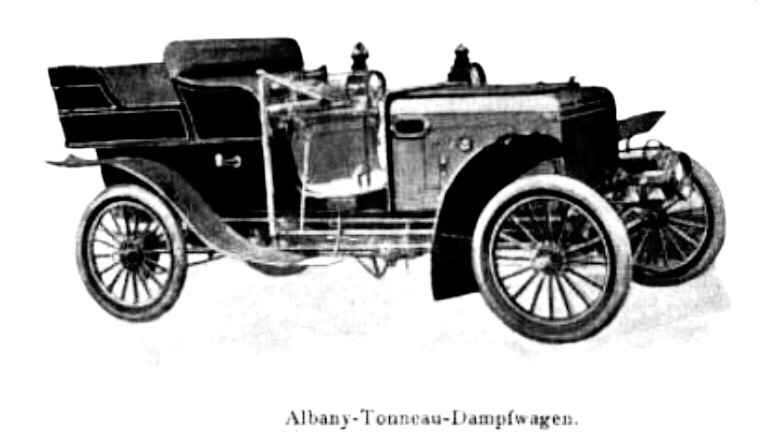
Albany steam car (1903)

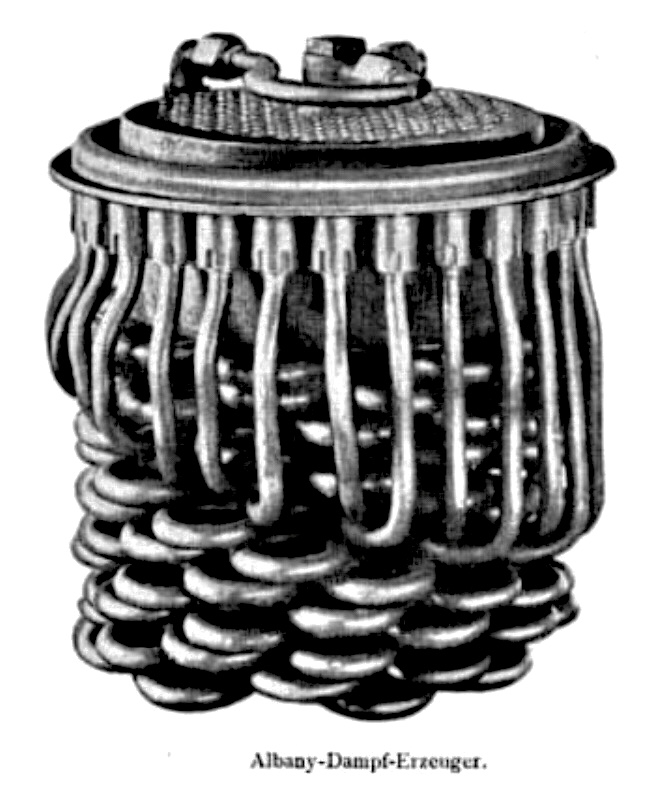
Albany steam generator (1903)

The Albany was a British car made in London from 1903 to 1905. Albany Manufacturing Co. Ltd made both petrol and steam cars, the steamers designed by Frederick Lamplough, who had originally built a shaft-driven steamer in 1896. Better known as the Lamplough-Albany, it sported two engines coupled by cranks at right angles and a super-heated coil-type generator. It could be steered either by wheel or tiller, and it appeared much like a petroleum-fueled car. It was offered for a single model year, 1903, while the petrol vehicles, one a 10 hp (7.5 kW) single-cylinder and the other a 16 hp 2-cylinder, lasted for three. After the middle of 1905, Albany shifted its attention to selling Talbots and manufacturing parts.

== See also ==
- List of car manufacturers of the United Kingdom
