= Xander (automobile) =

Defunct American motor vehicle manufacturer

The Xander automobile company was founded in 1901 by John G. Xander in Reading, Pennsylvania. This was after 10 years in the bicycle business. His first cars were steam, then gasoline engines were used. He only built his car custom order. In 1902, he stopped.
