= Empire (1901 automobile) =

Defunct American motor vehicle manufacturer

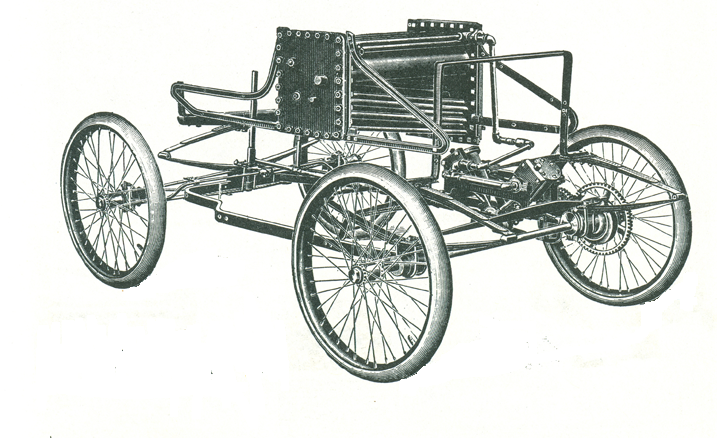
1901 Empire Steam Car

The Empire was an American automobile manufactured from 1901 until 1902. A product of Sterling, Illinois, it featured a vee-twin steam engine geared to its right-hand rear wheel. It had a rectangular, transverse mounted boiler with horizontal tubes across the chassis. Coachwork was of the motor buggy style.

Built by the Empire Manufacturing Co. (soon to be renamed the Empire Automobile Co.) in Sterling, Illinois, it was offered for only $750; the popular Oldsmobile Curved Dash cost $650.

Essentially the same car was built 1901-1902 by the Sterling Automobile & Engine Co. When this company failed to pay its factory mortgage the company was sold by the sheriff's office for $1,300 and manufacture halted.
