= White and Poppe =

1899–1933 British engine manufacturer

White and Poppe Limited
- Company type: Private
- Industry: petrol engines and other major automotive components
- Founder: Alfred James White and Peter August Poppe
- Fate: taken over by biggest customer in 1919, liquidated 1933
- Headquarters: Holbrook Lane, Coventry, United Kingdom
- Area served: United Kingdom
- Key people: Alfred James White; Peter August Poppe; John Cawsey Dennis; Herbert Raymond Dennis
- Owner: family of A J White until 1919; then Dennis Brothers Limited
- Number of employees: 13,500 (1918)
- Parent: Dennis Brothers Limited

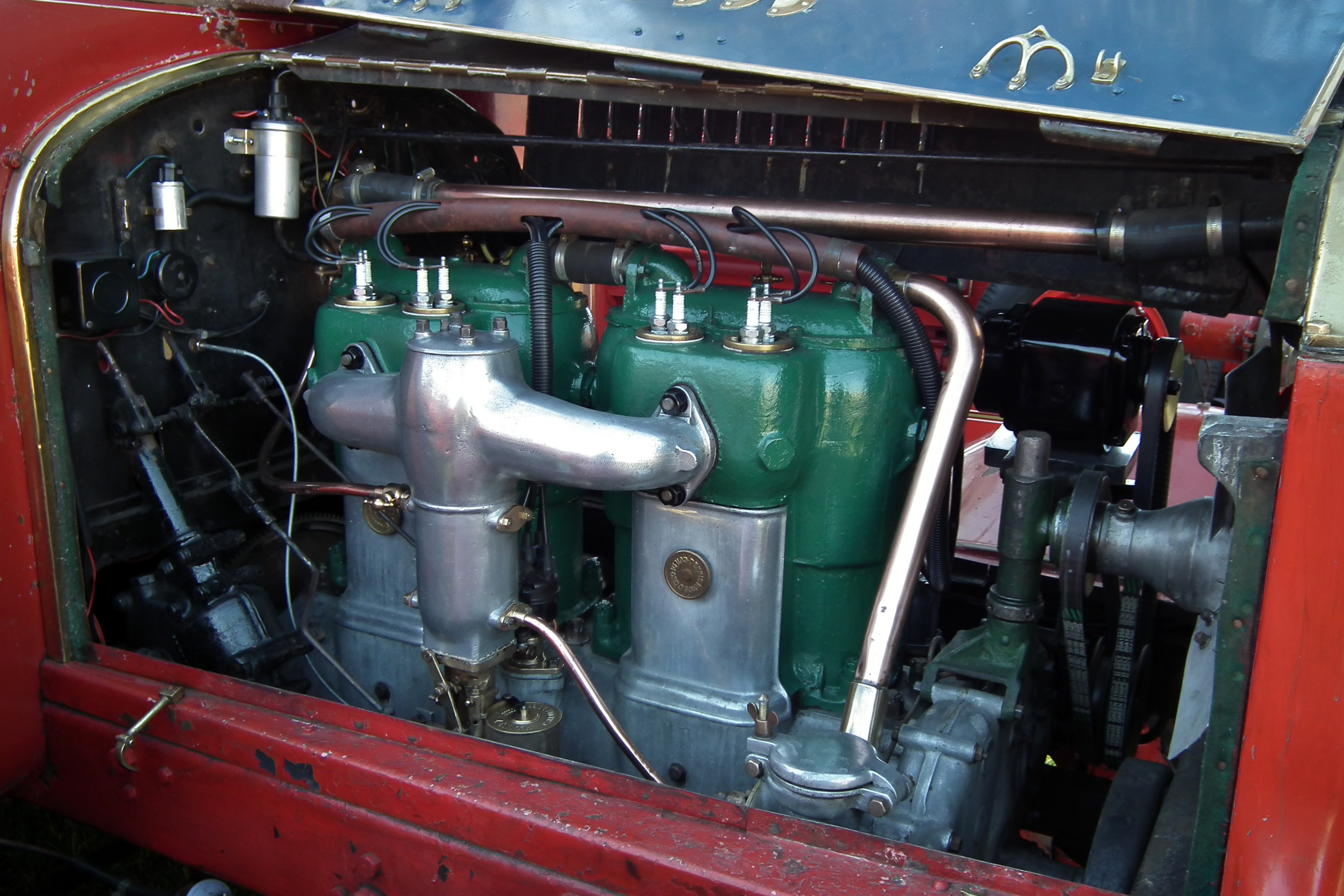
1928 off side (inlet)

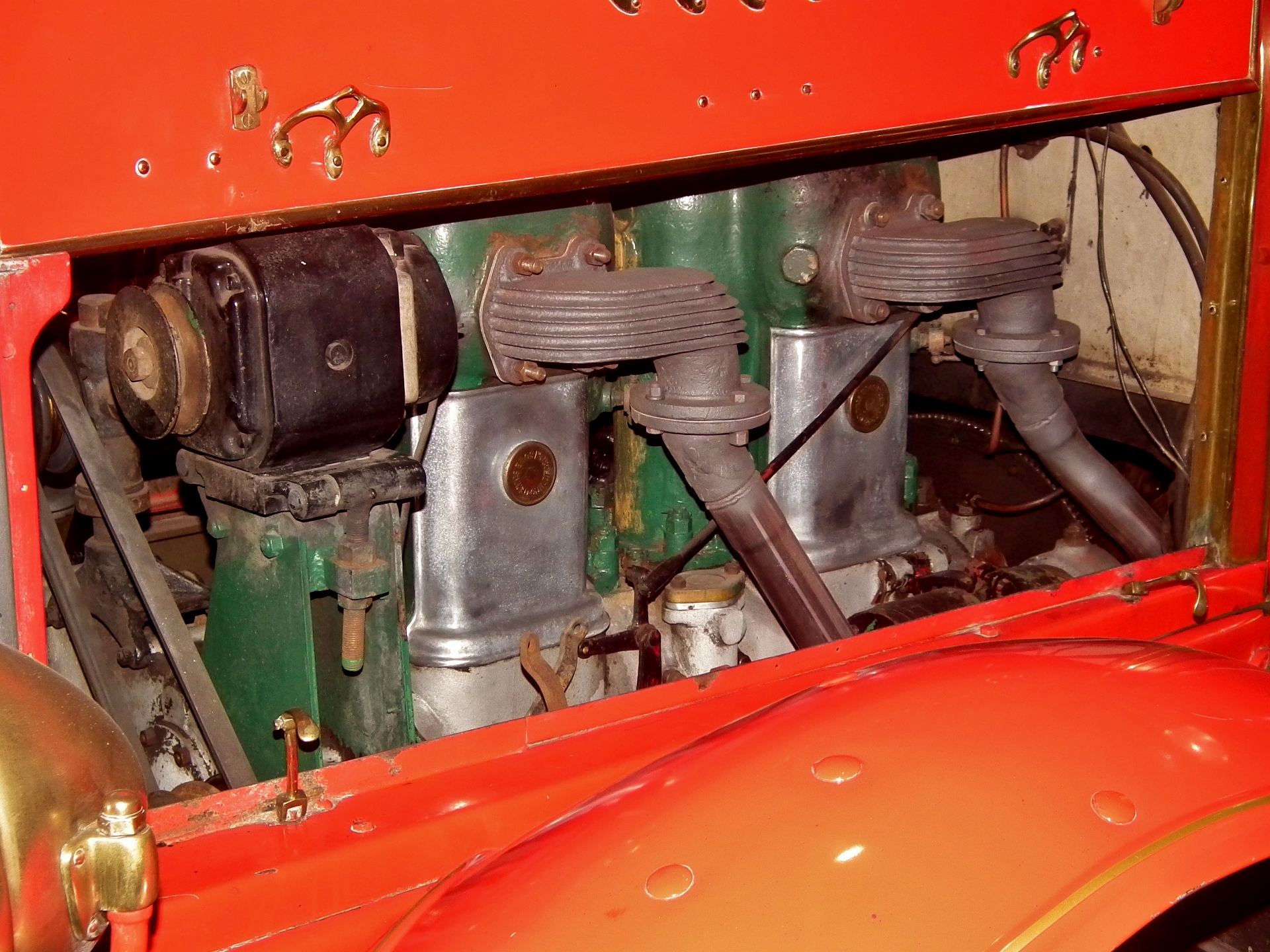
1929 near side (exhaust)

White and Poppe Limited was a proprietary engine building and gearbox manufacturing business established in Coventry in 1899 by Alfred James White (1870-) and Norwegian Peter August Poppe (1870-1933). Many early motor vehicle manufacturers bought in their major components so the company supplied up to 15 customers and employed around 350 people by 1914. Market changes reduced the customer-base but Dennis Brothers, always an important customer, took much of their output and purchased the company in 1919.

White and Poppe remained a distinct entity but during the Great Depression Dennis Brothers manufactured engines in their Surrey works and sourced diesel engines elsewhere. Thus the Coventry operation was disposed of by mid 1933.

== Proprietors ==
This business was established in 1899 by Coventry-born Alfred James White (1870-) and Norwegian Peter August Poppe (1870-1933). They had met in Austria at a weapons factory where Poppe was on secondment from his job in Norway with Kongsberg weapons factory. White was the son of a retired watchmaker, supplier of chronometers to The Admiralty and director of White and Poppe customers Swift and Singer. White's family provided most of the capital for this new business and initially White looked after the accounts and called himself general manager. Poppe, an engineer, took charge of design and together they produced precision components for the automotive industry. Though Peter Poppe went to Rover in 1923 and a younger son left before the company closed its doors Alfred White and Poppe's eldest son Erling remained with the business until they had completed the transfer of operations to Guildford.

== History ==
=== "High speed" petrol engines, carburettors, gearboxes, clutches . . . ===
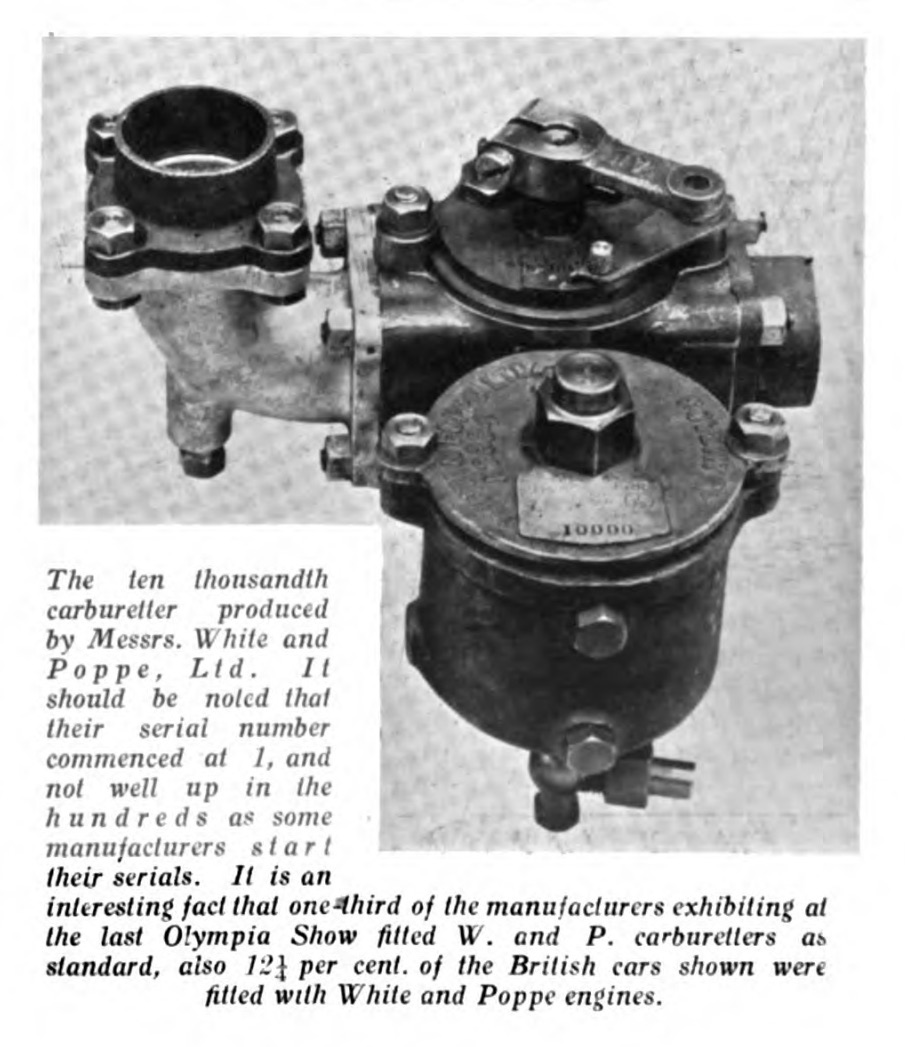
carburetter 1910

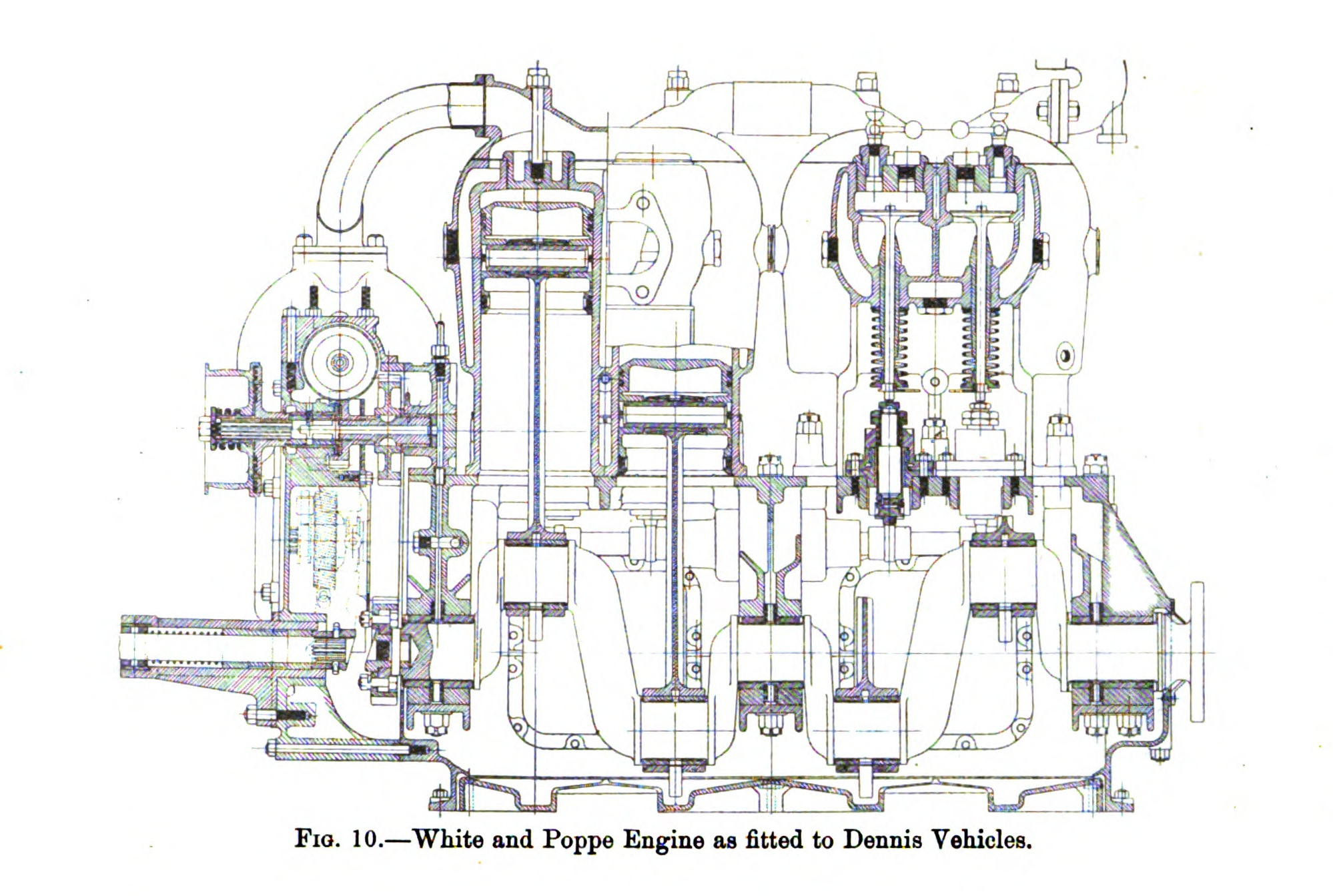
1916 engine for Dennis Brothers

White's partner, Peter August Poppe was designer and chief engineer. He and White and Poppe Limited jointly held many patents for inventions made by him.

Prior to World War I they served the booming motor industry with their engines in such high demand that at the 1906 British International Motor Exhibition 15 different firms displayed automobiles with White and Poppe engines.

By 1910 the White and Poppe carburettor was used by a large proportion of engine builders for motor boats, motorcars and aero engines. A variable jet provided a constant mixture. The petrol jet orifice and the air supply (throttle opening) were designed to cover the whole range of speeds.

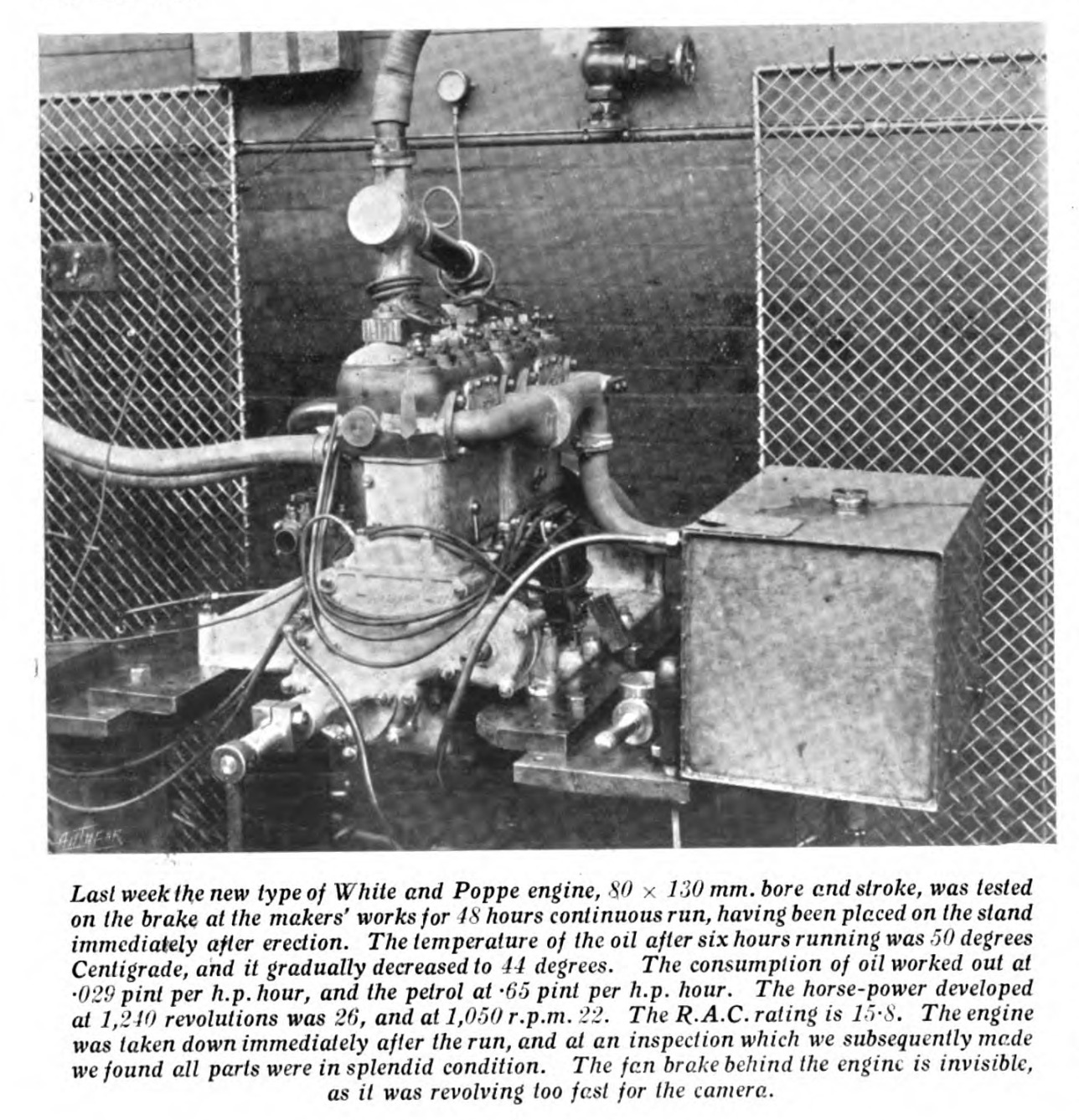
the new 2.6-litre engine

In August 1910 Autocar had noted that at the previous Olympia Motor Show one-third of the manufacturers exhibiting fitted White and Poppe carburettors as standard. In addition 12.25 per cent of the British cars shown were fitted with White and Poppe engines.

"High speed" petrol engines

The White and Poppe stand at the 1910 Olympia Motor Show was centred on their new 2.6-litre 16 hp (tax rating) four-cylinder engine. In operation it developed 24 hp when running at its normal speed of 1,150 revolutions per minute though of course the speed could be pushed up higher. Besides this engine there were ten other types of White and Poppe engine ranging from 4 hp (tax rating) single cylinder to a 130 hp (tax rating) six-cylinder engine.

The Autocar noted that the carburettors had performed so very well in the last competition season there were only one or two minor modifications over the past 12 months.

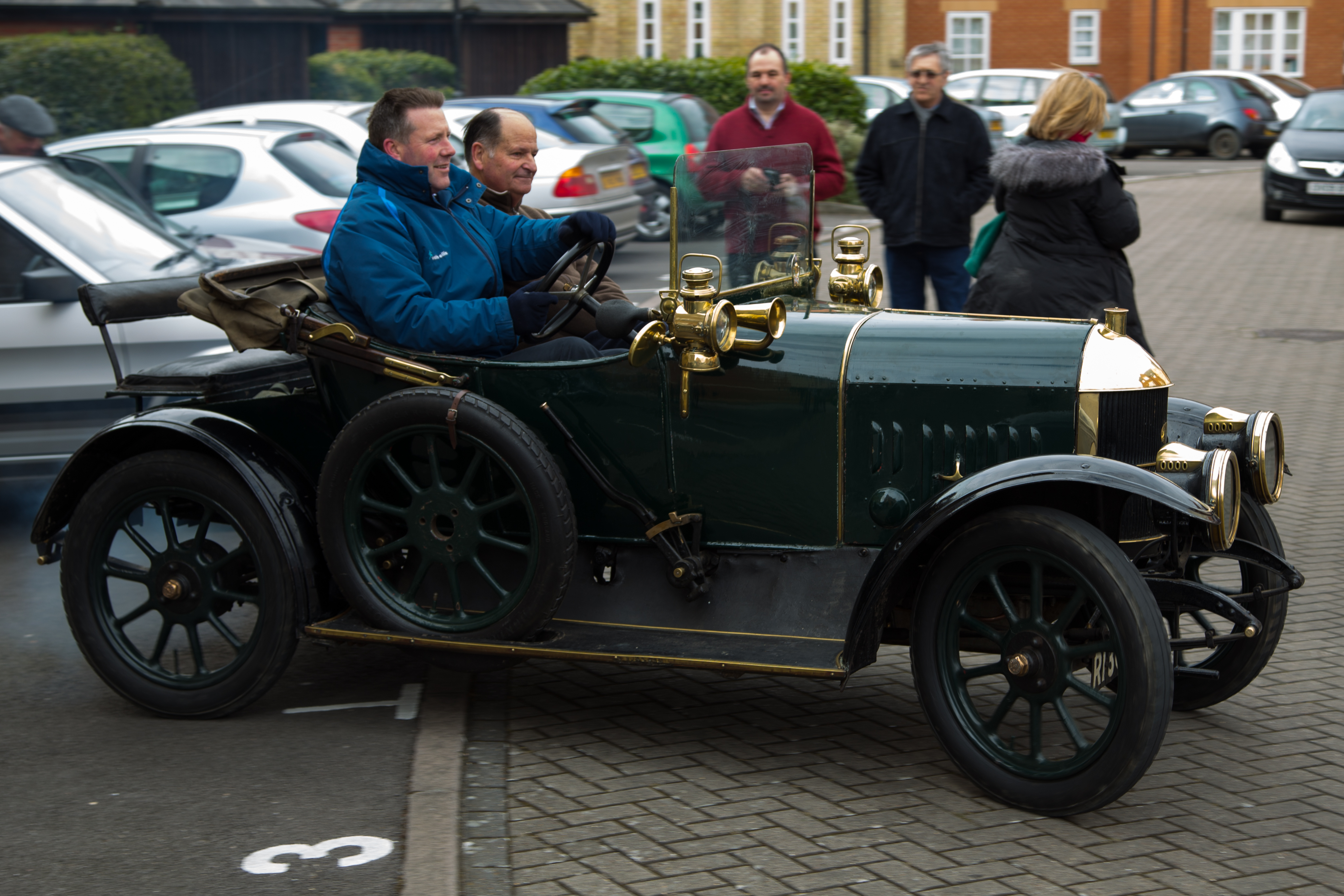
1913 Morris Oxford de luxe

The first Morris Oxford used a White and Poppe engine, carburettor, clutch and gearbox.

=== Dennis Brothers customers ===
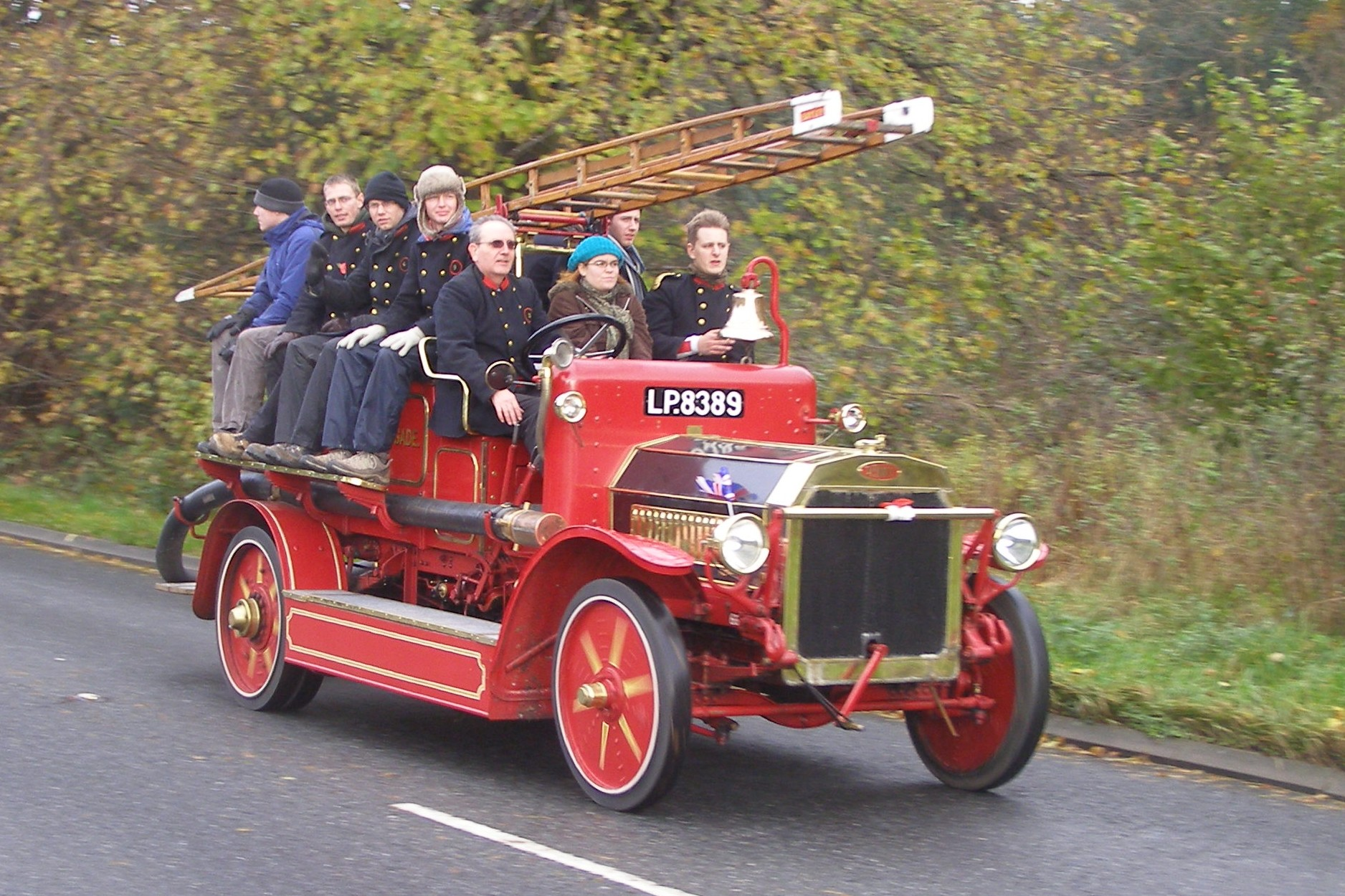
1916 Dennis N-type

W & P made high speed petrol engines for many motor manufacturers but most of their large engines were for Dennis Brothers Limited who became their largest customer. By the outbreak of war some kind of fusion of interests was being considered by the two boards.

=== Fuses, filling shells, aeroplane wings ===
During the war, in addition to the engines for Dennis Brothers and Hallford, (Note: J and E Hall of Dartford Automobile Engineering Works, Dartford, Kent) by the end of the war some 4,000 of them, White and Poppe also made fuses. (Note: a device in a bomb that controls the timing of the explosion) More specifically Fuse 80 bodies and 18pdr shell sockets, rings, caps and base plugs. White and Poppe also managed the Ministry of Munitions No.10 (later 21) National Shell Filling & Fuse factory, part of which was switched at the end of 1916 from fuses to making aeroplane wings. By November 1918 they employed 13,500 people.

Discussions resumed after the war and in April 1919 Dennis Brothers shareholders were asked to consent to the issue of new capital for Dennis Brothers to acquire W & P Later that year White and Poppe became a Dennis Brothers subsidiary but maintained its separate identity. The extent of the fuse-making business was such that there were severe difficulties in winding it up.

=== Dennis Brothers owners ===
Both Poppe and White were made directors of Dennis Brothers. In the recession of 1920 Poppe and another director were sent to USA to investigate their most modern manufacturing methods. At the end of 1921 the shareholders were told the Coventry factory had not been adequately employed and there was a search for new type of work away from motor transport.

As late as 1923, governments, British and foreign, continued to hold large war-surplus fleets of motor transport vehicles still dampening demand for Dennis commercial vehicles and demand for White & Poppe engines. The parent company developed a new multi stage turbine pump and turned to motor lawnmowers as well. By the end of 1923 the possibility of manufacture of London omnibuses had arisen. Poppe designed a new car but it was decided against putting it into production. He remained a director of Dennis Brothers until he resigned in 1923 though he continued the link as a consultant to Dennis Brothers. The Rover Company, their Clegg being obsolete, bought Peter Poppe and his completed car design making him their chief engineer and putting his car design into production as their Rover 14/45.

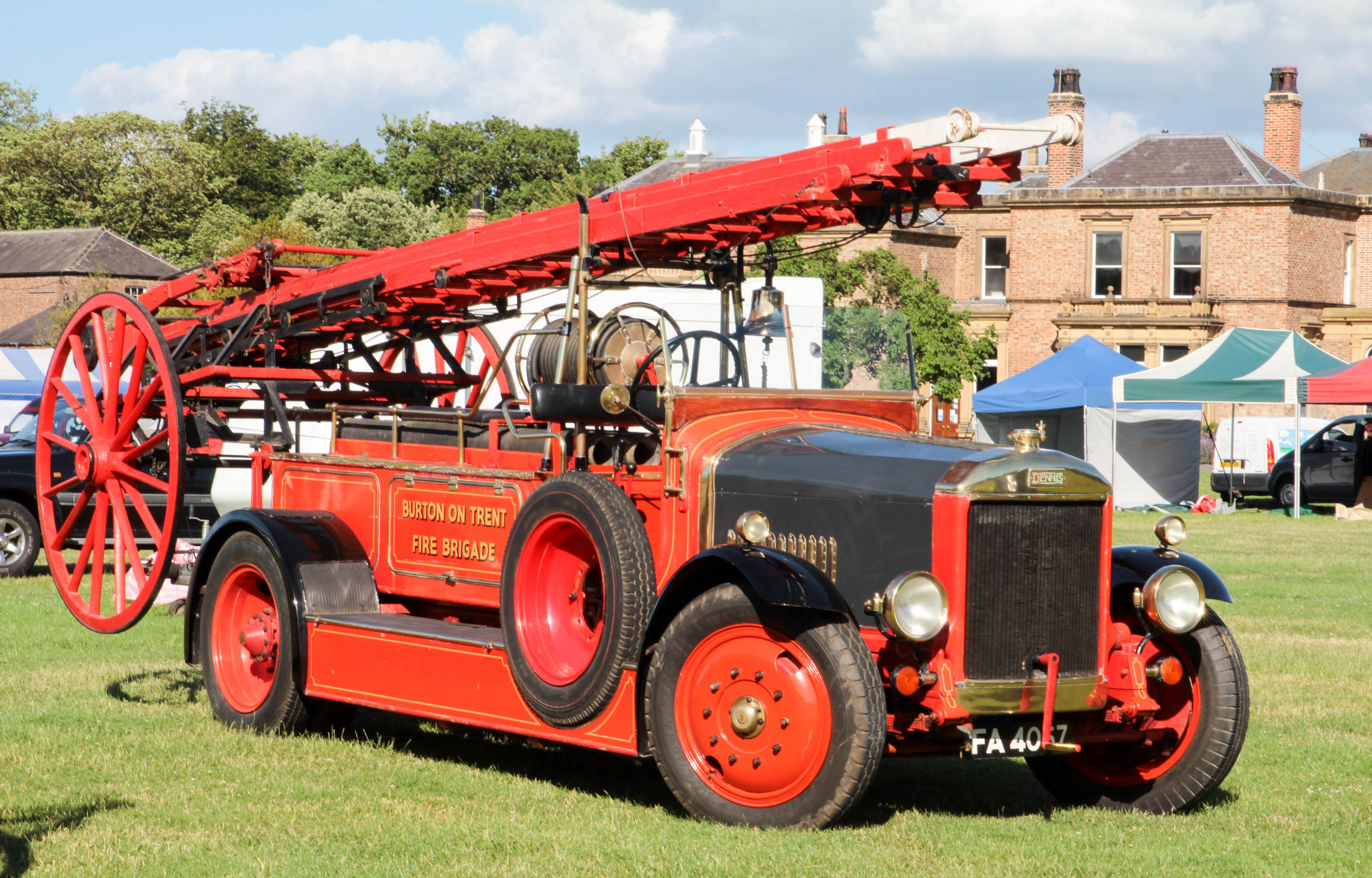
Low Load Dennis fitted with the 60/70HP White and Poppe 'T' head 4 cylinder side valve engine 1930

Alfred White remained in charge of the White and Poppe Coventry operation. By the end of 1924 the stock of war surplus commercial vehicles ceased to be a factor and the group's export sales were at an all-time record. The following year group profits trebled and the Guildford extensions paused in 1920 were resumed but the chairman made no other comment than confirming the wisdom of Dennis Brothers' purchase of White and Poppe. The extraordinary prosperity of Dennis Brothers' core business was demonstrated the next year when instead of issuing yet more bonus shares to shareholders they repaid £250,000 capital to their shareholders because the company held too much cash (£467,000 at balance date) for its own requirements. The White and Poppe operation was self-financing and managed to keep pace with the expansion at Guildford. A new engine was brought to market during 1926 and proved "an unqualified success . . . with large numbers of satisfied users". During the 1920s the rapid increase in turnover and profits was not due to increased prices but to higher sales volume. However White and Poppe's large factory was not yet at full capacity. Their principal product remained internal combustion engines.

==== Patented pivoted rocker gear ====
During 1929 new 6-cylinder engines were introduced. Experience had suggested operators would prefer the cheaper to buy and to maintain 4-cylinder engines. The new 6-cylinder engines were bending to the current fashion. A very valuable invention was patented which allowed the lifting of cylinder heads, decarbonising and valve grinding without dismantling the overhead camshaft. At the Annual General Meeting the chairman reported he had been asked to comment on the use of the crude oil engine and the chairman could "only assure him that we are fully alive to the possibilities".

=== Depression ===
A year later the chairman reported domestic sales remained constant but export sales had fallen considerably. A new six-cylinder Diesel engine had been designed and would shortly go under test. It would not be marketed until its performance equalled a petrol engine and to his knowledge no diesel engine did that at that time. Peter's son Erling Poppe (1898-1970) was now works manager at White and Poppe, Alfred White remained managing director.

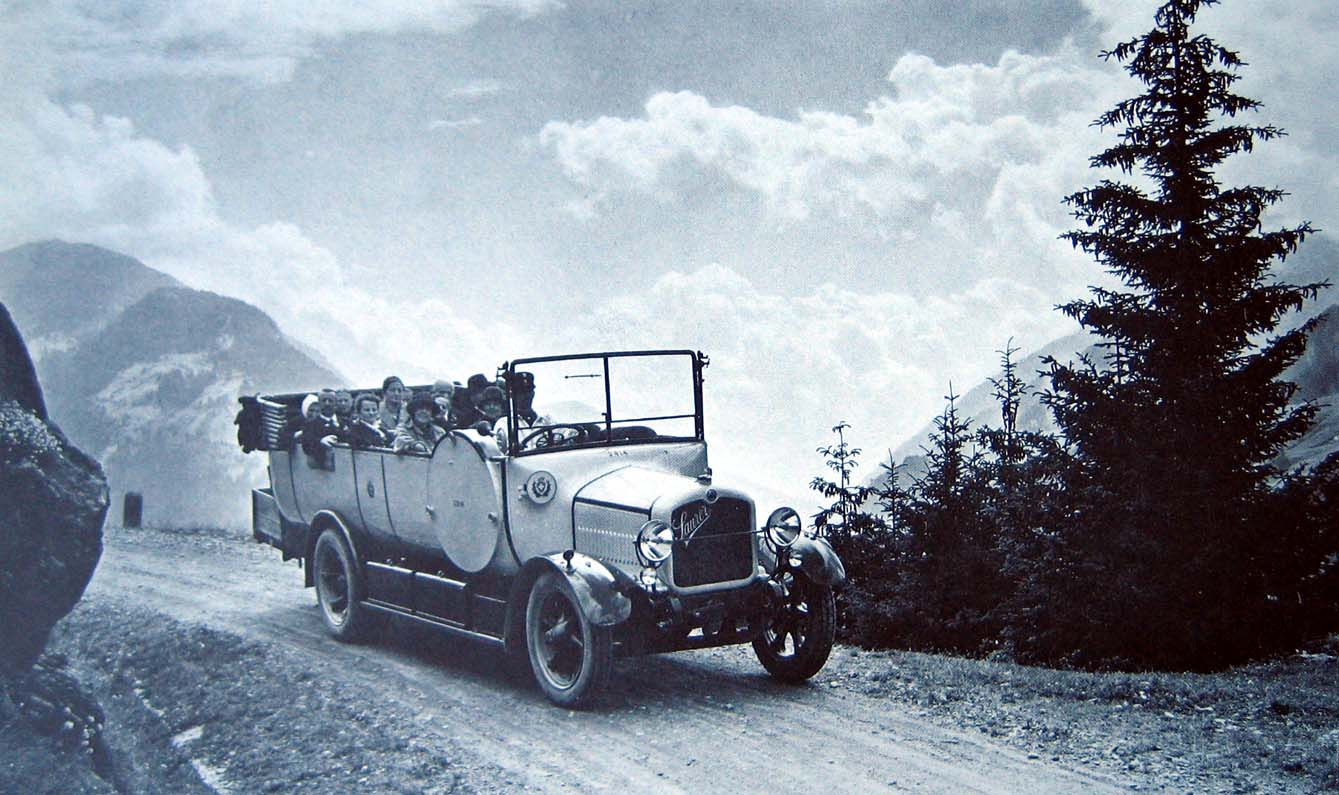
Saurer Alpine car 1930

By the end of 1931 "a number" of crude oil (Diesel) engines were out on test fitted to heavy goods vehicles. The following year group profits fell by 41 per cent though substantial reserves allowed the dividend to be maintained. The chairman announced that in view of the proliferation of new models and their shorter life over which to recover their design development and production costs together with the potential saving in transport costs it had been decided to gradually remove the manufacture of engines from Coventry to Guildford. A new building for the purpose was being completed in Guildford and the change would be complete within twelve months.

A few months later it was announced that Dennis would fit diesel engines made by Armstrong-Saurer Commercial Vehicles of Newcastle upon Tyne, Swiss Saurer products made under licence by Armstrong Whitworth. Dennis would have sole rights for the fitting of these products to passenger vehicles.

White and Poppe ceased operations on 28 March 1933. Required plant and machinery of a combined weight of more than 2000 tons was moved unpacked from Coventry to Guildford by road. Each machine was picked up from its old position and deposited in its new position at Guildford under the guidance of Erling Poppe at Guildford. This unpacked move of plant was reported as widely as possible because Dennis Brothers wanted it to be "a testimonial to the efficiency of road transport".

== Liquidation ==
Dennis Brothers voluntarily liquidated White and Poppe, i.e. turned their assets into cash, on 28 March 1933. In the absence of any buyer they took ownership of the premises and eventually sold the Holbrook Lane Foleshill Coventry premises and plant and machinery not required in Guildford in May 1933. Much of the factory was taken over by SS Cars Ltd which later changed its name to Jaguar Cars Limited.

== Some automobiles with White and Poppe engines ==
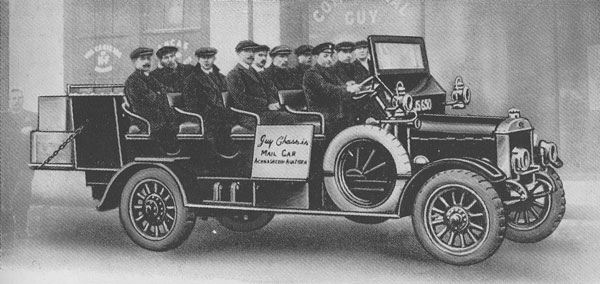
1914 Guy Motors —W&P 4-cylinder side valve engine, clutch and gearbox

- Academy
- Arno
- Calcott
- Calthorpe
- Climax
- Clyde
- Globe
- Guy Motors
- Heron
- Horbick
- Horley
- Morris
- Quadrant
- Rothwell
- Siddeley-Deasy
- Singer
- Swift
- Thrige
- West
- Withers

== Motorcycle engines ==
As well as a limited number of motorcycles under their own name, White and Poppe supplied engines to:

- Ariel motorcycles
- Premier Motorcycles

== Commercial vehicle engines ==
- Dennis

== See also ==
- Alexander Dennis
- Dennis Specialist Vehicles
