= Cluley =

British automobile manufactured between 1921 and 1928

The Cluley was a British automobile manufactured between 1921 and 1928 by Clarke, Cluley & Co based in Coventry.

Clarke Cluley began as a general engineering business in 1890 by Ernest Clarke and Charles J. Cluley, and went on to specialize in textile machinery. In 1897 the company started making bicycles under the Globe brand. In the early years of the twentieth century they seem to have made a few three-wheel cars and motorcycles but production stopped with the outbreak of World War I when the factory turned to munitions work.

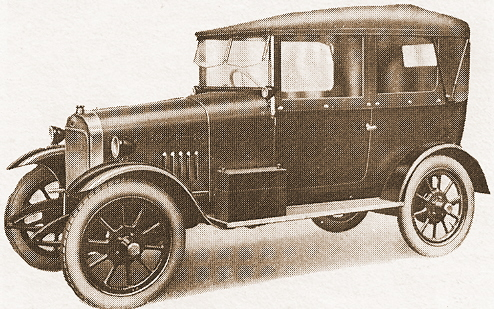
1924 Cluley 10/20

In 1921 they made their first four-wheel car, the 10 or 10/20, powered by a water-cooled 1328 cc side valve engine which they built themselves. The car is thought to have been designed by Arthur Alderson who also worked for Calcott and Lea Francis. Drive was to the rear axle through a cone clutch and three speed gearbox. The car with open tourer coachwork cost £525 in 1921 falling to £225 in 1926. The last cars of this type were produced in 1926 and possibly as many as 2000 were made. In 1922 it was joined by the 11.9 with a longer wheelbase and 1645 cc engine. A six-cylinder model, the 16/40, was listed in 1923 but probably never went into production.

A new model, the 14/30, came in 1927 with a 1944 cc engine by Cluley and a four-speed gearbox; this was followed by the 14/50 with a 2120 cc Meadows engine. Very few of these cars are thought to have been made and production of all vehicles stopped in 1928.

The company returned to the manufacture of textile machinery. Subcontract work for Rolls-Royce on aero engines kept them in business but the factory was destroyed in an air raid during World War II. The company continued production at premises in nearby Kenilworth but closed in 1987.

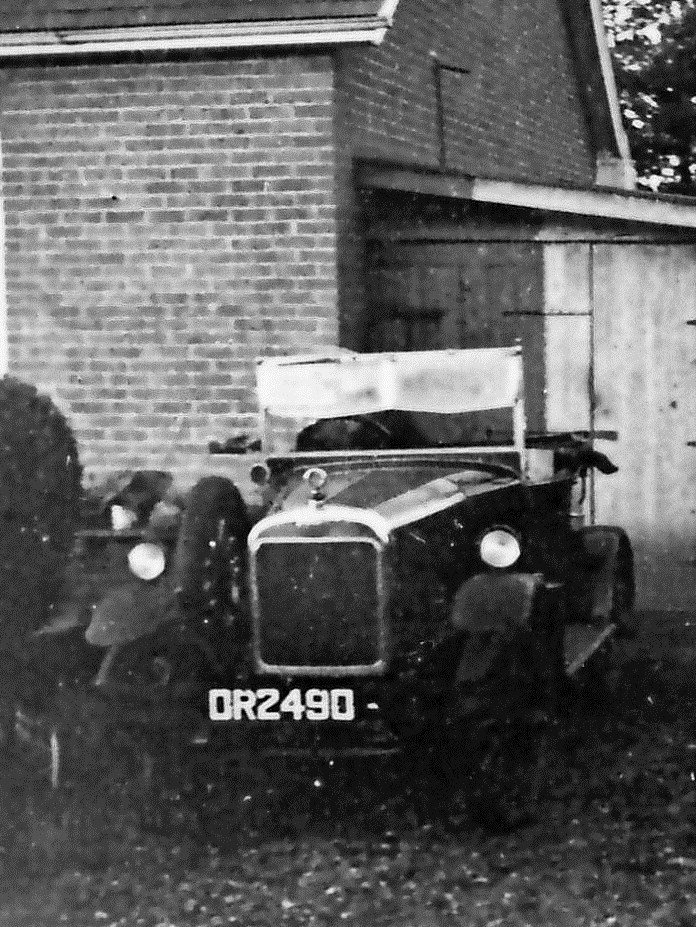
Cluley 10/20 open tourer

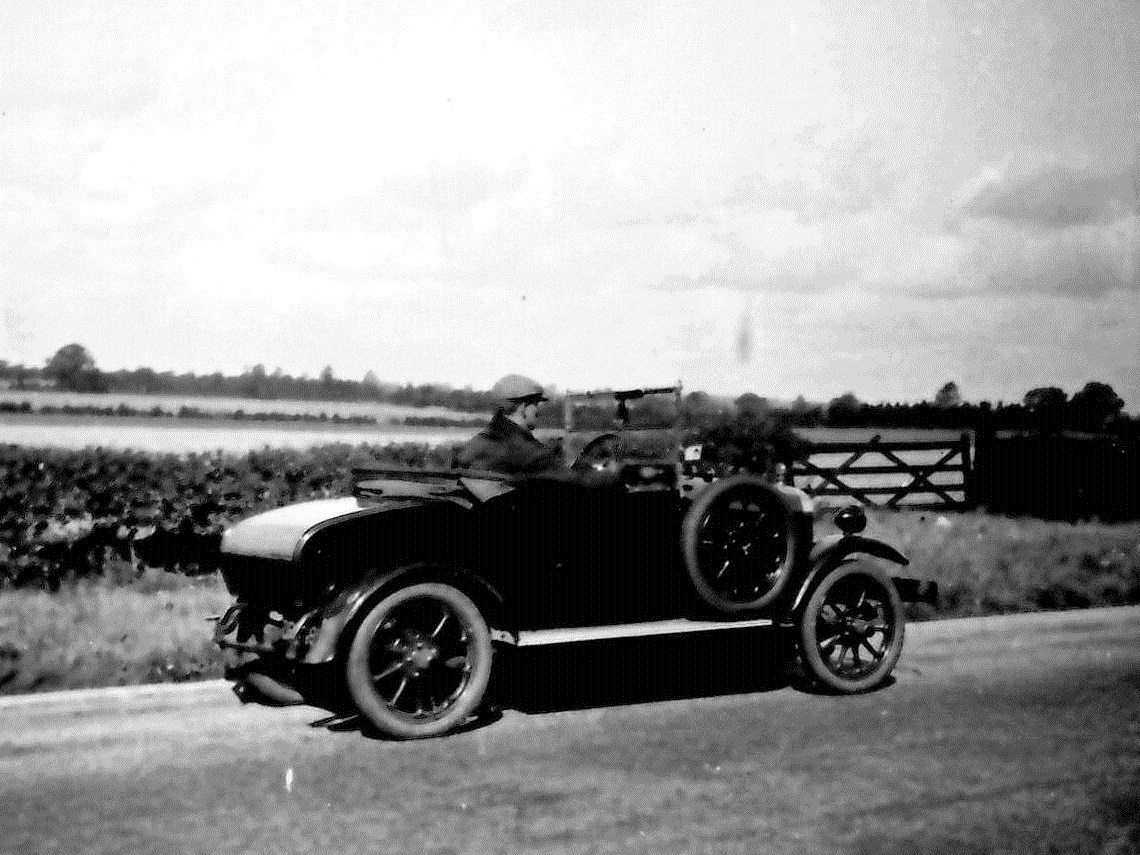
Cluley 10/20 open tourer

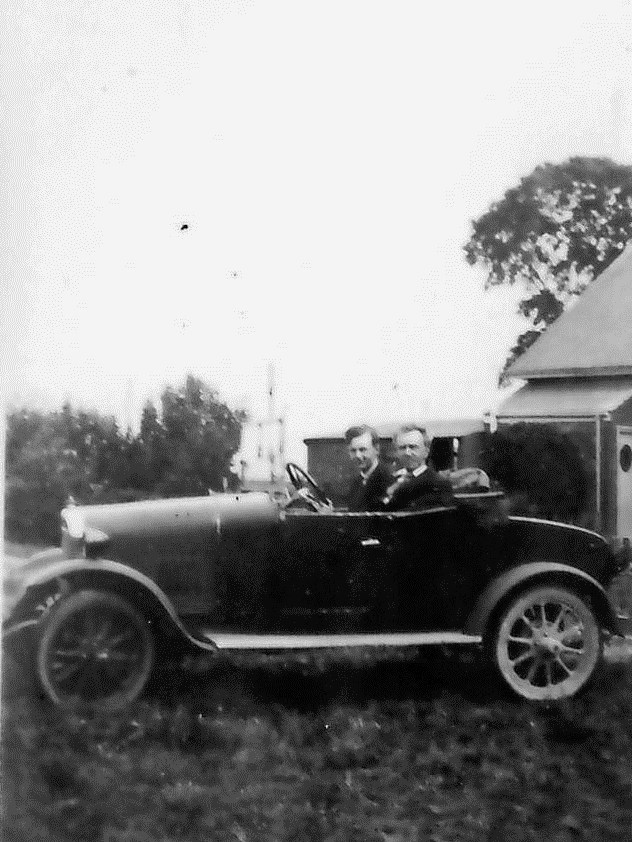
Cluley 10/20 open tourer

== Models ==
Model	Years	Cylinders	Capacity	Wheelbase	Length
10/20	1921–1926	four	1328 cc	96 in (2,438 mm)	135 in (3,429 mm)
11.9	1922	four	1645 cc	108 in (2,743 mm)	156 in (3,962 mm)
16/40	1923	six	1645 cc	116 in (2,946 mm)	162 in (4,115 mm)
10/20	1925	four	1460 cc	111 in (2,819 mm)	159 in (4,039 mm)
14/30	1927	four	1944 cc	111 in (2,819 mm)	159 in (4,039 mm)
14/50	1928	four	2120 cc	111 in (2,819 mm)	159 in (4,039 mm)
