= Kaye Don =

Irish world record breaking car and speedboat racer

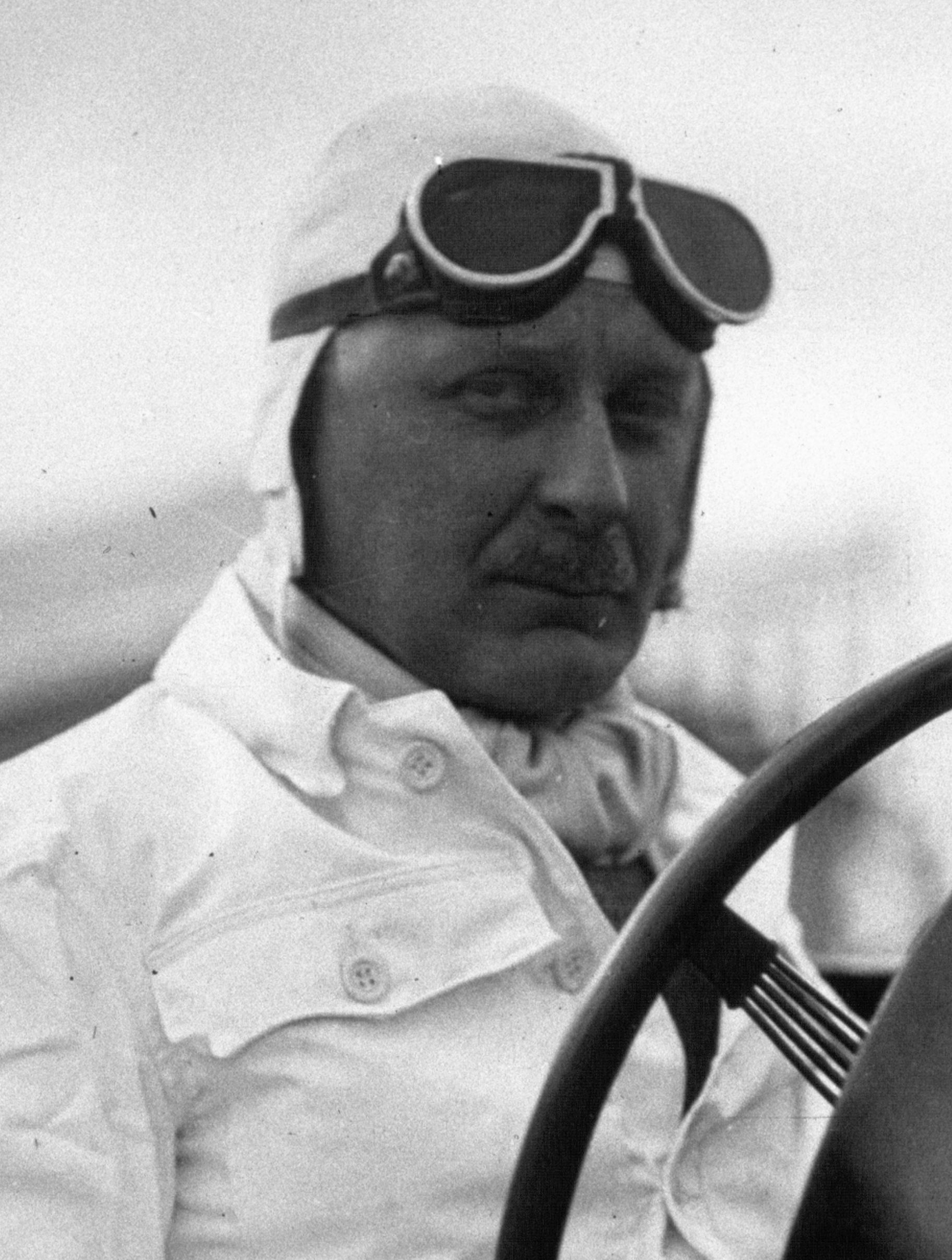
- Kaye Don in 1933
- Born: Kaye Ernest Donsky; 10 April 1891; Dublin, Ireland
- Died: 29 August 1981 (aged 90); Chobham, Surrey, England
- Occupation: Motor racer
- Known for: 1930 Speedboat World Record

Kaye Ernest Donsky (10 April 1891 – 29 August 1981), better known by his nom de course Kaye Don, was an Irish world record breaking car and speedboat racer. He became a motorcycle dealer on his retirement from road racing and set up Ambassador Motorcycles.

== Early life ==
Kaye Ernest Donsky was born in Dublin on 10 April 1891. He was of Polish ancestry and shortened his name to Don. He was brought up in Kingston-upon-Thames and was an RFC pilot during the First World War.

== Early racing career ==
Kaye Don began his career as a motorcycle racer but soon switched to cars and won the inaugural 1928 Ards-Belfast circuit, Northern Ireland, Tourist Trophy with a Lea-Francis. Between 1926 and 1928 Kaye raced a 1921 Grand Prix Sunbeam at Brooklands which was an ex-Malcolm Campbell 'Blue Bird' and extensively contributed to what W Boddy described as "the best run of success by any Brooklands car in such a period".

In 1928 he had three ex-works Sunbeam cars which he named "Cub", "Tiger" and "Tigress". Don regularly raced at Brooklands and driving a Sunbeam on 22 September 1928 he set an outer circuit lap flying start record of 131.76 miles per hour (212.05 km/h) and increased this to 134.24 miles per hour (216.04 km/h) on 5 August 1929. Driving a Wolseley Viper at Brooklands Don achieved many class records between 1928 and 1930. Driving the V-12 Sunbeam Tigress at Brooklands on 9 June 1930, Kaye set a new Outer Circuit lap record of 137.58 miles per hour (221.41 km/h).

In 1929 he wagered sister motorcyclists Betty and Nancy Debenham that they couldn't complete a 2,000 mile tour without spending any of their own money. They succeeded in very snowy conditions and with lots of press coverage.

In a victory speech to the Empire Club of Canada in 1931, when he was the holder of land and water world speed records, Kaye Don made a classic understatement: "One or two experiences that I have had have been somewhat thrilling".

== Silver Bullet ==
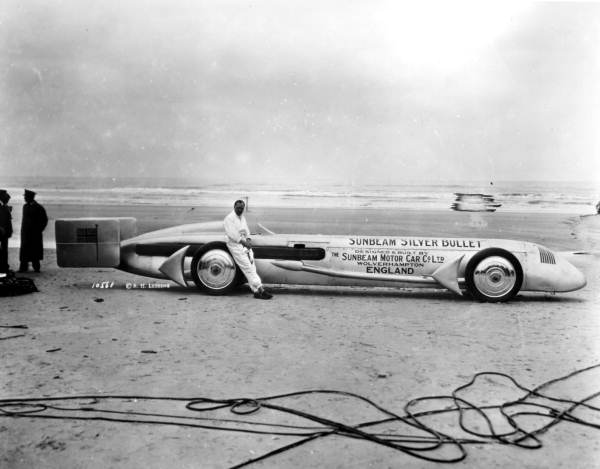
The Sunbeam Silver Bullet

The Sunbeam Silver Bullet was the last attempt on the land speed record by the Sunbeam Motor Car Company of Wolverhampton. It was built in 1929 for Kaye Don. Powered by two Sunbeam supercharged aircraft engines of 24 litres each, it looked impressive but failed to achieve any records.

== Speedboat world record ==
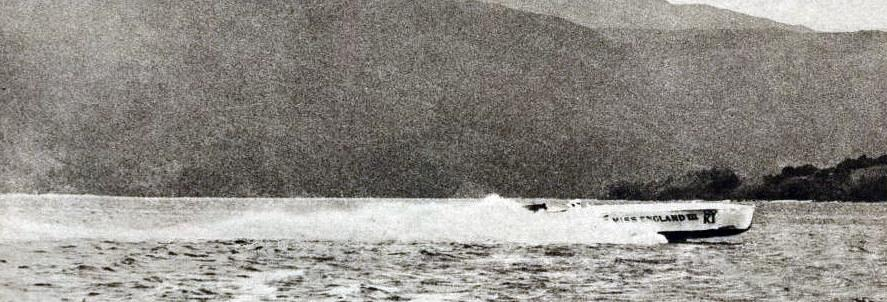
On 18 July 1932, Kaye attracted 20,000 spectators when setting a water world speed record of 119.81 mph on Loch Lomond, using Miss England III.

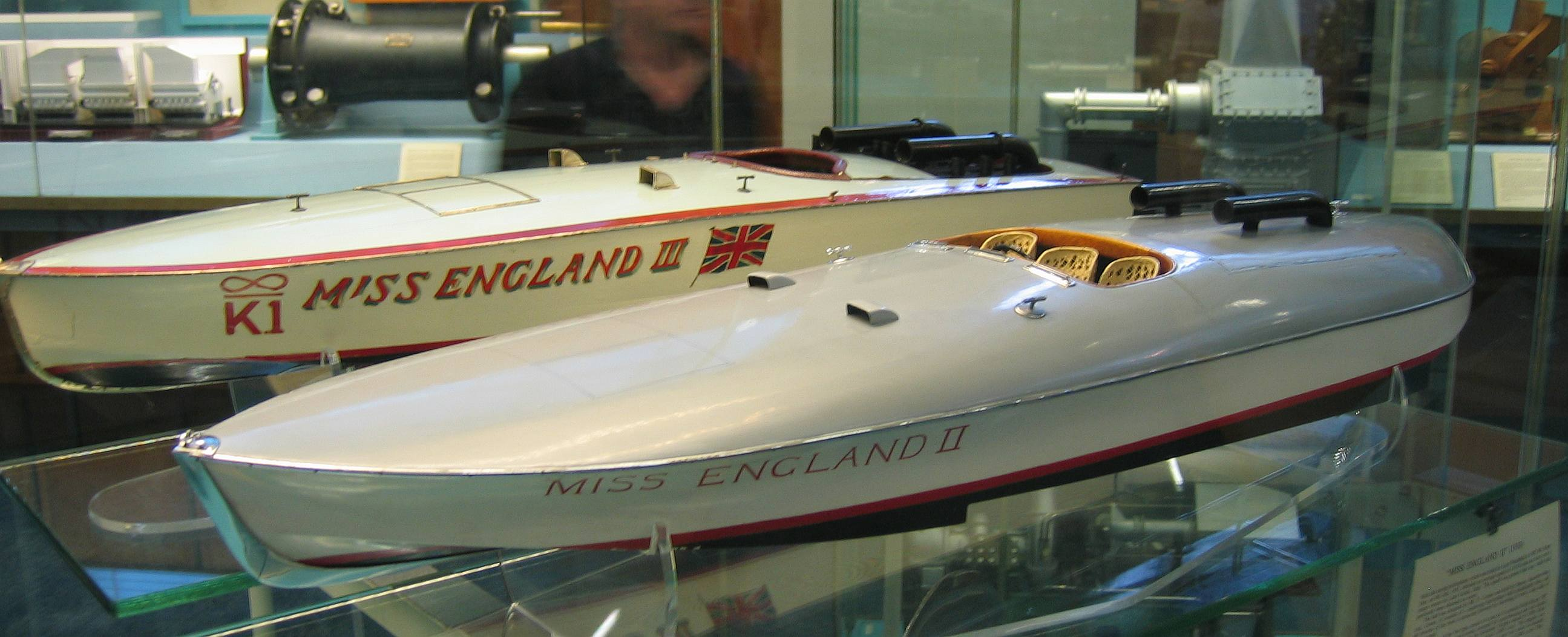
Model of Miss England II at the Science Museum, London

In 1931 Don was selected to compete in the Harmsworth Trophy Race on the Detroit River. Billed as a match between the Wood brothers, Gar (in the new Miss America IX) and George (in last year's Miss America VIII), and the "Englishman" Kaye Don, driving Lord Wakefield's powerboat Miss England II. While preparing for the race, Gar Wood became the first man to exceed 100 mph (160 km/h) on water but three days later, Kaye Don became a new water speed world record holder by beating Wood by just 1.25 mph (2.01 km/h). Before an estimated crowd of over a million spectators, Don also won the first heat of the race. Miss America IX had suffered hull damage from pounding through Miss England's wake. Despite working overnight, she was barely ready the next day and Wood requested a delay to allow repairs to be completed, something he'd previously been known to concede to. Don stuck to the rules though, a matter which still rankles with some today. Miss America IX made it to the second heat, but only by Wood racing flat-out to the start line, a mistake that cost him dearly later on. During another close race, Wood was leading Don when Miss England II suddenly flipped over rounding one of the turns, without injury to Don and his co-driver. Gar Wood finished the race first, but both he and Don were disqualified because they had jumped the starter's gun by seven seconds. George Wood completed the final race to win the trophy.

== Isle of Man accident ==
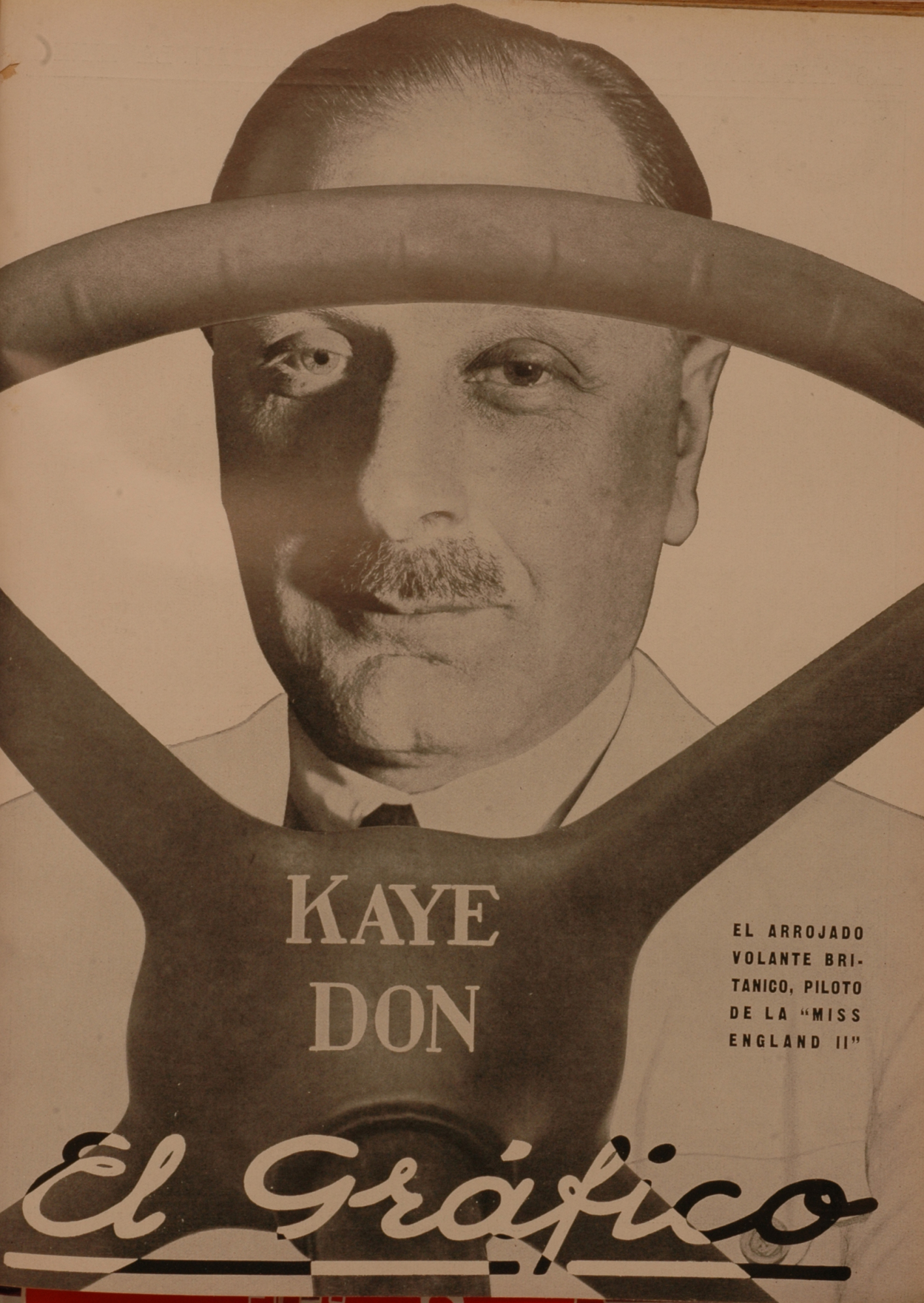
Kaye Don in 1931

On Monday 28 May 1934, Don was preparing to race an MG Magnette on public roads on the Isle of Man. He was involved in an incident which caused the death of Francis Tayler, an MG employee. After testing in the morning, Don had complained of poor steering, though this was disputed by MG. Late in the evening, as Don prepared to play bridge with his wife and race driver H.C. Hamilton, Tayler informed him that the car had been worked on and tested. Kaye Don took the car out for a further test, with Francis Tayler as passenger. This took place at 10pm. The car had no lights, number plates or insurance, yet it was driven on open public roads. Don claimed that the light was adequate, indeed, lighting-up time was 10:25 pm. As he rounded a bend, the MG was in glancing collision with a hackney carriage driven by Mr Ralph Cain, who had five passengers. Nobody was hurt in the cab, but the MG lost a wheel and overturned. Both occupants were injured, being admitted to hospital at 10:45 pm. Tayler died at 5:15 am the following morning.

By a majority of seven to four, the Coroner's Court found that Tayler's death was due to negligence on the part of Kaye Don who was, then, sent for trial on a charge of manslaughter. The trial opened on 14 July, in the traditional Isle of Man Tynwald court. Sammy Davis, editor of Autocar, defended Don on the grounds that a racing mechanic knew the risks. The evidence was presented but Don was found guilty and sentenced to four months in prison by Deemster Farrant.

He appealed on the grounds that Francis Tayler had said something to Kaye Don's detriment before he died and that his comments had become public and had prejudiced his trial. There were 16 grounds for appeal, but all were rejected and the appeal was dismissed on 29 September by Sir Harold Derbyshire (Judge of Appeal) and R. K. Chappell (Acting Deemster). In jail he was treated as a privileged prisoner and continued to receive medical treatment. He was released on 10 December on medical grounds.

== Ambassador Motorcycles ==
In the 1940s Don established and developed Ambassador Motorcycles. The company produced many different models until it was taken over by DMW in 1962 and Kaye Don retired.

== Personal life ==
He was married twice. His first marriage was in 1932, when aged 41 he married Eileen the daughter of Leonard F. Martin of New York. They lived in Weybridge, Surrey and had two sons and one daughter. This marriage was later dissolved. In 1954, aged 64, he married Valerie Evelyn and they lived near Chobham, Surrey.

== Death ==
Kaye Don died in Chobham Surrey in 1981 aged 90.

In memory of his achievements at Brooklands race track, the area has a street named after Kaye Don in the borough of Elmbridge.
