= ČAS (car) =

Czech vehicle manufacturer

Česká automobilová společnost pro obchod a montáž motorových vozidel
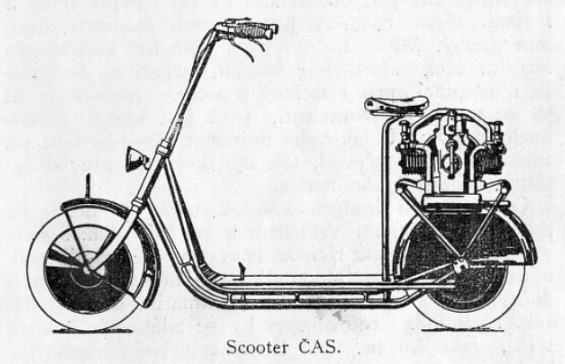
- A picture of a ČAS Scooter from 1920
- Industry: Automotive, Motorcycles
- Founded: 1920
- Founder: The Rechziegel brothers
- Defunct: 1924
- Headquarters: Prague, Czech Republic
- Products: Automobiles, Motorcycles

Česká automobilová společnost pro obchod a montáž motorových vozidel, formerly Bratři Rechzieglovi, was a Czech manufacturer of motorcycles and automobiles.

== History ==
Based in Prague, the company began producing motorcycles in 1920 and later automobiles in 1921 under the brand name ČAS. Production ended around 1924.

== Vehicles ==
=== Motorcycles ===
They produced a two-cylinder boxer engine with either a 129cc or 174cc engine. They later made a single-cylinder engine.

=== Automobile ===
A year later, they produced a small four-wheeled two-seater automobiles. Powered by a single-cylinder two-stroke engine with a displacement choice of 250cc or 350cc. According to other sources, they used a 689cc air-cooled two-cylinder engine from Coventry-Victor as well as a two-cylinder engines from Walter in later models.

== Literature ==
- Harald H. Linz, Halwart Schrader: Die Internationale Automobil-Enzyklopädie. United Soft Media Verlag, Munich 2008, ISBN 978-3-8032-9876-8. (German)
- George Nicholas Georgano (Editor-in-chief.): The Beaulieu Encyclopedia of the Automobile. Band 2: P–Z. Fitzroy Dearborn Publishers, Chicago 2001, ISBN 1-57958-293-1. (English).
