= Calthorpe cars =

English vehicle manufacturer

Calthorpe Motor Company
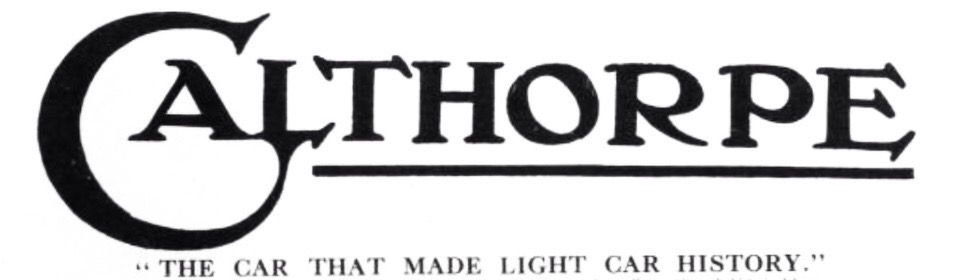
- Type: Private
- Industry: Automotive
- Founded: 1904; 122 years ago
- Defunct: 1932; 94 years ago
- Headquarters: Bordesley Green, England
- Products: Automobile, motorcycles, bicycles

The Calthorpe Motor Company based in Bordesley Green, Birmingham, England, made a range of cars, motorcycles and bicycles from 1904 to 1932.

== Formation ==
The company had its origins in the 1890s as a Birmingham bicycle maker called Hands and Cake run by George W. Hands. This was renamed the Bard Cycle Manufacturing Company in 1897 changing to the Minstrel Cycle Company in 1901. The Minstrel Cycle Company evolved into the Minstrel and Rea Cycle Company, and it appears the Calthorpe Motor Co Ltd was created at about that time. It was reported that the two companies were operating out of the same premises in Barn Street, Birmingham when a serious fire occurred in June 1905. By 1909 the Calthorpe car works had moved to Cherrywood Road, Bordesley Green, Birmingham. Around November 1912 Calthorpe Motor Co (1912) Ltd was incorporated, with directors The Rt. Hon. Lord Teynham, Wilfrid Hill, Daniel Taylor, George William Hands and Harry Joyce.

== Car production ==
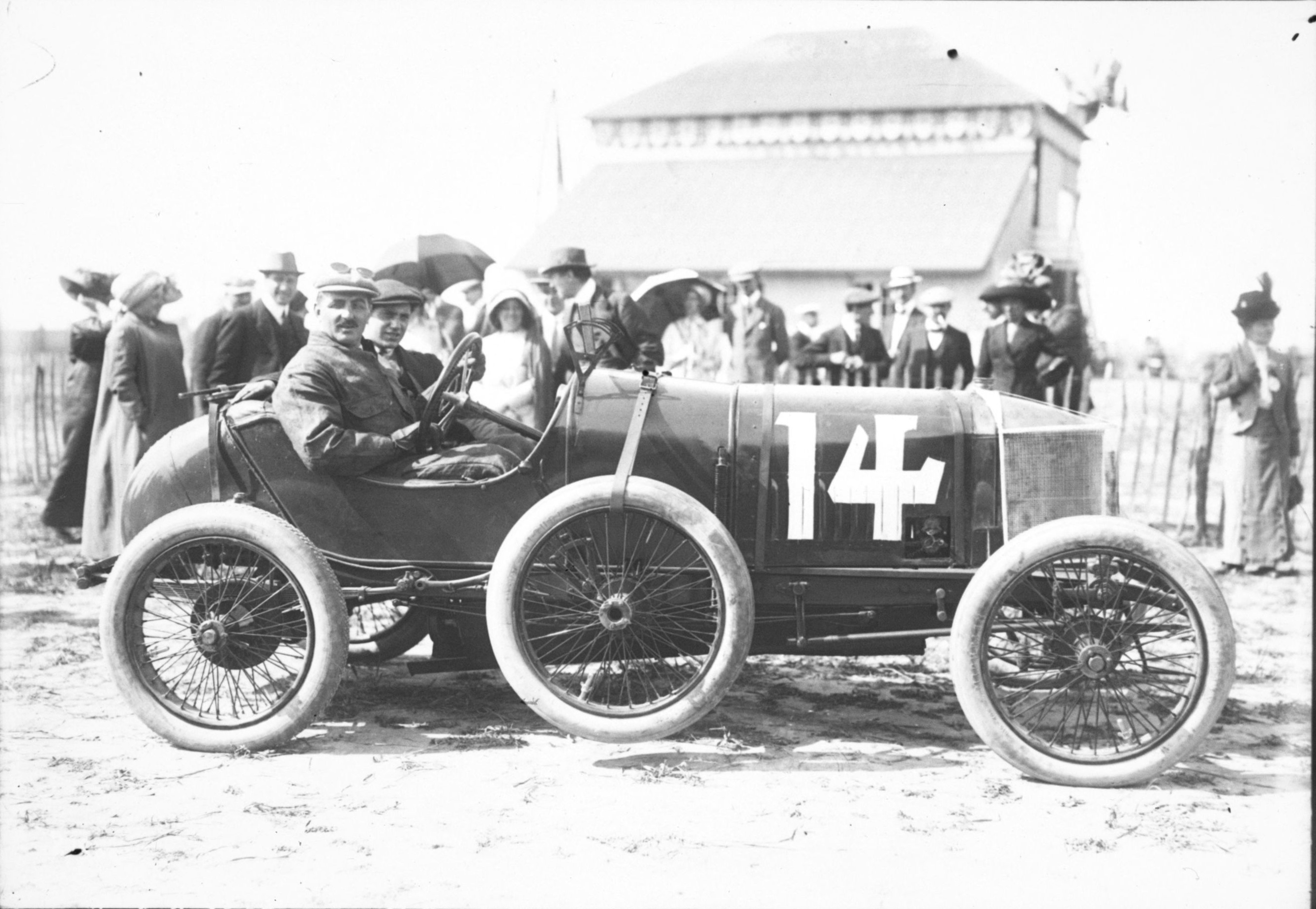
Pierre Garcet in his Calthorpe at the 1912 French Grand Prix in Dieppe

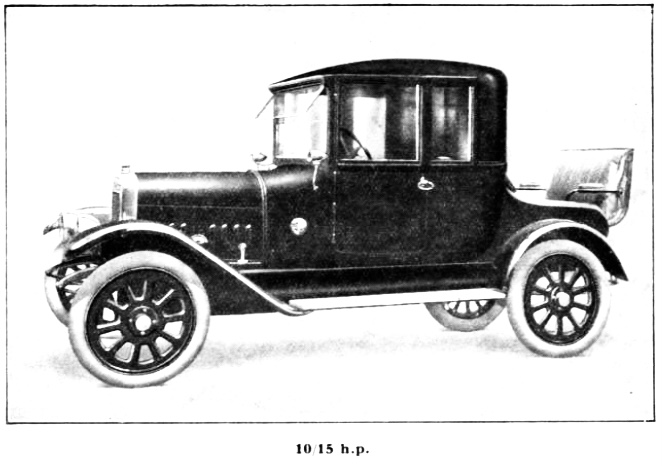
Calthorpe 10-15 hp (1922-1926)

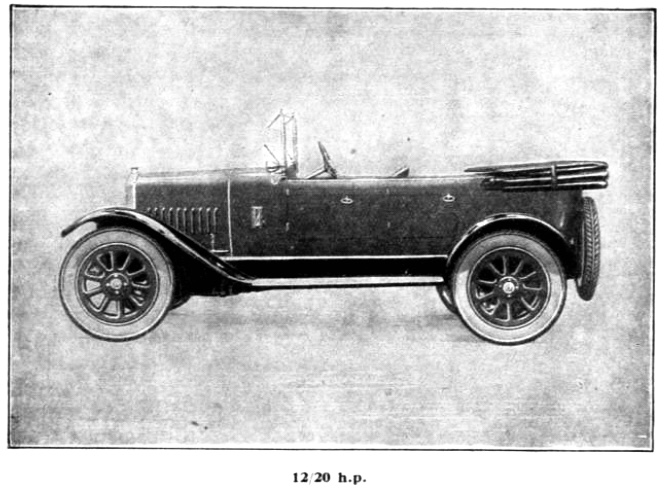
Calthorpe 12-20 hp (1922-1926(1932))

In 1904, the first motor car, a 10 hp four-cylinder model, was announced. Some, or all, of the engines for these early cars were made by Johnson, Hurley and Martin Ltd at their Alpha Works in Coventry until about 1909 (there was a dispute in 1913 over ownership of the engine block casting patterns). In an article about assembling cars from components, it was stated that the 16-20 Calthorpe, launched in 1907, had an Alpha engine. The 16-20 model was launched in summer of 1907, and appeared at the Olympics motor show, where it was described as having a 4-cylinder engine of 93mm bore and 104mm stroke (so 2825cc), with a Hele-Shaw clutch and transmission by live axle. White metal bearings are used in the engine, but ball bearings are to be found in the gearbox and back axle. There is a fifth transverse spring to aid in keeping the body steady when travelling over rough roads. This particular model did very well in reliability trials and other events in 1907 and 1908. At the Olympia show in 1908 it was announced that for the forthcoming season the 16/20 would have an increased stroke from 105mm to 120mm, this appears to coincide with the Calthorpe moving away from the Alpha engines, to another supplier.

Calthorpe briefly made some larger types, but it was in the light car field that they specialised, using proprietary White and Poppe engines. The cars were successfully raced in France in the Coupe de l'Auto series. A small car was announced in 1913 for the 1914 season with the 10 hp Minor, which proved to be a real large car in miniature, with a 3-speed gearbox and shaft drive.

After the war the large cars were dropped, but the Minor re-appeared with a slightly larger engine of 1261 cc. In 1920 a Mr J Mathews was in charge of production, and a target of making 50 cars a week was set. The cars continued to have excellent coachwork made by the Calthorpe subsidiary company of Mulliners (acquired in 1917), who had an adjacent factory. Sporting activity continued with Woolf Barnato, amongst others, racing at Brooklands. George Hands briefly left the company in 1922 to set up his own Hands make of cars in the Calthorpe motorcycle factory in Barn Street, Birmingham but returned in 1924. Whilst away he developed the six-cylinder overhead-camshaft engine that was fitted for a short time to the 12/20. The Hands cars seem to have used Dorman engines.

The days of the high-quality light car were coming to an end by the late 1920s, and sales of the fairly expensive Calthorpe were declining. A receiver had to be appointed in 1924, and the Bordesley Green factory closed, but very limited production kept going for a while. A final fling with the 1925 15/45 six-cylinder 2-litre car was really too late, and sales of the remaining stocks of cars had virtually ceased by 1928.

About 5,000 cars were made in the post-war period; pre-war production is uncertain. Fewer than ten cars are thought to have survived.

== Car models ==
Type	Engine	Year	Notes
Calthorpe 10 hp	1530 cc side-valve two-cylinder water-cooled	1904	87-inch (2,200 mm) wheelbase. Shaft drive.
Calthorpe 16 hp	2383 cc side-valve four-cylinder water-cooled	1905	102-inch (2,600 mm) wheelbase
Calthorpe 12/14	1810 cc side-valve four-cylinder water-cooled	1906–08	102-inch (2,600 mm) wheelbase. Updated 10 hp model
Calthorpe 16/20	(2850) 3261 cc side-valve four-cylinder water-cooled	1907–16	102-inch (2,600 mm) wheelbase. Engine 4-cyl, bore 93mm, stroke increased for 1909 season from 105mm to 120mm
Calthorpe 28/40	4562 cc side-valve four-cylinder water-cooled	1907	117-inch (3,000 mm) wheelbase
Calthorpe 25	4250 cc side-valve four-cylinder water-cooled	1908–10	86-inch (2,200 mm) wheelbase. Engine 4-cyl, bore 102mm, stroke 130mm
Calthorpe 12/14	2297 cc side-valve four-cylinder water-cooled	1909–11	98-inch (2,500 mm) or 102-inch (2,600 mm) wheelbase
Calthorpe 15	3012 cc side-valve four-cylinder water-cooled	1911–13	114-inch (2,900 mm) wheelbase
Calthorpe 20	3817 cc side-valve four-cylinder water-cooled	1911–13	114-inch (2,900 mm) wheelbase
Calthorpe 12/15	1868 or 1924 cc side-valve four-cylinder water-cooled	1912–15	102-inch (2,600 mm) wheelbase
Calthorpe 15	3016 cc side-valve four-cylinder water-cooled	1912–15	114-inch (2,900 mm) wheelbase
Calthorpe 10/12 Minor	1087 cc side-valve four-cylinder water-cooled	1914–15	87-inch (2,200 mm) wheelbase
Calthorpe 10.4	1261 cc side-valve four-cylinder water-cooled	1919	99-inch (2,500 mm) wheelbase
Calthorpe 10/15	1261 cc side-valve four-cylinder water-cooled	1922–26	102-inch (2,600 mm) wheelbase. Three-speed gearbox. two-seater £240 in 1924.
Calthorpe 12/20 I and II	1496 cc side-valve four-cylinder water-cooled	1922–32	86-inch (2,200 mm) wheelbase. Four-speed gearbox. Engine quoted as 30 bhp (22 kW) at 3000 rpm. Detachable cylinder head from 1924. Two-seater £285 in 1924, £295 in 1926. Saloon £425 in 1924, £395 in 1926.
Calthorpe 12/20 III	1991 cc overhead-cam six-cylinder water-cooled		86-inch (2,200 mm) wheelbase. Very few made.
Calthorpe 10/20	1327 cc side-valve four-cylinder water-cooled	1924–31	Updated 10/15. 103-inch (2,600 mm) or 106-inch (2,700 mm) wheelbase. Two- or four-seater £235 in 1924, £215 in 1926. Pressure lubricated engine from 1925.
Calthorpe 15/45	1991 cc overhead-valve six-cylinder water-cooled	1925–28	112-inch (2,800 mm) wheelbase. Four-wheel brakes. Three-speed gearbox. Very few made.
Calthorpe 12/25	1720 cc side-valve four-cylinder water-cooled	1926	86-inch (2,200 mm) wheelbase. Updated 12/20. Pressure lubricated engine.

== Calthorpe motorcycles ==
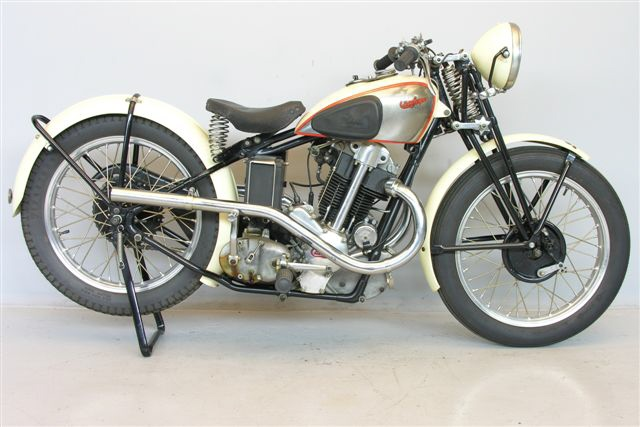
Calthorpe 500 cc M4 Ivory 1936

The Minstrel Cycle Company became the Minstrel & Rea Cycle Company in 1905 and started making motorcycles in 1909. The company name changed again to the Calthorpe Motor Cycle Company, and production continued until 1938. Both cycles and motorcycles were produced in the Barn Street works, the car production moving out to Cherrywood Road.

Until production paused during WW1, Calthorpe used a wide range of engines in their motorcycles, starting with White and Poppe, then Precision, J.A.P. and in 1915 Peco 2-strokes.

In the late 1920s, the company launched a new range under the sub-brand of Ivory Calthorpe. Using a self-produced single-cylinder sloper-design engine, the engine was similar in proportions and output to contemporary BSA units. The ohv twin-port 348cc launch unit was fitted into a full-cradle duplex frame, and used a 3-speed Burman gearbox, with a tank mounted change. The engine breathed through an Amal carb, and used a BTH magneto mounted to the rear of the cylinder. By 1935 there was a 498cc option, but top speeds were similar at around 70 miles per hour (110 km/h). The design was sit-in as opposed to traditional bicycle sit-on design, later described by one tester as a "sack-of-potatoes slump!" With a marketing unit but no sales team, the motorcycles were exclusively sold by London-based dealer Pride & Clark in Stockwell Road, Brixton. P&C stated that the units should be sold at £52 and £54 respectively - a relatively high pricing for the time, but one which left a slim margin for Calthorpe MCC.

When the receiver sold the works in 1939, Bruce Douglas, the nephew of the founder of Douglas, bought the Calthorpe equipment and moved it to Bristol. He built new models powered by 347cc and 497cc Matchless engines, but only a few were built before production was stopped by the outbreak of World War II. Production did not recommence after the end of the war, and the equipment was sold to DMW.

== See also ==
- List of car manufacturers of the United Kingdom
