= Arno (automobile) =

English automobile manufactured in 1908

The Arno was an English automobile manufactured in Coventry only in 1908; the car, which featured a 25 hp White and Poppe engine and shaft drive, was introduced at that year's Stanley Show.
