= Academy (automobile) =

English dual-control car built by West of Coventry between 1906 and 1908

The Academy was an English dual-control car built by West of Coventry between 1906 and 1908. The cars had a 14 hp 4-cylinder engine by White and Poppe.

It was mainly sold to The Motor Academy in London, an early driving school which was probably the first to offer dual control (having additional set of driving controls), but it was also available to the general public.
