= Ambassador Motorcycles =

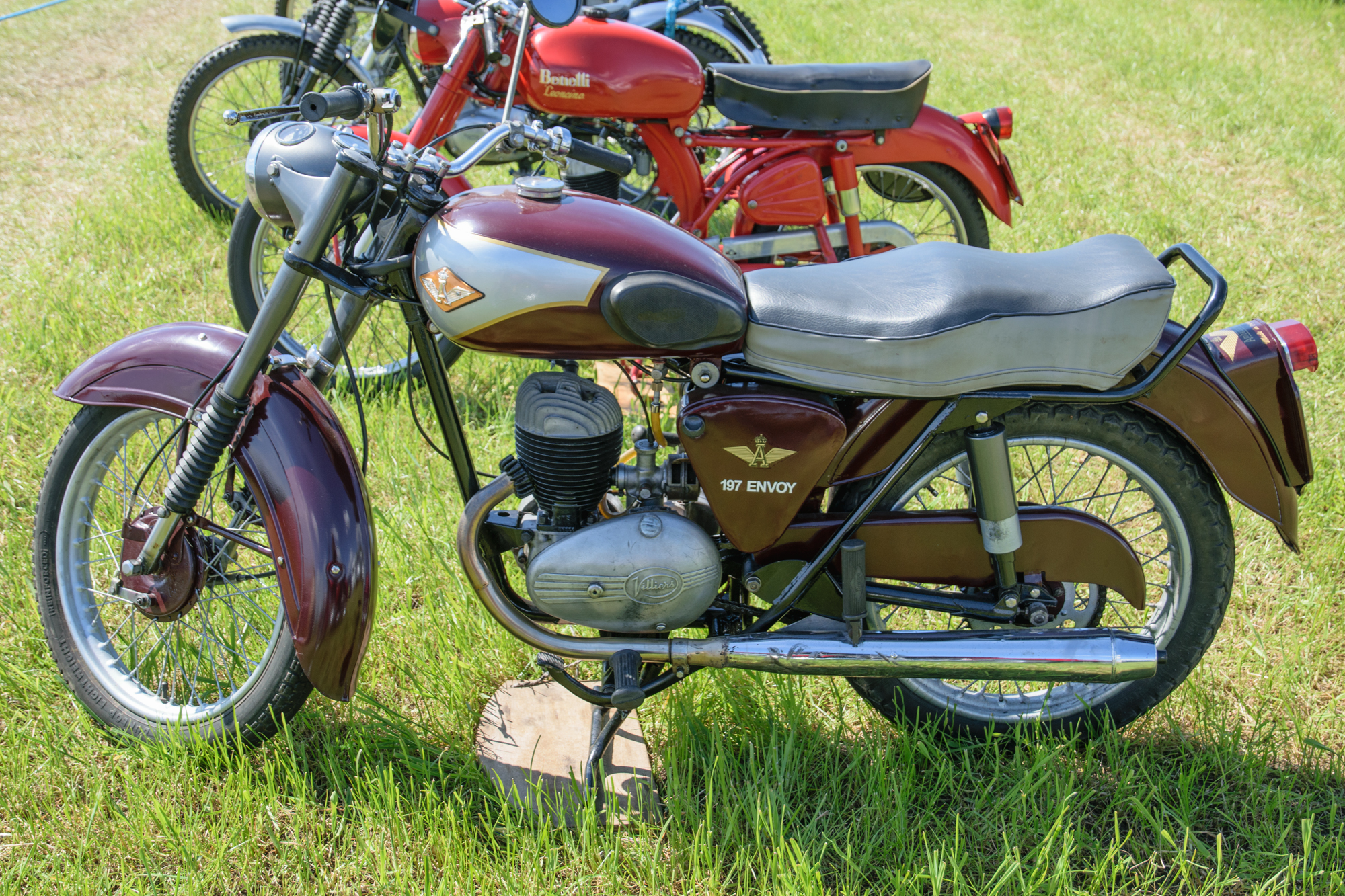
- Industry: Manufacturing and Engineering
- Founded: 1946
- Headquarters: Camden, London, UK
- Key people: Kaye Don, Darran Clarke
- Products: Motorcycles & Bespoke Clothing

Ambassador Motorcycles is a British motorcycle manufacturer. Founded by racer Kaye Don after World War II, the company produced lightweight motorcycles with Villiers and JAP engines and imported Zundapps from Germany. Production started in 1947 with a 197 cc Villiers-engined bikes. In 1953 a model was produced with electric starters and the first Ambassador twin appeared in 1957. The company was taken over by DMW in 1963 who continued production until they closed the company in 1965. Ambassador Motorcycles was reformed in late 2016.

== History ==
Founded by Irish motorcycle racer and 1920s Brooklands star Kaye Don in 1946 as "U.S. Concessionaires Ltd.", the company was started to import American cars. Motorcycle development started with a 494 cc vertical twin JAP-engined prototype. In 1947 the small Villiers engines were introduced and proved successful so were used until 1964. Ambassador motorcycles were costly and did not sell well, but exports to Australia and New Zealand were successful.

== Models ==
Model	Year	Comments
Popular	1951	Villiers-powered fitted with girder forks until 1953
Courier	1951	Villiers-powered
Embassy	1951	Villiers-powered
Supreme	1951	First fully sprung Ambassador with telescopic forks and plunger rear suspension
Sidecar	1953	197cc Villiers
Self Starter	1953	197cc Villiers
225cc Supreme	1954	Swinging arm rear suspension
150cc Popular	1956	Villiers 30C
Envoy	1956	Villiers
250cc twin	1957	Villiers engine
Statesman	1958	175cc
Popular	1959	
"3 Star Special"	1959	
Envoy	1959	
Super S	1959	
Electra 75	1961	
Sport Twin	1961	
175cc 'Scooter'	1961	
197cc Popular	1962	
50cc 'Moped'	1962	Villiers 3K two-speed
DMW Ambassador	1962	
Ambassador Supreme	2017	Suzuki-powered 300cc engine, fitted with USD forks & vintage "cafe racer" styling
Envoy 400	2021	classic inspired design powered by a 399cc engine from Shineray Group, owner of Italian SWM (motorcycles)
