= Johnson, Hurley and Martin Ltd =

Johnson, Hurley, and Martin Ltd.
- Company type: Private
- Industry: Petrol engines for cars and cycle-cars
- Founded: 1903
- Founder: George Johnson; Daniel Henry Hurley; James Richard Martin
- Fate: Liquidated 1927
- Headquarters: Alpha Works, Gosford Street, Coventry, United Kingdom
- Area served: United Kingdom
- Key people: George Johnson; Daniel Henry Hurley; James Richard Martin; Harry Cantrill

Johnson, Hurley and Martin Ltd were based at the Alpha Works in Gosford Street, Coventry, England and made engines for several car manufacturers as well as the engines for the Weaver Aircraft, which was the first monoplane to fly in England in May, 1910. They continued in various forms of engine production until c1927, with the contents of the Alpha Works being sold off by the Receiver in February 1928.

== Company History ==
The company was formed by George Johnson, Daniel Henry Hurley and James Richard Martin who had worked as partnership from about 1901 and formed the company in 1903. Daniel Henry Hurley was previously one of the partners of the Forman Motor Manufacturing Co of Paynes Lane, Coventry, who manufactured car engines from about 1901. Their partnership was dissolved in 1903, with the business continuing under Charles Edward Forman.

George Johnson, Daniel Henry Hurley and James Richard Martin also formed a partnership with Albert Edward Smith and traded as The Coventry Aero and Marine Engine Company of 61a Stoney Stanton Road, Coventry - this partnership was dissolved at the end of 1911, but the company continued under Daniel Hurley and James Martin, and during WW1 was engaged in making seaplane and chassis parts.

== Engine Production ==
Up to about 1909 the company produced motor-car engines for the Calthorpe company. They were named 'alpha' engines after the name of the works. In the 1907 Olympia show report the Calthorpe car is described as being fitted with an "Alpha engine of four cylinders (93mm by 104mm), cast in pairs, this motor develops 21.8 h.p. by R.A.C. rating, its valves are all on one side, and had dual ignition plugs on top".

Other cars to use the Alpha engine included the Whitehead Car produced briefly in 1920 with a 11.9 hp Coventry Alpha engine., and in 1923 the Webb Super Nine, with a four cylinder water-cooled Alpha engine.

They also produced the engines for the Weaver Monoplane (or ornithoplane) designed and built by the proprietor of Coventry Victor Mr W. A. Weaver, with a 9 hp engine for the first monoplane proving to be not sufficiently powerful and only providing a few short hops in 1906, the later 4-cylinder 20 hp engine allowed the Weaver Ornithoplane No.2 to become the first monoplane to fly in England in May 1910 covering a quarter of a mile at heights of up to 50 feet at Hampton-in-Arden near Coventry, England. The Alpha engine was also used by the Arden Car Company which was located at Balsall Common near Coventry. There is a fine example of this beautiful small car in the Coventry Motor Museum.
