= Coventry Victor =

British motorcycle and car manufacturer

The Coventry Victor Motor Co Limited
- Industry: Manufacturing and engineering
- Founded: 1911
- Defunct: 1971
- Successor: A N Weaver (Coventry Victor) Limited.
- Headquarters: Coventry UK
- Products: Small horizontally-opposed petrol and diesel engines, motorcycles and small cars

Coventry Victor was a British motorcycle and car manufacturer. Originally Morton & Weaver, a proprietary engine manufacturer in Hillfields, Coventry, founded in 1904, the company changed its name to Coventry Victor Motors in 1911. The company closed in 1971.

== Morton & Weaver ==
Thomas Morton and William Arthur Weaver established Morton & Weaver Limited in Coventry in 1904 as engineers and toolmakers. In 1911, they established a new company, Coventry Victor Motor Company, to pursue their interest in motor engineering, while the original company continued as toolmakers.

== Coventry Victor aero engines ==
Weaver was a pioneer in designing and building aircraft, and by 1905 Weaver was designing and building his first ornithoplane (monoplane) utilising a nine-horsepower engine built by Johnson, Hurley and Martin Ltd. Although it was claimed it flew at Hampton-in-Arden in July 1906, it was just "short hops", and it was reported that "the machine more or less failed due to lack of engine power".

The Weaver Ornithoplane No 2 was built from No 1 but with a more powerful engine and was towed on its own wheels behind a motor car to Hampton-in-Arden (the wings being strapped to the sides of the car), and was assembled and flown on 17 May 1910. In a series of four tests the Ornithoplane achieved a steady flight for a quarter of a mile, becoming the first monoplane to fly in Britain. The construction was of aluminium and bamboo, with an aluminium propeller driven by a 20 hp engine, and a wing span of about 45 feet. The four cylinder engine was also made by Johnson, Hurley and Martin at their Alpha Engine Works in Gosford Street, Coventry.

In 1955, Weaver, then managing director of the company, converted one of the company's air-cooled flat four industrial engines for aircraft use and a Piper Cub fitted with the engine completed 50 hours flight trials at Southend in July 1955. The engine, referred to as the 'Flying Neptune', was found to be a little heavy and a little low on power, but otherwise performed admirably.

== Coventry Victor motorcycles ==
In 1919 Coventry-Victor, using their 688 cc flat-twin engine, started making motorcycle and sidecar combinations, many of which were used as commercial outfits and became one of England's leading producers of horizontally opposed twins. They also had a factory in Brussels, and in 1922 they sold one of their motorcycles to "H.M. King of the Belgians", with all parts being made in Coventry and assembled in Brussels. The 1927 Coventry-Victor Silent Six has today become a sought after classic motorcycle. Motorcycle production ended in 1936.

The company supplied engines to many motorcycle and cyclecar makers. Examples include the Victoria Motor & Cycle Co, who launched their 688 cc Victor-engined motorcycle in 1919, and Grahame-White cyclecars.

== Coventry Victor cars ==
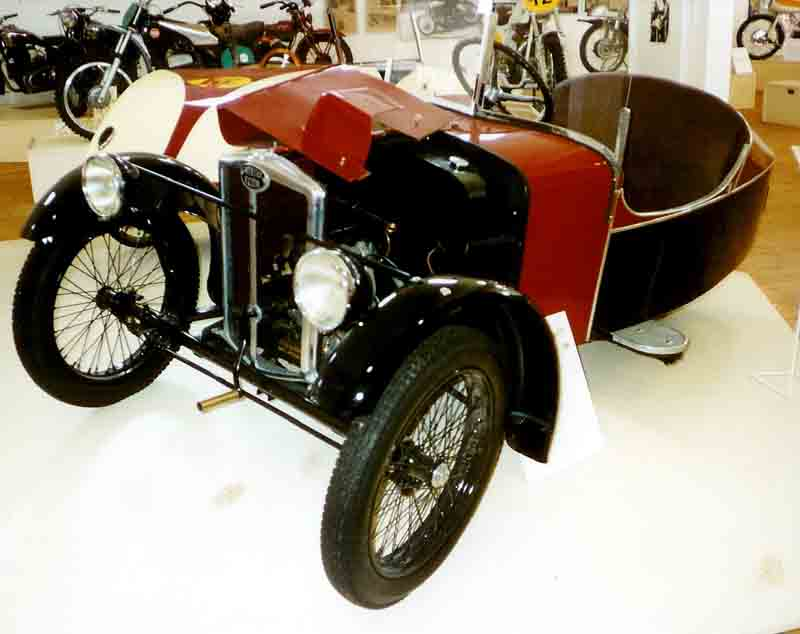
Coventry-Victor 3-wheeler, 1933

By 1926, the company launched a two-seat, three-wheeled car with the single wheel at the rear as the Coventry Victor Midget. There were many versions including, the Standard, the Sports, the Super Sports, the De-luxe, and the Parcelcar; prices started at £75. The cars used variants of their own horizontally opposed twin-cylinder engines of 688 cc at first, later enlarged to 749 cc, 850 cc and finally 998 cc. These engines included side-valve and overhead valve air cooled versions of the engine (fan assisted), and water cooled versions. Drive was to the rear wheel via a two speed gearbox and chain drive. Early cars had a foot brake operating on the transmission, but later sports model had twin front brakes as well as electric start and reverse gear. There was an update in 1932 with styling by C F Beauvais and called the Luxury Sports with three-speed gearbox and costing from £110. The previous models remained available. Car production survived until 1938.

After the Second World War, a prototype codenamed Venus was made with flat-four 747 cc engine never reached production. There were six reported Venus prototypes all of which were ordered to be destroyed but one still exists at the Coventry Transport Museum. Little is known about the vehicle but it was found and recovered from a farm in the West Country in the 1980s

== Other products ==
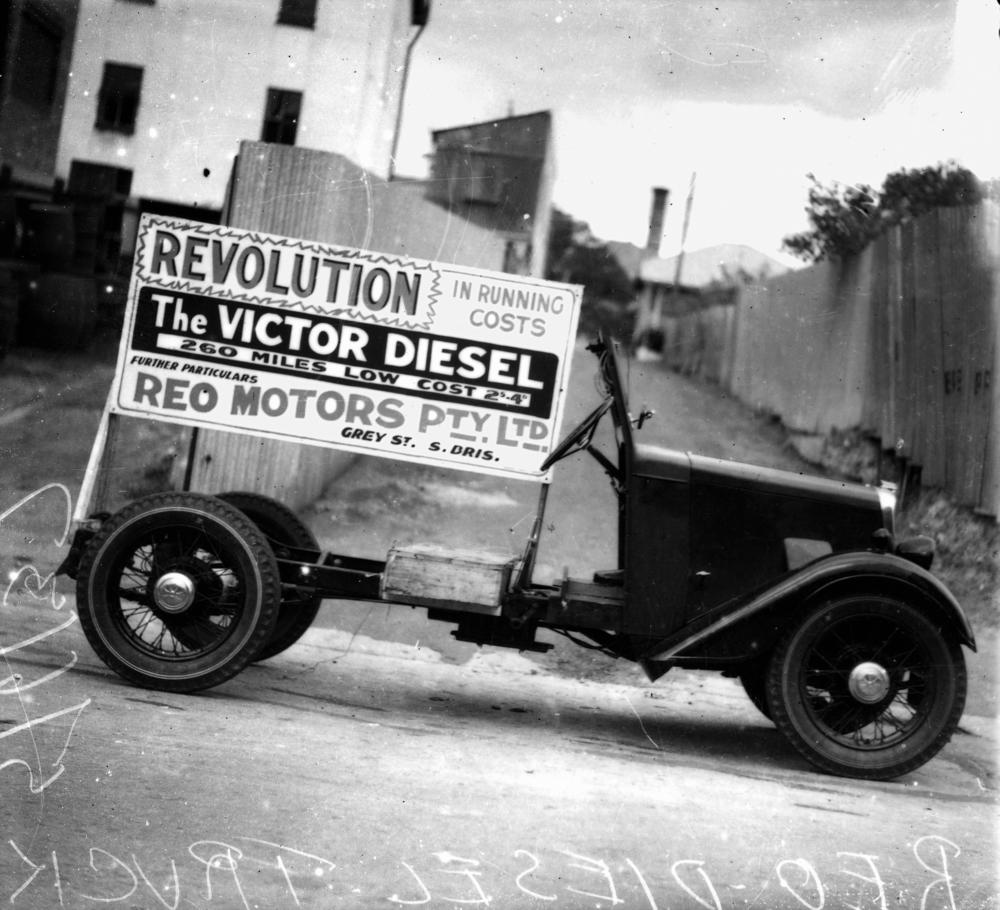
Victor Cub in a Jowett, Queensland

Maintaining their preference for the opposed twin cylinder design, Coventry Victor Motor Co built a twin cylinder diesel in the early 1930s known as the Cub. The design of the engine was illustrated in a GB patent by W.A. Weaver, M. Hamilton-Fletcher, and Victor Oil Engine Co in 1933. Bristol Tractor pictured a Cub-engined version of their tractor in 1933, though they fitted several different engines and it's not clear how many tractors were produced with the Cub engine. In 1935 the Coventry Victor Cub engine was available as the 19.5 hp Cub and 22 hp Cub Senior (10HP and 12HP nominal rating), and was described as originally having been designed for marine work.

The Victor Cub was promoted in Australia as having been used for cars and marine work and as a stationary power unit. The 1000 cc air-cooled twin-cylinder horizontally opposed engine was rated at 10 hp and gave a peak output of 20 hp at 2800 rpm. It could run at up to 4000 rpm without danger though normally governed to between 2000 and 2800 rpm. The light alloy combined crankcase and water jackets enclosed cast iron wet liner cylinder bores. The horizontally opposed shape of the engine made it particularly suitable to fit Jowett vehicles. It also suited boats of more than 15 tons displacement and an overall length of 34 feet or 10 metres.

In 1938 Bristol Tractor re-introduced the Bristol 10 tractor with the Coventry Victor Cub diesel engine in the model "D", with production continuing to 1942.

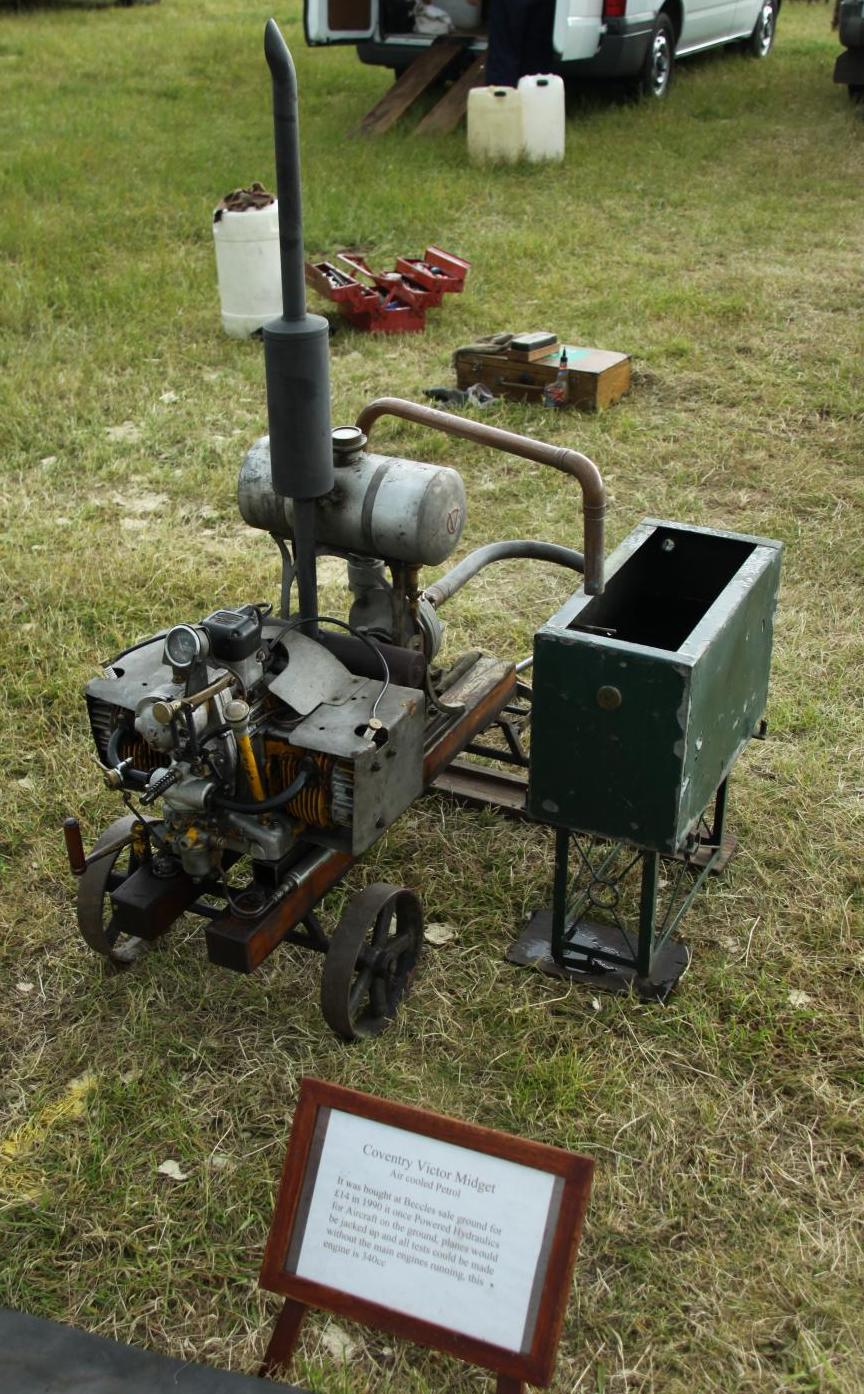
Coventry Victor Midget 540 cc petrol stationary engine used for testing aircraft hydraulics with main engines off

The two Cub engines were in production in 1942 though the company advert states the company making them had recently changed its name from Victor Oil Engines (Coventry) Ltd to Oil Engines (Coventry) Ltd, with the works being Atlantic Works, Harefield Rd, Coventry whereas in 1935 the Cubs were listed as made by Coventry Victor Motor Co Ltd of Cox Street, Coventry. Victor Oil Engines (Coventry) Ltd was a subsidiary of Coventry Victor Motor Co Ltd formed in 1933. By 1949 the production of the Cub engine has changed again, to Cub Oil Engines Ltd, Atlantic Works, Wishaw, Scotland. The Cox Street address still appeared in later adverts for Coventry Victor Motor Co Ltd.

In 1946 The Engineer magazine reported that Coventry Victor had added two new small flat twin petrol engines to their range, of 285 cc and 340 cc, known as the "Midget" - the two models only differing in the cylinder bore (55 mm and 60 mm respectively). The crankcases, cylinder heads, and pistons were all of aluminium alloy. The camshaft and crankshaft ran in ball bearings. These were available air-cooled (with added fan and cowling for stationary use), and as water cooled units for marine use which included outboard motors.

After the war, Coventry Victor Motor Co produced a range of petrol and diesel engines for marine and industrial use. The diesel engines included air and water cooled vertical single cylinder units (AD1, AD2, AD3 and WD1, WD2, WD3 models respectively), twin cylinder air-cooled HDA model, and water-cooled HDW models (also known as the Vixen). The petrol engines included twin cylinder air-cooled MA2 and AN4 models, and twin cylinder water-cooled MW2 and WN4 models. The AN4 was used in the 1950s by Thomas Green & Son on their Griffin models PRR and PRY motorised rollers. Coventry Victor also produced a flat-four air-cooled petrol engine (the AC4 or 'Neptune'), one use of which was in aircraft pressure test trolleys made by Sir George Godfrey & Partners. Major W.A. Weaver (managing director of the Coventry Victor Motor Co) converted one of these in 1955 for use in a Piper Cub aircraft, naming it the 'Flying Neptune'. Coventry Victor engines were also used in airfield pumping sets and to operate hydraulic ramps such as the Hylo Mk II mobile lifter made by Aviation Traders (Engineering) Ltd in the 1960s.

== Present day ==
The Coventry Victor Motor Company Ltd was wound up voluntarily in January 1971. A.N. Weaver (Coventry Victor) Ltd. was formed in July 1971 to provide spares and offer a service to maintain existing engines.

== See also ==
- List of car manufacturers of the United Kingdom
- List of motorized trikes
- List of motorcycles of the 1930s
