= Calcott Brothers =

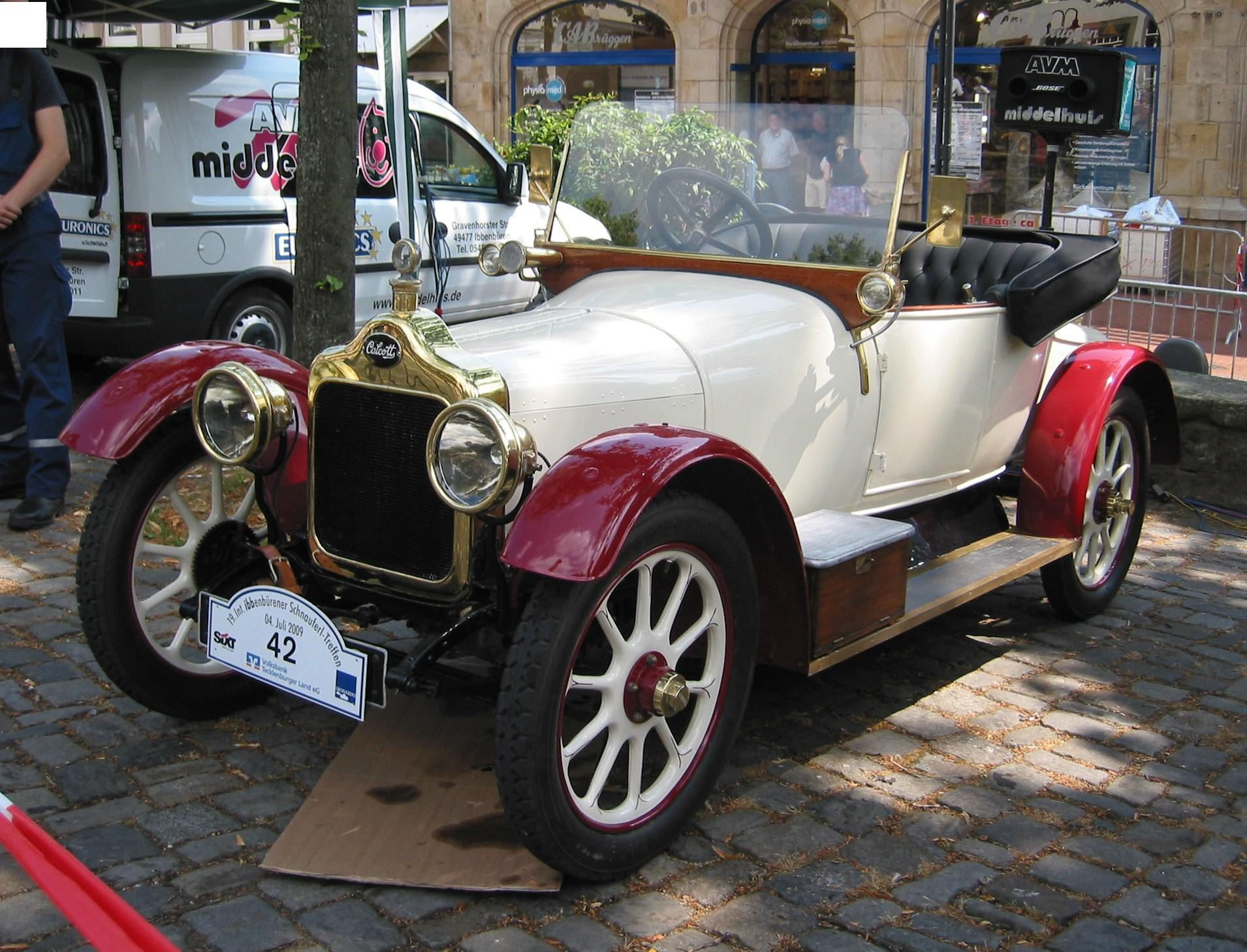
1914

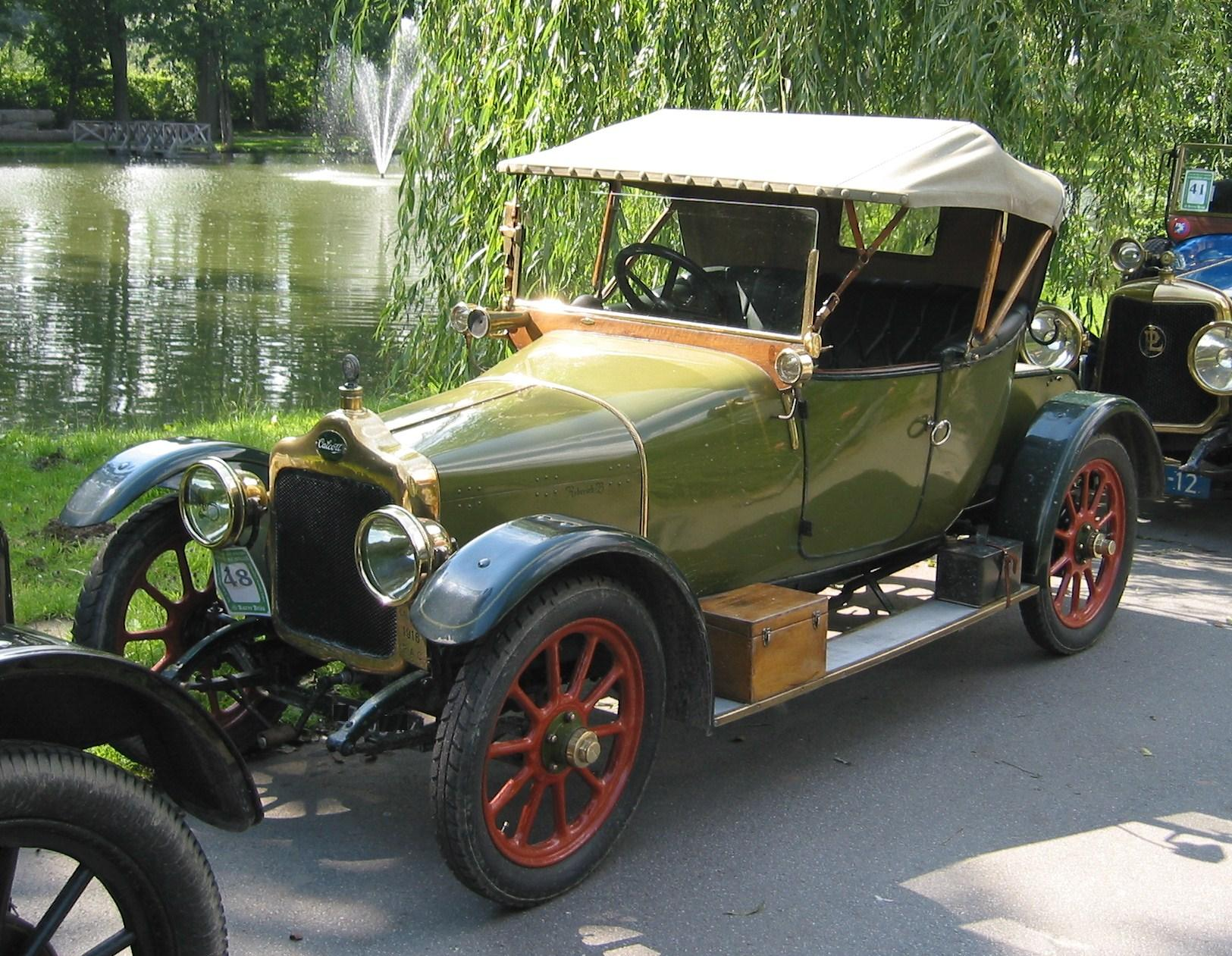
1916

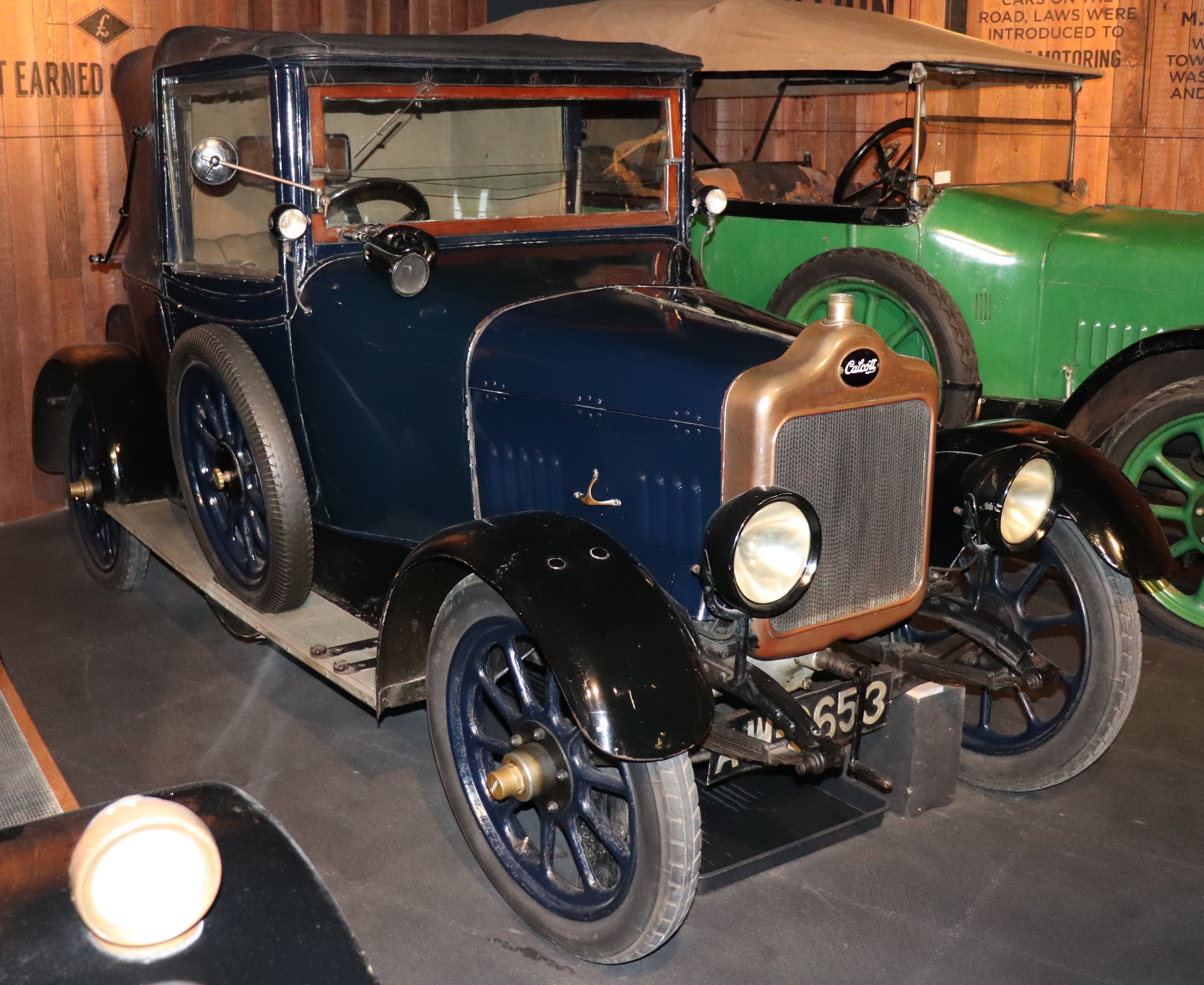
10 HP cabriolet 1921

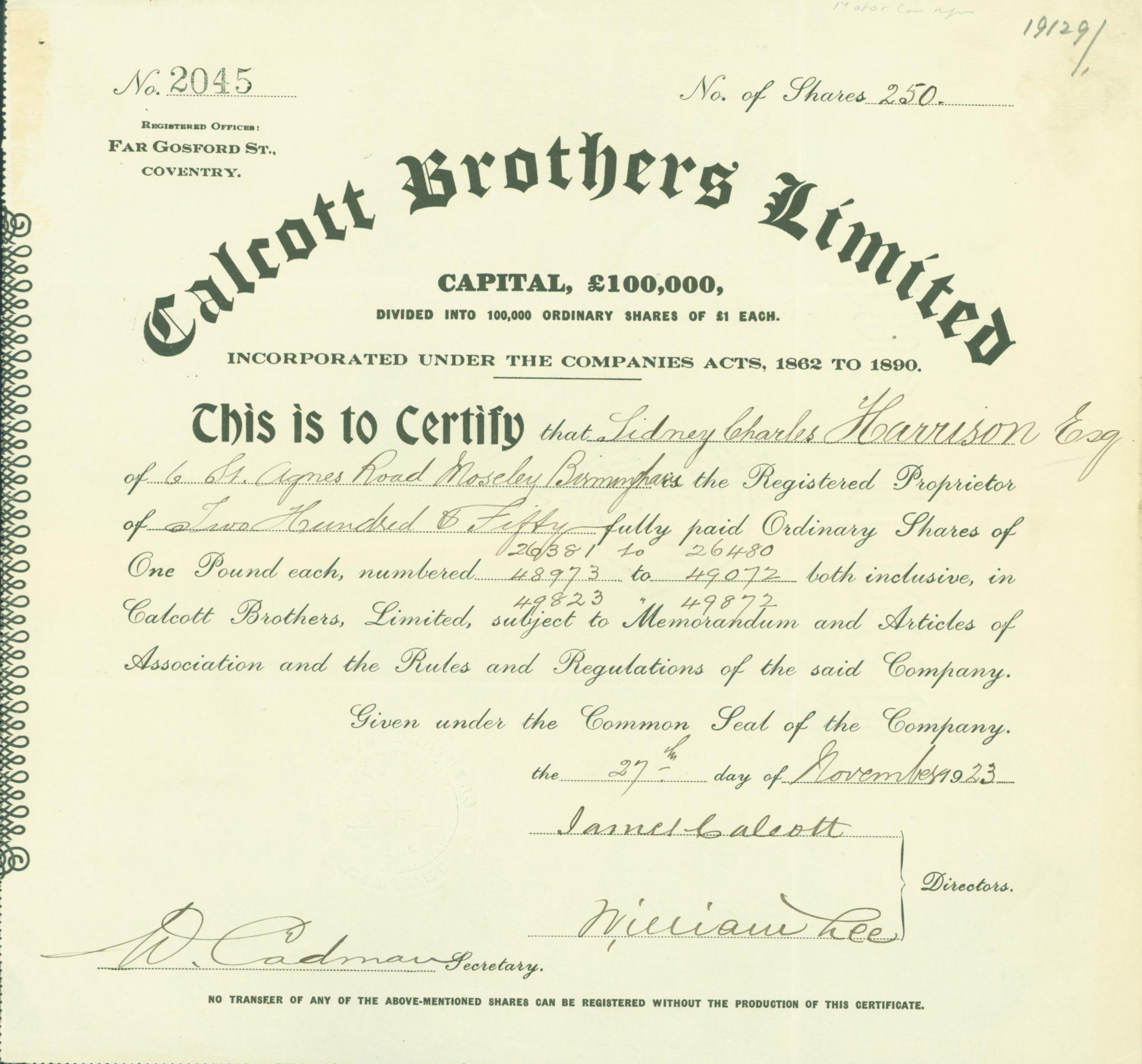
Share of the Calcott Brothers Limited, issued 27 November 1923

Calcott was a small English motor vehicle manufacturer based in Coventry. The company began as a bicycle manufacturer in 1886 taking advantage of a boom in the cycling industry at that time. The end of the century brought an end to the cycling boom and the demise of many bicycle manufacturers; however, Calcott managed to continue production and by 1904 was also building motorcycles. Production switched to automobiles in 1913 of which around 2,500 were made.

By the early twenties, Calcott was producing 55 cars a week however this was not enough to generate the funds needed for expansion, restricting their automobile manufacturing to a space designed to accommodate bicycle construction.

Following the death of chairman James Calcott in 1924 and large financial losses in 1925 it was acquired by the Singer automobile company in 1926.

In 1915, four different vehicle models were produced: the standard model, the convertible, the lightning set model, and a delivery model. The engine program from 1923 consisted of the 10.5 with 1456 cc, the 11.9 with 1645 cc, and the 13.9 with 2120 cc. In 1924, the vehicle program consisted of a two-seater/three-seater, a four-seater touring car, a coupe model, and a limousine vehicle.

== See also ==
- List of car manufacturers of the United Kingdom
