= DMW Motorcycles =

- Industry: Manufacturing and engineering
- Founded: 1945
- Defunct: 1971
- Fate: Company sold and became engineering and Villiers parts specialists
- Headquarters: Wolverhampton UK
- Key people: Leslie Dawson and Harold Nock
- Products: Motorcycles

DMW Motorcycles was a British motorcycle manufacturer. Based in Wolverhampton, DMW was founded in 1940. The company took over Ambassador Motorcycles in 1963 and continued production until they closed the company in 1965. Although DMW ceased motorcycle production in 1971, it was noted for trials and racing machines and many DMWs can still be seen at UK sporting events. DMW produced about 15,000 motorcycles and several other manufacturers used DMW forks and engines.

== History ==
Founded by Leslie "Smokey" Dawson who was granted British patents on rear swinging arm suspension, dual brakes and tele -matic front forks. As Dawson Motors Wolverhampton in 1940, DMW fabricated and fitted new swing arm kits to existing machines. Dawson's Telematic -forks, which were telescopic spring and pneumatic front forks that could be'retro-fitted' as a replacement to standard 'girder' forks. In 1943 Dawson added rear suspension options which he would fit in his Wolverhampton workshop. After the Second World War ended in 1945 Smokey Dawson began building D.M.W. grass track racing motorcycles machines with 350 cc and 500 cc JAP engines. Dawson went into partnership with former AJS and Vincent man Harold Nock to build light two-stroke motorcycles. Leslie Dawson was unsuccessful in raising venture capital and emigrated to Canada in 1948. Leslie died in Ellesmere Port on 6 January 1989.

Leslie was replaced by former BSA engineer Mike Riley, who won the under 200cc class in the1948 Scottish Trial on a DMW. Production moved to Harold Nock's premises in Sedgley and a 122 cc DMW with a Villiers engine was launched in 1950. These were entered in and won numerous competitions and DMW exhibited at the Earls Court Motor Cycle Show in 1952 with three road motorcycles and three racing bikes. Production then switched to a larger factory in nearby Sedgley, the base of Metal Profiles Ltd.

A range of relatively successful two-stroke models were produced throughout the 1960s, notably the DMW Dolomite. DMW production ended in 1971 and Harold Nock sold the company in 1975 to Graham Beddall and Ivan Dyke, who concentrated on engineering and selling parts, although they did build one-off competition motorcycles, and a DMW 250 cc won the Midland Centre Group Trials in 1976 and 1977. Beddall and Dyke retained ownership of the DMW name until 2001, when it was wound up.

The Sedgley factory remained in use until the mid-1990s, and stood derelict for several years before it was finally demolished in the summer of 2002 to make way for new private housing.

== Models ==
Model	Year	Notes
DMW De luxe	1953	Villiers 250 cc two-stroke vertical-twin .
DMW Coronation	1953	Villiers 10D 122 cc two-stroke
Cortina	1954	225 cc Villiers 1H engine
Dolomite 1	1954	250 cc ohc 4-stroke Ateliers Mechanique du Centre (AMC)engine
DMW Hornet	1954	125 cc ohc 4-stroke Ateliers Mechanique du Centre (AMC) engine
Moto Cross	1955	200 cc two-stroke
Trials	1955	200 cc two-stroke competition engine
DMW Leda	1955	150 cc two-stroke 'sports'
Bambi scooter	1957	98 cc Villiers 4F two-stroke
DMW Deemster scooter	1961–1967	249 cc Villiers twin-cylinder two-stroke. In 1968 they produced a version with a Velocette horizontally opposed engine (also used in the Velocette Viceroy scooter) but it was not a success and only around 350 were built, 250 of which went to the police fleet.
DMW Sports Twin	1962	249 cc two-stroke Villiers Mark 4T
DMW Dolomite II	1963	DMW-badged Ambassador motorcycles
250 cc Hornet	1964	Villiers 'Starmaker' 247 cc two-stroke road racer
Sports Twin	1964	Villiers 4T 249 cc two-stroke twin
DMW Typhoon	1965	494 cc Villiers two-stroke twin road racer
