= Birtley =

Birtley can refer to several villages in England:

- Birtley, Herefordshire
- Birtley, Northumberland
- Birtley, Shropshire
- Birtley, Tyne and Wear
- Birtley Green, Surrey

== See also ==
- Bartley
- Birtle (disambiguation)
- Birtles (disambiguation)
- Burtle
