= Birtles =

Birtles is a surname. Notable people with the surname include:

- Beeb Birtles, Dutch-Australian musician
- Bill Birtles, Australian journalist
- Francis Birtles, Australian adventurer
- Fred Birtles, English footballer
- Garry Birtles, English footballer
- Jasmine Birtles, British journalist and presenter

== See also ==
- Birtles Shorrock Goble, a music group featuring three original members of Little River Band
- Birtles & Goble, an Australian music duo
