= Vulcan (motor vehicles) =

Early 20th century car and commercial vehicle maker

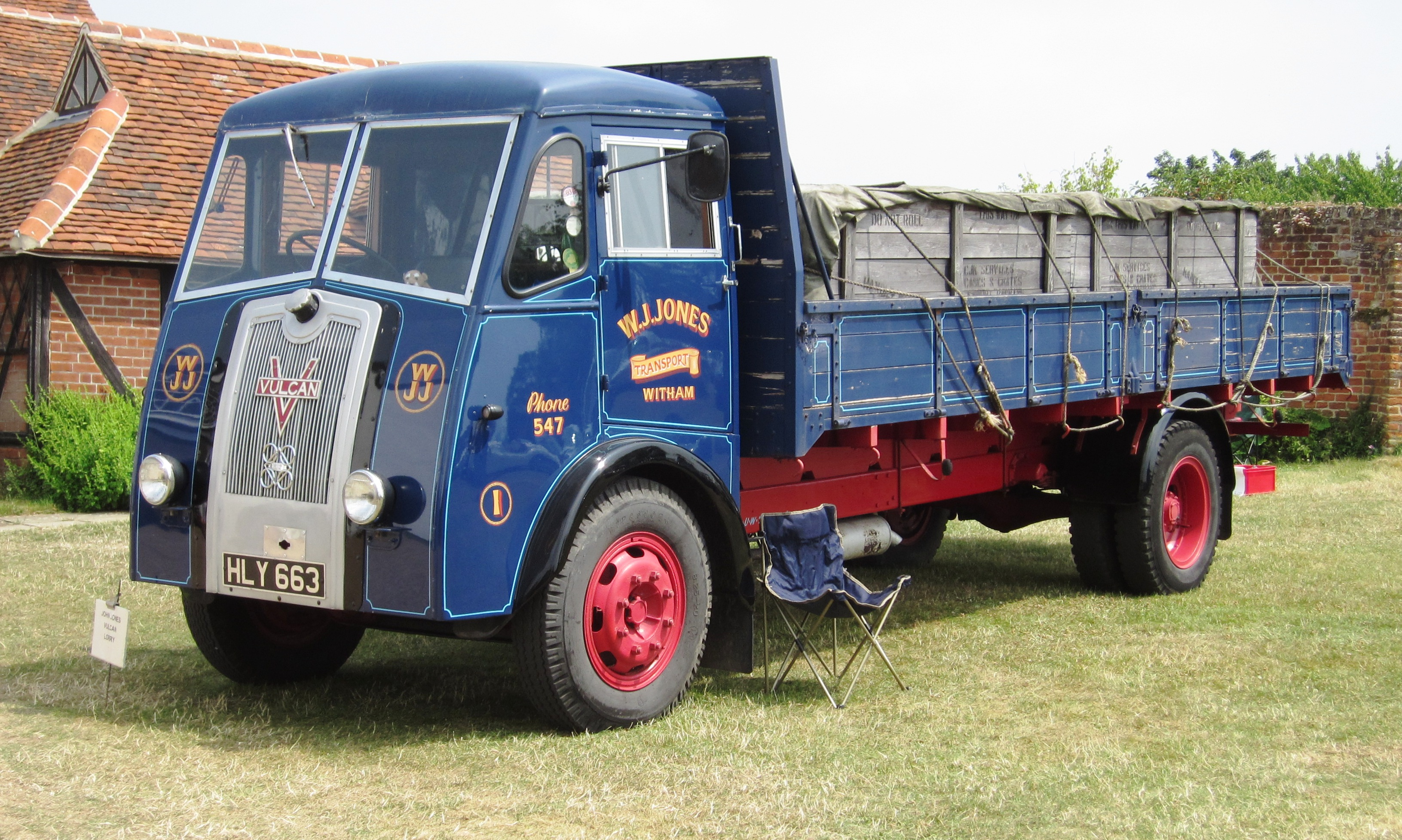
Vulcan lorry, built 1949

The Vulcan Motor and Engineering Company Limited, of Southport, England, made cars from 1902 until 1928 and commercial vehicles from 1906 until 1953.

== History ==
=== 1902-1918 ===
Brothers Thomas and Joseph Hampson had built an experimental car in Bolton in 1899. In 1902 they set up a factory in Yellow House Lane in Southport, trading as the Vulcan Motor Manufacturing & Engineering Company Ltd. Here they built the first Vulcan car, which was a 4 hp single-cylinder belt-driven type driving the rear wheels through a two speed gearbox and a belt to the back axle. In 1903, this grew to 6.5 hp with shaft drive and the chassis was now "armoured ash". Twin-cylinder 1.5 L models followed in 1904 now with steel chassis and in 1905, 2 and then 3 L four-cylinder types appeared and the company moved from Yellow House Lane to Hawesside Street, both in Southport. The company continued to grow and a van version of the twin was introduced in 1906 along with large 4.8 L six-cylinder models.

In 1907, the company moved to larger premises at Crossens, Southport, with the name being changed to the Vulcan Motor & Engineering Company (1906) Ltd. The six-cylinder engine grew to 6 L in 1908. In 1912, a new small car — the 10/12 of 1.8 L with a two-cylinder Aster engine — was added to the range, this being the first use of a bought-in engine.

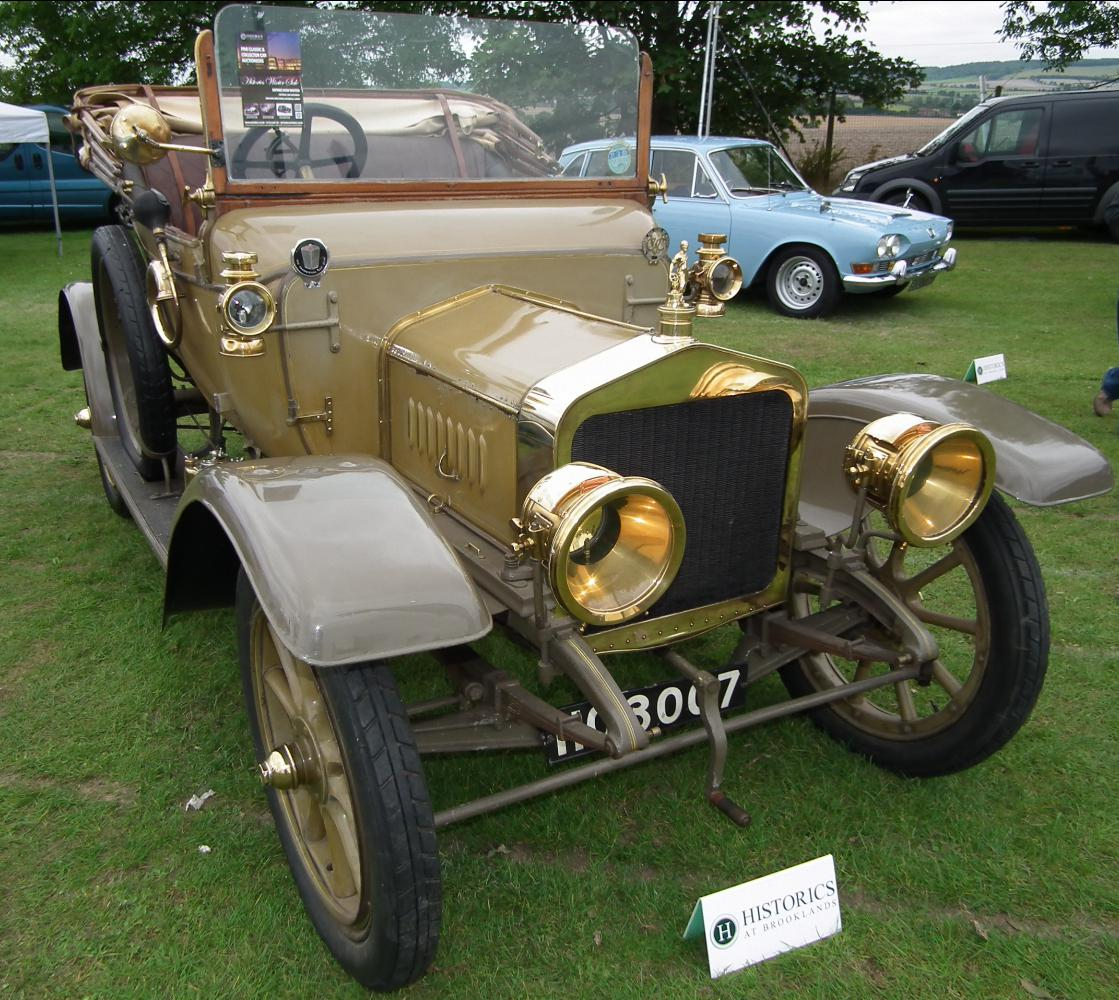
2-seater 1911 15.9hp 2.4-litres

At the outbreak of World War I, the car range consisted of the 2.4 L four-cylinder 10/15, the 2.6 L 15.9, the 3 L 15/20 and the last of the old sixes, the 25/30.

Up until 1914, Vulcan commercial vehicles had been based on car chassis. However, at this time a 30 long cwt (1.5 long tons) truck was introduced. This model saw use as an ambulance in Britain, India, Belgium, Russia, and Portugal. During the war, the factory concentrated on production of trucks, munitions and aircraft parts, in particular for Airco DH.9 biplanes.

In 1916, the Hampson brothers left the company and it was reformed as Vulcan Motor Engineering (1916) under the control of C.B. Wardman. In 1918, the company bought Southport F.C. which was renamed Southport Vulcan — thus becoming the first football club to take a sponsor's name. However, this arrangement only lasted for one season.

=== 1919-1930 ===
In 1919, Harper Bean acquired 75% of the company under a complex cash and shares deal and formed the British Motor Trading Corporation with the intention that Vulcan be responsible for commercial vehicles; nevertheless, car production continued. The group also included the Swift Motor Company and a number of components manufacturers.

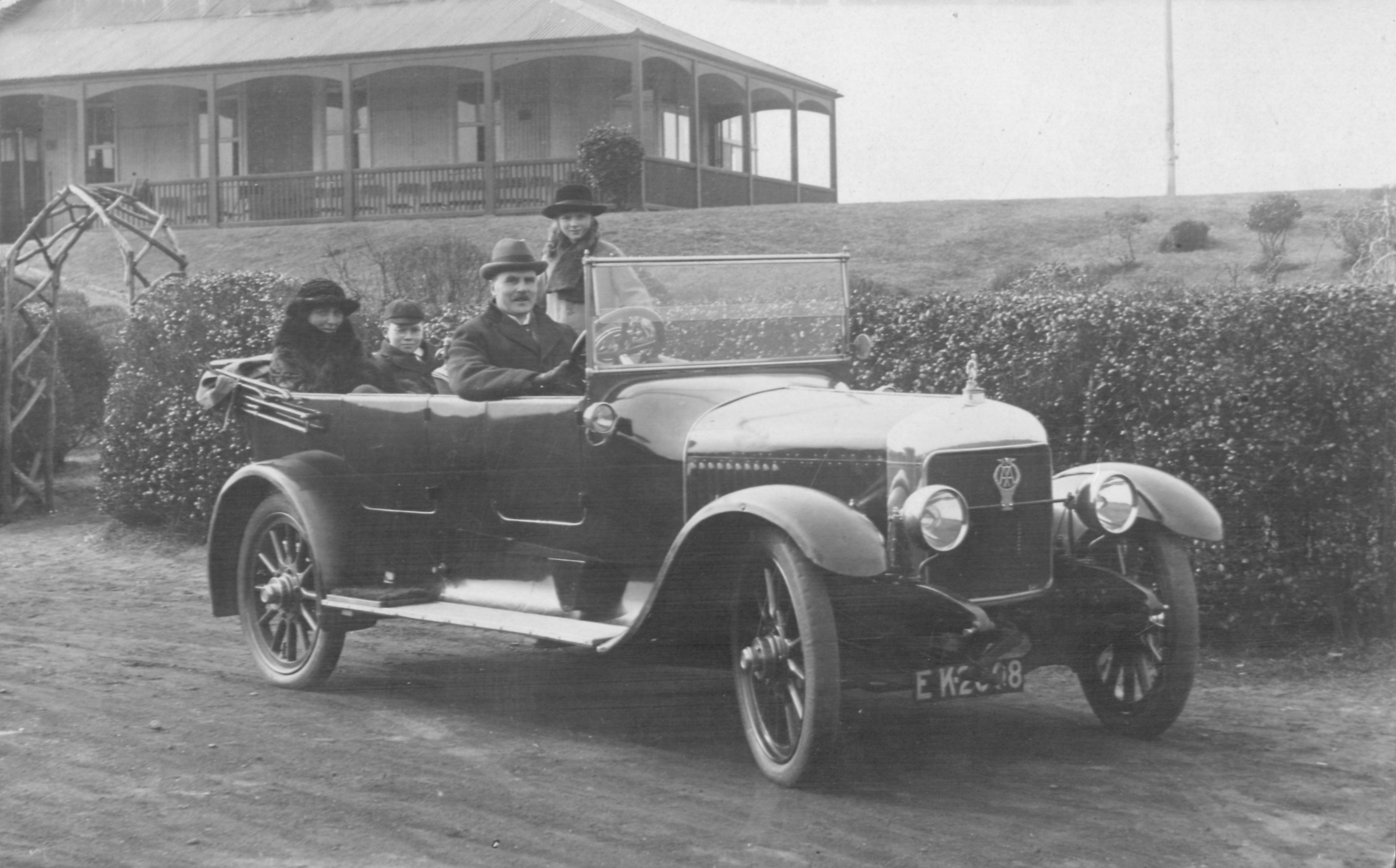
A 1922 Vulcan 20 HP Tourer

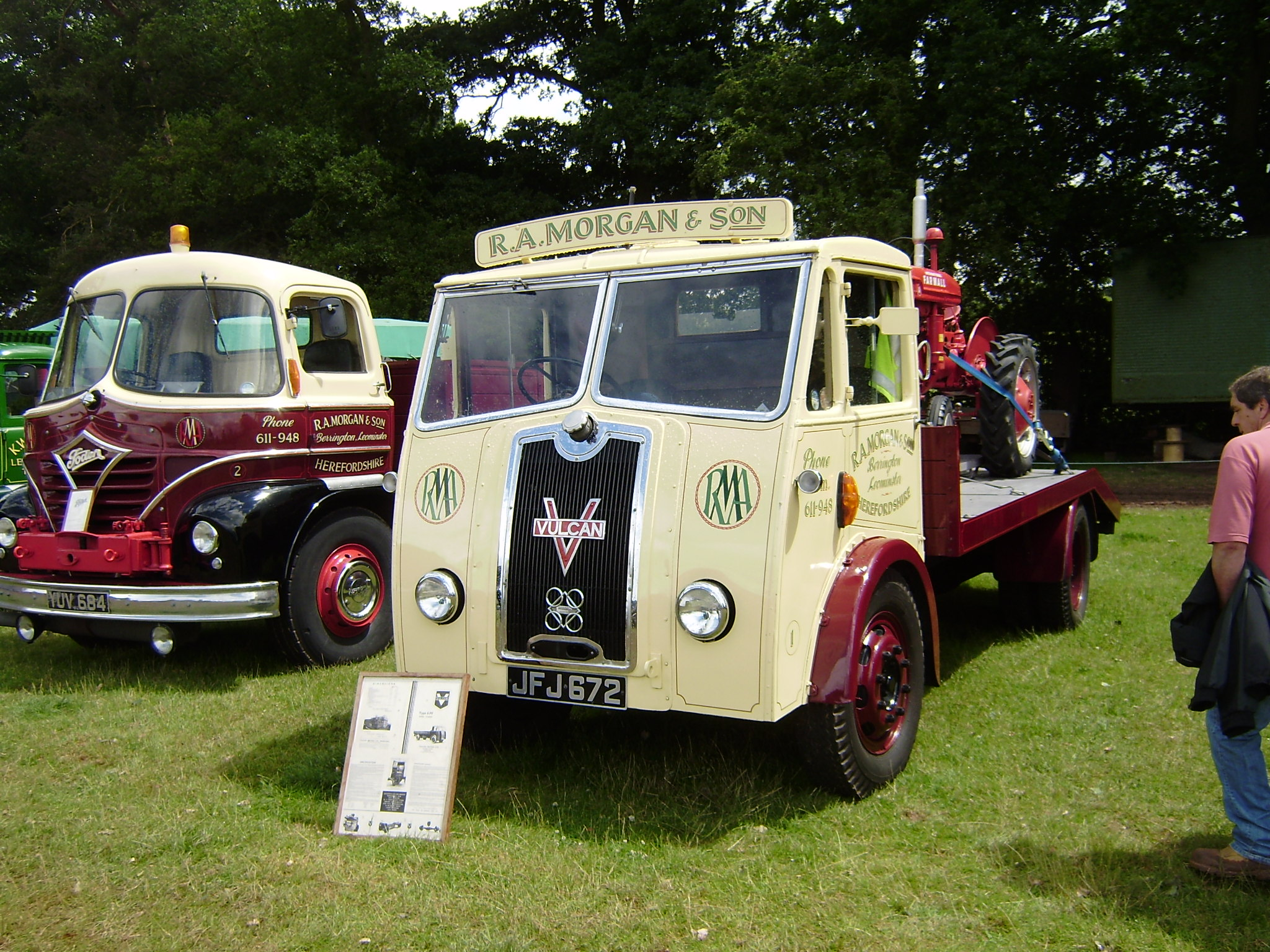
Vulcan truck

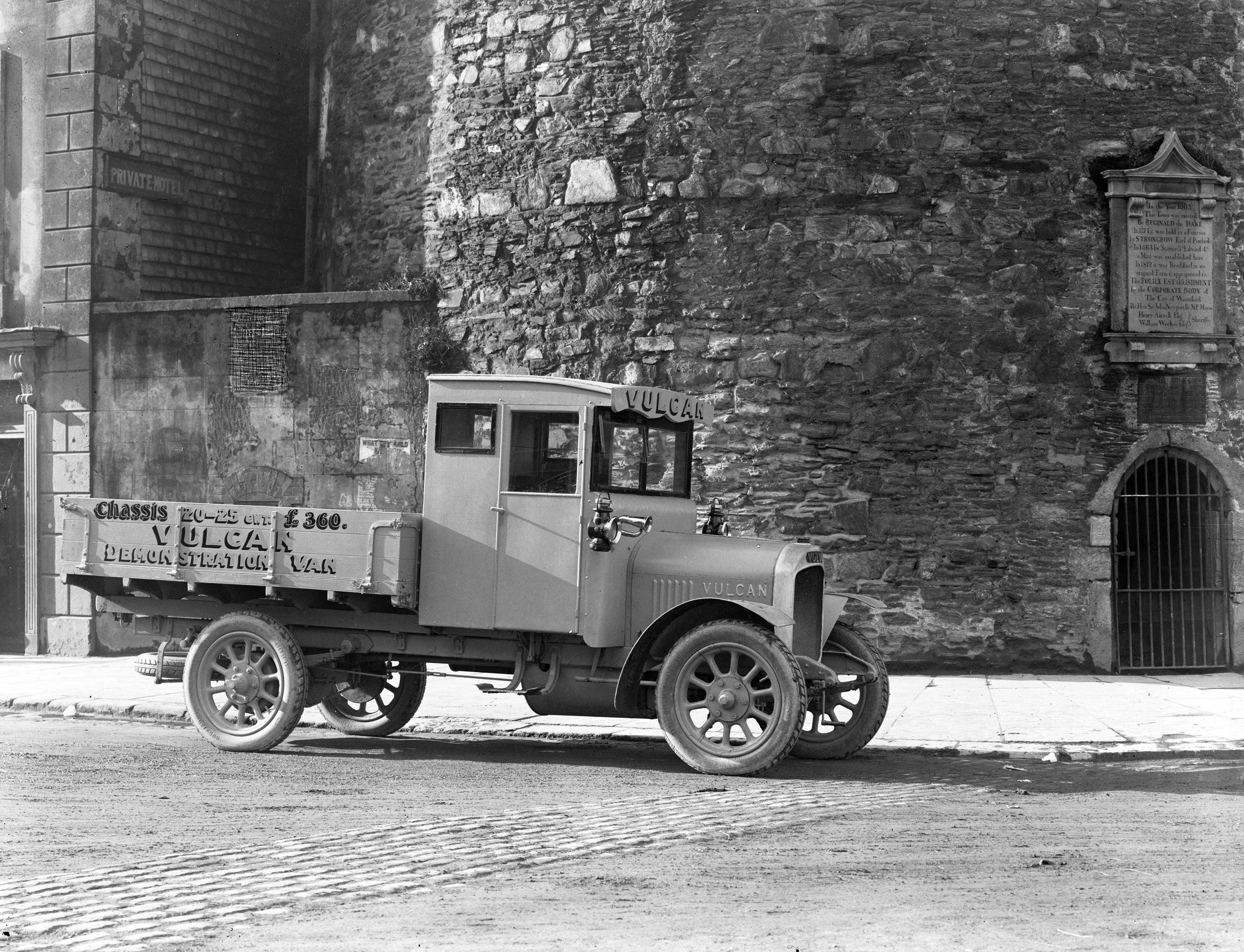
Vulcan demonstration van, £360 in 1924. Shown in Ireland.

With peace the first new car launch was the 16 with 2.6 L Dorman engine. The cars now had a flat radiator replacing the pre-war "bullnose" type. There was also a nominal 12 model which became the main product from 1920 to 1927, which was available with a range of engines from Dorman (1.8 L), Meadows (1.5 L), and British Anzani (1.5 L). The model was also sold as the Lea-Francis Kirkstone, as from 1922 the companies shared some manufacturing and a dealer network. The 20 was available from 1920 to 1922 with a 3.3 L Vulcan engine and from 1923 to 1925 with 3.7 L shared mechanical components with the 1½ and 2 ton trucks. The final car was the 14/40 (1927–28) and 16/60 (1928–29) with their own design twin camshaft six of 1.7 and 2 L. Production capacity was nearly 5,000 per annum, a potential never reached as the orders did not materialize. Nonetheless, over 6,000 Vulcans of all kinds were sold from the armistice until 1923, which proved to be a high watermark for the company.

In 1922 a new lightweight 4 ton articulated truck was introduced, although the 1½ and 2 ton models were the mainstay of truck production until the 1926 introduction of heavier four ton units, with four-cylinder engines and also a six-cylinder Dorman bus chassis. Commercial vehicles began to supplant automobiles as Vulcan's main product around this time, with buses and light (¾ ton) military vehicles alongside the trucks.

During the early 1920s, Vulcan bus models had been based upon commercial vehicle chassis. Early users included the local municipal authority, Southport Corporation, whose first bus in 1924 was a Vulcan VSD with a toastrack body, for use along the seafront. From 1927, purpose built bus and coach chassis were introduced to the range. These included several single deck models (such as the Prince, Duke and Duchess models). In 1930, the double deck Emperor was introduced, using Vulcan's own six cylinder engine. Customers for Vulcan buses included Crosville, Gloucester Corporation, further vehicles for Southport Corporation, and Douglas Corporation (who also took delivery of two Vulcan-built horse trams in 1935).

In 1928, Vulcan opened a new depot and service facility in Cricklewood, north west London. However, in the same year financial problems led to C. B. Wardman being replaced as chairman by William R. Challinor, M.B.E., with the decision being taken to end car production at that time (although some badged as Lea-Francis were made up to 1930).

=== 1930-1953 ===
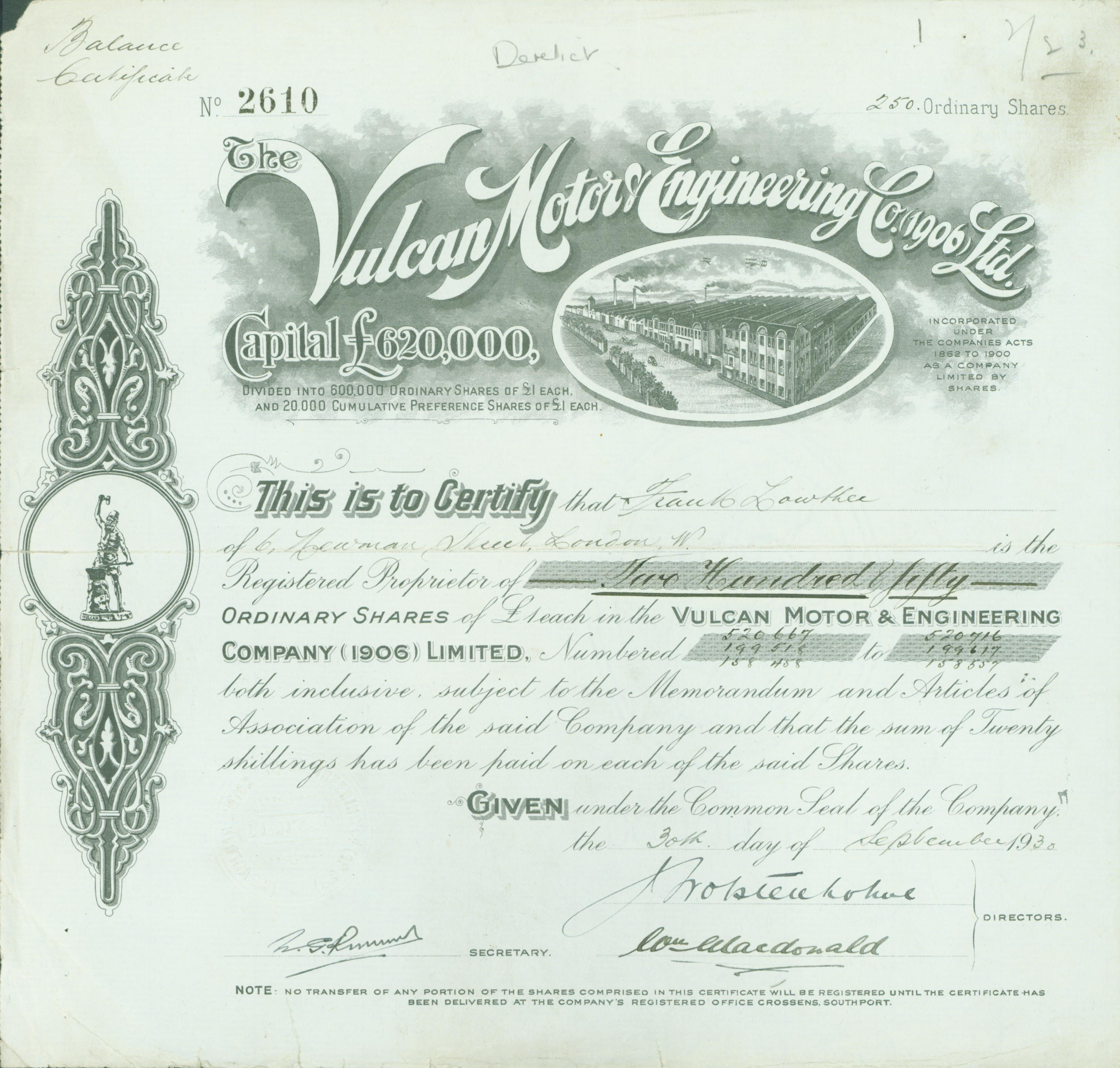
Share of the Vulcan Motor & Engineering Company, issued 30 September 1930

From 1930, production was solely of trucks and buses. Many of the trucks were aimed at the municipal market including specialist vehicles such as road sweepers, gully emptiers and dustbin lorries. By 1931 the company was in compulsory liquidation, although they continued trading in their more profitable fields for several years, building small volumes.

Brockhouse Engineering took over Vulcan in 1937, renaming the factory as Brockhouse Engineering (Southport). In the following year, the remaining assets of the Vulcan company were sold to Tilling-Stevens, with production moving to their factory in Maidstone, Kent. Vulcan (petrol) or Gardner (diesel) engined trucks re-entered production, alongside a new five ton, Perkins-engined lorry. Six ton Vulcans were produced in large numbers during World War II, also with electric power.

After the war, six tonners and heavier articulated trucks were built in large numbers, around 1000 per year, and a new seven tonner appeared at that 1950's Commercial Motor Show in London. In the same year, a new coach chassis was introduced. In 1951 Tilling-Stevens were taken over by the Rootes Group. Rootes, however, had their own established commercial makers in Commer and Karrier and as those brands introduced their own heavier trucks both Vulcan and Tilling-Stevens were squeezed out. The two brands vanished finally in 1953.

== Factory buildings ==
The original factory premises at Yellow House Lane in Southport were finally demolished on 25 March 2010 as a result of the British government policy to levy business taxes on the owners of empty buildings.

The second factory which was built in 1907 in Rufford Road, Crossens, Southport was demolished in early 2020 to make way for housing.

== See also ==
- Hick, Hargreaves & Co
- List of car manufacturers of the United Kingdom
