= Bean Cars =

British motor vehicle manufacturer

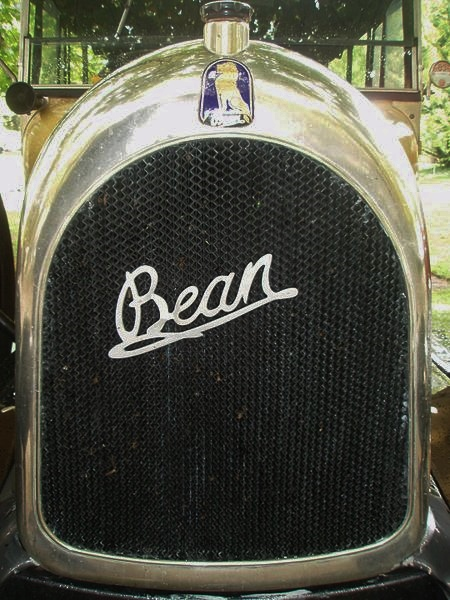
- Founded: January 1919 in Dudley, England
- Founder: Sir George Bean
- Headquarters: Dudley, England
- Key people: Sir George Bean; John Bean, CBE
- Products: cars (1919–29) light commercial vehicles (1924–31)
- Brands: Bean Cars
- Owner: A Harper, Sons & Bean (1919–26); Hadfields Limited (1926–56); Standard-Triumph (1956–60); Leyland Motors (1960–68); British Leyland/Austin Rover (1968–88) independent (1988–95); Ferrotech (1995–2005)

Bean Cars was a brand of motor vehicles made in England by A Harper Sons & Bean, Ltd at factories in Dudley, Worcestershire, and Coseley, Staffordshire. The company began making cars in 1919 and diversified into light commercial vehicles in 1924. For a few years in the early 1920s Bean outsold Austin and Morris.

Bean suffered financial difficulties and the steel-maker Hadfields Limited took it over in 1926. The launch of an under-developed new model in 1928 worsened sales, and the company stopped making cars in 1929. Hadfields continued Bean commercial vehicle production as "Bean New Era" until June 1931. In 1933 Hadfield re-launched the company as Beans Industries, making components for other motor vehicle manufacturers.

== History ==
=== Foundation ===
Absolom Harper founded the iron foundry A. Harper & Sons in Dudley in 1822. George Bean married Absolom's granddaughter and in 1901 became the company's principal shareholder. In 1907 George became company chairman and the name was changed to A. Harper & Sons & Bean.

The company had been a supplier of car parts and in 1911 the company installed drop hammers to increase production and in 1912 the company opened a new forging plant in Smethwick. At the same time George Bean served as Mayor of Dudley in 1908, 1911 and 1912.

In First World War Bean prospered from military contracts to supply shrapnel and shell cases to the government. The company's factories were expanded in order increase production. By 1916 Bean was making about 21,000 shells a week. After the war George Bean was knighted for his wartime service and his son Jack was made a CBE.

After the war Bean needed a product to replace the gap left by the end of military contracts so Bean entered the increasingly active car market by becoming a car maker. The manufacturing rights for the pre-war Perry car were for sale so in January 1919 A. Harper & Sons & Bean bought them for £15,000, giving it a quick entry into the car market. It set up a new factory in Hurst Lane, Coseley, to make the chassis, which were then driven to Dudley where the company's Waddams Pool works built the bodies.

The first model had a 1795 cc four-cylinder engine linked to a separate three-speed gearbox. It was a revival of the pre-war Perry 11.9, and was rated at 11.9 RAC horsepower. The Bean 11.9 in chassis form initially cost £400, but this was reduced to £245. A four-seat open body was £80. Production of the model peaked at 80 a week in 1922; about 10,000 were made in total.

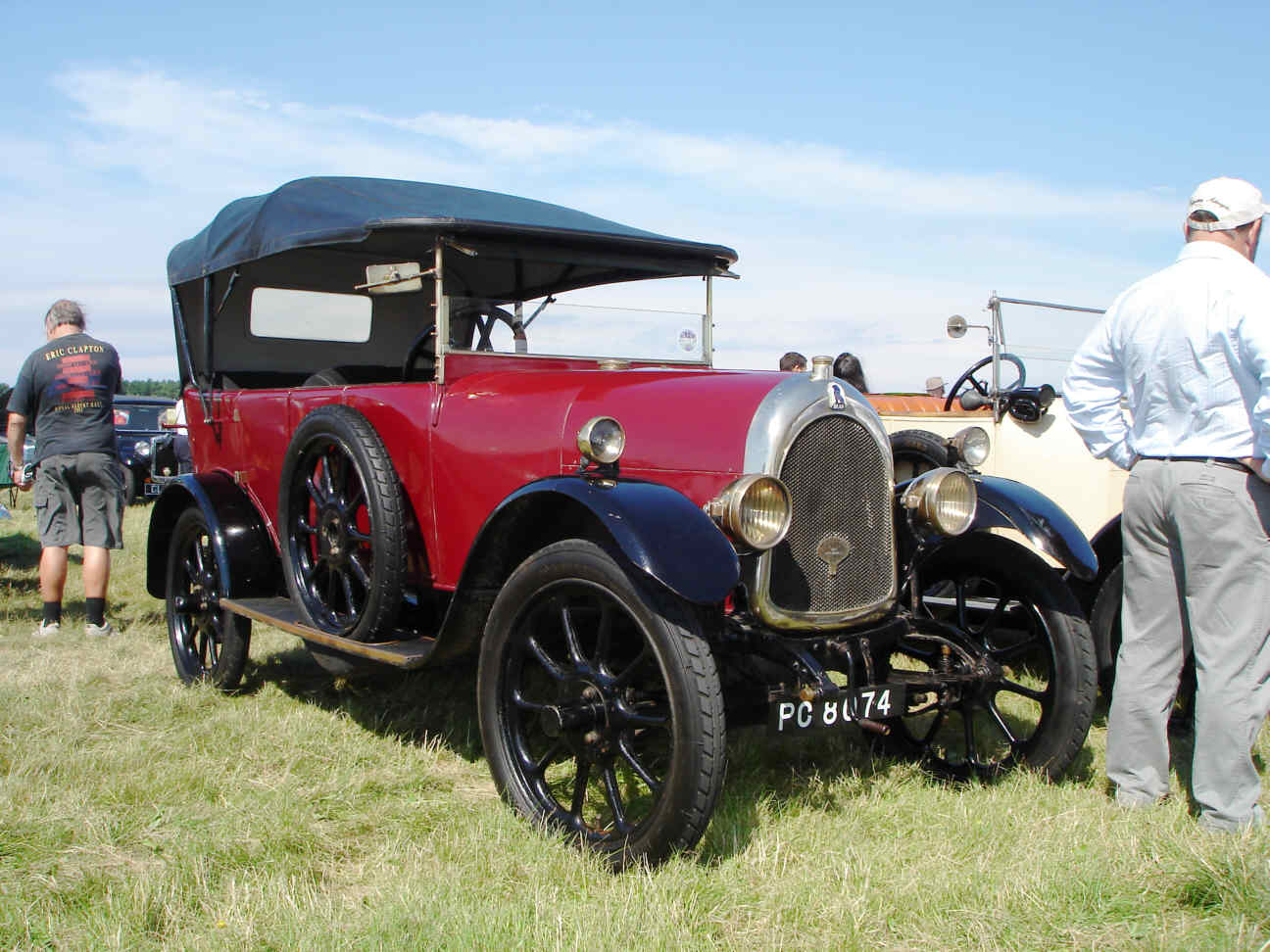
1922 Bean 11.9 HP

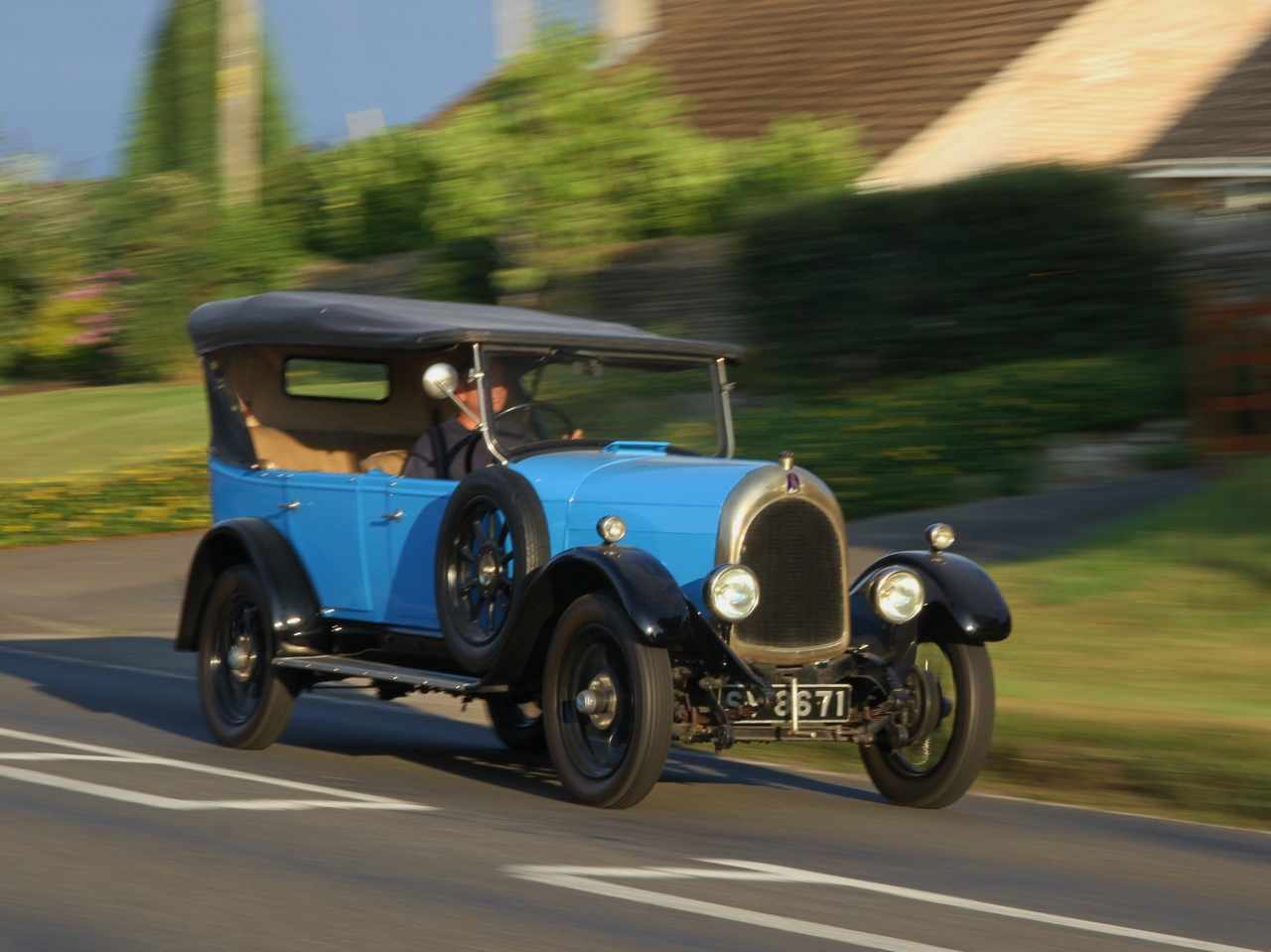
1927 Bean "Short 14"

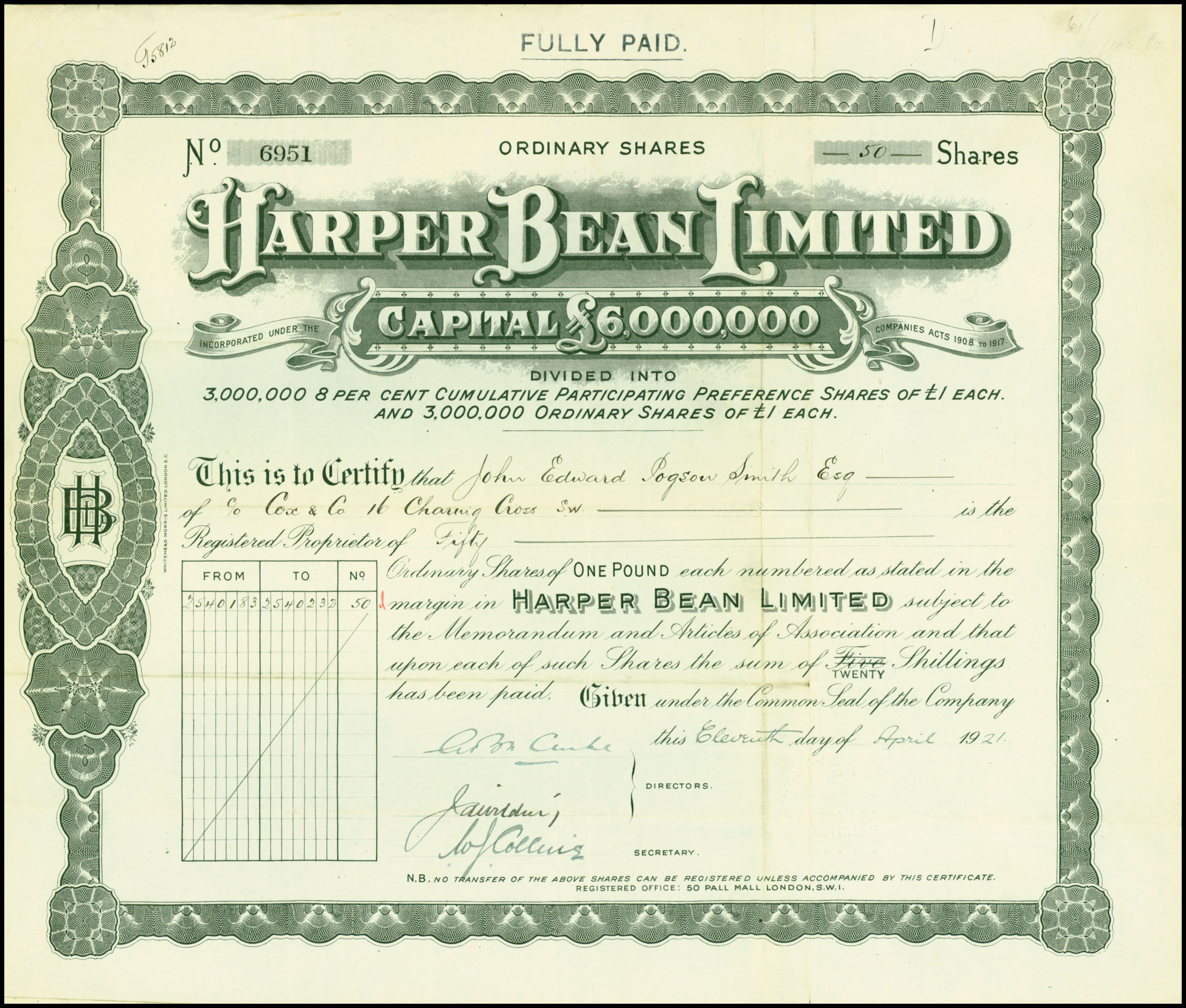
Share of the Harper Bean Ltd., issued 11. April 1921

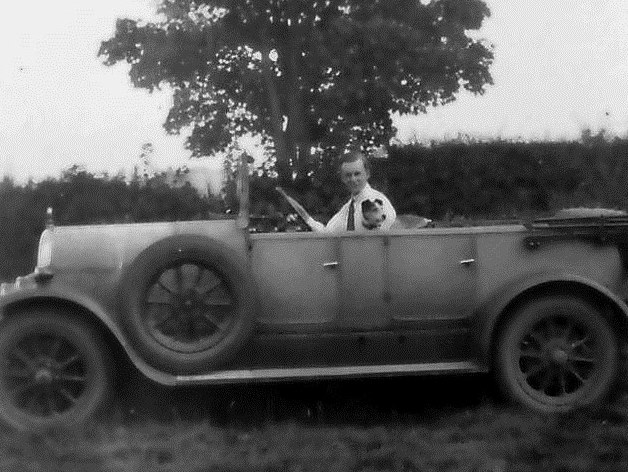
Bean 11.9 HP Open Tourer

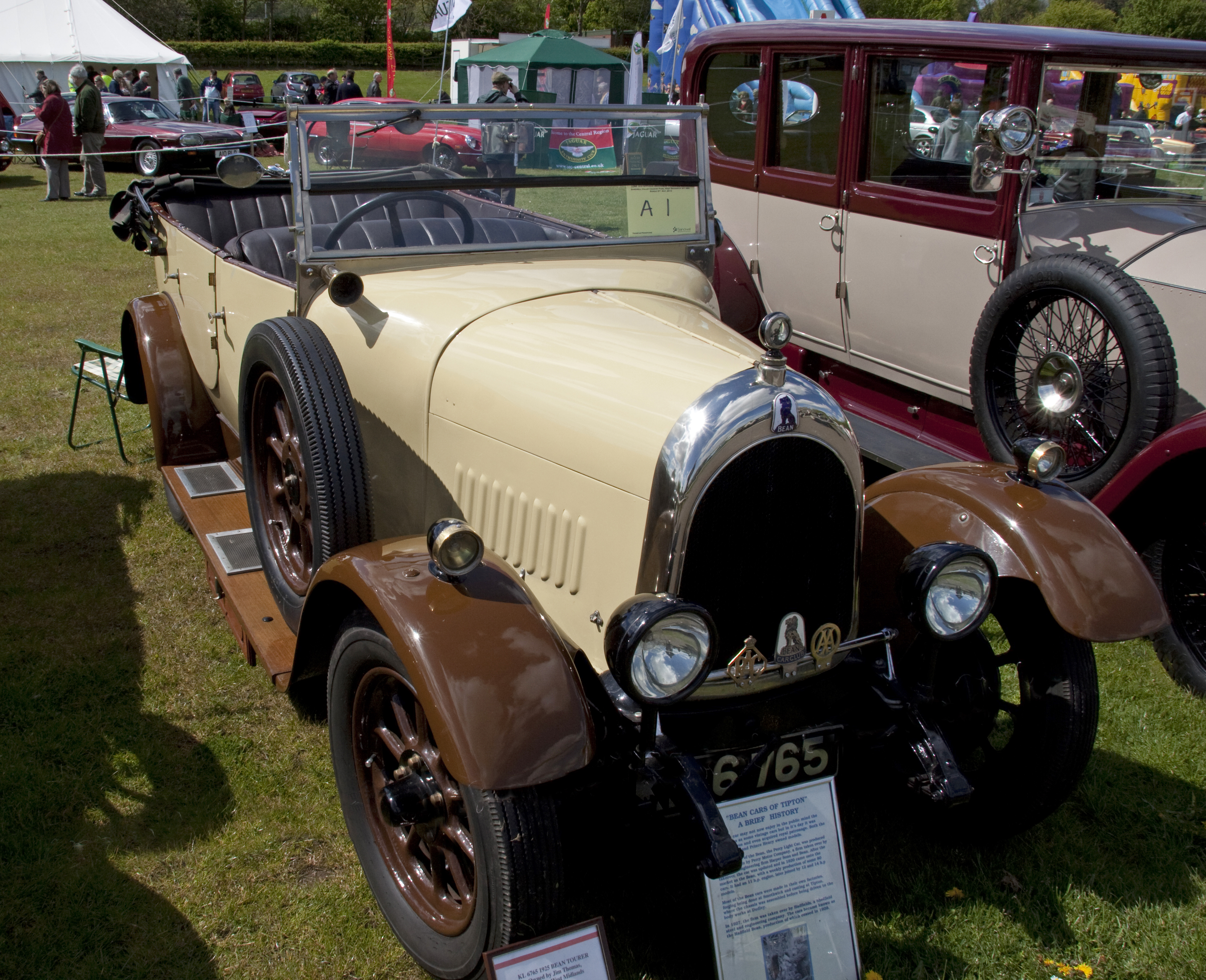
1925 12 HP Open Tourer

=== Harper Bean Group ===
The proposals to form this group and issue its shares to the public were announced on 27 November 1919, during London's Olympia Motor Show, the first show since the Armistice.

Jack Harper Bean was managing director of the company and he visited America in order to buy the latest machinery for car-making. Bean became one of the first UK companies to adopt twin moving track assembly lines. Bean also wanted to form a consortium of manufacturers along the lines of the General Motors model. He brought together a group of companies including the vehicle makers Swift and Vulcan, the steel-maker Hadfields, and the Regent Carriage company and together they formed Harper Bean Limited in November 1919.

Harper Bean Limited offered its shares for sale for which buyers would be required to pay £6 million though only £1.5 million would be offered to the public. The £6 million proceeds would be used to buy:

- 99 per cent of shares in A Harper Sons & Bean Limited of Dudley, Tipton and Smethwick
- 166,666 shares in Hadfields Limited of Hecla Works, Sheffield to a value of £250,000
- 60 per cent of the shares in The Vulcan Motor and Engineering Co Limited of Crossens Southport
- 50 per cent of the ordinary shares in Swift of Coventry Limited, Cheylesmore Coventry
- 50 per cent of the ordinary shares in British Motor Trading Corporation Limited (Motor Union Insurance—AA)
- 50 per cent of the ordinary shares in Harvey Frost Limited (of Great Portland Street, distributors of recovery cranes)

together with Rushmores (1919) Limited, Jigs Limited, Regent Carriage Co Limited, Gallay Radiator Co Limited, Aeromotor Components Limited and Alex Mosses Radiator Co Limited

Harper Bean Limited would carry on the business of ironfounders, metalworkers and manufacturers and distributors of motor vehicles. (Note: Directors were H J Whitcomb of British Motor Trading (chairman) J Harper Bean of A Harper Sons and Bean (managing director) R Burns of Swift of Coventry A B H Clerke of Hadfield’s J E Hodgkin of Motor Union Insurance C B Wordman of Vulcan Motor and Engineering J A Wilding consulting engineer) After investment in the above companies the balance of the new capital would be used to:

expand the plant of Harper Sons and Bean used for drop forgings, castings, stampings and kindred products and to extend the plant for the Bean car to 50,000 cars per annum
lay out a plant to produce another 50,000 complete engine and transmission units for Vulcan, Swift and other motor manufacturers
develop plant to produce Bean’s patented aluminium alloy body
increase Vulcan production from 500 to 10,000 motor vehicles per annum
increase Swift output to six times the current level

Distribution was intended to be carried out through British Motor Trading which belonged to the Automobile Association's Motor Union Insurance Initial plans called for annual production levels of 50,000 small cars together with 25,000 medium size cars and a further 25,000 lorries or commercial vehicles. Financial commentators noted the company's financial structure was "rather complicated".

The new company wanted to emulate the success of the Ford Model T and exhibited its first car at the 1919 Motor Show. Its initial models were two- and four-seat tourers and coupés with prices starting from £425. By early 1920 the company was making 80 chassis a week and Bean's Dudley plant could not produce enough bodies, so it ordered 2,000 bodies from Handley Page of Cricklewood. In 1920 2,000 Bean cars were made.

But prices and wages soared and the car industry had entered recession. The Harper Bean conglomerate disbanded and the company ran up debts of £475,000 to its suppliers. It stopped production in October 1920 and Jack Bean resigned from the company a month later.

=== Revival ===
In November 1921 Sir George Bean, Barclays Bank, the National Provincial Bank and Hadfields rescued the company with a huge sum by buying a controlling interest in A Harper, Sons & Bean and paid off its creditors. Production resumed early in 1922 and the company was making 100 cars a week by August.

In October 1923 the company launched a new and much improved model, the Bean 14, with a 2.3-litre engine and a four-speed gearbox. About 4,000 of all the variants were made up to 1929. The car sold well, particularly in Australia. In 1924 the company launched a smaller Bean 12 and also began making light commercial vehicles. Also in 1924 Sir George Bean died aged 68 and was succeeded as chairman by Major Augustus Clerke who had previously been managing director of Hadfields.

But A Harper, Sons & Bean was still short of money with debts of £1.8 million, mainly as a result of its restructuring in 1921. Hadfields again rescued the company, The same models were made but there were changes in management with Jack Bean leaving the company and moving to another Wolverhampton manufacturer, Guy Motors.

From 1922 Bean supplied engines for a light car, the Ariel Nine, which was made in Coventry. It was a water-cooled side-valve flat twin engine with "square" dimensions of 85 mm bore and 85 mm stroke, giving it 997 cc displacement. However, the engine was vibratory and noisy, so in 1924 Ariel discontinued the model.

Bean launched a new model, the 18/50, with a 2.7-litre six-cylinder Meadows overhead valve engine. It was in production for only a year, in which time 500 were made. In chassis form it cost £365. Some Bean factories were sold with production concentrated at its Tipton site. From 1927 all cars were branded Hadfield-Beans, and the 14 was updated to become the 2300 cc 14/40, still using the Bean engine.

=== Bean commercial vehicles ===
In November 1924, partly to maintain production volumes, Bean added a 20/25 cwt lorry to its range. It made commercial vehicles from then until 1931, concentrating on the lighter end of the market. The original truck was based on a Bean car, but in 1927 the company launched a larger model with a commercial chassis and a capacity of 30 cwt (about 1,500 kg). Unfortunately for Bean, Morris Commercial entered the market at the same time: intense competition drove most other competitors out of the UK market. Bean's finances suffered, despite ongoing funding from Hadfields.

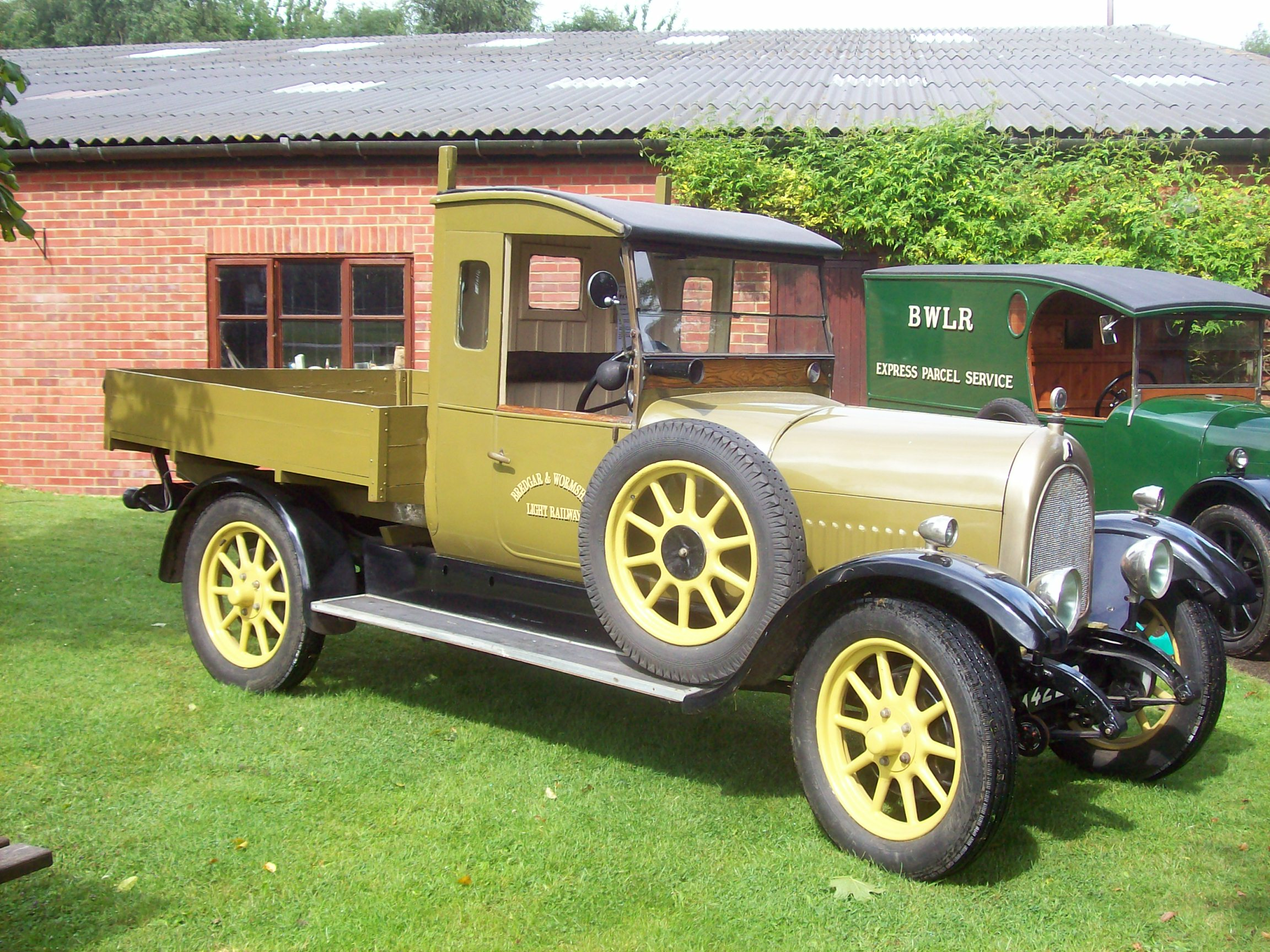
1926 Bean 14 HP pickup truck

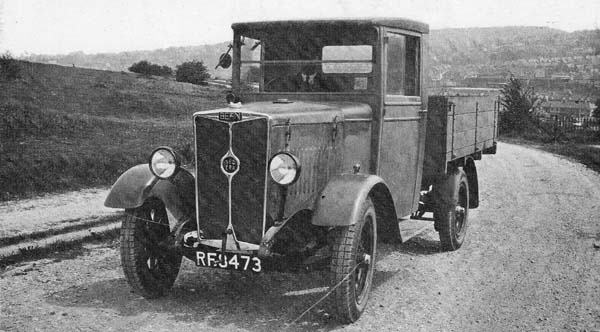
1931 Bean New Era truck

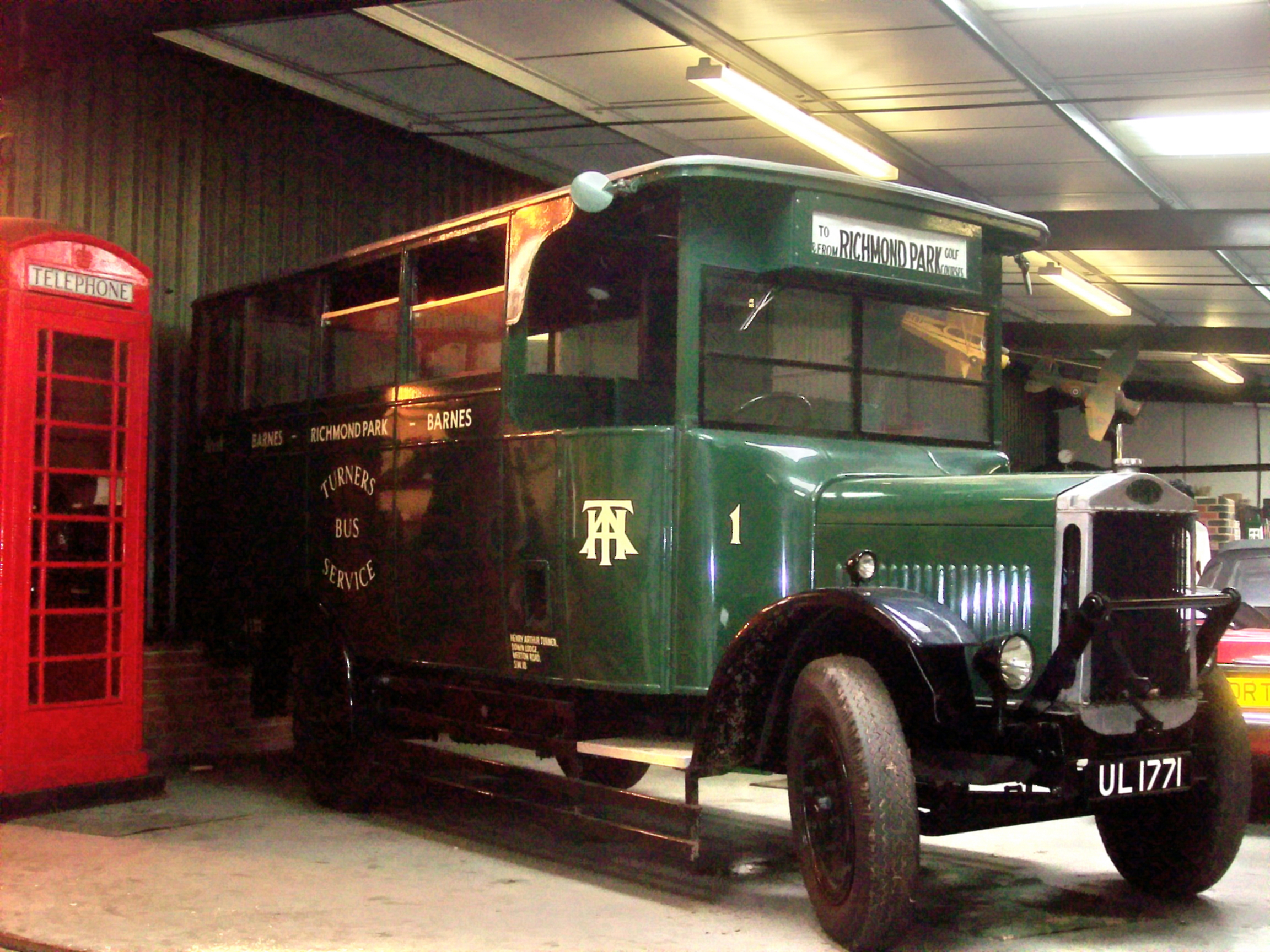
1929 bus built by Birch Brothers of London on a Bean 30 cwt chassis

=== Later years ===
In 1927 Hadfields made a number of changes to the Bean range. Production of the Bean 12 ended with about 3,000 built in total. The Bean 14 became the Long 14, and a Short 14 was introduced. This was a Bean 12 chassis, powered by a 14 engine. Hadfields discontinued Long 14 in 1928.

In 1928 Hadfield launched Hadfield-Bean 14/45, which severely damaged the company's reputation. It also offered a sporting variant, the 14/70. The new models were not properly tested and went on sale with a number of serious faults. This led to a significant drop in sales and Hadfields ended Bean car production in 1929. Commercial vehicle production continued until June 1931, when Bean stopped making vehicles and entered voluntary liquidation.

Hadfields relaunched Bean in 1933 as Beans Industries to make castings for the motor industry. The company became profitable again and in 1937 Beans Industries became a public company. In World War Two the company made truck engines and parts. Standard-Triumph took over Bean in 1956 and became part of Leyland Motors in 1960. In the 1980s the Margaret Thatcher in her third ministry broke up British Leyland and in 1988 Bean was bought by its management team. The team also bought Reliant, which failed in 1995 and forced Bean into receivership. A German company, Eisenwerk Bruhl, bought the Tipton factory and renamed it as Bruhl (UK). The owners sold it to the directors and it became Ferrotech, which was a major supplier to Ford and Perkins Engines. The order book almost doubled in twelve months but appalling mismanagement led to increasing and unsustainable losses, the company was put in administration and as the administrators could not sell it as a going concern the factory ceased production in August 2005 and closed within six months.

== Record breakers ==
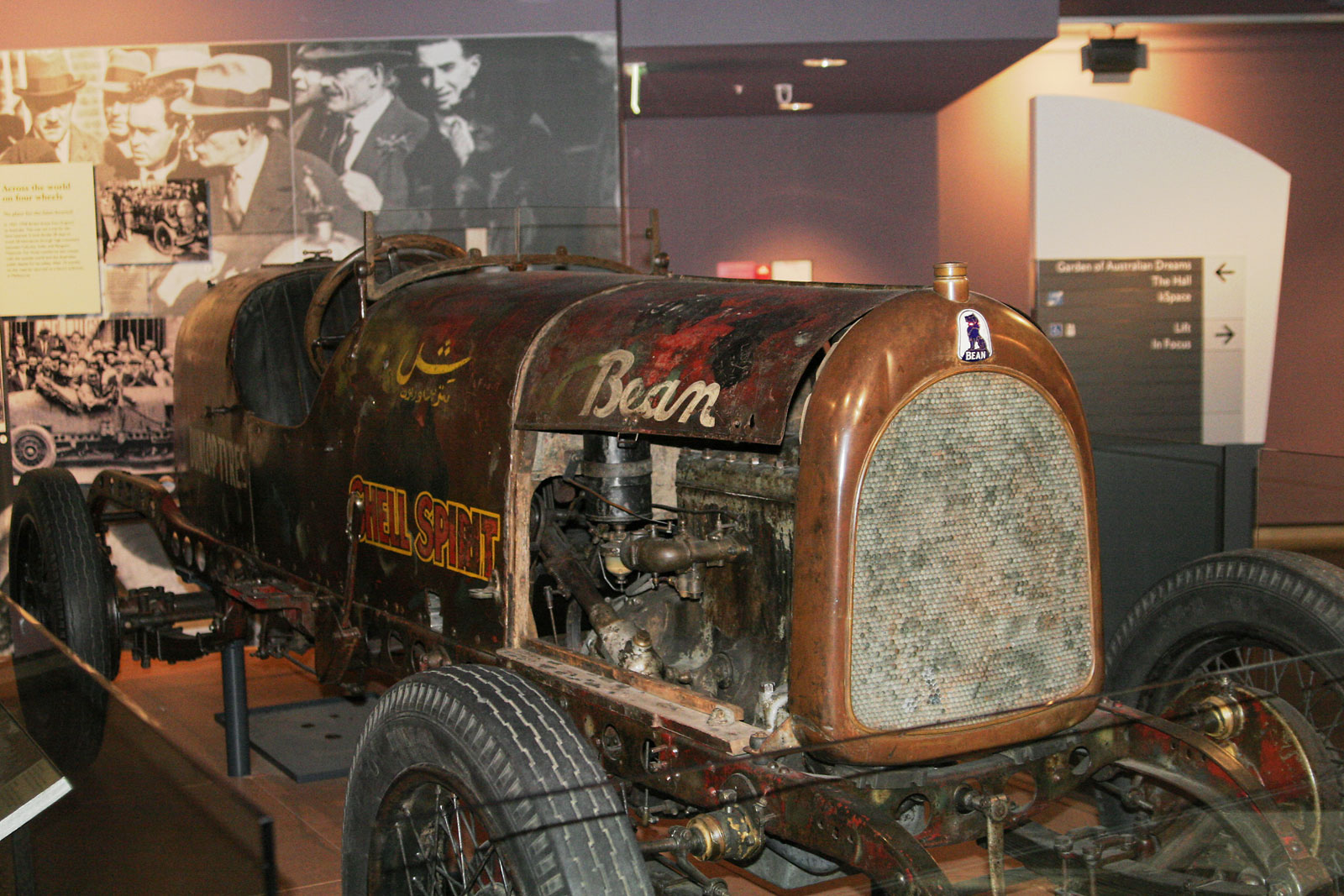
Francis Birtles' record-breaking Bean 14 HP Sundowner

Australian adventurer Francis Birtles made a number of epic and record-breaking journeys in a two-seat Bean 14 HP called the Sundowner. In September 1926 Birtles and co-driver Alec Barlow drove it 3,400 miles (5,500 km) from Darwin to Melbourne. The next month they drove it back in a record eight and a half days. Then from October 1927 to July 1928 Birtles drove the car solo 16,000 miles (26,000 km) from London to Melbourne.

The Coseley factory also made Captain George Eyston's world-land-speed-record car Thunderbolt, which took the record in 1937.

== Factories ==
The Dudley factory still exists as part of an unconnected private business. The Coseley factory made automotive parts supplier until Ferrotech was forced to close it in 2005. It was demolished three years later. The newer part of the factory site in Coseley / Tipton that was built in Bean's years as a parts supplier was sold and demolished in 2003–04, and the land redeveloped for housing within a few months. One of the streets on this new estate, Thunderbolt Way, is named after Eyston's record-breaking car.

On moving to the Coseley site, Bean built a block of offices on Sedgley Road West on the Tipton side of the boundary with Coseley. Tipton Council bought them and opened them as their municipal offices on 7 March 1935, a use which lasted for the next 31 years until Tipton council was abolished and the bulk of the town was placed under control of West Bromwich Council. Dudley College used the building until 1993, since when it has since been used by a number of different ventures.

The residential street Bean Road (Dudley DY2) has long existed within 200 yards (180 m) of the Dudley factory, while Bean Road (Coseley) gives access to the former Coseley factory site, and the nearby Bean Drive is a cul-de-sac off Thunderbolt Way in Tipton.

== Main car models ==
Type	Model	Year	Number made	Engine	Notes
11.9	1 (1919–22), 2 (1923–24), 4 (1924–27)	1919–27	10,000	1796 cc four cylinder	Later called the 12
14	3 (later the Long 14), 6 (Short 14)	1924–28	4000 (all 14s)	2300 cc four-cylinder	Became the model 8 14/40 in 1928
18/50	7	1926–28	500	2692 cc Meadows six-cylinder	
14/45	8	1928–29	see 14	2300 cc four-cylinder	Updated 14, branded as a Hadfield-Bean
14/70	8	1928–29	see 14	2300 cc four-cylinder	Sports version of the 14/45

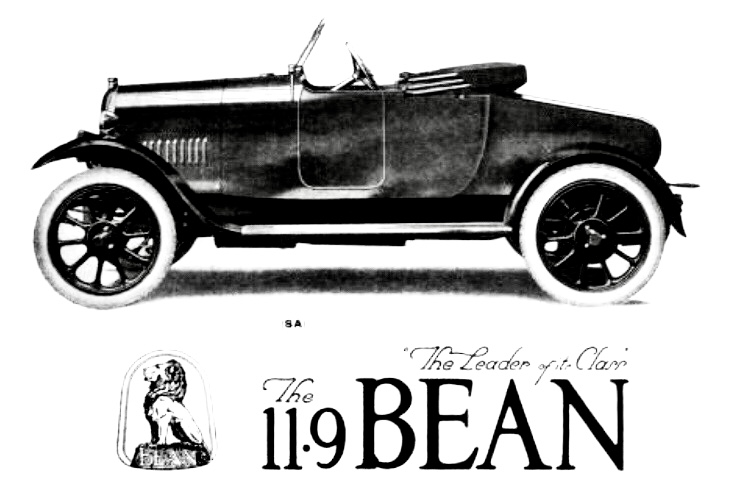
Bean 11.9 (1919-1924)

== Survivors ==
A 1927 Bean 14 coupé was in the Museum of Science and Industry, Birmingham until it closed in 1997. The car is now in Birmingham Museum and Art Gallery's Dollman Street store, which is only occasionally open to the public. The Black Country Living Museum has a 1926 20/25 HP truck as a static exhibit. The National Motor Museum, Beaulieu has a 1928 Short 14 car as a static exhibit. The Bredgar and Wormshill Light Railway in Kent has had a number of Bean vehicles, including a 1923 14 HP Open Tourer that is driven to historic vehicle events both in the UK and overseas. Francis Birtles' record-breaking Bean 14 Sundowner is in the National Museum of Australia. A number of Bean vehicles, most of them 12 HP and 14 HP cars, survive and are driven in private ownership. It is thought about 500 of the six cylindered 18-50 Beans were produced and today around 20 of those are thought to survive. Two are in the UK and a number in Australia.

== See also ==
- List of car manufacturers of the United Kingdom
