= Perry (car) =

The Perry was a British car made by the Perry Motor Company based in Tyseley, Birmingham who made cars between 1913 and 1916.

== History ==
The company can trace its roots back to 1824 with James and Stephen Perry making pens in a workshop in London, later moving to Birmingham and building bicycles. By the late 1890s they were having financial problems and were bought by James William Bayliss, part owner of the Bayliss-Thomas car making company.

Their first car, a three-wheeler, was made in 1899 followed by a forecar in 1903. Cecil Bayliss, the son of the new owner, built a cyclecar in 1911 with an 800 cc Fafnir engine, and this was developed into the first Perry car to reach production.

== Perry 8hp ==
Perry 8

Overview
- Manufacturer: Perry Motor Company
- Production: 1912–1915 approx 800 made
- Designer: Cecil Bayliss

Body and chassis
- Class: cyclecar
- Body style: two-seat open with optional dickey seat.

Powertrain
- Engine: Perry twin-cylinder 875 cc
- Transmission: 3-speed manual

Dimensions
- Wheelbase: 84 or 90 inches (2132 or 2284 mm)
- Length: 123 inches (3124 mm)
- Width: 56 inches (1422 mm)

Chronology
- Successor: none

The Perry cyclecar was described as 'just placed on the market' when exhibited at the November 1912 Motor Cycle and Cycle Car Show at Olympia. It was described as 'an exact replica of a full-sized model, but is of exceptionally light weight - less than 7cwt'.

The engine for the car was built in-house and was a twin-cylinder vertical water cooled unit, with 72 mm (2.83 in) bore and 108 mm (4.25 in) stroke, unusual in that both pistons rose and fell at the same time. Drive was to the rear wheels through a 3-speed gearbox with reverse and worm-driven axle and spur differential. The rear springing was unusual in that the long semi-elliptic leaf springs were supplemented by coil springs. It was fitted with Sankey detachable wheels and Dunlop tyres.

The basic body was an open two-seater, but a long-wheelbase version allowing a dickey seat was also available.

About 800 were made.

== Perry 11.9 ==
Perry 11.9

Overview
- Manufacturer: Perry Motor Company
- Production: 1914–1915 approx 300 made
- Designer: Cecil Bayliss

Body and chassis
- Body style: two- or four-seat open with optional dickey seat.

Powertrain
- Engine: Perry 4-cylinder 1795 cc
- Transmission: 3-speed manual

Dimensions
- Wheelbase: 102 inches (2591 mm)
- Length: 157.5 inches (4000 mm)
- Width: 62 inches (1575 mm)

Chronology
- Successor: Bean 11.9

A full-sized car was introduced in 1914 with four-cylinder 1795 cc engine with a 69 mm (2.72 in) bore and 120 mm (4.72 in) stroke. The larger car allowed four seat bodies to be offered as well as two seaters and these were mainly made by Mulliners of Birmingham.

About 300 were made before World War I curtailed car-building activities. A very few were made in 1919 when the design, jigs, patterns and tools were sold to Bean Cars for £15,000, who reintroduced it as the Bean 11.9.

== See also ==
- List of car manufacturers of the United Kingdom
