= Swift Motor Company =

English automobile manufacturer

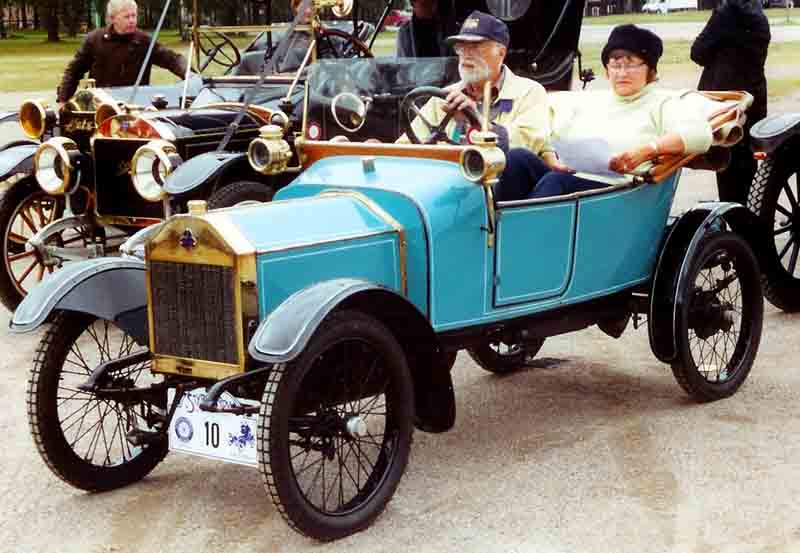
Swift 7 HP 1912

The Swift Motor Company made Swift Cars in Coventry, England from 1900 until 1931. It grew progressively from James Starley's Coventry Sewing Machine Company, via bicycle and motorised cycle manufacture. The cars ranged from a single-cylinder car in 1900 using an MMC engine, through a Swift-engined twin-cylinder 7-horsepower light car in 1904, and a 3-litre model in 1913. After the First World War a successful range was sold during the 1920s, but the Cadet of 1930 was its last vehicle as it could not compete economically with volume manufacturers such as Ford and Morris Motors.

== History ==
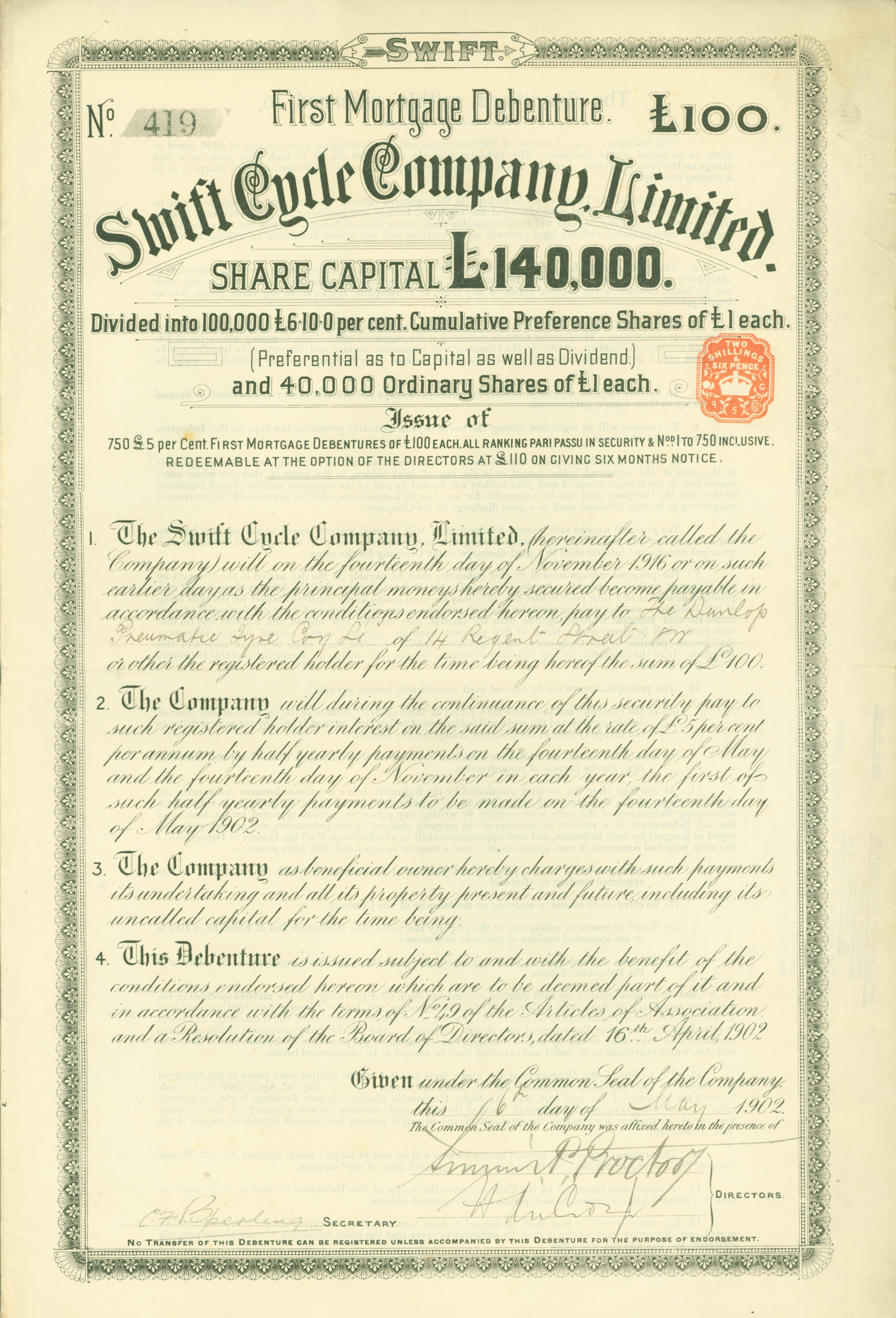
Debentur certificate of the Swift Cycle Company Ltd., issued 6 May 1902

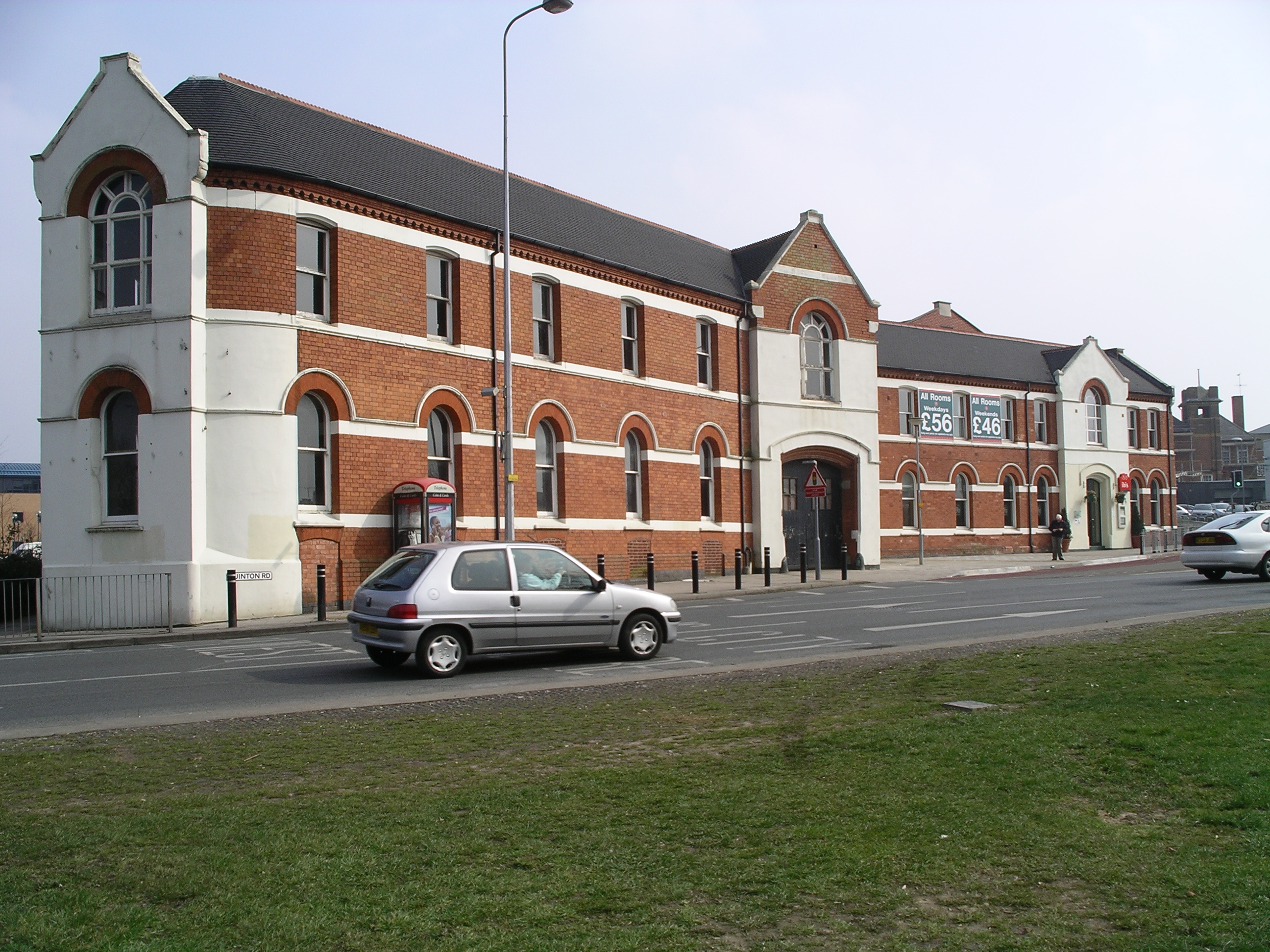
The former Quinton Works, Cheylesmore, Coventry

The Coventry Sewing Machine Company was founded by James Starley in 1859. It started making bicycles in 1869 and changed the name to Coventry Machinists Company. In 1896 it became the Swift Cycle Company and started to make motorcycles in 1898, and experimenting with an early car in 1900. In 1902 a separate company was formed for motor vehicle production and registered as the Swift Motor Company.

After World War 1 ended, the Cycle Car company was merged with the main company as Swift of Coventry and the range was simplified.

In 1919, A Harper Bean & Sons, who also made Bean Cars, bought 50% of Swift's ordinary shares, but got into severe financial difficulties later that year, seriously affecting the company's finances.

The last Swift car was the 1930 Cadet. Swift was too small to compete with the likes of Ford and Morris, and closed in 1931 after its suppliers foreclosed on its debts. Coventry Climax was left with a number of engines from the Cadet model, which it used as the basis of its Second World War fire pump engine designated FSM, the SM standing for Swift Motors.

Production was originally in the Cheylesmore Works but in 1906 car assembly moved to a new factory, Quinton Works in Mile Lane. Some of the cars were equipped with engines manufactured in Saint-Denis Paris by Aster in single, twin or four cylinder configurations.

== Cycles and Motorcycles ==
In 1869, 'Coventry Machinists' started making bicycles and in 1896 it became the 'Swift Cycle Company'. In 1898 it started making motorcycles.

== Voiturettes ==
Swift made its first single-cylinder car in 1900 using an MMC engine. It had an unusual transmission system involving an unsprung two ratio rear axle. The Swift voiturettes, described in the Automotor Journal of 1902, were modified in 1903 to include a reverse gear.

== Cyclecars ==
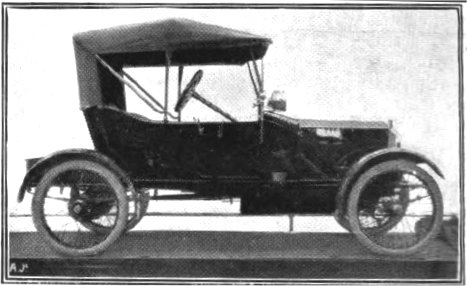
1912 Swift Cyclecar

The Swift cycle car at the 1912 Olympia Motor Cycle and Cycle Car Show was described as a true motor car on a small scale (but for the fact it was constructed of weldless steel tubing). The twin cylinder vertical water-cooled engine was said to resemble just two cylinders of the 13.9 hp Swift standard model, and with a bore of 75 mm and stroke of 110 mm, it had a capacity of 970 cc and rating of 7-horsepower. The gearbox operated by gated change offered three forward speeds and reverse.

The 1914 model was exhibited at the 1913 Olympia show, the company still named Swift Cycle Co Ltd, at which time its price was £140 'fully equipped'. For 1914 the car changed over to steel channel frame carried on four semi-elliptic leaf springs. The car had worm and sector steering, and the brakes comprised a pedal operated transmission brake and two hand-lever operated external contracting brakes. The two-seater body had the seats slightly staggered, and the specification included the hood, adjustable windscreen, a boot, mudguards, running boards, and an acetylene lighting set. The engine remained at 970 cc and was fitted with an Eisemann magneto and Claudel carburettor. The clutch was a leather lined cone type fitted into the external flywheel. The petrol tank was placed behind the dashboard and fed the carburettor by gravity.

After World War 1 the Cycle Car company was merged with the main car company as Swift of Coventry.

== Swift Cars ==
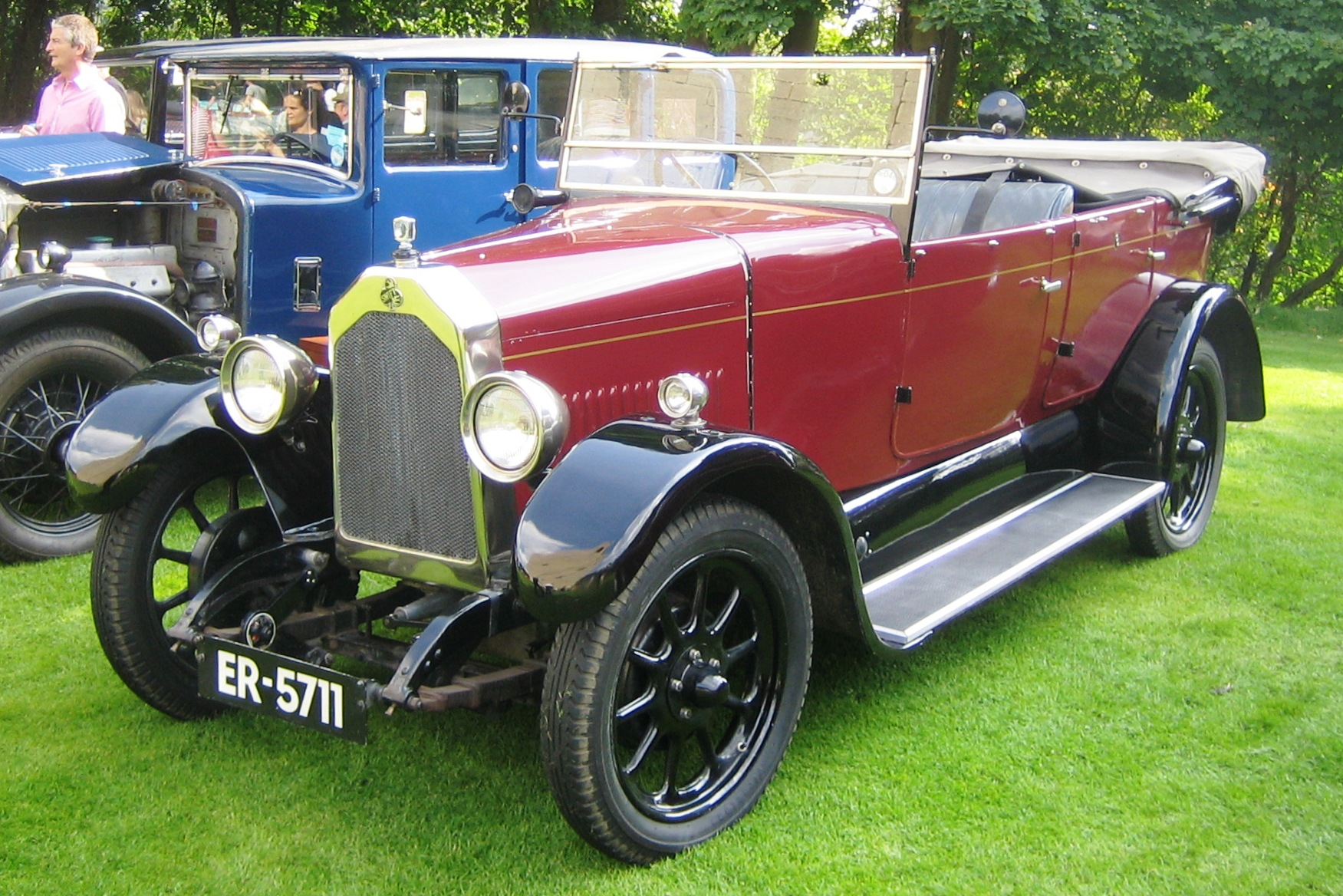
1926 Swift 14/40 Tourer, UK license "ER 5711", chassis 3753

The first Swift car of the conventional type was the twin-cylinder 7-horsepower, later 10-horsepower, of 1904. This was shortly afterwards joined by the four-cylinder 12/14, which continued in a bewildering number of guises until the First World War. These cars were entirely built at the Swift works, with the exception of the engines which were built in Coventry by Messrs White and Poppe.

In 1904, the Swift Cycle Company Ltd. made a single-cylinder 700 cc car (possibly a voiturette) which had a cloverleaf emblem on its radiator, an emblem that was adopted by all the cars. In the years 1909–11 another single-cylinder 7-horsepower car was manufactured, this time with 1100 cc (105 mm bore and 127 mm stroke). This car was also sold by Austin as the first Austin 7.

A larger car, the 15, with a 3-litre engine was added to the range in 1913, and this continued to just post-war. During the First World War, car production ceased.

After the war ended, the Cycle Car company was merged with the main company as Swift of Coventry. A Harper Bean & Sons, who also made Bean Cars, bought 50% of Swift's ordinary shares in 1919, but got into severe financial difficulties later that year, seriously affecting the company's finances.

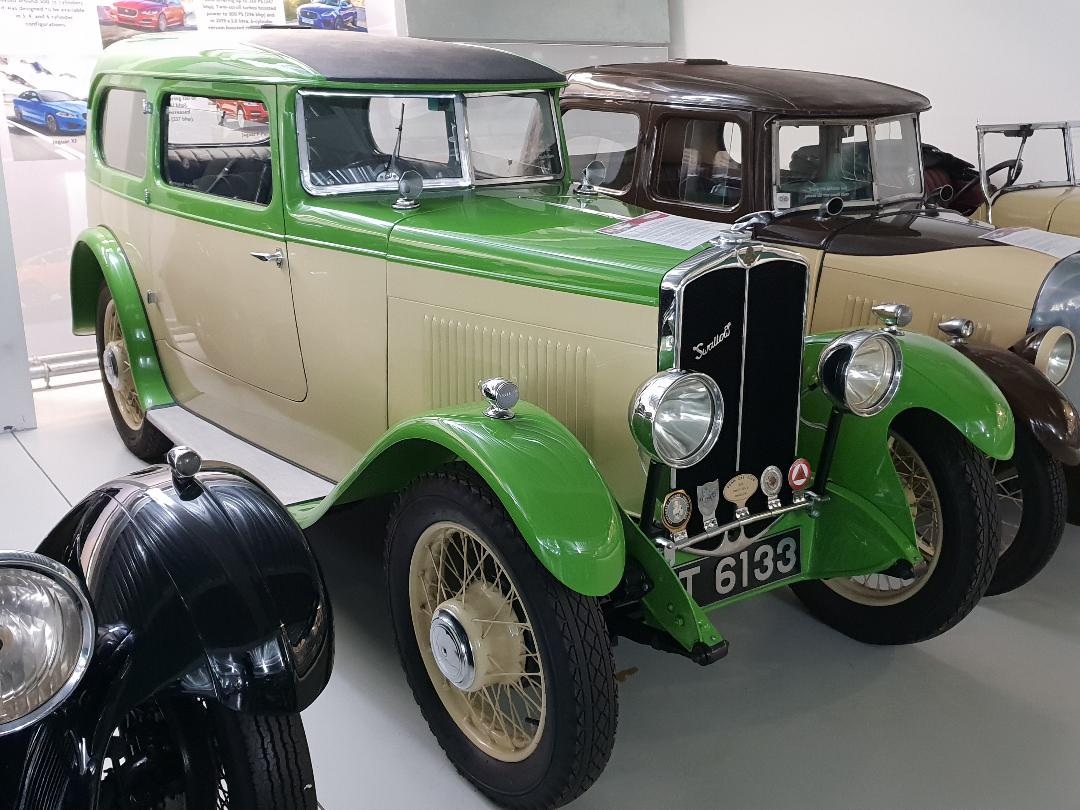
1931 Swift Ten with Swallow body, since 2001 in the Jaguar Heritage Trust at the British Motor Museum.

The Swift range was simplified with the excellent 1100 cc 10 continuing and joined by a 2-litre 12 with a 4-speed gearbox. A new 10 was launched in 1923 as the Q type with coil ignition, electric starting, optional front wheel brakes and a top speed of 55 mph (90 km/h). Standard front wheel brakes were added in 1926 and the engine was bored out to 1190 cc to become the P type. The engine grew again to 1307 cc in 1929 when the car became the P2.

From 1924 Swift supplied Q type engines for the Ariel Ten light car. This model continued until 1925, when Ariel ceased making cars to concentrate on motorcycles.

In 1925 the Swift 12 was replaced by the 12/35 with front wheel brakes, plate clutch plus an increase of 24 inches (610 mm) in the wheelbase.

The last Swift car was the 1930 Cadet, which was an attempt to compete with the £100 cars. This had an 850 cc Coventry Climax engine and a price of £149 for the tourer and £165 for the saloon. But Swift was too small to compete with the likes of Ford and Morris and closed in 1931 after its suppliers foreclosed on its debts. Coventry Climax was left with a number of engines for the Cadet model, which it used as the basis of its Second World War fire pump engine designated FSM, the SM standing for Swift Motors.

== Principal Swift cars ==
Year	Type	Engine	Production
1904-8	7/8	905 cc side-valve two-cylinder	
1904–1907	9/10	1399 cc side-valve 2-cylinder	
1904–1907	12/14	1348 cc side-valve 3-cylinder	
1909–1911	7	1100 cc side-valve single-cylinder	
1905	9	1703 cc side-valve 2-cylinder	
1905–1907	16	2672 or 2799 cc side-valve 4-cylinder	
1908–1912	10/12	1560 or 1778 cc side-valve 2-cylinder	
1908–1912	15/18	3119, 2308 or 2724 cc side-valve 4-cylinder	
1908	25/30	4942 cc side-valve 4-cylinder	
1909	18/20	3556 cc side-valve 4-cylinder	
1912–1914	8 hp	1362 or 1526 cc side-valve 4-cylinder	
1913–1914	15 and 16/20	3052 cc side-valve 4-cylinder	
1913–1914	10	1328 cc side-valve 4-cylinder	
1913–1924	12 (12/35 from 1925)	1940 cc side-valve 4-cylinder	approx 1500
1914–1915	11.9	1795 cc side-valve 4-cylinder	
1914–1915	15.9	2610 cc side-valve 4-cylinder	
1915–1922	10 ED	1122 cc side-valve 4-cylinder	approx 1500
1915–1930	15	2938 cc side-valve 4-cylinder	
1922–1927	Ten (Q-Type, QA from 1925)	1097 cc side-valve 4-cylinder	approx 4500
1924	18/50	2951 cc side-valve 4-cylinder	prototype only
1925–1930	14/40	1954 cc side-valve 4-cylinder	
1926–1931	P-Type (2P from 1928, 3P from 1929, 4P from 1930 and 5P in 1931)	1190 cc side-valve 4-cylinder	
1930-31	Cadet	847 cc Coventry Climax side-valve 4-cylinder	approx 250

== Quinton Works ==
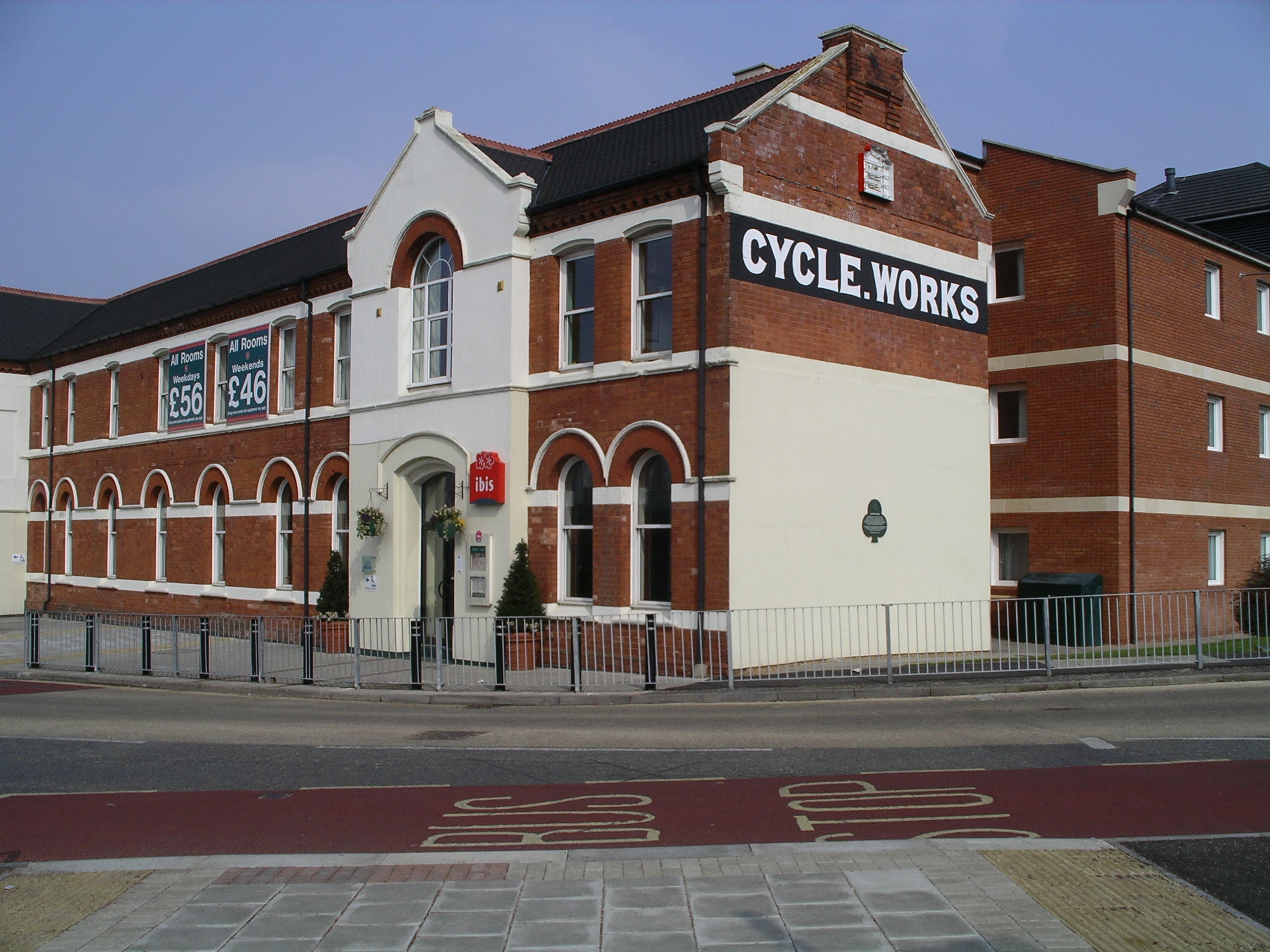
The former Quinton Works (side view)

The Quinton Works with frontages on Quinton Road and Mile Lane in Cheylesmore, Coventry, originally built in 1890 for S & B Gorton for cycle manufacture, was acquired in 1905 by the Swift Motor Company, who made a motorcycle and a motor tricycle in 1898, and a conventional car by 1901 in its Cheylesmore Works in Little Park Street, but needed more factory space. The frontages of the Quinton Works have been preserved and the building is now used as a hotel.

== See also ==
- List of car manufacturers of the United Kingdom
