= Birtle =

Birtle may refer to:

- Birtle, Greater Manchester, England
- Birtle Indian Residential School
- Birtle, Manitoba, Canada
- Birtle (electoral district)
- Rural Municipality of Birtle
