= Fred Birtles =

English footballer

Personal information
- Full name: Fred Birtles
- Date of birth: 6 April 1903
- Place of birth: Stockport, England
- Date of death: 1985 (aged 81–82)
- Position: Inside forward

Senior career*
Years	Team	Apps	(Gls)
1922–1925	Crewe Alexandra	28	(8)
1925–1926	Hartlepools United	15	(6)
1926–1928	Crewe Alexandra	52	(13)
1928–1929	Chester		
1929–1932	Altrincham		
1932–1933	Stalybridge Celtic		
1933	Mossley		
Total		95	(27)
- * Club domestic league appearances and goals

Fred Birtles (6 April 1903 – 1985) was an English footballer who played in the Football League for Crewe Alexandra and Hartlepools United.
