= Francis Birtles =

Australian adventurer (1881–1941)

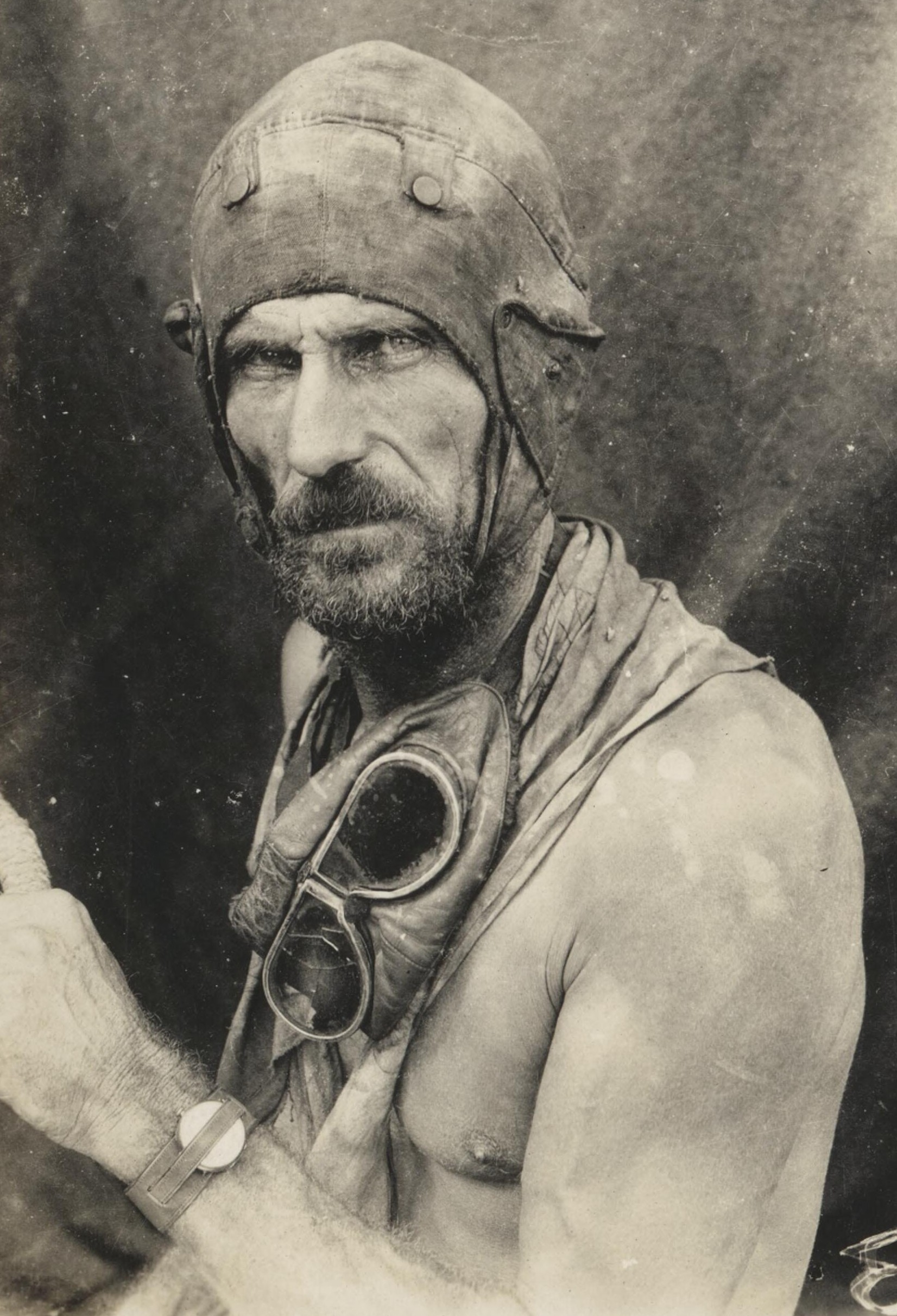
Birtles in Arnhem Land

Francis Edwin Birtles (7 November 1881 in Fitzroy, Victoria – 1 July 1941 in Croydon, New South Wales) was an Australian adventurer, photographer, cyclist, and filmmaker, who set many long-distance cycling and driving records, including becoming in 1927 the first man to drive a car from England to Australia. Birtles had set a speed record driving from Darwin to Melbourne the previous year.

== Life and career ==
Birtles was the third child of David Edwin Birtles, an English bootmaker, and Sarah Jane Bartlett. At the age of 15, Birtles joined the merchant navy as an apprentice, but after the outbreak of the Second Boer War, he jumped ship at Cape Town, Cape Colony in 1899, in an attempt to enlist with Australian militia. However, he was attached to the Field Intelligence Department as part of a troop of irregular mounted infantry until May 1902. After a brief period back in Australia, Birtles joined the constabulary in the a mounted police officer in the Transvaal, until his police service ended when he contracted blackwater fever.

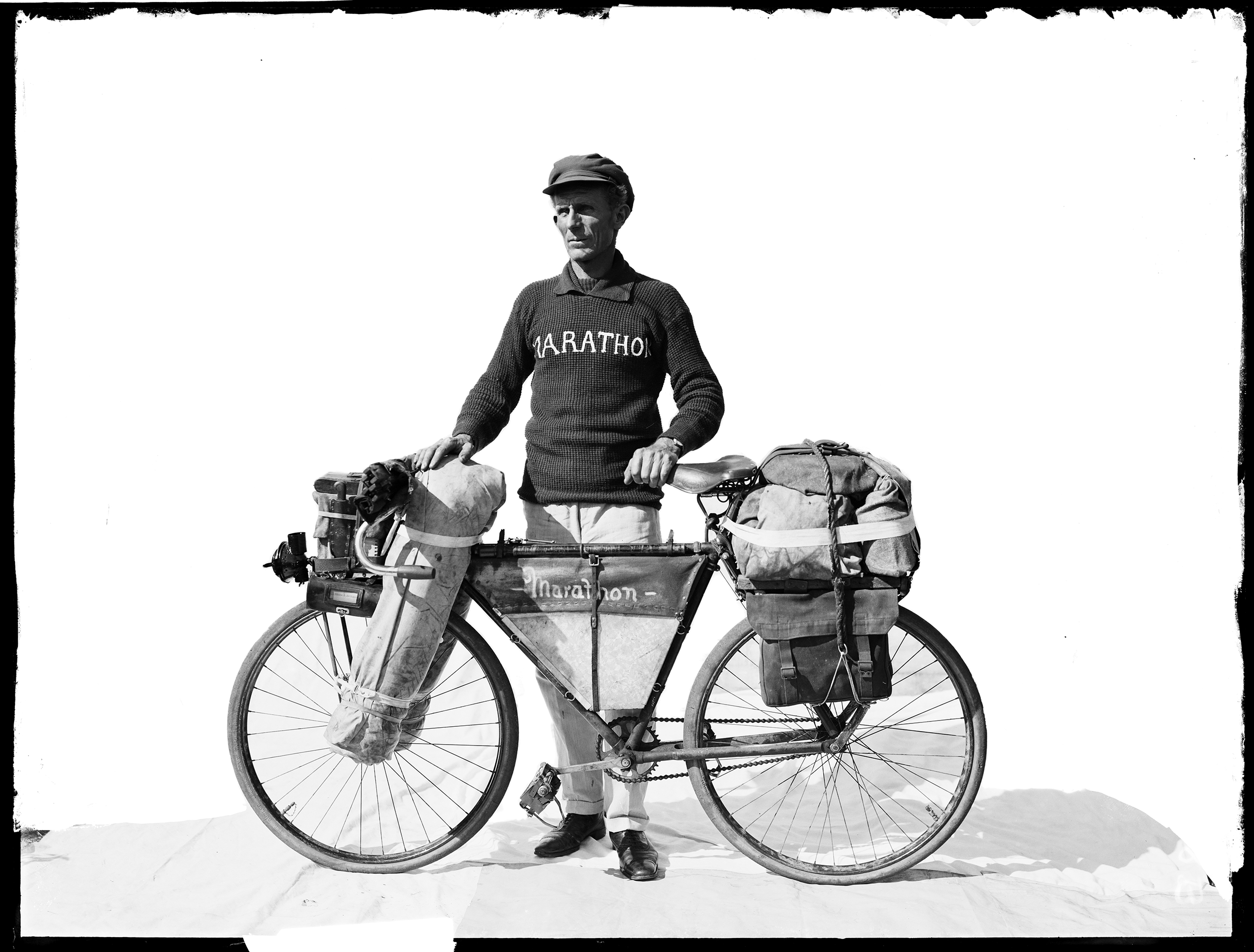
Francis Birtles with bicycle loaded for marathon cross-country ride, ca. 1920

Birtles returned to Fremantle, Western Australia, and on 26 December 1905 left to cycle to Melbourne, an achievement which attracted widespread attention as it was the first west to east bicycle crossing of the country. After a short stretch as a lithographic artist, in 1907–08, he cycled to Sydney and then, via Brisbane, Normanton, Darwin, Alice Springs and Adelaide back to Sydney, where he based himself. In 1909 he published the story of his feat, "Lonely Lands", which he illustrated with his own photographs. That year he also set a new cycling record for the Fremantle to Sydney continental crossing. In 1910–11 he rode around Australia. In 1911, he was accompanied from Sydney to Darwin by R. Primmer, cameraman for Gaumont. The resulting film "Across Australia" was released the next year. Birtles had continued on to Broome and Perth, then broke his previous records by riding from Fremantle to Sydney in thirty-one days. By 1912, he had cycled around Australia twice and had crossed the continent seven times.

In 1912, he became one of the first people to make a west to east crossing by car from Fremantle to Sydney in a Brush Runabout with driver Syd Ferguson.

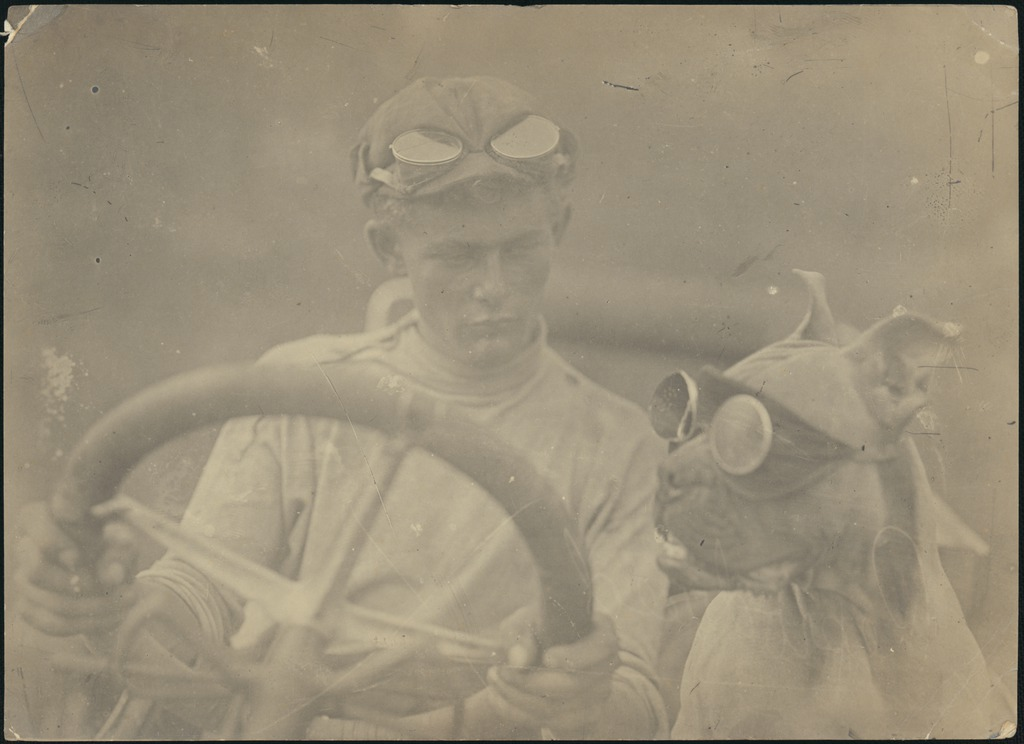
Clive Birtles at the wheel of the car with the dog, Wowser. c.1915

On 21 September 1912 Birtles with his brother Clive and bulldog 'Wowser' left Melbourne in a blue 20 hp Flanders touring car to drive to Sydney, Brisbane, Charters Towers and then to the Gulf of Carpentaria. From the Gulf he drove close to the Northern Territory border and he arrived back in Melbourne in January 1913.

On Saturday, 13 February 1915 Birtles left Sydney for a six-month-long motoring tour following Burke and Wills' track. Birtles took a movie camera and made a cinematographic record of the journey. Birtles reached Broken Hill on 25 February and Adelaide on 1 March, where he spent two weeks recovering from an illness, before driving to Burra, Port Augusta, Quorn, and Maree to Cooper Creek. Birtles reached Normanton on Saturday, 5 June 1915, and then drove to Melbourne via Cape York, Einasleigh, Hughenden, Tambo, Roma, Toowoomba, and Brisbane, arriving in Melbourne at the end of September 1915 having covered 7,000 miles in seven months. He then drove from Melbourne to Swan Hill and Menindee to finish the movie of the Burke and Wills' track. The film was called 'Across Australia: In the Tracks of Burke and Wills' and was released by The Co-Operative Film Exchange Ltd of Melbourne, and opened in Melbourne at Hoyt's Olympia Theatre on Christmas Day 1915.

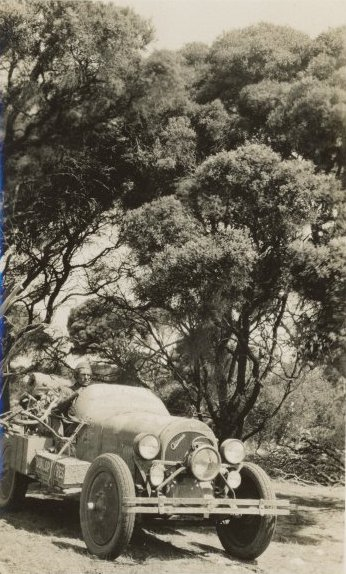
Birtles' Oldsmobile 30 used for the Darwin to Adelaide overland speed record trip 1924

As a publicity stunt, Birtles was commissioned by Barlow Motors, the Melbourne agent for the Bean cars, to drive a modified Bean 14 car from Darwin to Melbourne. In addition to the Bean sponsorship, Birtles' fuel was provided by the British Imperial Oil Company, the Castrol was provided by Sir Charles Wakefield, and the tyres were provided by Dunlop Rubber. With his co-driver Alec Barlow, they left Darwin at 4 am on 23 October 1926 and completed the 5,440 km (3,380 mi) journey in eight days and 13 hours, a record. The car was dubbed the Sundowner.

Following this success, Birtles was asked to make an attempt at becoming the first person to drive from England to Australia. He departed from Australia House in London on 19 October 1927, farewelled by a crowd of wellwishers including the 1927 Miss Australia. In an era when there were few roads and gasoline supplies sparse, the epic eight-month journey carried him across mountains, deserts and through tropical jungles and included a number of sea voyages – the last being from Singapore to Darwin. He travelled via Europe, Egypt, Persia (now Iran), India, Burma and Malaya.

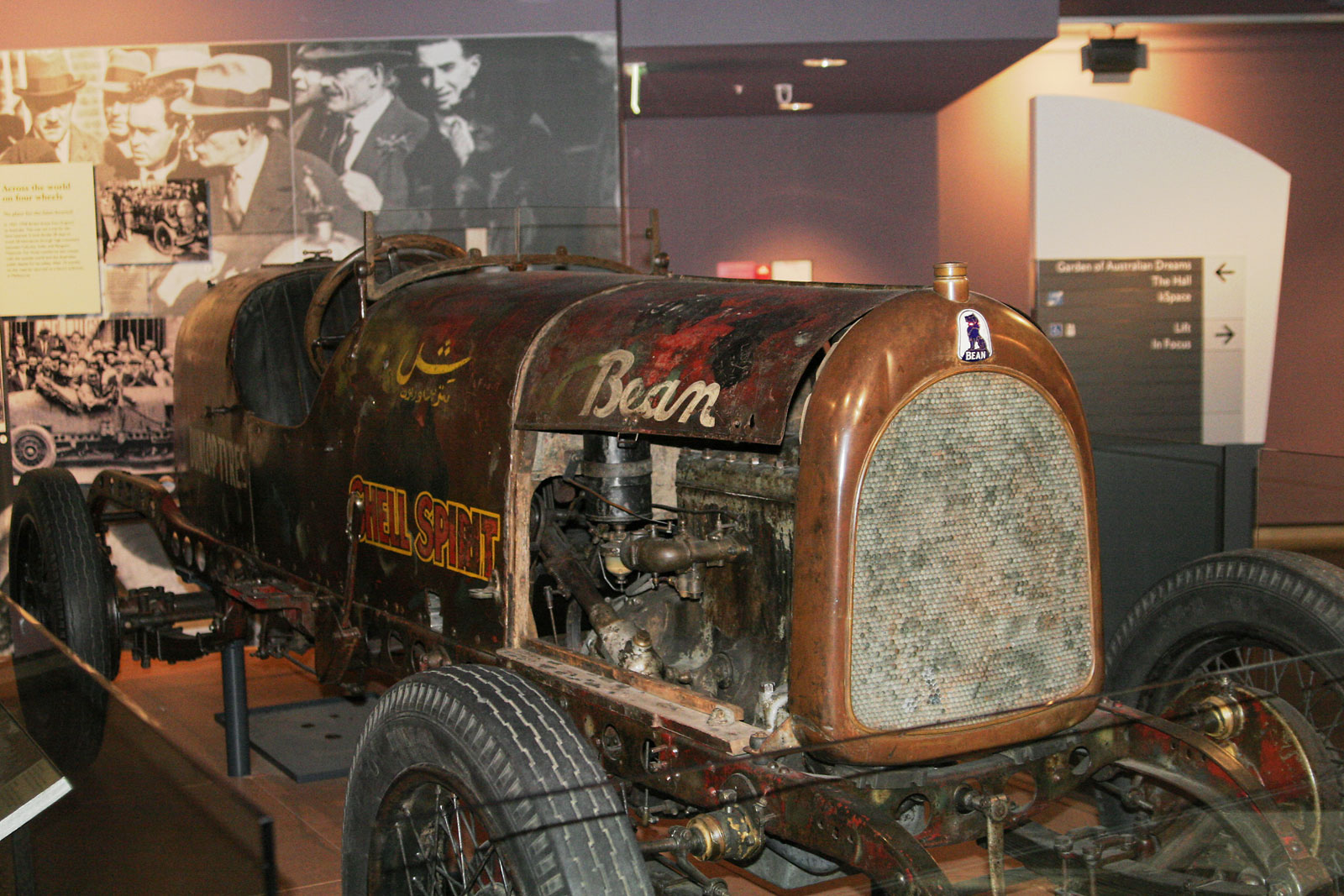
Sundowner, the record breaking Bean 14.

On arrival in Darwin, his car was seized by customs officials demanding import duty, until direct intervention by the Prime Minister Stanley Bruce averted the situation. He continued south via Brisbane and Sydney to the official finishing point of the journey at the General Post Office on Elizabeth Street, Melbourne on 25 July 1928. He was promptly asked to move on by a policeman for obstructing traffic.

The journey was not repeated until 1955.

Birtles had completed more than 70 transcontinental crossings of Australia by mid-1927, details of which were described in his book Battle Fronts of Outback (1935).

In 1929, the Bean car was presented to the Australian Government on condition that it be placed in the national museum. As there was no such museum at the time, the car disappeared for many years before being recovered in the 1960s and placed into the National Motor Museum in Adelaide in 1980 before moving to the National Historical Collection in the National Museum of Australia in Canberra in 2001.

In 1933, Birtles travelled to Arnhem Land with a prospecting and mining expedition in search of gold, after having found some several years previously during one of his journeys. He subsequently sold his share in the mining stake and retired a wealthy man.

Birtles also made several films of his encounters with the outback and Indigenous Australians including Across Australia with Francis Birtles (1912), Into Australia's Unknown (1914) and Coorab in the Island of Ghosts (1929).

== Personal life ==
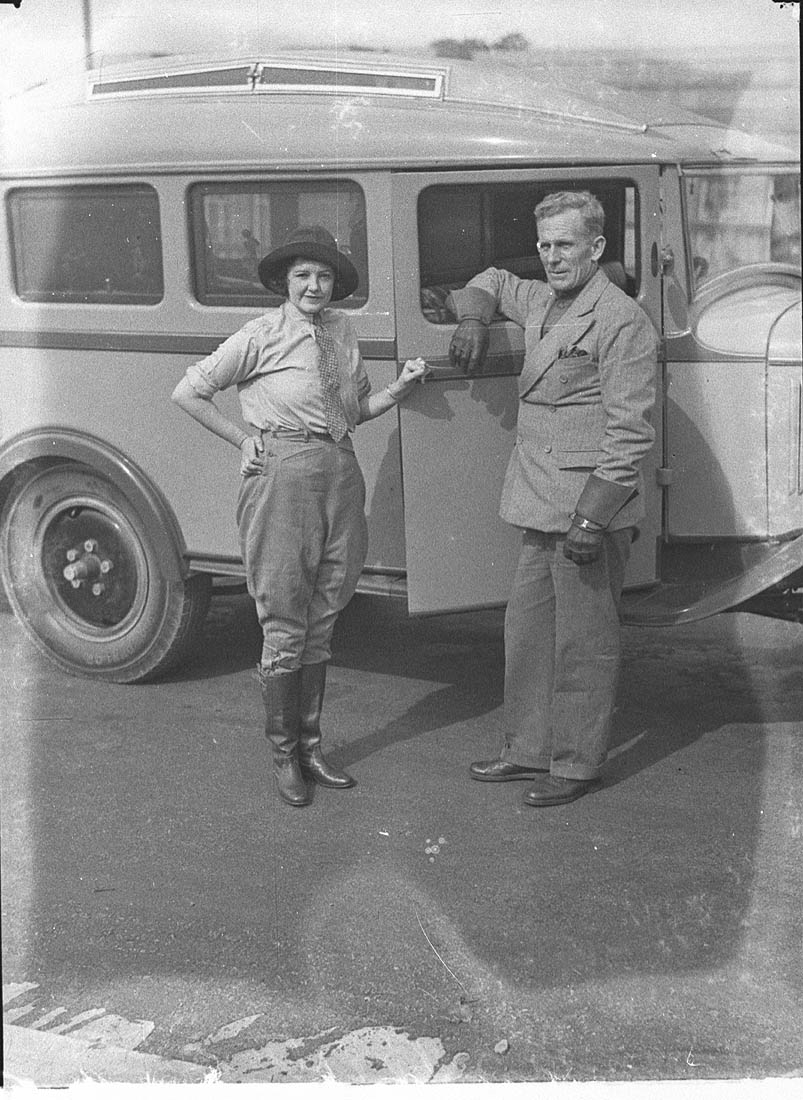
Frances and Nea Birtles in 1935

Birtles was married twice. Birtles married Frances Knight on 27 November 1920 at St Paul's Cathedral, Melbourne, but they soon separated and she divorced him in 1922. Birtles married Nea McCutcheon on 11 February 1935 at St Mary's Cathedral, Sydney, and they were together until he died at the Sydney suburb of Croydon of coronary vascular disease on 1 July 1941. Birtles is buried in the Anglican section of Waverley Cemetery.

== Works ==
=== Books ===
- 1909. Lonely Lands: Through the Heart of Australia. Sydney: N.S.W. Bookstall Co.
- 1913. 3,500 miles across Australia in a Ford car: From the Gulf of Carpentaria to Port Philip Bay. Edited and compiled by G.W. Whatmore. Adelaide, South Australia: Duncan & Fraser Ltd.
- 1924. Darwin to Adelaide, 9 days, 9 hours, 15 minutes: Francis Birtles' history making journey, 18–27 Nov 1924. Melbourne: British Imperial Oil Co. Ltd.
- 1935. Battle Fronts of Outback. Sydney: Angus and Robertson.

=== Films ===
- 1912. Across Australia with Francis Birtles.
- 1914. Into Australia's Unknown.
- 1915. Across Australia in the Track of Burke and Wills.
- 1919. Through Australian Wilds.
- 1929. Coorab in the Island of Ghosts.
- 1941. That Certain Something
