= Andy's Summer Playhouse =

Youth theater

Coordinates: 42°49′52″N 71°46′35″W

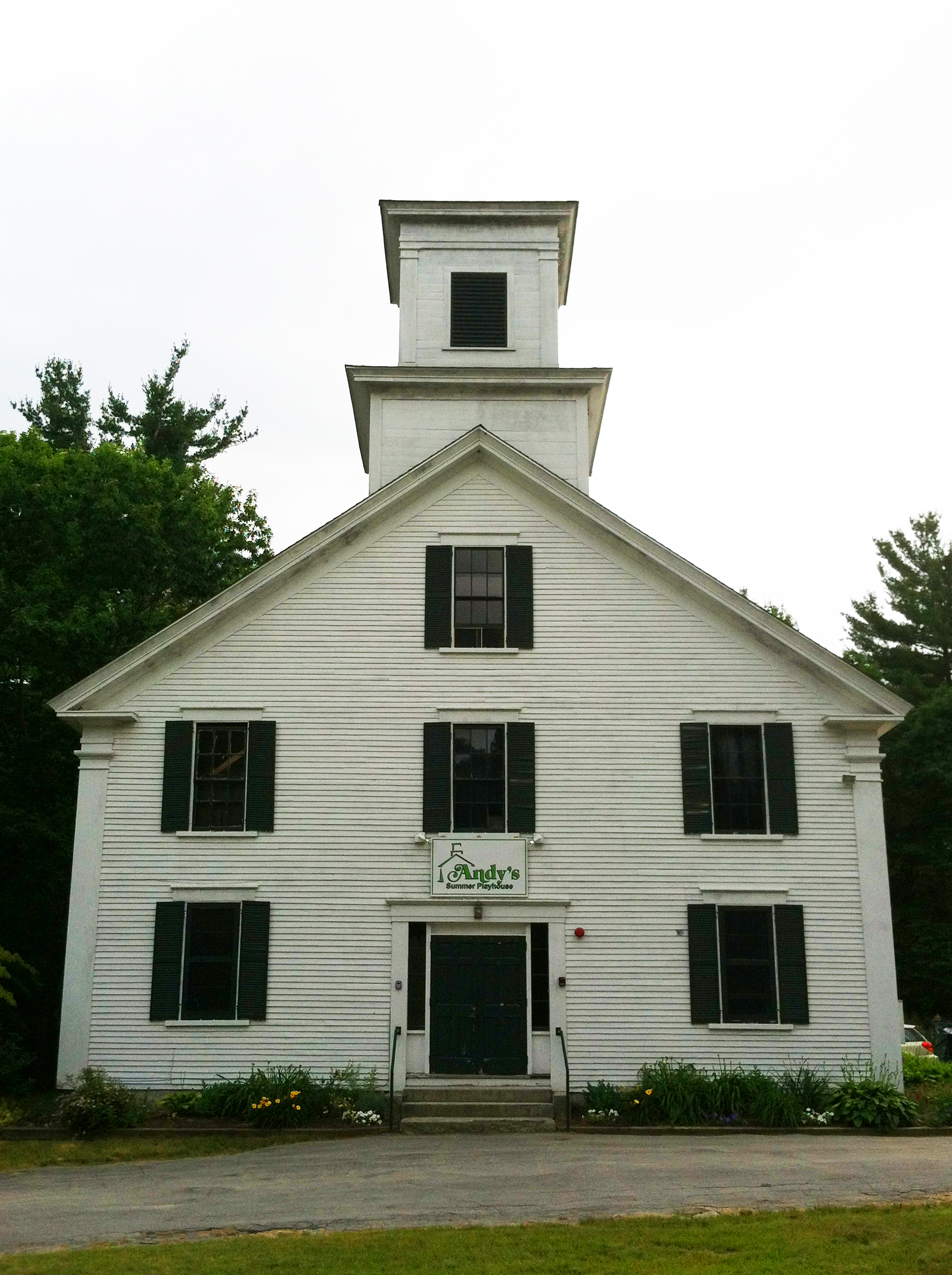
- Interactive map of Andy's Summer Playhouse
- Address: Wilton, New Hampshire; United States
- Owner: Non-profit organization
- Current use: Youth theater

Construction
- Opened: 1971

Website
- www.andyssummerplayhouse.org

Andy's Summer Playhouse is a youth theater located in Wilton, New Hampshire.

Andy's Summer Playhouse programs foster creative collaborations between children and professional artists who work in a variety of media: performance art, theater, dance, music, puppetry, video, set and lighting design and playwriting. In addition to its unique mission to produce original and adapted plays for children, the theater boasts a number of well-known alumni and teaching artists, including Tony Award winning artists Stephen Karam and Lisa Kron, Emmy Award winning artists Paul Jacobs and Sarah Durkee, Pulitzer Prize winning playwright David Lindsay-Abaire, Caldecott Medal winning authors Brian Selznick and Elizabeth Orton Jones, as well as several Alpert, Bessie, Obie, and Drama Desk Award winning artists.

== History ==
Named after children's book illustrator C. W. Anderson, Andy's was founded in 1971 by two teachers at the Mascenic Regional School, Margaret Sawyer and William Williams. The Playhouse found its first home in Mason, New Hampshire, and was later relocated to a historic meeting house in Wilton. From 1980 to 1993, the playhouse grew under the artistic direction of Dan Hurlin, who attracted a number of internationally recognized artists from PS 122, The Kitchen, 8BC, WOW Cafe and other avant-garde theatre venues in New York City. From 1994 to 2007, the theater was led by director and playwright Robert Lawson, and DJ Potter served as Artistic Director from 2008 to 2014. Both artists further solidified the organization's professional reputation, and increasingly involved alumni in the artistic and executive operations of the theatre. The theatre was run by Jared Mezzocchi, from 2014 until 2024. At the end of season 54, playwrights SMJ and Jess Honovich were announced to be the new Co-Artistic Directors for the 2025 season.

=== The Building ===
Andy's sits on the site of the original meeting house of Wilton, a log structure built in 1752 but then torn down and replaced with a larger meeting house in 1779. The second meeting house served the town for 80 years until it burned down in 1859. The town voted to build a third meeting house (the building that stands today) on the same spot, at a cost "not to exceed $2,500" and the building was completed in 1860. The original Paul Revere and Sons bell damaged in the fire was recast by Henry Northey Hooper & Sons of Boston and placed in the new building, where it remains today in the bell tower. In 1883, the town moved its business to a new Town Hall located several miles to the east in what is now downtown Wilton, so the current building was sold in 1884 to a group of interested citizens and renamed Citizens Hall. It served for many years as a public meeting hall, and was taken over by the National Grange organization in 1925, and then by Wilton Lions Club in 1968. The Pine Hill Waldorf School bought the building in 1978 and for several years ran a school on the site. It was sold to Andy's Summer Playhouse on August 11, 1985.

=== Notable alumni and teaching artists ===
- Henry Akona, director and composer
- Jess Barbagallo, playwright and performer
- Patrick Boutwell, musician
- David Bowles, director
- Rosellen Brown, author
- Matthew Buckingham, filmmaker and multimedia artist
- Lenora Champagne, playwright and performing artist
- Emmanuelle Chaulet, actress
- Austin Chick, film director, screenwriter and producer
- Catherine Coray, director, actor and teacher
- Migdalia Cruz, playwright
- Dancenoise, performance artists
- Kyle deCamp, multimedia performance artist
- David Dorfman, choreographer and teacher
- Sarah Durkee, singer-songwriter, lyricist, and writer
- Edward Einhorn, playwright, director and novelist
- Daniel Mark Epstein, poet, dramatist and biographer
- Dan Froot, performance artist and musician
- Rosanna Gamson, choreographer and director
- Janie Geiser, artist and experimental filmmaker
- Alex Gino, children's book author
- Jonathan Glatzer, writer, director and producer
- James Godwin, actor
- Mimi Goese, musician
- Ain Gordon, playwright, director and actor
- Neil Greenberg, choreographer
- David Greenspan, actor and playwright
- Rinne Groff, playwright and performer
- Sharon Hayes, multimedia artist
- Cynthia Hopkins, performance artist, composer and musician
- Holly Hughes, performance artist
- Sam Huntington, actor
- Dan Hurlin, puppeteer and performance artist
- Anne Iobst, performance artist
- Paul Jacobs, composer and musician
- Amy Jenkins, artist and experimental filmmaker
- Elizabeth Orton Jones, illustrator and children's book author
- Myles Kane, film producer and wizard rock artist
- Stephen Karam, playwright and screenwriter
- John Kelly, performance artist
- Andy Kirshner, composer, performer, writer and media artist
- Lisa Kron, actress and playwright
- Robert Lawson, writer, director, composer and visual artist
- David Leslie, performance artist and stuntman
- Elizabeth Levy, children's book author
- Chris Lindsay-Abaire, actress
- David Lindsay-Abaire, playwright, lyricist and screenwriter
- Sondra Loring, dancer, choreographer and actor
- Erika Kate MacDonald, performing artist and playwright
- Linda Mancini, actor, writer and performance artist
- Victoria Marks, choreographer and teacher
- Jared Mezzocchi, multimedia theatre director and designer
- Sarah McLellan, executive director
- Tom Murrin, performance artist and playwright
- Eileen Myles, poet and writer
- Jim Neu, playwright
- Qui Nguyen, playwright and fight director
- Brooke O'Harra, writer, director and performer
- Julia Older, poet and translator
- Pat Oleszko, performance artist
- Claire Porter, choreographer and comedian
- Dave Quay, actor
- Alice Reagan, director
- Jenny Romaine, puppeteer, performer and director
- John C. Russell, playwright
- Dan Moses Schreier, composer and sound designer
- Brian Selznick, children's book author and illustrator
- Lucy Sexton, performance artist and producer
- Louise Smith, playwright and actress
- Kate Snodgrass, director and playwright
- Henry Stram, actor
- Anna Thomford, costume designer and fiber artist
- Carmelita Tropicana, performance artist
- Fritz Van Orden, musician
- Meiyin Wang, director
- Washboard Jungle, musicians
- Erik White, musician
- Kristine Woods, visual artist
