= Robert Lawson (screenwriter) =

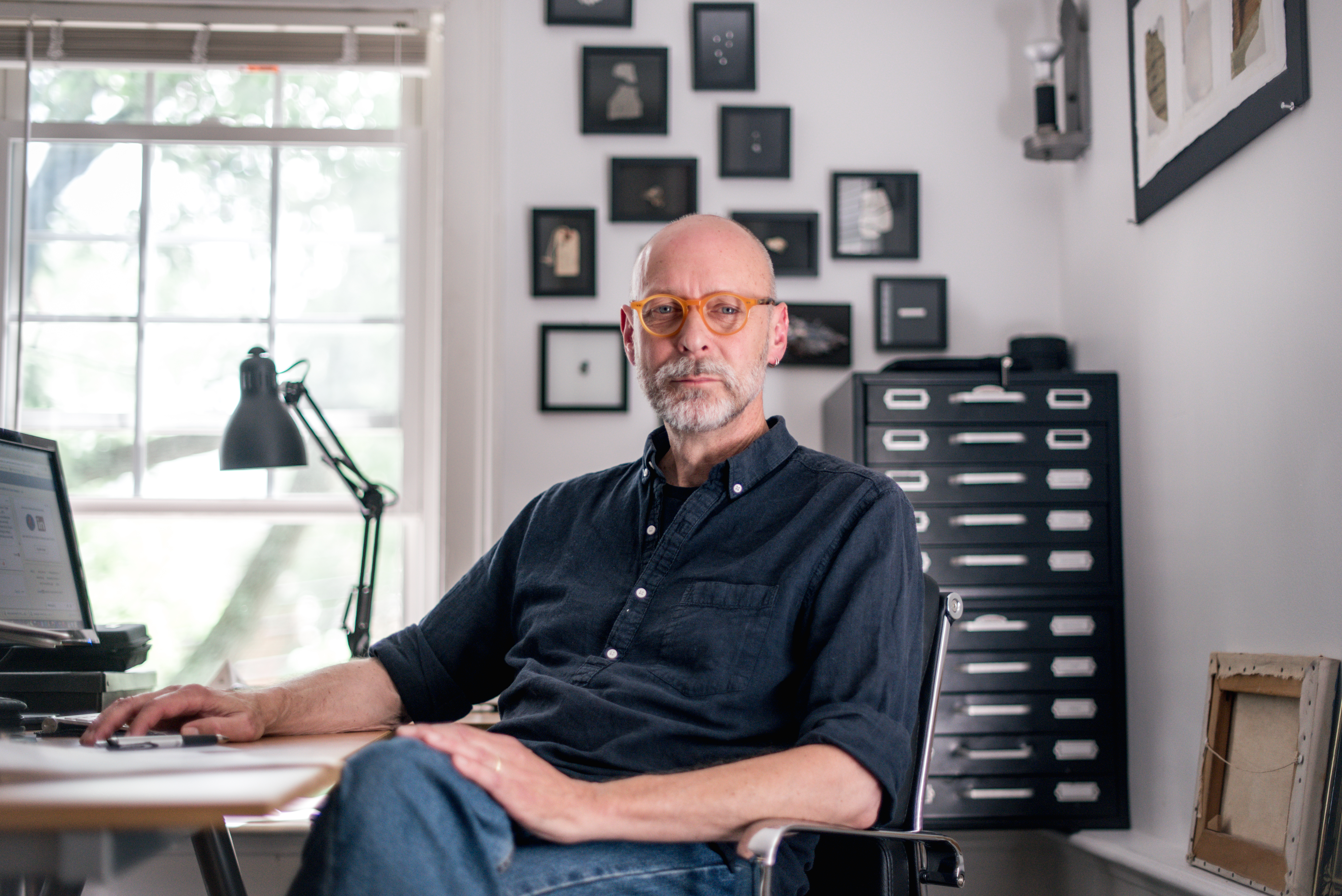
Robert Lawson (photograph by Ben Conant)

Robert Lawson is an American playwright, director, composer, screenwriter and visual artist currently living in France. Projects in development include King Callow, a limited series created with Jonathan Glatzer for RiffRaff Films and New Republic Pictures; a feature screenplay based on Walker Percy's Lancelot for Goodman Pictures; Dream/State, a limited YA TV series based on The Promises of Dr. Sigmundus by Brian Keaney for Goodman Pictures. His film, What Goes Up, co-written with Glatzer and starring Steve Coogan, Olivia Thirlby, Hilary Duff, Molly Shannon and Josh Peck, was released in 2009. The film was distributed by Sony Pictures, with a DVD release on Sony Home Entertainment.

Lawson is the author and composer of dozens of theater works, a number of which are published by Concord Theatricals and are regularly produced across the U.S., Europe and Asia. Among these are Hiroshima : crucible of light which has been produced in Singapore, London, Vancouver and Australia. NYC premiere of Hiroshima was in 2009 by the Untitled Theater Co. 61 at Walkerspace. Texts have also appeared in American Writing, Poems & Plays and The Northern New England Review. He is the recipient of a Meet the Composer grant for his work on Leonardo’s Tank produced by Andy’s Summer Playhouse (NH) for which he was artistic director 1995-2007. His 2017 collection of short stories, Geometric Cemetery, is available through Amazon, and was a finalist in the Gorsky Press, Molly Ivors Prize for Fiction. A feature based on the stories, under the title Laws of Nature, has been in development with 1stAvenue Machine (NYC, LA, London) to star Sam Huntington.

== Notable previous work includes ==
- Co-author (with Jonathan Glatzer) of Tyler’s Gap, a television project produced by Touchstone/ABC & Fox Television - Rob Bowman, director; David Duchovney, Executive Producer.
- Play commission (by co-creator Marlin Fitzwater) entitled Empires Fall concerning the fall of Communism and the relationship between George H. W. Bush & Mikhail Gorbachev (staged reading at Ford’s Theater, D.C. 2011; subsequently at the Bush Presidential Library at Texas A&M Univ., 2013).
- The Ruins of Nicholas Raithe — developed with Sam Huntington and James Roday as a television series from an original story by Lawson.
- The Great God Sokolov — written with Karen Sunde, an adaptation of her play "To Moscow". Developed with Ashworth Productions (Canada).

== Directing premieres include ==
- Quantum Janis a new musical by Richard Isen, staged reading at Ko Festival (Amherst, MA – 2018); subsequent staging at the York Theater (NYC, 2018)
- The Death of Don Juan (an opera by Elodie Lauten) at Franklin Pierce University, and in 2011 conceiving & co-directing the New York premiere at Theater for the New City, as well as a screening of the video rendition of his production at the ‘Op on Screen Festival’ (NYC).
- Other notable works premiered at Franklin Pierce University (where he was on faculty through 2018) include script, score, direction & set designs for :
  - Hamlet: 7 rooms (2014), a radical deconstruction created in collaboration with his wife, choreographer & visual artist Sally Bomer
  - Vanishing Point (2013), utilizing a score of electronic dance music
  - Echo Chamber (2011), concerning the massacre at Utøya Island in Norway
  - Terrible Destiny (2010), inspired by Truman Capote’s In Cold Blood
  - The Architect of NoPlace (2009), a music/theater project about silent films (conceived in conjunction with Austrian writer & artist Kay Mühlmann)
  - The Transit of Mercury Across the Face of the Sun (2009/2010), also in collaboration with S. Bomer, which was restaged at the Region 1 American College Theater Festival, and runner up for the National KC/ACTF Festival
  - …but the rain is full of ghosts was presented at the Kennedy Center as part of the National ACTF Festival (2003)

His series of multi-media installations - The Chapels Project - began in 2002 with an art/science installation based on the Camera Obscura that ran for two years (NH), and was followed up in 2004 with Recently Discovered : use unknown, a Wunderkammer environment of real and imagined artifacts. In 2014, the third chapel, Memorial (ghost/embers) was installed at Franklin Pierce University, then subsequently at the Fitchburg Art Museum (MA, 2015) and then again in Keene, NH at the Thorne-Sagendorph Gallery. A fourth chapel - Our Lady of the Sorrows - is in process. In the summer of 2017, his Devotional Book for the Church of Entomology was on exhibit at the Fitchburg Art Museum.

The Chronicle of Higher Education published a profile on him and his work in 2010, as did the Austrian periodical Freigeist - a publication of the Donau Universität in Krems, Austria, where he conducted an ongoing series of workshops in Narrative Strategies, Framing & Abstraction using digital media for the School of Telecommunications, Information and Media. He was on faculty at the New Hampshire Institute of the Arts MFA program in Writing for Stage & Screen until the demise of that program in 2019.

INTERNATIONAL

From 2010–2015 Lawson created original multi-media performance works as part of his Site Project initiative including The Interpretation of Dreams staged in Athens, Greece; Everyone Knows Who Bombed the Bank staged at the Hellenic American Union (Athens); and Artifacts, staged at Monash University and the abandoned Calamai Textile Mill (Prato, Italy).

He is married to artist Sally Bomer. His two splendid sons August and Finley live in Santa Cruz and Berlin respectively.
