= Whorl Inside a Loop =

2015 play

Whorl Inside a Loop is a play written by Dick Scanlan and Sherie Rene Scott. The playwrights spent several weeks working with inmates at a medium-security prison on a theater project, and then subsequently wrote a play depicting similar events.

The play premiered Off-Broadway on August 27, 2015 at the Second Stage Theatre, directed by Scalan and Michael Mayer. (Scott, Scalan and Mayer previously collaborated on Everyday Rapture.)
