= Casey Reitz =

American Businessman

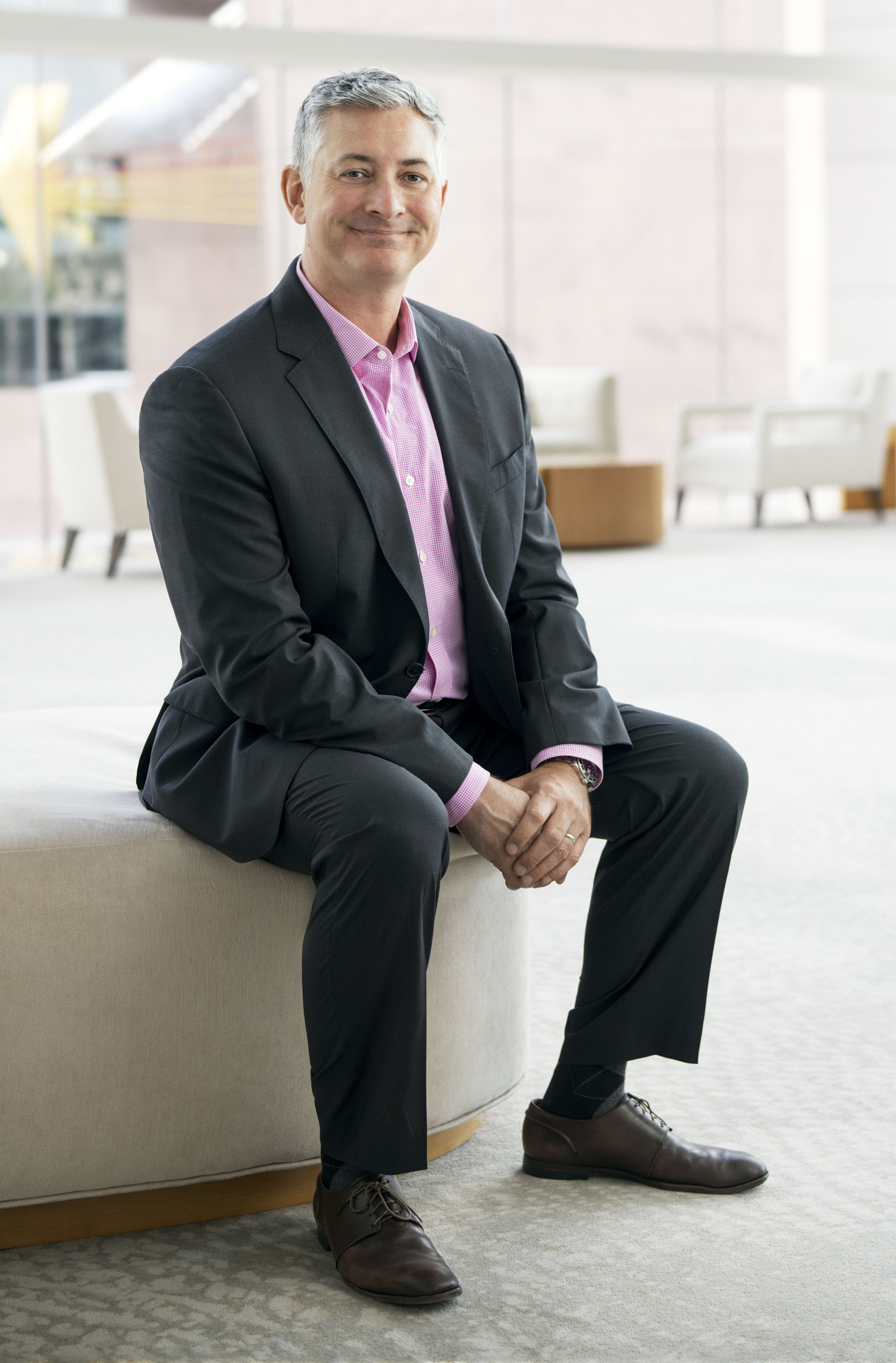
- Born: 1975 (age 50–51)
- Occupations: President & CEO
- Years active: 2019 - present
- Organization: Segerstrom Center for the Arts

Casey Reitz (/rɪts/, born November 22, 1975) is an American businessman in the performing arts industry. He currently serves as president and CEO of Segerstrom Center for the Arts in California. Reitz has earned accolades in his career, including a Tony Award for Dear Evan Hansen.

== Early life and education ==
Reitz was born 1975 in Fort Lauderdale, Florida. He grew up doing theater at JJ Daniell Middle School before going to Sprayberry High School where he continued his theater education and was awarded a scholarship for his pursuit of an acting career. He attended the University of Alabama from 1994 to 1998 and received a BA in theater. He also attended the Yale School of Drama from 2000 to 2003 and received a MFA in theater management.

== Career ==
Reitz worked for the Manhattan Theatre Club from 2004 to 2006. He served as the Director of Individual Giving at the Manhattan Theater Club after his fellowship with the organization in 2002. During his tenure, he oversaw a capital campaign that secured $35 million for the renovation of the Samuel J. Friedman Theatre on Broadway.

Reitz worked as the director of development for The Public Theater from 2006 to 2010, Reitz managed all fundraising efforts including corporate sponsorships, individual giving, The Partners Program, major gifts and more. He also managed a $35 million capital campaign to renovate their headquarters at 425 Lafayette St.

From 2010 to 2019, he served as the executive director of Second Stage Theater. During his tenure, Second Stage acquired and renovated the Helen Hayes Theater on Broadway, which made second stage the fourth non-profit operating permanently on Broadway. David Rockwell and the Rockwell Group renovated the 106-year-old theater and the project achieved LEED Gold Status. While Reitz served as executive director, Hayes Theater held commercial runs of Tony winner The Humans by Stephen Karam and Tony nominee What the Constitution Means to Me by Heidi Schreck. Reitz and Second Stage Theater won a Tony Award for Best Musical in 2017 for Dear Evan Hansen.

After leaving Second Stage Theater in 2019, he became the president and CEO of Segerstrom Center for the Arts. His tenure at the center began during the COVID-19 pandemic which saw the closure of live theater events for two years. After reopening began in 2021, Reitz secured American Ballet Theatre (ABT) as the Official Dance Company of the Center and launched the Headliners and Speaker series. In 2023, Reitz was promoted CEO by the Board of Directors,. During his tenure the center has premiered 3 ABT works including Like Water for Chocolate and Woolf Works. They have also commissioned their first musical from Ireland-based theater group Cahoots that will premiere in 2025.

== Affiliations ==
- The Broadway League
- League of Resident Theatres
- PBS SoCal Board of Directors (2023–present)

== Awards ==
Year	Award	Category	Work	Result	Ref
2017	Tony Award	Best Musical	Dear Evan Hansen	Won	
2018	Tony Award	Best Revival of a Play	Lobby Hero	Nominated	
2019	Tony Award	Best Revival of a Play	Torch Song	Nominated	

== Shows ==
Broadway
Year	Title	Role	Venue	Notes	Ref
2016	Dear Evan Hansen	Producer	Helen Hayes Theater	Original musical	
2018	Lobby Hero	Producer	Helen Hayes Theater	Play revival	
2018	Straight White Men	Producer	Helen Hayes Theater	Original play	
2018	Torch Song	Producer	Helen Hayes Theater	Play revival	
2019	What the Constitution Means to Me	Executive Director	Helen Hayes Theater	Original one-act play	
2019	Linda Vista	Executive Director	Helen Hayes Theater	Original play	
2020	Grand Horizons	Executive Director	Helen Hayes Theater	Original play	

Off-Broadway
Year	Title	Role	Notes	Ref
2010	Trust	Executive Director	Play	
2010	Bachelorette	Executive Director	Play	
2011	Wings	Executive Director	Play	
2011	Gruesome Playground Injuries	Executive Director	Play	
2011	By the Way, Meet Vera Stark	Executive Director	Play	
2011	All New People	Executive Director	Play	
2011	Sex Lives of Our Parents	Executive Director	Play	
2011	The Talls	Executive Director	Play	
2012	The Blue Flower	Executive Director	Play	
2012	How I Learned to Drive	Executive Director	Play	
2012	Lonely, I'm Not	Executive Director	Play	
2012	Dogfight	Executive Director	Musical	
2012	The Bad Guys	Executive Director	Play	
2012	Warrior Class	Executive Director	Play	
2013	Modern Terrorism, or They Who Want to Kill Us and How We Learn to Love Them	Executive Director	Play	
2013	Water By the Spoonful	Executive Director	Play	
2013	The Last Five Years	Executive Director	Musical	
2013	Nobody Loves You	Executive Director	Play	
2013	The Tutors	Executive Director	Play	
2013	Murder for Two	Executive Director	Musical	
2014	Little Miss Sunshine	Executive Director	Musical	
2014	The Happiest Song Plays Last	Executive Director	Play	
2014	The Substance of Fire	Executive Director	Play	
2014	Sex with Strangers	Executive Director	Play	
2014	American Hero	Executive Director	Play	
2014	Mala Herba	Executive Director	Play	
2015	Lips Together, Teeth Apart	Executive Director	Play	
2015	Between Riverside and Crazy	Executive Director	Play	
2015	The Way We Get By	Executive Director	Play	
2015	Whorl Inside a Loop	Executive Director	Play	
2015	The Other Thing	Executive Director	Play	
2015	King Liz	Executive Director	Play	
2016	Invisible Thread	Executive Director	Musical	
2016	Smart People	Executive Director	Play	
2016	The Layover	Executive Director	Play	
2016	Friend Art	Executive Director	Play	
2016	Engagements	Executive Director	Play	
2017	A Parallelogram	Executive Director	Play	
2017	Notes From the Field	Executive Director	Play	
2017	Man From Nebraska	Executive Director	Play	
2017	Somebody's Daughter	Executive Director	Play	
2018	Cardinal	Executive Director	Play	
2018	Mary Page Marlowe	Executive Director	Play	
2019	Days of Rage	Executive Director	Play	
2019	Superhero	Executive Director	Play	
2019	Dying City	Executive Director	Play	
2019	Make Believe	Executive Director	Play	
