= Pang! (podcast) =

Audio drama about food insecurity

Pang! is an audio drama podcast about food insecurity that was written and directed by Dan Froot and commissioned by the CSPS Legion Arts.

== Background ==
The show was commissioned by the CSPS Legion Arts and premiered on October 20, 2017 at the C.S.P.S. Hall in Cedar Rapids, Iowa. The show was performed live as a theater play and is also a podcast. The podcast includes episodes containing interviews with the families that the stories were based on. From April 20–22, 2023, the show was performed live at the University at Albany.

One of the stories follows a family living in Los Angeles who were forced to move out after their uncle was scammed out of a large amount of money. Another story is about a family of immigrants from Burundi who live in Iowa. A third story follows a 7-year-old living in Overtown whose friend was killed in a shooting. The script about the immigrant family was based on 12 hours of interviews and over 200 pages of transcriptions, which was trimmed down to three 30 minute segments.

The show was primarily voiced by three actors and contains foley. Dan Froot was the lead writer and director of the play and Bobby Gordon was the dramaturge. The show was performed by Natalie Camunas, Donna Simone Johnson, Christopher Rivas, as well as Dan Froot and Robert Een. The show's lighting director was Katelan Braymer and lighting design was by Christopher Kuhl. The sound engineer was Gary Markowitz and the sound design was by Cricket Myers with music by Robert Een.
