= C.S.P.S. Hall =

C.S.P.S. Hall may refer to:

- C.S.P.S. Hall (Cedar Rapids, Iowa)
- C.S.P.S. Hall (Saint Paul, Minnesota)
