= David Leslie =

David Leslie may refer to:

- David Leslie, 1st Lord Newark (c. 1600–1682), Scottish general in the English Civil War
- David Leslie, 3rd Earl of Leven (1660–1728), Scottish aristocrat, politician and soldier
- David Leslie, 6th Earl of Leven (1722–1802)
- David Leslie (Oregon politician) (1797–1869), American missionary and pioneer in what became the state of Oregon
- David Leslie (rugby union) (born 1952), Scottish rugby union player
- David Leslie (racing driver) (1953–2008), British racing driver
- David Leslie (performance artist), American performance artist and stuntman
