= Sherie Rene Scott =

American actress, singer, playwright (b. 1967)

- Born: February 8, 1967 (age 59); Kentucky, U.S.
- Occupations: Actress, singer, writer, producer
- Years active: 1990–present
- Children: 1

Sherie Rene Scott (born February 8, 1967) is an American actress, singer, writer and producer. She has appeared in multiple Broadway and off-Broadway plays and musicals, on numerous solo and original cast recordings, and in various film and television roles.

== Early life and education ==
Scott was born in Kentucky. When she was four years old, her family moved to Topeka, Kansas, where she grew up. Scott moved from Topeka to New York City when she was 18 to attend the Neighborhood Playhouse School of the Theatre where she studied under Sanford Meisner. She is a writer in residence at Second Stage Theater.

== Career ==
Scott's first role on Broadway was Sally Simpson in the original production of The Who's Tommy. Scott later starred on Broadway in Dirty Rotten Scoundrels, garnering nominations for a Tony Award, a Drama Desk Award and an Outer Critics Circle Award. She starred as Amneris in Elton John and Tim Rice's Aida (2000), for which she won the Clarence Derwent Award and was a Drama League Honoree. The single "A Step Too Far" performed by Elton John, Heather Headley and Sherie Rene Scott from the 1999 Elton John And Tim Rice Aida concept album charted at #15.

In 2008, Scott performed a one-night-only fundraiser on Broadway entitled You May Now Worship Me, which she co-authored with Dick Scanlan. The Benefit raised over $200,000 for the Phyllis Newman's Women's Health Initiative of The Actor's Fund and later became the Broadway show Everyday Rapture.

Everyday Rapture, co-authored with Dick Scanlan, debuted Off-Broadway at Second Stage Theatre on April 7, 2008. Starring Scott with direction by Michael Mayer and orchestrations by Thomas Kitt, the show played an extended run. For the Off-broadway production, Scott was nominated for the Lucille Lortel Award for Best Actress and the show for Best Musical. In 2010, Scott starred in Everyday Rapture, which Scott wrote with co-author Dick Scanlan. Everyday Rapture began its run on Broadway at the American Airlines Theatre in previews April 19, 2010, and officially opened on April 29, 2010. The show played to sold-out audiences throughout the run, finally ending its limited engagement on July 11, 2010. Scott received Tony Award nominations for Best Book, and Best Leading Actress in a Musical, and Drama Desk Award nominations in the categories of Best Leading Actress, Best Book, and Best Musical for Rapture.

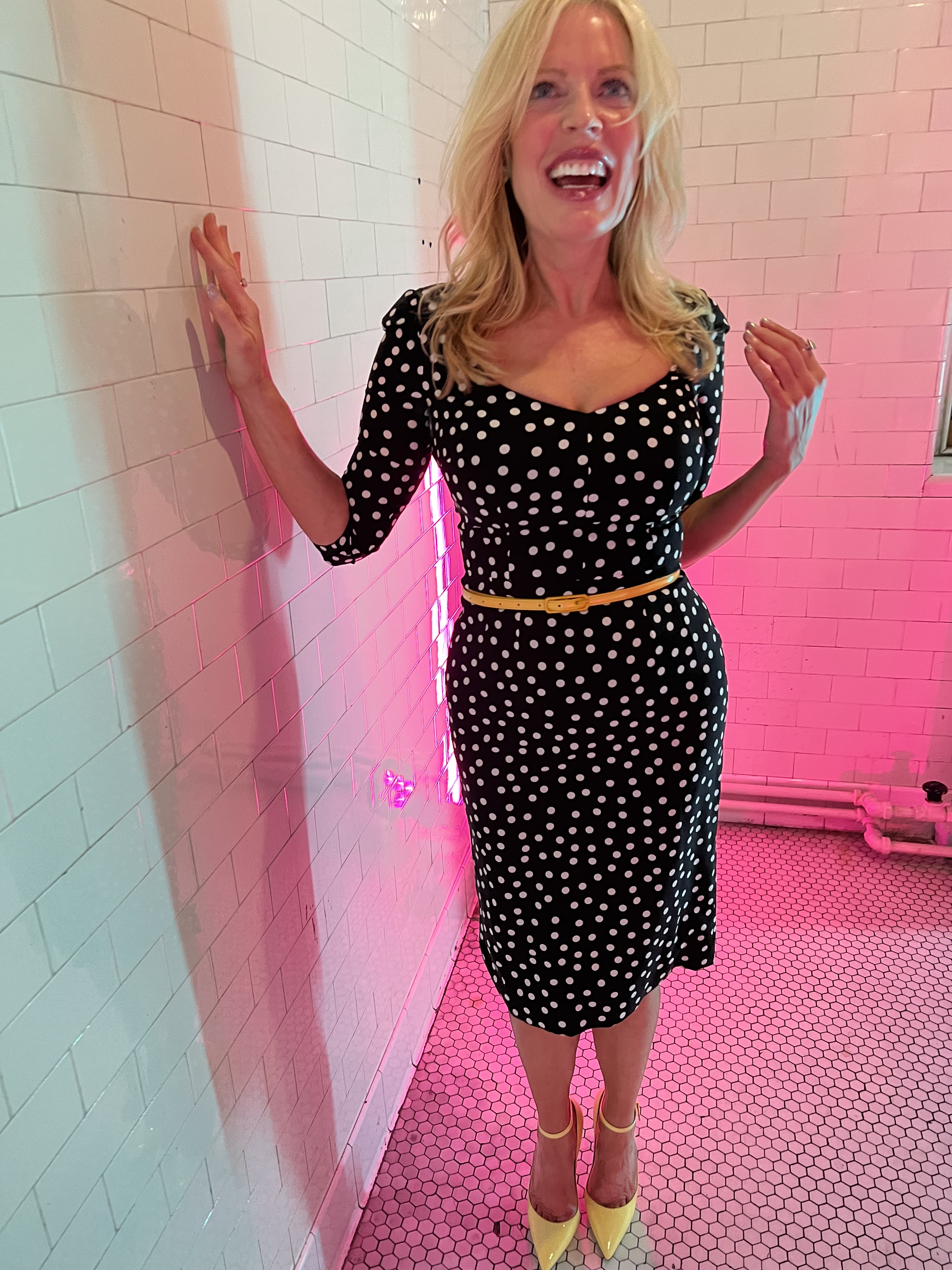
Scott performing at The Lesbian, Gay, Bisexual, & Transgender Community Center in NYC in 2023.

Other Broadway credits include Sally Simpson in Tommy (1993), Marty in Grease (1995–96), and Maureen in Rent (1997). She originated the role of Ursula in The Little Mermaid (2007) for which she received her second Outer Critics Circle Award nomination for Outstanding Featured Actress in a Musical. She starred as Pepa in the musical adaptation of Women on the Verge of a Nervous Breakdown, on Broadway, which opened on November 4, 2010. For this role she was nominated for the Drama Desk Award for Outstanding Actress in a Musical.

Scott appeared in The Front Page as Mollie Malloy. Jack O'Brien directed the production that premiered on Broadway in fall 2016 at the Broadhurst Theatre.

Whorl Inside a Loop, written by Scott and Dick Scanlan, premiered August 27, 2015, at the Second Stage Theatre. Directed by Michael Mayer and Scanlan, Whorl garnered critical acclaim, including several 'Best of 2015 Theater' Lists.

Scott's Off-Broadway roles include John Guare's play Landscape of the Body at the Signature Theatre, for which she received a 2006 Obie Award and a Lucille Lortel Award and was a Drama League honoree. Musicals include Jason Robert Brown's The Last Five Years for which she received a Drama Desk Award nomination, and the title role in Debbie Does Dallas: The Musical.

Scott can be heard on the original off-Broadway cast recording of The Last Five Years along with Norbert Leo Butz. She is an executive producer of the film The Last Five Years starring Anna Kendrick and Jeremy Jordan. Scott also makes an appearance in the film.

In regional theatre, she has appeared in world premiere productions of Randy Newman's Faust (1995). She appeared in Kander and Ebb's Over and Over, at the Signature Theatre, which was a musical adaptation of The Skin of Our Teeth, receiving a nomination for a Helen Hayes Award.

Scott co-founded the Grammy Award-winning Sh-K-Boom Records and Ghostlight Records, which seeks to preserve original cast albums and solo recordings by Broadway artists. The records, produced over 150 albums, garnered 3 Grammy awards, and 12 Grammy nominations. SKB/Ghostlight's Grammy Awards include those for the cast albums of In the Heights, The Book of Mormon and Beautiful. SKB/Ghostlight received a 2006 Drama Desk Award for dedication to the preservation of musical theatre through cast recordings. The label won their first Grammy in 2009 for the Original Cast Recording of In The Heights. Scott can be heard on numerous Grammy Award-winning and OBC cast albums, the Billboard hit single "A Step Too Far" with Elton John, "The Folks Who Live On The Hill" with jazz great Bill Charlap, as well as the critically acclaimed, "Sherie Rene…Men I've Had," Everyday Rapture the original Broadway cast album, and All Will Be Well: The Piece Of Meat Studio Sessions, produced with Todd Almond.

Scott completed a try-out of her work Piece of Meat, in collaboration with Todd Almond, in the 2012 Adelaide Cabaret Festival and premiered it in New York City at 54 Below from October 16–27, 2012.

From July 9–28, 2019, she wrote and starred in an original musical collaboration titled TWOHANDER at Feinstein's/54 Below alongside Norbert Leo Butz, with musical director Todd Almond. Scott previously shared the stage with Butz in the original productions of the musicals Dirty Rotten Scoundrels and The Last Five Years.

== Work ==
=== Broadway ===
Year	Show	Role	Venue
1993–1995	The Who's Tommy	Sally Simpson	St. James Theatre
1995–1996	Grease	Marty Maraschino (replacement)	Eugene O'Neill Theatre
1997	Rent	Maureen Johnson (replacement)	Nederlander Theatre
2000–2004	Aida	Amneris	Palace Theatre
2005–2006	Dirty Rotten Scoundrels	Christine Colgate	Imperial Theatre
2007–2009	The Little Mermaid	Ursula	Lunt-Fontanne Theatre
2008	You May Now Worship Me	Herself	Benefit Concert at the Eugene O'Neill Theatre
2010	Everyday Rapture	Herself	American Airlines Theatre
2010–2011	Women on the Verge of a Nervous Breakdown	Pepa	Belasco Theatre
2016–2017	The Front Page	Mollie Malloy	Broadhurst Theatre
2025	The Queen of Versailles	Jackie Siegel (standby)	St. James Theatre
2026	The Rocky Horror Show	Magenta (replacement)	Studio 54

=== Other theatre ===
Year	Title	Role	Notes
1995	Randy Newman's Faust	Martha	The La Jolla Playhouse
1996	Randy Newman's Faust	Martha	Goodman Theatre
2002	Debbie Does Dallas: The Musical	Debbie	Jane Street Theatre
2002	The Last Five Years	Cathy Hyatt	Minetta Lane Theatre, Off-Broadway
2002	Next to Normal	Diana Goodman	Workshop
2006	Landscape of the Body	Rosalie	Peter Norton Space
2007	The Little Mermaid	Ursula	Denver Center for the Performing Arts
2015	Whorl Inside a Loop	Volunteer	Second Stage Theatre
2017	Hamlet	Gertrude	Waterwell/Sheen Center
2017	The Portuguese Kid	Atalanta	Manhattan Theatre Club
2024–2025	Little Shop of Horrors	Audrey Fulquard	Westside Theatre, Off-Broadway

=== Filmography ===
Year	Film	Role	Notes
1990	Teenage Mutant Ninja Turtles: Coming Out of Their Shells Tour	April O'Neil	Filmed live at Radio City Music Hall
1998	The Almost Perfect Bank Robbery	Dawn	TV movie
2003	Marci X	Kirsten Blatt	
2007	P.S. I Love You	Barbara	
2014	The Last Five Years	Director	Uncredited cameo
2018	The Portuguese Kid	Atalanta	BroadwayHD recording of Off-Broadway production

=== Discography ===
- 1999 Elton John And Tim Rice's Aida (1999 Concept Album) – Island Records
- 2000 Sherie Rene Scott: Men I've Had (Solo CD) – Sh-K-Boom Records
- 2000 Aida (Original Broadway Cast Recording) – Disney
- 2002 Debbie Does Dallas (Off-Broadway Cast Recording) – Sh-K-Boom Records
- 2002 The Last Five Years (Off-Broadway Cast Recording) – Sh-K-Boom Records
- 2005 Bright Lights, Big City (Cast Recording Recording) – Sh-K-Boom Records
- 2005 Hair (Actors' Fund of America Benefit Recording) – Sh-K-Boom Records
- 2005 Dirty Rotten Scoundrels (Original Broadway Cast Recording) – Sh-K-Boom Records
- 2008 Disney's The Little Mermaid (Original Broadway Cast Recording) – Disney
- 2010 Everyday Rapture (Original Broadway Cast Recording) – Sh-K-Boom Records
- 2011 Women on the Verge of a Nervous Breakdown (Original Broadway Cast Recording) – Sh-K-Boom Records

== Awards and nominations ==
Year	Award	Category	Nominated Work	Result
2000	Clarence Derwent Award	Most Promising Female	Aida	Won
2002	Drama Desk Award	Outstanding Actress in a Musical	The Last Five Years	Nominated
2005	Tony Award	Best Performance by a Leading Actress in a Musical	Dirty Rotten Scoundrels	Nominated
2005	Drama Desk Award	Outstanding Actress in a Musical	Dirty Rotten Scoundrels	Nominated
2005	Outer Critics Circle Award	Outstanding Actress in a Musical	Dirty Rotten Scoundrels	Nominated
2008	Outer Critics Circle Award	Outstanding Featured Actress in a Musical	The Little Mermaid	Nominated
2010	Tony Award	Best Book of a Musical	Everyday Rapture	Nominated
2010	Tony Award	Best Performance by a Leading Actress in a Musical	Everyday Rapture	Nominated
2010	Drama Desk Award	Outstanding Book of a Musical	Everyday Rapture	Nominated
2010	Drama Desk Award	Outstanding Actress in a Musical, Best Book of a Musical and Best Musical	Everyday Rapture	Nominated
2011	Drama Desk Award	Outstanding Actress in a Musical	Women on the Verge of a Nervous Breakdown	Nominated
