= Any Other Day =

Any Other Day may refer to:

- Any Other Day, film from Rainbow Reel Tokyo
- "Any Other Day", song by Bon Jovi from Lost Highway (Bon Jovi album)
- "Any Other Day", song by Hilary Duff from soundtrack to What Goes Up
