= Jared Mezzocchi =

- Born: 1985 (age 40–41)
- Education: Brooklyn College (MFA Performance and Interactive Media), Fairfield University (BA Theater, Film/New Media)
- Known for: Theatre, Director and Designer
- Awards: Obie Award (2023); Helen Hayes Awards (2023); Obie Award (2017); Lucille Lortel Award (2017); Henry Hewes Design Award (2017); Drama Desk Nomination (2017); Outer Critics Circle Nomination (2017); Elliot Norton Awards (2015); IRNE Awards (2015); Princess Grace Award (2012); NH Theatre Awards for Best Original Playwright (2011)

Jared Mezzocchi is an American theatre director and projection designer.

In 2020, Jared was named in a Top 5 List in the New York Times as a Theatre Artist spotlit for their innovative work during the pandemic, alongside Andrew Lloyd Webber and Paula Vogel. His work as a co-director and multimedia designer for Sarah Gancher's RUSSIAN TROLL FARM gained him particular notoriety in the New York Times as Critics Pick and noted as one of the first digitally-native successes for virtual theater. In 2023, Mezzocchi was awarded his second Obie Award for this digital production, alongside his creative team. In 2017, Mezzocchi won an Obie Award, a Lucille Lortel Award, a Henry Hewes Award, and an Outer Critics Circle and Drama Desk Award nomination for his work on Qui Nguyen's Vietgone at the Manhattan Theatre Club. In recognition of his work with the HERE Arts Center in New York City in 2012, Mezzocchi became the first projection designer to receive a Princess Grace Award in theatre. In 2011, Mezzocchi won the Best Original Playwright award at the New Hampshire Theater Awards. He has collaborated with theatre companies in the U.S. and Europe, including Big Art Group, The Builders Association, 3-Legged Dog, Arena Stage, Studio Theater, Theater J, Center Stage, Olney Theatre Center, Everyman Theatre, Cleveland Play House, Milwaukee Repertory Theater, and Wilma Theater. Currently, he teaches projection design at University of Maryland in Washington, D.C., and serves as Artistic Director of Andy's Summer Playhouse, a youth theatre in Wilton, NH

== Awards ==
- 2023 Obie Award – Co-Direction & Multimedia Design, Russian Troll Farm
- 2023 Helen Hayes Award – Projection Design, We Declare You a Terrorist
- 2021 Mini-Commission for New Work at Vineyard Theatre
- 2020 Macdowell Colony Fellow
- 2020 Helen Hayes Award Nomination – Outstanding Direction, Curious Incident of the Dog in the Night-Time (Round House Theatre)
- 2019 Helen Hayes Award Nomination – Outstanding Original Play Adaptation, How To Catch A Star (The John F. Kennedy Center for the Performing Arts)
- 2017 Henry Hewes Design Award – Projection Design, Vietgone (Manhattan Theatre Club)
- 2017 Obie Award – Projection Designer
- 2017 Lucille Lortel Awards – Projection Design, Vietgone (Manhattan Theatre Club)
- 2017 Drama Desk Award (nomination) – Projection Design, Vietgone (Manhattan Theatre Club)
- 2017 Outer Critics Circle Award (nomination) – Projection Design, Vietgone (Manhattan Theatre Club)
- 2017 Macdowell Colony Fellow
- 2015 Helen Hayes Award (nomination) – Outstanding Lighting Design (with Projections), Totalitarians (Woolly Mammoth Theater)
- 2015 Elliot Norton Awards – Outstanding Design, Astroboy and the God of Comics (Company One)
- 2015 IRNE Awards (Independent Reviewers of New England) – Best Projections, Astroboy and the God of Comics (Company One)
- 2013 Dance Metro DC Award – Excellence in Stage Design/Multimedia, ISADORA IN RUSSIA (WORD DANCE)
- 2012 Princess Grace Awards – HERE Arts Center
- 2011 NH Theatre Awards – Best Original Playwright – The Lost World (Andy's Summer Playhouse)

== Notable Work ==
=== Virtual Performance during the Pandemic, Directing & Multimedia Design ===
- 2022 SECTION230 – HERE Arts Center URHERE Launch, Multimedia Director & Creator
- 2021 On The Beauty of Loss – Vineyard Theatre Mini-Commission, Multimedia Director & Creator
- 2021 Someone Else’s House – Geffen Playhouse Writer & Performer
- 2020 Russian Troll Farm – Theaterworks Hartford, TheatreSquared, The Civilians Co-Director, Multimedia Designer
- 2020 CANCELLED – Diversionary Theatre Director, Multimedia Designer

=== Theater Directing ===
- 2024 SANDRA – TheaterWorks Hartford
- 2022 We Declare You a Terrorist – Round House Theatre
- 2021 On The Beauty of Loss – Vineyard Theatre Mini-Commission
- 2020 Russian Troll Farm – Theaterworks Hartford, TheatreSquared, The Civilians
- 2020 CANCELLED – Diversionary Theatre
- 2019 Curious Incident of the Dog in the Night-Time – Round House Theatre
- 2018 How To Catch a Star – The Kennedy Center for the Performing Arts
- 2018 Around The World in 80 Days – National Players
- 2015 The Lost World – University of Maryland, College Park

=== Off-Broadway Design ===
- 2023 Poor Yella Rednecks – Manhattan Theatre Club
- 2016 Vietgone – Manhattan Theatre Club

=== Off-Off Broadway Design ===
- 2013 The Downtown Loop – 3-Legged Dog
- 2013 You Are Dead. You Are Here. – HERE Arts Center

=== Washington D.C. Design ===
- 2017 Color's Garden – National Gallery of Art
- 2017 I'll Get You Back Again – Round House Theatre
- 2017 The Arsonists – Woolly Mammoth Theatre Company
- 2017 Smart People – Arena Stage
- 2017 Intelligence – Arena Stage
- 2016 The Nether – Woolly Mammoth Theatre Company
- 2014 Stones in his Pockets – Centerstage Baltimore
- 2013 Race – Theatre J
- 2012 The Elaborate Entrance of Chad Deity – Woolly Mammoth Theatre Company
- 2012 Astro Boy and the God of Comics – Studio Theatre

=== Regional Design ===
- 2017 Wild & Reckless – Portland Centerstage
- 2016 American Song – Milwaukee Rep
- 2014 Breath & Imagination – Cleveland Playhouse
- 2014 The History of Invulnerability – Milwaukee Rep

=== Fashion and Industrial ===
- 2013 Connect4Climate / Alcantara, Design Week – Milan, IT
