= Dan Froot =

American performance artist, writer, dancer, composer and saxophonist

Dan Froot is an American performance artist, writer, dancer, composer and saxophonist.

In 1991, Froot received a Bessie Award for his music theater work, Seventeen Kilos of Garlic. In 2001, he received a City of Los Angeles Individual Artist Fellowship (a.k.a. C.O.L.A.) for the creation of his gangster-vaudeville, Shlammer. Froot's music concerts, theater pieces, and performance events have been presented by leading art centers across the U.S., and in Europe, Africa and South America. He has composed numerous scores for dance and theater companies, has taught performance workshops around the country, has created an ongoing series of collaborative interdisciplinary duets with choreographer David Dorfman, and has danced, acted and played music nationally and internationally with Victoria Marks, Ralph Lemon, Yoshiko Chuma & The School of Hard Knocks, Mabou Mines, David Cale, Ping Chong & Co., and Jeff Weiss. From 1992 to 1996, he was the director of the Bennington College July Program, an intensive academic and cultural enrichment experience for teens at Bennington College, and was a member of the program's drama faculty from 1984 to 1992. Froot teaches at UCLA's Department of World Arts and Cultures/Dance.

From 2008 to 2012, Froot and puppet artist Dan Hurlin collaborated on a series of short puppet plays under the collective title of Who's Hungry.

Froot's work has received major support from MAP Fund, Doris Duke Charitable Trust, The Jim Henson Foundation, Los Angeles County Arts Commission, UCLA Center for Community Partnerships, University of California Institute for Research in the Arts, The National Endowment for the Arts, The City of Los Angeles Department of Cultural Affairs, The City of West Hollywood, AEPOCH Foundation, Jerome Foundation, Meet The Composer, National Foundation for Jewish Culture, The Durfee Foundation, The Pennsylvania Council on the Arts, The New York State Council on the Arts, The Vermont Community Arts Foundation, The New England Foundation for the Arts, The Mary Flagler Cary Charitable Trust, and Reader's Digest.

Froot wrote and directed Pang!.
