= Bohemian Commercial Historic District =

Historic district in Iowa, United States

- U.S. National Register of Historic Places
- U.S. Historic district
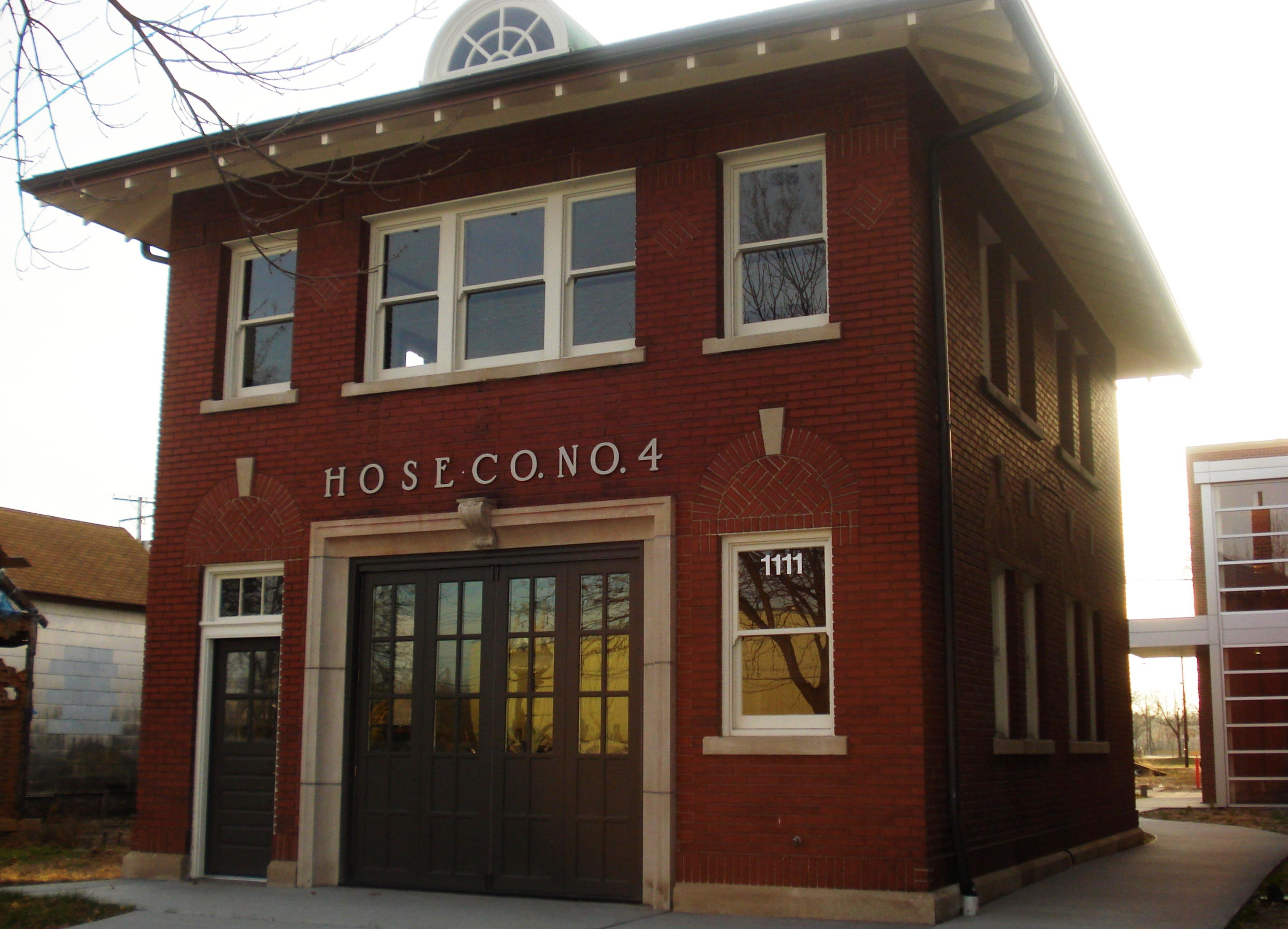
- Hose Company No. 4

- Location within Iowa Location within the United States
- Location: 1000 to 1300 blocks of 3rd St., SE. and the 100 and 200 blocks of 14th Ave., SE. Cedar Rapids, Iowa
- Coordinates: 41°58′10″N 91°38′49″W
- Area: 19.9 acres (8.1 ha)
- Architect: Hirons Dennison
- Architectural style: Late 19th and 20th Century Revivals
- MPS: Cedar Rapids, Iowa MPS
- NRHP reference No.: 02001539
- Added to NRHP: December 20, 2002

The Bohemian Commercial Historic District, also known as New Bohemia, is located in Cedar Rapids, Iowa, United States. It was listed on the National Register of Historic Places in 2002. At the time of its nomination it consisted of 75 resources, which included 48 contributing buildings, and 27 non-contributing buildings. Bohemian immigrants began settling in Cedar Rapids in the 1850s, and increasingly after the American Civil War in the 1860s and the Austro-Prussian War in 1866. They grew to be the largest ethnic group in the city, and the only one to settle in a distinct part of Cedar Rapids. They settled along the Cedar River between the downtown area and the T.M. Sinclair and Company meat packing plant. The buildings in the district were constructed between the 1880s and the 1930s. They are largely narrow-front commercial buildings and corner blocks. The buildings housed a variety of commercial establishments: a movie theater, two banks, and several filling stations. It also includes a railroad corridor factory building, a fire station, and fraternal halls. The buildings are representative of various commercial architectural styles and vernacular building forms popular at the times they were built. The Lesinger Block (1883) and the C.S.P.S. Hall (1891) are individually listed on the National Register of Historic Places.
