= Anna Thomford =

American fabric artist and costume designer

- Occupations: Fabric artist, costume designer
- Years active: 1980s–present
- Known for: Collaborations with puppeteer Dan Hurlin
- Notable work: The Shoulder, Hiroshima Maiden, Disfarmer, Demolishing Everything with Amazing Speed

Anna Thomford is an American fabric artist and costume designer best known for her longtime collaboration with puppeteer and theatre artist Dan Hurlin. She has designed costumes and fabric work for many of Hurlin’s productions, including The Shoulder (1999), Hiroshima Maiden (2004), Disfarmer (2009), and Demolishing Everything with Amazing Speed (2016).

Her work on Hurlin’s Hiroshima Maiden was noted in the Los Angeles Times, which praised “a tiny kimono (one of many by costumer Anna Thomford)” for its detailed craft. She was also costume designer for Disfarmer (2009), reviewed by Variety and TheaterMania, both covering productions that credited her work on puppet costumes and soft furnishings.

Her later collaborations, such as Demolishing Everything with Amazing Speed (2016), premiered at Bard College’s SummerScape Festival, where she again served as costume designer.

Thomford’s work has been featured at venues such as St. Ann’s Warehouse, Bard College’s Fisher Center, and Long Wharf Theatre.
