= Dan Hurlin =

American puppeteer and performance artist

- Born: 1955 (age 70–71)
- Known for: Theatre and puppetry
- Awards: Alpert Award in the Arts (2004); MacDowell Colony Fellowship (2003); John Simon Guggenheim Memorial Foundation Fellowship (2002); New York Dance and Performance award (2001); Village Voice OBIE Award (1990)

Dan Hurlin (born 1955) is an American puppeteer and performance artist.

== Life and work ==
Performance works include: No(thing so powerful as) Truth (1995); Constance and Ferdinand (1991) with Victoria Marks; Quintland (The Musical) (1992); The Jazz Section (1989) with Dan Froot; and two toy theater pieces, The Day the Ketchup Turned Blue (1997) from the short story by John C. Russell, and Who's Hungry?/West Hollywood (2008) with Dan Froot. His large puppet piece Hiroshima Maiden (2004), with an Obie Award winning score by Robert Een, premiered at St. Ann's Warehouse and was awarded a UNIMA citation of excellence. Disfarmer (2009), a puppet piece about American photographer Mike Disfarmer, premiered at St. Ann's Warehouse and is the subject of the 2011 documentary Puppet, by David Soll.

As a performer he has worked with Ping Chong, Janie Geiser, Annie B. Parson & Paul Lazar, and Jeffrey M. Jones, and directed premieres of works by Lisa Kron, Holly Hughes, Dan Froot, John C. Russell and Erik Ehn. Until his retirement Dan Hurlin was a professor of dance composition and puppetry at Sarah Lawrence College as well as the director of the graduate program in theater there. Until 2023, he served on the board of the MacDowell Colony in Peterborough, NH.

Dan Hurlin is the recipient of several awards including the 2004 Alpert Award for theater, a 1990 Obie Award for his solo adaptation of Nathanael West's A Cool Million, and a 2001 Bessie Award for his suite of puppet pieces Everyday Uses for Sight Nos. 3 & 7, a collaboration with composer Guy Klucevsek. He won a 2014 Rome Prize in visual art.
