= Michael Mayer (director) =

American stage and film director

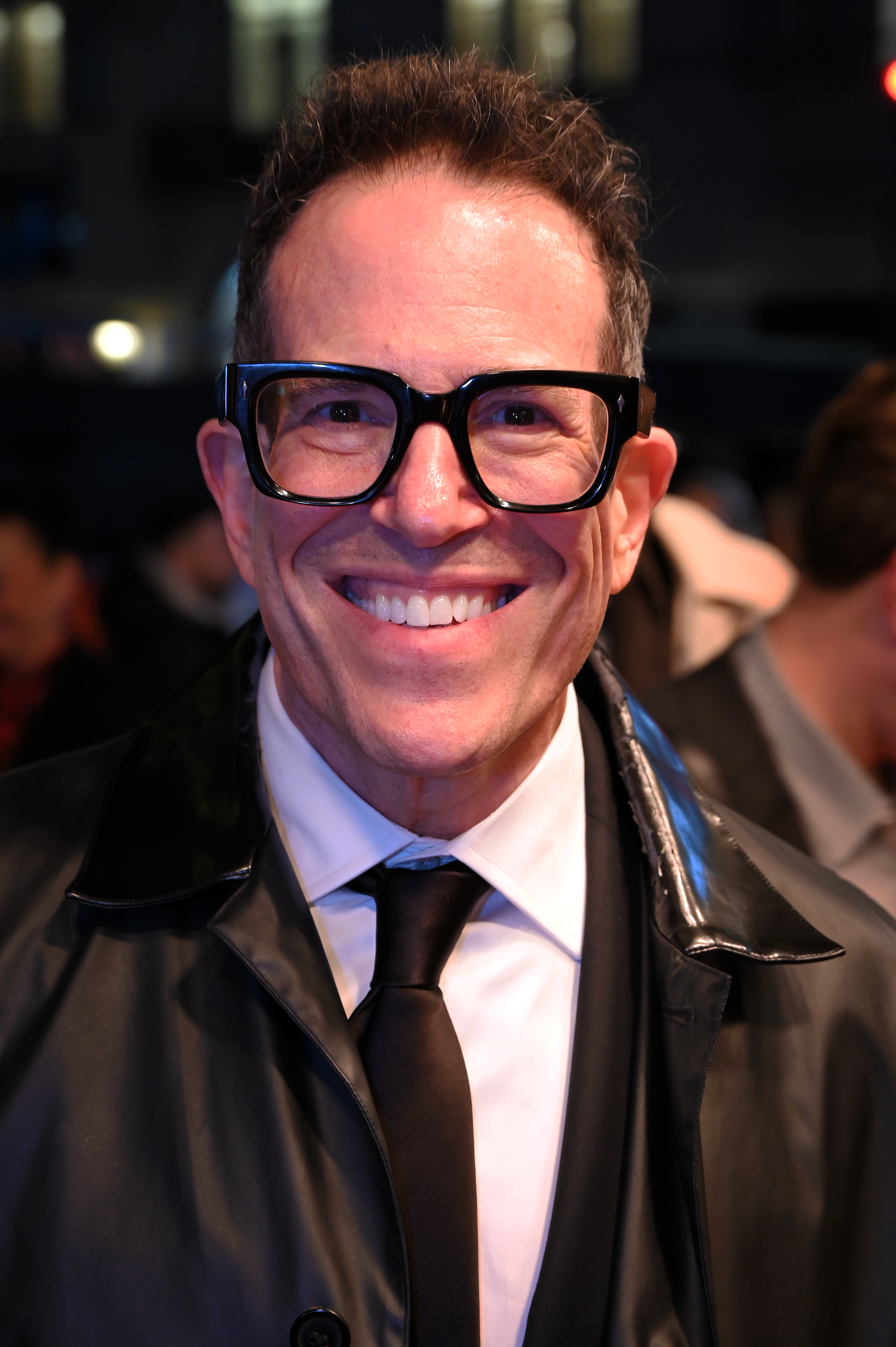
- Mayer in 2025
- Born: June 27, 1960 (age 66); Bethesda, Maryland, U.S.
- Education: New York University (MFA)
- Occupations: Director, playwright, producer
- Years active: 1976-present
- Spouse: Roger Waltzman

Michael Mayer (born June 27, 1960) is an American director, playwright, and producer. He won the 2007 Tony Award for Best Direction of a Musical for Spring Awakening.

== Early life and education ==
Mayer was born in Bethesda, Maryland, to Jewish parents Joseph Emanuel “Jerry” (1933-2024), a labor attorney and Louise Mayer (née Levinson; 1936-2017). For his bar mitzvah, he asked his parents for a movie camera and received a Super 8 single lens with a zoom. His first film was a dramatization of "The Night the Lights Went Out in Georgia".

After graduating from Charles W. Woodward High School, he studied at the University of Wisconsin before transferring to study acting at New York University (NYU)'s Graduate Acting Program at the Tisch School of the Arts, where he earned an MFA in Theater in 1983.

== Career ==
Mayer began performing onstage in New York City, performing in plays such as Tony Kushner's A Bright Room Called Day, but by 1990 had turned his efforts to directing, working as a freelancer while also teaching at NYU, the Lincoln Center Theater Institute, and the Juilliard School. He also served as an assistant director for Kushner's Hydriotaphia.

=== Theatre ===
In 2007, Mayer won his first Tony Award for his direction of the musical adaptation of Spring Awakening (2006), which also won the award for Best Musical. He was nominated for the 2002 Tony for his direction of Thoroughly Modern Millie, which he then directed on London's West End. Mayer also won the Drama Desk Award for Outstanding Director of a Musical for both Spring Awakening and Thoroughly Modern Millie.

Other Broadway credits include The Lion in Winter (1999), the 1999 revival of You're a Good Man, Charlie Brown, and Side Man (1998; Drama Desk Award). He directed the 1998 Tony Award-winning revival of Arthur Miller's A View from the Bridge starring Anthony LaPaglia and Brittany Murphy, for which he was nominated for a Tony and won a Drama Desk Award. He directed Triumph of Love in 1997, starring Betty Buckley, Susan Egan, and F. Murray Abraham, with music by Jeffrey Stock and lyrics by Susan Bikenhead.

Mayer directed and co-wrote the book for the Green Day-inspired musical American Idiot (which premiered in 2009 at Berkeley Rep and transferred to Broadway in 2010), based on the band's album of the same name. He directed and "re-conceived" the 2011 revival of On a Clear Day You Can See Forever starring Harry Connick Jr. He directed the first Broadway production of Hedwig and the Angry Inch, which opened in 2014.

Mayer's off-Broadway directing credits include Little Shop of Horrors, The Credeaux Canvas, John C. Russell's Stupid Kids, Peter Hedges' Baby Anger, Theresa Rebeck's View of the Dome, and the New York premiere of Janusz Głowacki's Antigone in New York.

=== Film and television ===
After directing on- and off-Broadway for more than 15 years, Mayer made his feature-film directorial debut with A Home at the End of the World, starring Colin Farrell and Robin Wright Penn, in 2004. He went on to make the family film Flicka (2006), an adaptation of the story My Friend Flicka, which became a hit in DVD market. In 2013 and 2014 he directed select episodes of Amazon's Alpha House starring John Goodman. In 2015, he directed a new film adaptation of The Seagull, starring Annette Bening, Corey Stoll, and Saoirse Ronan.

He directed the pilot and three subsequent episodes of NBC's TV series Smash, which were broadcast starting in February 2012.

He should not be confused with the identically spelled Michael Mayer, who directed a film titled Graduation (2007).

=== Opera ===
Mayer made his Metropolitan Opera debut in 2012 with Rigoletto; he reset the scene from 16th-century Mantua to 1960s Las Vegas. He was the director of the premiere of Nico Muhly's Marnie for the English National Opera in 2017, which was later performed at the Metropolitan Opera in 2018. He also directed a new production of Verdi's La traviata for the Metropolitan Opera in December 2018.

== Personal life ==
Mayer is openly gay. He lives with his partner, oncologist Roger Waltzmann, in Chelsea, Manhattan. He is close friends with playwright Tony Kushner, whom he met while studying at NYU.

== Works ==
=== Stage productions ===
Broadway

- Galileo (November 2026)
- Chess (2025)
- Swept Away (2024)
- Funny Girl (2022)
- Burn This (2019)
- Head Over Heels (2018)
- The Terms of My Surrender (2017)
- Hedwig and the Angry Inch (2014)
- On a Clear Day You Can See Forever (2011)
- Everyday Rapture (2010)
- American Idiot (2010)
- Spring Awakening (2006)
- Thoroughly Modern Millie (2002)
- 'night, Mother (2004)
- After the Fall (2004)
- An Almost Holy Picture (2002)
- Uncle Vanya (2000)
- The Lion in Winter (1999)
- You're a Good Man, Charlie Brown (1999)
- Side Man (1998)
- A View from the Bridge (1997)
- Triumph of Love (1997)

Off-Broadway

- Little Shop of Horrors (2019)
- WarholCapote (2017)
- Love, Love, Love (2016)
- God Bless You, Mr. Rosewater (2016)
- Whorl Inside a Loop (2015, with Dick Scanlan)
- Brooklynite (2015)
- Everyday Rapture (2009)
- Our House
- 10 Million Miles
- Spring Awakening (2006)
- Missing Persons
- America Dreaming
- Hundreds of Hats

West End

- Funny Girl (2016)

National tour

- Hedwig and the Angry Inch (2016–17)
- American Idiot (2011–13)
- Spring Awakening (2008–10)
- Thoroughly Modern Millie (2003–04)
- Angels in America (1994–95)

Opera

- Rigoletto (Metropolitan Opera, 2012)
- Marnie (English National Opera, 2017; Metropolitan Opera, 2018)
- La traviata (Metropolitan Opera, 2018)
- Aida (Metropolitan Opera, 2024)

=== Film ===
- Single All the Way (2021)
- The Seagull (2018)
- Flicka (2006)
- A Home at the End of the World (2004)

== Awards and nominations ==
Year	Award	Category	Work	Result	Ref.
1999	Tony Award	Best Direction of a Musical	You're a Good Man, Charlie Brown	Nominated	
2002	Tony Award	Best Direction of a Musical	Thoroughly Modern Millie	Nominated	
2007	Tony Award	Best Direction of a Musical	Spring Awakening	Won	
2007	Outer Critics Circle Award	Outstanding Director of a Musical	Spring Awakening	Won	
2014	Tony Awards	Best Direction of a Musical	Hedwig and the Angry Inch	Nominated	
2020	Outer Critics Circle Award	Outstanding Director of a Musical	Little Shop of Horrors	Honored	
2021	Grammy Awards	Best Musical Theater Album	Little Shop of Horrors	Nominated	
2022	Drama League Award	Best Direction of a Musical	Funny Girl	Nominated	

== See also ==
- LGBT culture in New York City
- List of LGBT people from New York City
- NYC Pride March
