= Czecho Slovakian Association Hall (Iowa City, Iowa) =

- U.S. National Register of Historic Places
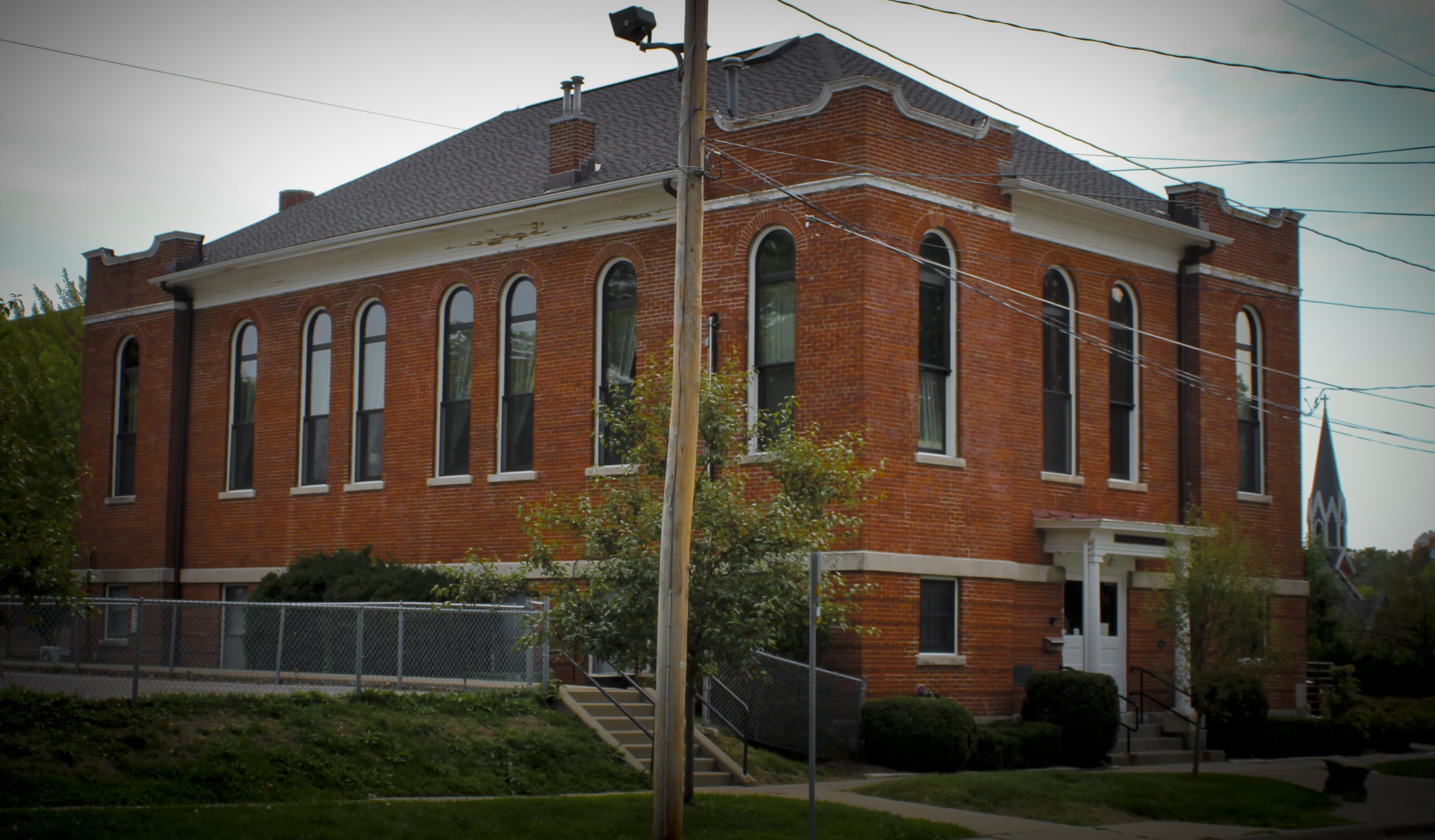

- Location within Iowa Location within the United States
- Location: 524 N. Johnson St. Iowa City, Iowa
- Coordinates: 41°40′2″N 91°31′36″W
- Area: less than one acre
- Built: 1900
- NRHP reference No.: 76000775
- Added to NRHP: November 7, 1976

The Czecho Slovakian Association Hall, also known as Preucil School of Music, is a building in Iowa City, Iowa that was built in 1900, as a community center and meeting place for the Czech-Slovak Protective Society (C.S.P.S.), which later became the Czecho Slovakian Association. The C.S.P.S., like other fraternal organizations, began by offering a kind of insurance. The local chapter was organized in Iowa City in 1882. It served the Czech community that was concentrated in the north and northeast areas of the city. Like other C.S.P.S. halls, it hosted social, cultural, and educational activities, and this one also hosted gymnastics.

The building is a 72 feet (22 m) by 42 feet (13 m) two-story red brick building with a hipped roof. An assembly room, with a high vaulted ceiling and tall arched windows, occupies the second floor. As of 1975, the room had a stage on one end and a balcony on the other, and was being renovated to serve as a concert hall.

It was listed on the National Register of Historic Places in 1976.

== See also ==
- C.S.P.S. Hall (Cedar Rapids, Iowa), also NRHP-listed, built in 1891
