= Erika Kate MacDonald =

American theatre artist and playwright

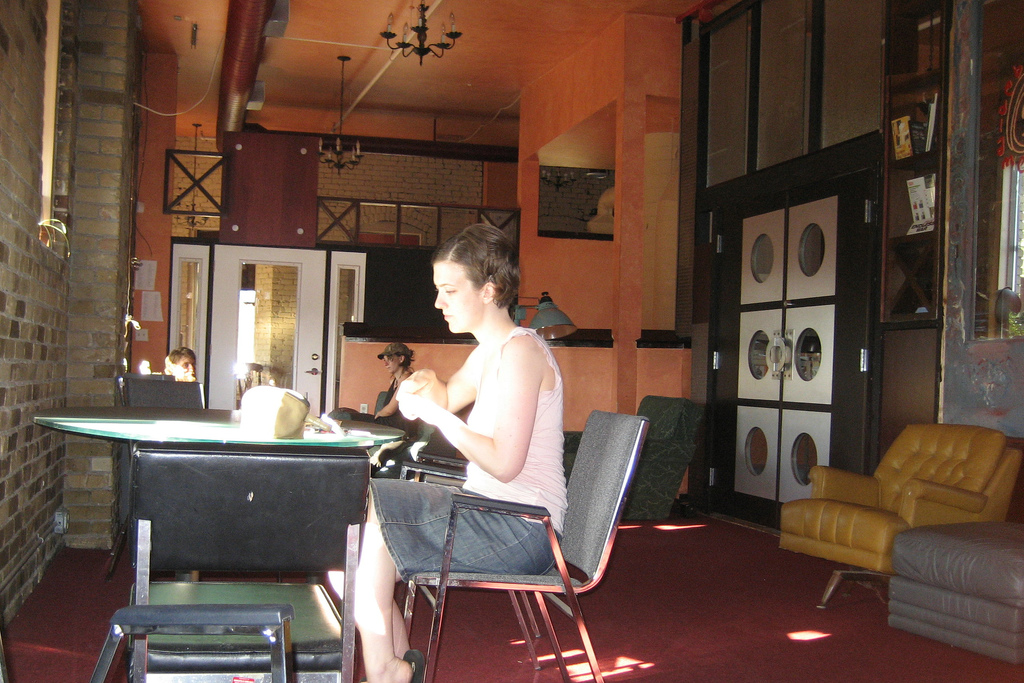

Erika Kate MacDonald is an American theatre artist and playwright based out of Cincinnati, Ohio. MacDonald won the top award at the Orlando Fringe Festival in 2018 for her shadow puppet horror play, 13 Dead Dreams of “Eugene”, which she created and performed together with storyteller Paul Strickland.
