= Lesinger Block =

- U.S. National Register of Historic Places
- U.S. Historic district – Contributing property
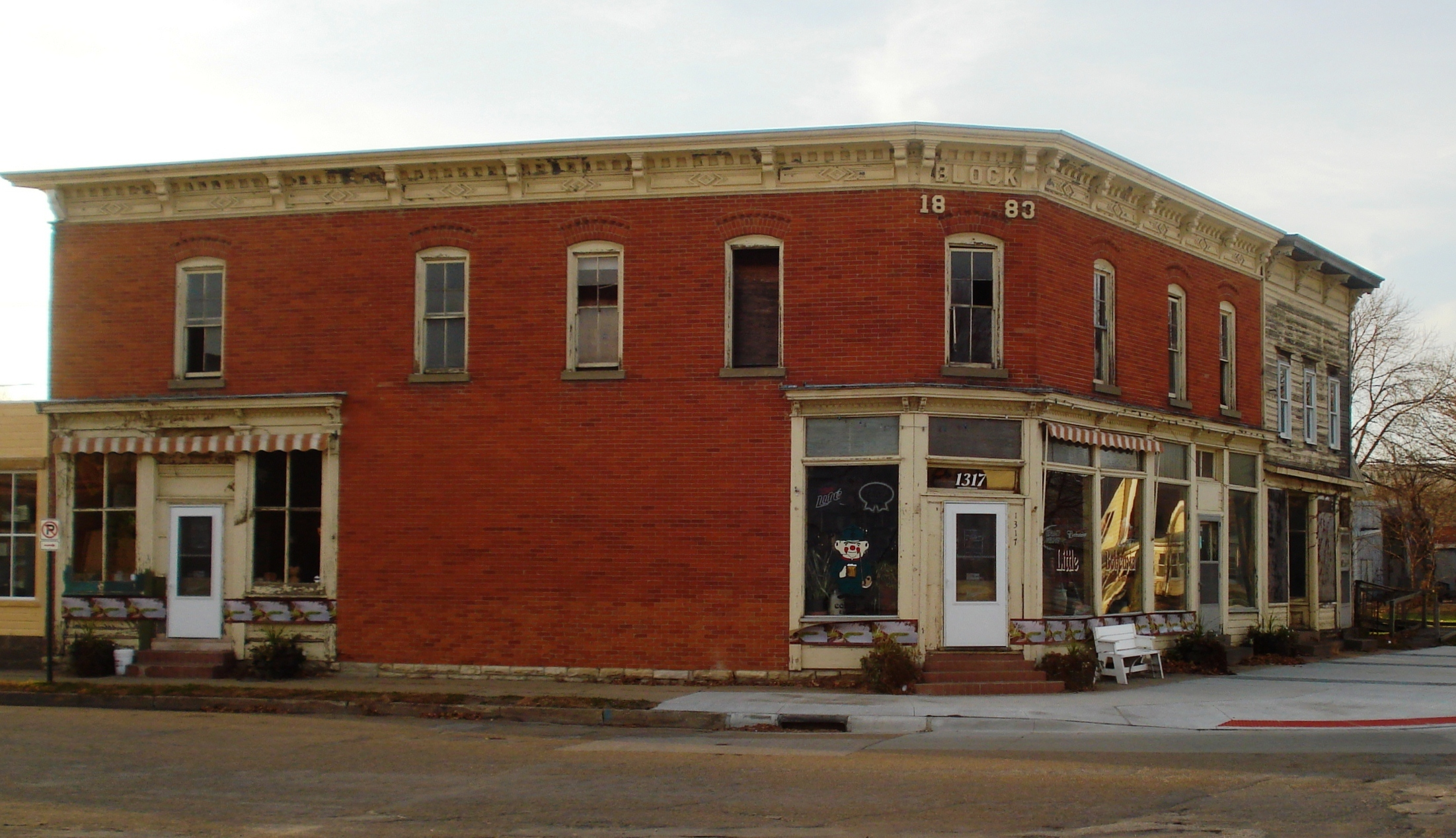

- Location within Iowa Location within the United States
- Location: 1317 3rd St., SE; Cedar Rapids, Iowa
- Coordinates: 41°58′08″N 91°39′25.5″W
- Area: less than one acre
- Built: 1883
- Architectural style: Italianate
- Part of: Bohemian Commercial Historic District (ID02001539)
- MPS: Commercial & Industrial Development of Cedar Rapids MPS
- NRHP reference No.: 97001544
- Added to NRHP: December 24, 1997

The Lesinger Block, also known as Little Bohemia, is a historic building located in Cedar Rapids, Iowa, United States. This building was constructed at a time of economic expansion in the city. It is a contemporary of several Italianate commercial blocks that were built downtown. Because of subsequent development in that commercial district those buildings have been replaced with newer structures leaving this building as the best extant example of commercial Italianate in Cedar Rapids. It was constructed by Vaclav Lesinger, an immigrant from Kozlov, Bohemia. He was a tailor by trade and he had this structure built in 1883 to house his tailor shop and a dry goods store. Since 1907 the building has housed a tavern that has served as a social center for the local Bohemian community. Architecturally, the two-story brick structure still retains a good deal of its original wood ornamentation, including the sawtooth frieze above the storefronts and the geometric design in the bracketed cornice.

The building was individually listed on the National Register of Historic Places in 1997. In 2002 it was included as a contributing property in the Bohemian Commercial Historic District.
