= Working in the Theatre =

Documentary television series

- Country of origin: United States
- Original language: English

Original release
- Release: 1976 – present

Working in the Theatre is the American Theatre Wing’s Emmy nominated documentary series created to highlight the theatre industry's inner-workings. The series profiles notable members of the industry, and provides a closer look at unique stories and important work. Working in the Theatre aims to inform audiences about typically less well-known aspects of the theatre by sharing The Wing's extensive knowledge of the industry. The series has been running for more than four decades, and has featured extraordinary work from numerous members of the industry. Working in the Theatre receives leadership support from Doris Duke Charitable Foundation and The Dorothy Strelsin Foundation. The series is also supported, in part, by the New York City Department of Cultural Affairs in partnership with the City Council and the New York State Council on the Arts with the support of Governor Andrew Cuomo and the New York State Legislature.

== History ==
Working in the Theatre was initially broadcast from the Graduate Center of the City University of New York, led by Wing chair at the time Isabelle Stevenson, and moderated by various board members. Until 2005, the series was only available for viewing on CUNY-TV, a local New York City television station, or at a few NYC libraries. In March 2005 it was announced that The Wing would be releasing Working in the Theatre episodes for free streaming online.

== Current production ==
In July 2017, The Wing was $60,000 in National Endowment for the Arts (NEA) grants, $25,000 of which will directly support Working in the Theatre.

== Episodes ==
=== Season 1 ===
No. overall	No. in season	Title
1	1	"Performance"
2	2	"Playscript"
3	3	"Production: The Elephant Man"

=== Season 2 ===
No. overall	No. in season	Title
4	1	"Performance"
5	2	"Playscript"
6	3	"Production"
7	4	"Production: Barnum"
8	5	"Playscript"
9	6	"Performance"
10	7	"Design"

=== Season 3 ===
No. overall	No. in season	Title
10	1	"Performance"
11	2	"Playscript"
12	3	"Production: Fifth of July"
13	4	"Design"
14	5	"Performance"
15	6	"Production: The Shubert Organization"

=== Season 4 ===
No. overall	No. in season	Title
16	1	"Performance"
17	2	"Playscript"
18	3	"Production: Producing Now & Then"
19	4	"Performance"
20	5	"Design"
21	6	"Production: Nine"

=== Season 5 ===
No. overall	No. in season	Title
22	1	"Performance"
23	2	"Playscript"
24	3	"Production: Angel’s Fall"
25	4	"Performance"
26	5	"Production: La Cage Aux Folles"
27	6	"Design"

=== Season 6 ===
No. overall	No. in season	Title
28	1	"Playwright, Director & Choreographer"
29	2	"Production: Dancing in the End Zone"
30	3	"Performance"
31	4	"Performance"
32	5	"Playwright, Director & Choreographer"
33	6	"Production: Hurly Burly"
34	7	"Design Awards"

=== Season 7 ===
No. overall	No. in season	Title
35	1	"Performance"
36	2	"Playwright, Director & Choreographer"
37	3	"Production: Grind"
38	4	"Performance"
39	5	"Playwright & Director"
40	6	"Big River"
41	7	"Design"

=== Season 8 ===
No. overall	No. in season	Title
42	1	"Performance"
43	2	"Playwright & Director"
44	3	"Production: Precious Sons"
45	4	"Performance"
46	5	"Playwright & Director"
47	6	"Production: House of Blue Leaves"

=== Season 9 ===
No. overall	No. in season	Title
48	1	"Performance"
49	2	"Playwright & Director"
50	3	"Production: Sweet Sue"
51	4	"Performance"
52	5	"Playwright & Director"
53	6	"Production: Burn This"
54	7	"Design"

=== Season 10 ===
No. overall	No. in season	Title
55	1	"Performance"
56	2	"Playwright & Director"
57	3	"Production: M. Butterfly"
58	4	"Performance"
59	5	"Playwright, Director & Choreographer"
60	6	"Production: Spoils of War"
61	7	"Design Awards"

=== Season 11 ===
No. overall	No. in season	Title
62	1	"Performance"
63	2	"Playwright and Director"
64	3	"Production: The Heidi Chronicles; London"
65	4	"Performance"
66	5	"Playwright, Director & Choreographer"
67	6	"Production: Orpheus Descending"
68	7	"Design Awards"

=== Season 12 ===
No. overall	No. in season	Title
69	1	"Performance"
70	2	"Producing"
71	3	"Production: Gypsy & Cat on a Hot Tin Roof"
72	4	"Performance"
73	5	"Playwright, Director & Choreographer"
74	6	"Production: A Few Good Men"
75	7	"Design Awards"

=== Season 13 ===
No. overall	No. in season	Title
76	1	"Performance"
77	2	"Performance"
78	3	"Playwright, Director & Choreographer"
79	4	"Production: Will Rogers Follies"
80	5	"Design"

=== Season 14 ===
No. overall	No. in season	Title
81	1	"Performance"
82	2	"Playwright & Director"
83	3	"Production: Crazy for You"
84	4	"Performance"
85	5	"Playwright & Director"
86	6	"Production: Jelly’s Last Jam"
87	7	"Unions & Guilds"
88	8	"Design"

=== Season 15 ===
No. overall	No. in season	Title
89	1	"Production: Anna Christie"
90	2	"Performance"
91	3	"Playwright & Director"
92	4	"Production: Fool Moon"
93	5	"Regional Theatre/New Play Development"
94	6	"Performance"
95	7	"Playwright & Director"
96	8	"Production: Kiss of the Spider Woman"
97	9	"Design"

=== Season 16 ===
No. overall	No. in season	Title
98	1	"Performance"
99	2	"New Play Development"
100	3	"Playwright, Director & Choreographer"
101	4	"Production: Beauty & the Beast"
102	5	"Performance"
103	6	"Playwright & Director"
104	7	"Production: Damn Yankees"
105	8	"Design"

=== Season 17 ===
No. overall	No. in season	Title
106	1	"Performance"
107	2	"Playwright & Director"
108	3	"Production: Love! Valour! Compassion!"
109	4	"Regional Theatre: Goodspeed Opera House"
110	5	"Performance"
111	6	"Playwright, Director & Choreographer"
112	7	"Production: Moon Over Buffalo"
113	8	"Design Awards"

=== Season 18 ===
No. overall	No. in season	Title
114	1	"Performance"
115	2	"Playwright & Director"
116	3	"Production: Master Class"
117	4	"Return to Broadway"
118	5	"Performance"
119	6	"Playwright, Director & Choreographer"
120	7	"Production: Fit to be Tied"
121	8	"Design"

=== Season 19 ===
No. overall	No. in season	Title
122	1	"Performance"
123	2	"Playwright, Director & Choreographer"
124	3	"Production: Stanley"
125	4	"Unions & Guilds"
126	5	"Performance"
127	6	"Playwright & Director"
128	7	"Production: Side Show"
129	8	"Design"

=== Season 20 ===
No. overall	No. in season	Title
130	1	"Performance"
131	2	"Production: The Lion King"
132	3	"Playwright & Director"
133	4	"Production: Ragtime"
134	5	"Performance"
135	6	"Playwright, Director & Choreographer"
136	7	"Production: Side Man"
137	8	"Design"

=== Season 21 ===
No. overall	No. in season	Title
138	1	"Performance"
139	2	"Performance"
140	3	"Playwright, Director & Choreographer"
141	4	"Production: The Civil War"
142	5	"Critics"
143	6	"Playwright, Director & Choreographer"
144	7	"Production: Contact"
145	8	"Design"
146	9	"Performance 1999"

=== Season 22 ===
No. overall	No. in season	Title
147	1	"Playwright, Director & Choreographer"
148	2	"Production: Aida"
149	3	"Performance"
150	4	"Playwright, Director & Choreographer"
151	5	"Production: The Full Monty"
152	6	"Composer & Lyricist"
153	7	"Performance"

=== Season 23 ===
No. overall	No. in season	Title
154	1	"Playwright, Director & Choreographer"
155	2	"Production: The Producers"
156	3	"Performance"
157	4	"Playwright, Director & Choreographer"
158	5	"Production: Mamma Mia!"
159	6	"Performance"
160	7	"Design"

=== Season 24 ===
No. overall	No. in season	Title
161	1	"Playwright & Director"
162	2	"Thoroughly Modern Millie"
163	3	"Performance"
164	4	"Performance"
165	5	"Playwright & Director"
166	6	"Women Producers"
167	7	"Design"
168	8	"Performance"
169	9	"Hairspray"

=== Season 25 ===
No. overall	No. in season	Title
170	1	"World Theatre"
171	2	"Playwright, Director & Choreographer"
172	3	"Production: Urban Cowboy"
4	4	"Design"
174	5	"Performance"
175	6	"Production: Big River"
176	7	"Playwright, Director & Choreographer"
177	8	"Production: Avenue Q"
178	9	"Design"
179	10	"Performance"

=== Season 26 ===
No. overall	No. in season	Title
180	1	"New Plays & Playwrights"
181	2	"Performance"
182	3	"Producing New Plays for Broadway"
183	4	"Caroline, or Change"
184	5	"Playwrights"
185	6	"Puppetry & Theatre"
186	7	"Not-For-Profits of Broadway"
187	8	"Performance"
188	9	"Humor in Performance"

=== Season 27 ===
No. overall	No. in season	Title
189	1	"Stage Veterans"
190	2	"Off-Broadway"
191	3	"Musicals: Directors & Choreographers"
192	4	"Interpreting Tennessee Williams"
193	5	"Production: Dirty Rotten Scoundrels"
194	6	"Performance"
195	7	"Exploring Summer Theatre"
196	8	"Pop Music & the New Musical"
197	9	"Production: See What I Wanna See"
198	10	"Staging the Classics"
199	11	"Producing Commercial Theatre"
200	12	"Actors on Performing 2005"

=== Season 28 ===
No. overall	No. in season	Title
201	1	"Critics"
202	2	"The Playwright"
203	3	"Production: The Drowsy Chaperone"
204	4	"Actors on Performing"
205	5	"Design"
206	6	"Directing"
207	7	"Producing Commercial Theatre Off-Broadway"
208	8	"Production: Grey Gardens"
209	9	"Leading Ladies"
210	10	"Playwrights"

=== Season 29 ===
No. overall	No. in season	Title
211	1	"The Evolution of Encores!"
212	2	"Casting Directors"
213	3	"The Coast of Utopia"
214	4	"Leading Men"
215	5	"August Wilson’s Legacy"
216	6	"Artistic Directors"

=== Season 30 ===
No. overall	No. in season	Title
217	1	"The Next Generation"
218	2	"Horton Foote’s America"
219	3	"From New Dramatists"
220	4	"Composers and Lyricists"
221	5	"Off-Broadway Companies"
222	6	"Featured Performers"
223	7	"Directors on Directing"
224	8	"Steppenwolf: From Chicago to Osage County"
225	9	"Unexpectedly Theatre"
226	10	"Performing Musicals"
227	11	"Demystifying the Classics"
228	12	"Producing Broadway"

=== Season 31 ===
No. overall	No. in season	Title
229	1	"Actors Words, Writers Voice"
230	2	"Arias to Showstoppers: World of Opera and Theatre"
231	3	"99 and Under"
232	4	"Making Ogre Broadway"
233	5	"Stage Veterans 2009"
234	6	"Consolation and Provocation: Playwrights 2009"
235	7	"New Writers, New Musicals: Jonathan Larson Grants 2009"
236	8	"Crafting Worlds: Theatrical Design"
237	9	"For the Record: Inside Cast Albums"
238	10	"At Work and Play: Lead Actors 2009"
239	11	"Fluidity and Change: Directors 2009"
240	12	"First and Loudest: the Marketing of Broadway"

=== Season 32 ===
No. overall	No. in season	Title
241	1	"Leading Ladies 2009"
242	2	"Regional Theatres"
243	3	"Beyond Broadway"
244	4	"Amazing Affinity: Actors 2009"
245	5	"Production: Next to Normal"
246	6	"The Play That Changed My Life"
247	7	"Producing’s New Voices"
248	8	"Understudies"
249	9	"Playwrights 2010"
250	10	"Developing Musical Theatre"
251	11	"Equal Exchange: Actors 2010"
252	12	"The Next Generation 2010"

=== Season 33 ===
No. overall	No. in season	Title
253	1	"The Vocabulary of Dance: Choreographers 2010"
254	2	"Embracing Process: Directors 2010"
255	3	"Getting the Show on the Road"
256	4	"Compelling Stories: Playwrights 2011"
257	5	"Through Their Eyes: Actors 2011"
258	6	"The Characters Start Talking: Playwrights 2011"
259	7	"Don’t Be Afraid: Stage Veterans 2011"
260	8	"Theatre Journalism: Online and Off"
261	9	"Passion and Compassion: Actors 2011"
262	10	"Directors 2011"
263	11	"Challenges and Triumphs: Actors 2011"
264	12	"Behind the Curtain"

=== Season 34 ===
No. overall	No. in season	Title
265	1	"The Stage of Theatre: Institutions and Producers"
266	2	"Regional Theatre"
267	3	"Producers: A Creative Approach"
268	4	"The Playwright’s Voice"
269	5	"Casting Directors"
270	6	"Featured Performers 2012"
271	7	"Directors: Process & Collaboration"
272	8	"The Publicists’ World"
273	9	"Exploring Musical Theatre"
274	10	"The Tony Awards: History, Highlights, and Backstage"

=== Season 35 ===
No. overall	No. in season	Title
275	1	"America’s New Theatre Companies"
276	2	"Theatre’s Super Lawyers"
277	3	"The Impact of Regional Theatre"
278	4	"The Anatomy of a Song"
279	5	"Reimagining Musicals"
280	6	"Critics and Social Media"
281	7	"Setting the Stage"

=== Season 36 ===
No. overall	No. in season	Title
282	1	"Reimagining Shakespeare"
283	2	"Playwrights"
284	3	"Immersive Theatre"
285	4	"Before the Show: Billy Porter/Patina Miller"
286	5	"Swings, Standbys, Understudies"
287	6	"Since I Suppose - Site Specific Theatre"
288	7	"Before the Show: Jessie Mueller/Lena Hall"
289	8	"Costumes"
290	9	"Puppets on Stage"

=== Season 37 ===
No. overall	No. in season	Title
291	1	"Arena Stage"
292	2	"Steppenwolf"
293	3	"Colossal - Olney, MD"
294	4	"Colossal - Minneapolis, MN"
295	5	"Projection Design - 59 Productions"
296	6	"Before the Show: Celia Keenan-Bolger"
297	7	"Society of London Theatre"
298	8	"The Globe"
299	9	"Prop Masters"
300	10	"Colossal - Dallas, TX"
301	11	"Scenic Design"
302	12	"Second City"
303	13	"Projection Design with Jeff Suggs"

=== Season 38 ===
No. overall	No. in season	Title
304	1	"Marie’s Crisis"
305	2	"Manual Cinema"
306	3	"Under Construction"
307	4	"Sign Language Theatre"
308	5	"Before the Show: Joel Perez"
309	6	"Double Edge Theatre"
310	7	"A Conversation with The Humans: Live"
311	8	"Choreography"
312	9	"Makeup"
313	10	"White Rabbit Red Rabbit"
314	11	"Casebook of Hadestown"
315	12	"The Ghosts of Lote Bravo"
316	13	"Ragtime on Ellis Island"
317	14	"Lighting Design"
318	15	"Clowning"

=== Season 39 ===
No. overall	No. in season	Title
319	1	"Building the Wall"
320	2	"Theatre in Arkansas"
321	3	"Polyphone"
322	4	"Solo Performance"
323	5	"Playwriting"
324	6	"LIVE: A Doll’s House, Part 2"
325	7	"Programming"
326	8	"The Blueprint Specials"
327	9	"Curtain Up!"
328	10	"School of Rock"

=== Season 40 ===
No. overall	No. in season	Title
329	1	"Adaptation"
330	2	"Odd Jobs"
331	3	"D.I.Y. Theatre"
332	4	"Theatrical Animals"
333	5	"Vocal Coach"
334	6	"Magic"
335	7	"Cicely Tyson"
336	8	"Wigs"
337	9	"Wardrobe at LCT"
338	10	"Revivals"
339	11	"Chamber Opera"

=== Season 41 ===
No. overall	No. in season	Title
340	1	"Orchestrations"
341	2	"Odd Jobs 2"
342	3	"Specialty Props"
343	4	"Expansive Technology"
344	5	"Documentary Theatre"
345	6	"Devised Theatre"
346	7	"Before the Show: Zulema Clares"

=== Season 42 ===
No. overall	No. in season	Title
347	1	"Creating in Quarantine"
348	2	"Play at Home"
349	3	"The 24 Hour Plays Viral Monologues"
350	4	"Creating the Show"
351	5	"Virtual Theatre in the Classroom, American Conservatory Theater"
352	6	"Virtual Theatre in the Classroom, SUNY New Paltz"

=== Season 43 ===
No. overall	No. in season	Title
353	1	"A Community Comes Together - Carnegie Mellon University"
354	2	"Radial Park at Hallets Point"
355	3	"The Seagull on the Sims 4"
356	4	"Irish Rep - Together in Isolation"
357	5	"Ratatouille on TikTok"

=== Season 44 ===
No. overall	No. in season	Title
358	1	"Phantom Returns"
359	2	"Live: Company Part 1 and 2"
360	3	"Pressing On - Girl From the North Country"
361	4	"Taking Chances - Titanique The Musical"

=== Season 45 ===
No. overall	No. in season	Title
362	1	"Setting the Show - The Year of Magical Thinking"
363	2	"Direction and Design - The Piano Lesson"
364	3	"The Neo-Futurists"

=== Season 46 ===
No. overall	No. in season	Title
365	1	"Camden Rep"
366	2	"Direction and Writing - Appropriate"
367	3	"Circus Arts, Acrobats & Choreo - Water for Elephants"

=== Season 47 ===
No. overall	No. in season	Title
368	1	"Odd Jobs 3"
369	2	"Theatrical Special Effects"
370	3	"Bilingual Theatre - GALA Hispanic Theatre"

=== Season 48 ===
No. overall	No. in season	Title
371	1	"Classics & Community"
372	2	"Adaptation & Collaboration"
373	3	"Making the Moment; Heated Rivalry"

== Notable guests ==
- Actors/Actresses
  - Nathan Lane, Cherry Jones, Matthew Broderick, Lea Salonga, Phylicia Rashad, Natasha Richardson, Jessica Lange, Brian Stokes Mitchell, Jennifer Ehle, Adam Pascal
- Producers
  - Emanuel Azenberg, Jeffrey Seller, Harold Prince
- Playwrights
  - Edward Albee, Tony Kushner, David Henry Hwang
- Composers/Lyricists
  - Mary Rodgers, David Yazbek
- Directors/Choreographers
  - David Esbjornson, Julie Taymor, Moises Kaufman
- Lighting/Sound/Set/Costume Designers
  - Lighting: Beverly Emmons, Jules Fisher, Natasha Katz, Howell Binkley
  - Sound: David Meschter, Abe Jacob
  - Scenic: David Rockwell, Eugene Lee
  - Costume: Mary Peterson, Ann Roth

== Awards and recognition ==
- 2015 - W3 Awards: Online Video - Documentary (win - silver award)
- 2016 - Webby Award: Online Film & Video: Documentary, Series (nomination)
- 2016 - Brooklyn Webfest (win)
- 2016 - Telly Award: Documentary (win - silver telly)
- 2017 - Brooklyn Webfest (nomination)
- 2017 - Telly Award: Documentary (win - bronze telly)
- 2017 - Daytime Emmy: Outstanding Special Class Series (nomination)
- 2018 - Webby Award: Online Film & Video: Documentary, Series (nomination)
- 2019 - Daytime Emmy: Outstanding Directing Special Class (nomination)
- 2019 - Daytime Emmy: Outstanding Special Class Series (nomination)
- 2020 - Daytime Emmy: Outstanding Directing Special Class (nomination)
- 2022- Anthem Awards: Awareness Categories (Not-For-Profit), subcategory Education, Art, & Culture - Special Projects (win)
- 2023- Daytime Emmy: Arts and Popular Culture Program (nomination)
- 2024 -Daytime Emmy: Arts and Popular Culture Program (nomination)
- 2026 -Daytime Emmy: Arts and Popular Culture Program (nomination)

== Related content ==
In 2006, a book series highlighting Working in the Theatre was published by Bloomsbury publishing, and edited by Robert Emmet Long. The series included three books, each highlighting WIT guests' insight to the theatre industry.

- Acting
  - Foreword by Kate Burton
  - Featuring: Brian Dennehy, Matthew Broderick, Nathan Lane, Blythe Danner, Joel Grey, Anne Heche, Dana Ivey, Swoosie Kurtz, Jessica Lange, Brian Stokes Mitchell, Cherry Jones, Tonya Pinkins, Phylicia Rashad, Vanessa Redgrave, Michael Crawford, Mercedes Ruehl, Patrick Stewart, Richard Thomas, Irene Worth, Natasha Richardson, and more
- Producing and the Theatre Business
  - Foreword by Elizabeth Ireland McCann
  - Featuring: Daryl Roth, David Stone, Todd Haimes, Fran Weissler, Mel Brooks, Richard Frankel, Margo Lion, Kevin McCollum, André Bishop, Neil Pepe, Thomas Schumacher, Emanuel Azenberg, Thomas Viertel, Michael David, Susan Gallin, Jeffrey Seller, Barry Grove, Judy Craymer, Robyn Goodman, Harold Prince, and more
- Writing
  - Foreword by Paula Vogel
  - Featuring: Edward Albee, Arthur Kopit, Lisa Kron, Christopher Durang, Marsha Norman, Brian Clark, Terrence McNally, Harvey Fierstein, Juan Guare, August Wilson, Samm-Art Williams, Charles Strouse, Roberto Aguirre-Sacasa, Alfred Uhry, Peter Parnell, Arthur Miller, Robert Anderson, Tony Kushner, David Auburn, Charles Busch, David Henry Hwang, John Patrick Shanley, and more
