= Elodie Lauten =

American classical composer

Elodie Lauten (October 20, 1950 – June 3, 2014) was a French-born American composer described as postminimalist or a microtonalist.

== Biography ==
Born in Paris, France as Genevieve Schecroun, and educated in Paris at the Lycée Claude Monet, the Conservatoire (piano) and the Institut d’Etudes Politiques. Her father was Errol Parker (né Raphaël Schecroun), an Algerian-born jazz musician; her mother was a classical pianist.

Lauten was classically trained as a pianist since age 7. She contributed to the early punk-rock scene in Paris in 1975 and 1976. After relocating to New York City, she received a Master's in composition from New York University where she studied Western composition with Dinu Ghezzo, and Indian classical music with Ahkmal Parwez. She became an American citizen in 1984. She received awards from the NEA, ASCAP, MTC, and the American Music Center, as well as chamber and orchestral commissions.

A writer of operas, theater pieces, orchestral, chamber and instrumental music, she was recognized in North America and Europe as a pioneer of postminimalism and a force on the new music scene with over 20 releases on a number of labels including Lovely Music, Point/Polygram, 4-Tay, O.O. Discs, and New Tone (Italy).

== Musical style ==
Lauten's music was always a combination of two contradictory streams, one a cloudy, beatless stasis derived from minimalism, the other a neoclassical attachment to tonal melody and ostinato. These two were present from the beginning of her recording career, the first in her Concerto for Piano and Orchestral Memory (1984), the second in her Sonata Ordinaire (1986) for piano.

Her 1987 opera The Death of Don Juan—feminist tract and Zen meditation combined—was one of the major postminimalist works of the 1980s; it was revived in April 2005 at Franklin Pierce College (in New Hampshire), directed by Robert Lawson. Her neoclassical tendency blossomed into a full neo-baroque idiom in her Deus ex Machina Cycle for voices and Baroque ensemble (1999). Variations On The Orange Cycle (1991, recorded by Lois Svard for Lovely Music in 1998) is one of the cloudier works, an improvisation in a Terry Riley-ish vein that was recorded and transcribed (as few of her piano works have been) for performance by others. Svard's recording of the work was included in Frank J. Oteri's "The Century List: 100 Reasons to Play This Century's Music", a list of 100 recommended recordings for classic radio programmers distributed at the 1998 Music Personnel in Public Radio conference and subsequently published in Chamber Music magazine in 1999.

Lauten's opera Waking in New York, written on poems by her late friend Allen Ginsberg, was presented by the New York City Opera VOX and Friends 2004, after being released on 4Tay in 2003. Smoothly suave but with a gentle rock beat, the work pioneered a mixture of genres by combining vocal soloists from three styles: classical, Broadway, and gospel. OrfReo, an opera for Baroque ensemble, was premiered at Merkin Hall by the Queen's Chamber Band, who also included Lauten's The Architect in their CD New Music Alive (Capstone, 2004). OrfReo was released on CD in December 2004 (Studio 21). In 2004, she was composer-in-residence at Hope College (in Michigan). Her Symphony 2001 was premiered in February 2003 by the SEM Orchestra in New York.

Lauten was the 2014 recipient of the Foundation for Contemporary Arts' Robert Rauschenberg Award.

== Personal life ==
Genevieve adopted the name "Elodie" after moving to the United States and took the surname Lauten from her first husband. That marriage ended in divorce, as did her second, to Carl Karas. She had no children.

== Death ==
Lauten died in Beth Israel Hospital, Manhattan, aged 63, from cancer.

== Works ==
=== Chamber music ===
- Links, solo flute, 2004
- The Wish of the Quickening Moon, string quartet, 2003
- Sex and Pre-Anti-Post Modernism, contrabass/voice, setting of text by Michael Andre, 2002
- T.E.V.B. (The Elusive Virgin Bachelor), trio (piano, violin, cello), 2002
- Space-Time Sextet, string sextet (3 violins, viola, cello, contrabass), 2001
- Mantra, vocal sextet, 2001
- American Dreamscape, solo piano, 2000
- Lunaticity, Baroque ensemble, 1999
- Prophecy, solo viola, 1999
- Irrational Synergies, baritone, flute, clarinet, saxophone, cello; setting of poems by Gertrude Stein, Ezra Pound, E. E. Cummings, commissioned by The Lark Ascending, 1998
- Discombobulations, electronic, electric guitar, flute, and soprano, lyrics by Steven Hall, 1997
- Variations on the Orange Cycle, solo piano, 1991
- Concerto for Piano and Orchestral Memory, piano, tape, synthesizer, cello, trombone, violin, viola, 1984

=== Dance ===
- The Soundless Sound, electronic, 2004
- She-Wolf, electronic (Fairlight computer), 1987
- Oedipus Rex, electronic/computer (Fairlight), 1984

=== Operas and cycles ===
- The Death of Don Juan, revision of 1985 opera, 2005
- Orfreo, soprano, mezzo, countertenor, baritone, and Baroque orchestra: harpsichord, string quartet, oboe, flute, contrabass; libretto by Michael Andre, commissioned by Harpsichord Unlimited, 2004
- Waking in New York, baritone, soprano, mezzo, full orchestra, libretto by Allen Ginsberg, 2004
- Waking in New York, soprano, mezzo, baritone, string quartet, flute, contrabass, percussion, synthesizer, libretto by Allen Ginsberg, 1999
- The Deus Ex Machina Cycle, two sopranos, baritone, harpsichord, string quartet, flute; libretto by, among others: Lauten, Rilke, Verlaine, Pascal, and Steven Hall, 1995
- Existence, yenor, soprano, mezzo-soprano and narrator, piano, synthesizer, percussion; music and libretto by Lauten, 1990
- The Death of Don Juan, computer generated tape, 4 sopranos, harpsichord, Trine (custom lyre), cello, synthesizer, Grand Trine (custom harp); music and libretto by Lauten, 1985

=== Orchestral ===
- Harmonic Protection Circle, 2003
- Symphony 2001, 2000

=== Soundtracks ===
- Crossroads Variations, solo piano, 2004
- Harmonic Protection Circle 2004, synthesizer, electric guitar, percussion, contrabass, 2004
- Harmonic Protection Circle 2003, Trine, electric guitar, 2003
- The Mystery of the Elements, piano, electronic, 2002
- S.O.S.W.T.C., electronic, 2001
- Double X, electronic, voice, flute, 1999
- Inscapes from Exile, electronic, 1995
- Tronik Involutions, electronic, 1993
- Remembrance of Things Past, electronic, cello, music for sound installation based on the writing of Marcel Proust, 1988
- Untitled , 5 pieces for live Fairlight computer, electric violin, cello, Trine, piano; commissioned by the Lincoln Center Serious Fun Series, 1988
- Blue Rhythms, piano and electronic, 1987
- Krash Music, electronic, singers, 1986
- Sonate Ordinaire, solo piano, 1986
- Sonate Modale, piano and tape, 1985
- Action Music, piano and sound environment, 1985
- Music for the Trine, a custom-designed amplified lyre, electronic, Trine, voice, cello, 1985
- Magnetic Fields, electronic, Trine, 1985
- The Soundless Sound, electronic, 1984
- The Enigma of a Lovely/Loveless Existence, concrete, Casiotone, voice, 1983
- Piano Works, piano, concrete, synthesizer, 1983

== Discography ==
. Orchestre Modern (1981). Rockin' Horse: 2013

- Tronik Involutions: From the Gaia Cycle Matrix a Work in Umi (1995/1996). Studio 21/OO Discs: 7108. Composed and performed by Elodie Lauten.
- The Deus Ex Machina Cycle: New music for voices and Baroque ensemble (1999). 4Tay Inc.: CD 4013.
- Inscapes from Exile (2000). Robi Droli/Newtone: 7004.
