= Meiyin Wang =

American theatre director, playwright, and producer

Meiyin Wang (Chinese: 王美尹) is an American theatre director, playwright, and producer. She was the festival director of the Without Walls (WOW) festival at the La Jolla Playhouse in San Diego and co-director of the Public Theater's Under the Radar Festival and Symposium in New York.
