= Washboard Jungle =

- Origin: New York City
- Genres: folk; class rock; comedy; dance; performance art
- Years active: 1989-1994

Washboard Jungle is a four-man group that combines elements of folk music, classic rock, comedy, dance, and performance art. The members include Bob Goldberg (keyboards, accordion, bulbul tarang, percussion, vocals), Henry Hample (banjo, fiddle, mandolin, ukulele, percussion, vocals), McPaul Smith (bass guitar, jug, percussion, vocals), and Stuart Cameron Vance (guitars, kazoo, percussion, vocals). They took their name from the 1955 film Blackboard Jungle.

The group was founded in New York City in 1989 by Henry Hample, the son of noted humorist Stuart Hample. Often referred to as a "post-modern jug band," they've used up to 40 musical instruments and household utensils in their live shows, including washboards, spoons, bongos, pennywhistle, melodica, a potato masher, a carrot grater, a toy hammer, a vacuum cleaner, water glasses, and digital samplers. They reinterpret traditional folk songs, and the songs of other artists ranging from Hoagy Carmichael to Pink Floyd, but also write original songs in a comic vein.

The group has a longstanding relationship with the New York experimental performance space Dixon Place, and has performed at other New York theatrical and music venues, including regular appearances in the "No Shame" series at the Public Theater. They have also toured to festivals, colleges, and other venues from Maine to North Carolina. They sometimes perform for children, and they continue to receive airplay on kids' radio programs. They officially disbanded in 1994 but have reunited several times since.

A poster advertising the band is visible briefly during a scene in the 1993 film Manhattan Murder Mystery, behind Woody Allen's character.

== Discography ==
- The Wash Cycle, 1994
- The Brown Album, 2000
- Sunnyland, 2016
