= What Goes Up =

- Theatrical release poster
- Directed by: Jonathan Glatzer
- Written by: Jonathan Glatzer; Robert Lawson
- Produced by: Jonathan Glatzer; R.D. Robb
- Starring: Steve Coogan; Hilary Duff; Olivia Thirlby; Molly Shannon; Josh Peck
- Cinematography: Antonio Calvache
- Edited by: Jennifer Godin; Fenster Itski
- Music by: Roddy Bottum
- Distributed by: Sony Pictures Entertainment
- Release dates: May 8, 2009 (3rd Annual Buffalo Niagara Film Festival); May 29, 2009 (limited)
- Running time: 107 min
- Country: United States
- Language: English
- Box office: $5,290

What Goes Up is a 2009 American comedy-drama film directed by Jonathan Glatzer and starring Hilary Duff, Steve Coogan, Josh Peck, Olivia Thirlby, and Molly Shannon. It was co-written by Glatzer and Robert Lawson and distributed by Sony Pictures Entertainment. Coogan also serves as an executive producer. It premiered on May 8, 2009 at the 3rd Annual Buffalo Niagara Film Festival. What Goes Up was released in the US through Sony Pictures and Three Kings Productions in select theaters on May 29, 2009 and expanded to more theaters the following week. The film grossed $5,290 in its opening weekend, and was panned by critics.

== Plot ==
Upon arriving in Concord, New Hampshire in January 1986 to cover the hometown hooplah for the looming Space Shuttle Challenger launch, with local teacher Christa McAuliffe on the mission's crew, reporter Campbell Babbitt decides to call an old college friend, only to discover an apparent suicide. Babbitt, who has his own ethical baggage, gravitates toward his friend's high-school students in hopes of finding an unsung hero story about a teacher who made a permanent impact on the social misfits of the school. Instead, he discovers a group of dysfunctional students, outcasts led by narcissistic seductress Lucy, repressed voyeur Jim, and scheming pregnant teen Tess. In a gradual reversal of roles, Babbitt soon finds himself learning from this unusual group of kids.

== Cast ==
- Steve Coogan as Campbell Babbit
- Hilary Duff as Lucy Diamond
- Olivia Thirlby as Tess Sullivan
- Molly Shannon as Penelope Little
- Josh Peck as Jim Lement
- Arturo Peniche as Juna
- Manuel Ojeda as Richard
- Cesar Evora as Federico
- Molly Price as Donna Arbetter
- Sarah Lind as Peggy Popoladopolous
- Francisco Gattorno as Carlos
- Angelica Rivera as Daniela
- Laura Konechny as Lute Lement
- Andrea Brooks as Sue
- Ingrid Nilson as Ann
- Brenna O'Brien as the Diminutive Girl
- Max Hoffman as Fenster Itski

== Production ==
The film was originally titled Safety Glass and was first purchased in 1999 by Sunshine Amalgamedia, along with another script by Glatzer. In 2003, Jared Harris and Michelle Williams were cast in undisclosed roles, although neither would end up in the finished product.

== Reception ==
The film was panned by critics. On the review aggregator website Rotten Tomatoes, 14% of 27 critics' reviews are positive. The website's consensus reads: "What Goes Up squanders the charisma of Steve Coogan with a lazy screenplay, contrived plotting, and overall poor production." Metacritic, which uses a weighted average, assigned the film a score of 22 out of 100, based on 10 critics, indicating "generally unfavorable" reviews.

Variety described it as "a pointless and pretentious drama that -- given its title and direct linkage to the 1986 Challenger shuttle disaster—nearly adds tasteless to its unflattering hat trick." The New York Times wrote "There's some nice filmmaking tucked inside 'What Goes Up,' a muddle of moods and intentions." The Chicago Tribune, The Hollywood Reporter, the Los Angeles Times, and several other publications also panned the film. Some critics, however, did offer positive reviews. Andrew O'Hehir of Salon.com describes the film as "a nifty little tragicomedy... dark, droll and sentimental in roughly the correct proportions." Noel Murray from The AV Club wrote, "Glatzer and [co-writer] Lawson show a deep understanding of how common ideals can hold even a community of outsiders together." Pete Hammond of Hollywood.com called it "a darkly funny and wonderfully twisted story that marches to its own surprising beat." Former WNBC critic Jeffery Lyons, who called it a "wonderful little film," invited the movie to be screened at the film festival he curates in Breckenridge, Colorado in June, 2009.

== DVD ==
The DVD was released in the US on June 16, 2009. It features a revised cut from the theatrical release, which is ten minutes longer with different music and a reordering of some of the scenes. The film was also released in the Netherlands with an alternative cover of Hilary Duff from a photo shoot in 2005. Also in the opening sequence, the film has the alternate title Safety Glass.

== Soundtrack ==
The soundtrack for the film was released by independent record label Amherst Records. It was digitally released on iTunes on April 29, 2009 and later on the Nokia Music Store. It was released on May 5, 2009 at Amazon.com's MP3 store. The physical CD was released on July 14, 2009. Hilary Duff's "Any Other Day" was released to radio stations as a single from the soundtrack on May 11, 2009.

=== Track listing ===
What Goes Up (Original Motion Picture Soundtrack)
No.	Title	Artist	Length
1.	"Any Other Day"	Hilary Duff	3:42
2.	"Under Wraps"	The Innocent Bystanders	3:44
3.	"A Hero Mix"	Roddy Bottum	1:20
4.	"New World Anthem"	Jeremy Wall	4:57
5.	"The Truth Is"	Anthony Miranda	3:13
6.	"Blue Straggler"	Electrelane	6:51
7.	"Jesus"	Al Sgro & The Brendan Hines	3:25
8.	"Phonebooth Mix"	Roddy Bottum	3:23
9.	"Two for Joy"	Electrelane	5:50
10.	"Lucy on the Roof Mix"	Roddy Bottum	1:28
11.	"Cut and Run"	Electrelane	3:30
12.	"Campbell Walks Mix"	Roddy Bottum	1:01
13.	"You Make Me Week At the Knees"	Electrelane	3:21
14.	"Heroes"	David Bowie	6:10

Bonus tracks
No.	Title	Artist	Length
15.	"Never Comin' Back"	The Innocent Bystanders	3:55
16.	"Teenage Moment"	The Innocent Bystanders	3:39
17.	"Kids (Who Never Grew Up)"	The Innocent Bystanders	3:18
