= Kyle deCamp =

American performance artist

Kyle deCamp is American multimedia performance artist. A Bessie Award winning performer, she has collaborated with Richard Foreman, The Builders Association, John Kelly, John Jesurun and Chris Kondek among others.
