= TheatreSquared =

Theatre in Fayetteville, Arkansas

- Interactive map of TheatreSquared
- Location: 477 W Spring St., Fayetteville Arkansas
- Coordinates: 36.064608°N 94.165850°W
- Capacity: 275, 120
- Type: Professional Theatre

TheatreSquared, founded in 2005, is a regional professional theatre located in downtown Fayetteville, Arkansas.

TheatreSquared is currently co-led by artistic director Bob Ford and executive director Shannon Jones.

The company stages a full season of productions each year as well a family series and an educational touring show that travels to approximately 80 schools throughout Arkansas, Kansas, Oklahoma and Missouri. The company also hosts the annual Arkansas New Play Fest of emerging works. The affiliated with the national professional actors' union, Actors' Equity Association.In addition to its producing wing, the company's educational outreach program offers a robust summer training academy with production camps featuring Shakespeare and Musical Theatre titles, a professional development institute for Jr. High and High School educators, and student matinees.

In 2011, TheatreSquared was awarded a National Theatre Company Grant from the American Theatre Wing, recognizing the company as one of the nation's ten most promising emerging professional theatres. They were also featured in the American Theatre Wing's Working in the Theatre series on Theatre in Arkansas in 2016.

== History ==
TheatreSquared was founded in 2005 and staged its initial production, Teresa Rebeck's Bad Dates, in 2006. The original founders of the company were Bob Ford, Amy Herzberg, Daniel Hintz, Kassie Misiewicz, and David Pickens. Morgan Hicks joined the company soon after and served as its first managing director. Misiewicz, the original artistic director, left the company in 2007 to found a year-round theatre for young audiences, Trike Theatre. Pickens left the company for individual pursuits. Ford, Herzberg and Hicks remain with the company.

Bob Ford became artistic director in 2007. Martin Miller, a former associate producer at Chicago Shakespeare Theater, joined as executive director in 2009. During his tenure, he oversaw monumental growth and launched an expansive capital campaign that resulted in the construction of the company's current 50,000 square foot campus. Shannon Jones stepped into her leadership role in 2023, when Miller was hired as Executive Director at the McCarter Theatre.

In one decade, the theatre's annual budget grew from $160,000 to $6 million, making it one of the larger cultural institutions serving audiences in Arkansas. Accessibility remained a focus for the company, so in 2016, the theatre launched a new access program called "Lights Up!" with support from the Walmart Foundation, extending free tickets to low-income community members, $10 tickets for youth, and $1 tickets to recipients of SNAP benefits at performances year-round.

The company has placed a strong focus on new work development and premieres, collaborating on new scripts with playwrights including Lee Blessing, Lisa D'Amour, Amy Evans, Sarah Gancher, Barbara Hammond, E.M. Lewis, Mona Mansour, Mary Kathryn Nagle, Qui Nguyen, Jonathan Norton, Bryna Turner, Karen Zacarias, and many others through the Arkansas New Play Festival.

As a playwright-artistic director, Ford has written twelve plays and adaptations for the company, including several co-adaptations with Herzberg, including My Father's War, In the Grove of Forgetting, and the couple's adaptation of Pride and Prejudice.

== Critical Reception and Awards ==
TheatreSquared was a 2011 recipient of the National Theatre Company Grant from the American Theatre Wing, founder of the Tony Awards, in its first year of eligibility. The company is a ten-time grantee of the National Endowment for the Arts. In 2023, TheatreSquared became one of only a handful of theatres outside of New York City to win an Obie Award, receiving a special citation for its on-line co-production of Sarah Gancher's Russian Troll Farm.

The 2025 Governor's Arts Award recognized the Theatre's contribution to Arts Education in Arkansas.

== Facility ==
As part of a $34 million capital campaign, the company completed a 50,000 square-foot facility in mid-2019 that includes two venues, offices, artists' apartments, production workspaces, and the open-all-day Commons Bar-Café. The building is a design collaboration between theatre planners Charcoalblue and New York-based Marvel Architects. Performances were previously held in the 175-seat Studio Theatre at Nadine Baum Studios, through a rental arrangement with the touring arts presenter Walton Arts Center.

The new facility was a 2020 recipient of the American Architecture Award, AIA New York State Honor Award, Interior Design Best of Year Award, and in 2023 both an AIANY Design Award and USITT Architecture Award.
