= Kristine Woods =

American multidisciplinary artist

Kristine Woods is an American multidisciplinary artist known for her work in sculpture and textiles.
