= Everyday Rapture =

- Broadway Playbill cover
- Music: Various Artists
- Lyrics: Various Artists
- Book: Dick Scanlan; Sherie Rene Scott
- Productions: 2009 Off-Broadway; 2010 Broadway

Everyday Rapture is a musical with a book written by Sherie Rene Scott and Dick Scanlan and music by various composers. It ran Off-Broadway in 2009 and opened on Broadway in 2010. The musical is a loose autobiography of Scott herself, showing her travels from her half-Mennonite Kansas childhood to a life in show business.

== Concept ==
The show is called a "stage memoir disguised as fiction" and a "mixed jukebox musical". It features songs by artists including David Byrne, Sharon Jones & The Dap-Kings, Johnny Mercer, and Harry Warren. The Judy Garland standards "Get Happy" and "You Made Me Love You" are sung, the "latter amusingly illustrated with a series of cheeky images of Jesus." Songs from Mister Rogers' Neighborhood are also sung.

Scanlan described the show as "a one-person show with four people in it." Monty Arnold, reviewing for Playbill, added, "The other three, besides Scott, are a younger actor who has an extended YouTube sequence and two women who serve as backup singers — 'The Mennonettes' — and share other scenes with her."

== Production history ==
Everyday Rapture debuted Off-Broadway at the Second Stage Theatre on April 7, 2009, in previews, officially opened on May 3, and closed on June 13, 2009. It starred Sherie Rene Scott with direction by Michael Mayer, choreography by Michele Lynch, and orchestrations and arrangements by Tom Kitt. Featured in the cast were Eamon Foley, Lindsay Mendez, and Betsy Wolfe. Scott was nominated for the Lucille Lortel Award for Outstanding Lead Actress, and the show was nominated for Best Musical.

Scott presented an earlier form of the show titled You May Now Worship Me on March 31, 2008, as a one-night benefit for the Phyllis Newman Women's Health Initiative of The Actors’ Fund.

The show began previews on Broadway at the American Airlines Theatre on April 19, 2010, and officially opened on April 29, 2010. (It was a last-minute replacement for The Roundabout Theatre Company's planned production of Terrence McNally's Lips Together, Teeth Apart, which was canceled when Megan Mullally withdrew after differences with director Joe Mantello.) Following a limited engagement of 85 performances, the show closed on July 11, 2010. The original cast reprised their performances in the Broadway production, Lynch returned as choreographer, and Mayer returned as director while simultaneously directing Green Day's American Idiot. During Everyday Rapture's run, Scott was nominated for the 2010 Tony Award for Best Leading Actress in a Musical as well as Best Book of a Musical, the latter with co-writer Dick Scanlan.

In the summer of 2012, the first production of the musical outside of New York City was held in Kansas City, Missouri, at the Unicorn Theatre directed and choreographed by Jerry Jay Cranford and starring Katie Gilchrist with Christina Burton and Chioma Anyanwu.

== Song list ==
From the original cast recording:

- "The Other Side of This Life" (Overture)
- "Got a Thing on My Mind"
- "Elevation"
- "On the Atchison, Topeka and the Santa Fe"
- "Get Happy"
- "You Made Me Love You"
- Mr. Rogers Medley ("It's Such a Good Feeling", "Everybody's Fancy", "I Like to Be Told")
- "It's You I Like"
- "I Guess the Lord Must Be in New York City"
- "Life Line"
- "The Weight"
- "Rainbow Sleeves"
- "Why"
- "Won't You Be My Neighbor?"
- "Up the Ladder to the Roof"

Bonus Tracks:

- "Remember"
- "Give Me Love (Give Me Peace on Earth)"

== Recording ==
The original cast recording was released by Sh-K-Boom Records on their Ghostlight label. Scott is a co-founder of Sh-K-Boom/Ghostlight Records with her husband, Kurt Deutsch. The cast album is now available to download on iTunes.

== Critical response ==
Ben Brantley's review in The New York Times of the 2009 off-Broadway production stated that "it easily qualifies as one of the year’s most extravagantly entertaining new musicals." Eric Grode, in The Village Voice, commented that "Gifts like [Scott's], especially when packaged and delivered this shrewdly, deserve a kind of worship."

== Awards and nominations ==
=== Original Broadway production ===
Year	Award	Category	Nominee	Result	Ref
2010	Tony Award	Best Book of a Musical	Dick Scanlan and Sherie Rene Scott	Nominated	
2010	Tony Award	Best Performance by a Leading Actress in a Musical	Sherie Rene Scott	Nominated	
2010	Drama Desk Award	Outstanding Musical		Nominated	
2010	Drama Desk Award	Outstanding Book of a Musical	Dick Scanlan and Sherie Rene Scott	Nominated	
2010	Drama Desk Award	Outstanding Actress in a Musical	Sherie Rene Scott	Nominated	
2010	Drama Desk Award	Outstanding Orchestrations	Tom Kitt	Nominated	
2010	Drama Desk Award	Outstanding Sound Design	Ashley Hanson, Kurt Eric Fischer and Brian Ronan	Nominated	
