= Rosanna Gamson =

American dance choreographer

Rosanna Gamson is an American dance choreographer.

== Biography ==
Gamson was born in New York city. Learned composition with Bessie Schonberg, Phyllis Lamhut, and Hanya Holm. She is the artistic director of Rosanna Gamson/World Wide.
