= Brothers McCann =

- Origin: Boston, Massachusetts
- Genres: Folk rock
- Years active: 2007 - Present
- Members: Mike McCann; Pat McCann; Erik White
- Past members: Daniel Bissex (2007 - 2011); Eran Shaysh (2007 - 2011)
- Website: brothersmccann.com

Brothers McCann is an American folk-rock band, formed in 2007 in Boston, Massachusetts. The band consists of Mike McCann, Pat McCann and Erik White.

== Discography ==
- Different Colors, 2009, LP
- Stereo Road, 2013, EP
- Days of Ease, 2014, LP
- Four Tracks, 2020, EP
