= Paul Strickland =

Paul Strickland is an American storyteller and comedian based out of Cincinnati, Ohio. His award winning solo and collaborative performances have been featured at the National Storytelling Festival, comedy clubs, and Fringe Festivals across the United States and Canada. He gained notoriety with his performance 'Ain't True and Uncle False', which received the Best of Fest Award at Cincinnati Fringe Festival in 2013.
