= Alice Reagan =

American theater director

Alice Reagan is an American theater director.

She is an Assistant Professor of Professional Practice at Barnard College, Columbia University in New York, NY.
