= Dick Scanlan =

American writer, director, and actor

Dick Scanlan (born 1960) is an American writer, director, and actor.

== Early life ==
Scanlan was born on April 14, 1960, in Washington D.C. and grew up in suburban Maryland.

== Career ==
=== Publications ===
Scanlan has written articles that have appeared in The New York Times "Arts & Leisure" section, The Village Voice, The New Yorker, Vanity Fair, and Playboy.

His novel Does Freddy Dance was published in 1995.

=== Theatre ===
He played Miss Great Plains in the 1991 musical Pageant.

He is the co-book writer (with Richard Morris) and lyricist of the musical Thoroughly Modern Millie, which premiered on Broadway in 2002, with music by Jeanine Tesori and starring a then unknown Sutton Foster. Millie won the 2002 Tony Award for Best Musical. Scanlan and Tesori also wrote the song "The Girl in 14G" for Kristin Chenoweth's debut CD, Let Yourself Go.

He is the co-writer, with Sherie Rene Scott, of the musical Everyday Rapture, which opened Off-Broadway in May 2009 and again on Broadway on April 29, 2010. He and Scott also co-wrote Whorl Inside a Loop, inspired by their experiences teaching inside a men's correctional facility. Whorl was produced Off-Broadway in 2015, co-directed by Scanlan and Michael Mayer (Scanlan's best friend for 40 years) and was named one of the best plays of the year by New York Magazine.

In 2011, it was announced that Scanlan is reworking the 1960 Meredith Willson musical The Unsinkable Molly Brown to change the fanciful non-fiction plot (originally written by Richard Morris) to a more factual one. The show received its world premiere at the Denver Center Theatre Company in 2014, starring Beth Malone and directed by Kathleen Marshall.

Scanlan was the script consultant to Berry Gordy for Motown: The Musical on Broadway in 2013. In 2015 he was the Artistic Advisor for a new musical, Invisible Thread, at Second Stage Theatre, directed by Diane Paulus.

In 2015, Scanlan directed the staged concert of Little Shop of Horrors at the New York City Center as part of their Encores! Off-Center Series, starring Jake Gyllenhaal, Taran Killam and Ellen Greene reprising her signature role of Audrey.

== Personal life ==
Scanlan lives in New York City with Alan Effron, his partner since 1996.

He is the co-founder of artsINSIDEOUT, a group of students and established professionals in the performing arts that works with the young people and mothers at Nkosi's Haven, a home in Johannesburg, South Africa for mothers with HIV/AIDS, their children and other children infected or affected by HIV/AIDS.

Scanlan has been HIV-positive since 1983, and was diagnosed with AIDS in 1995. He said: "I never want to imply that I lived because I have a stronger life drive than the people who died. I've lost so many people who I knew to be passionate and committed to their lives." Scanlan emphatically credits his rebound to the anti-HIV drug cocktail, but says, "It is absolutely true that your outlook contributes to your longevity. I chose to keep investing in my future—even when I had no future."

== Awards ==
- 2002 Tony Award Best Book of a Musical, Thoroughly Modern Millie [nominee]
- 2002 Tony Award Best Original Musical Score, Thoroughly Modern Millie [nominee]
- 2002 Drama Desk Award Outstanding Book of a Musical, Thoroughly Modern Millie [nominee]
- 2002 Drama Desk Award Outstanding Lyrics, Thoroughly Modern Millie [nominee]
- 2010 Tony Award Best Book of a Musical, Everyday Rapture [nominee]
- 2010 Drama Desk Award Outstanding Book of a Musical, Everyday Rapture [nominee]
