= C.S.P.S. Hall (Cedar Rapids, Iowa) =

- U.S. National Register of Historic Places
- U.S. Historic district – Contributing property
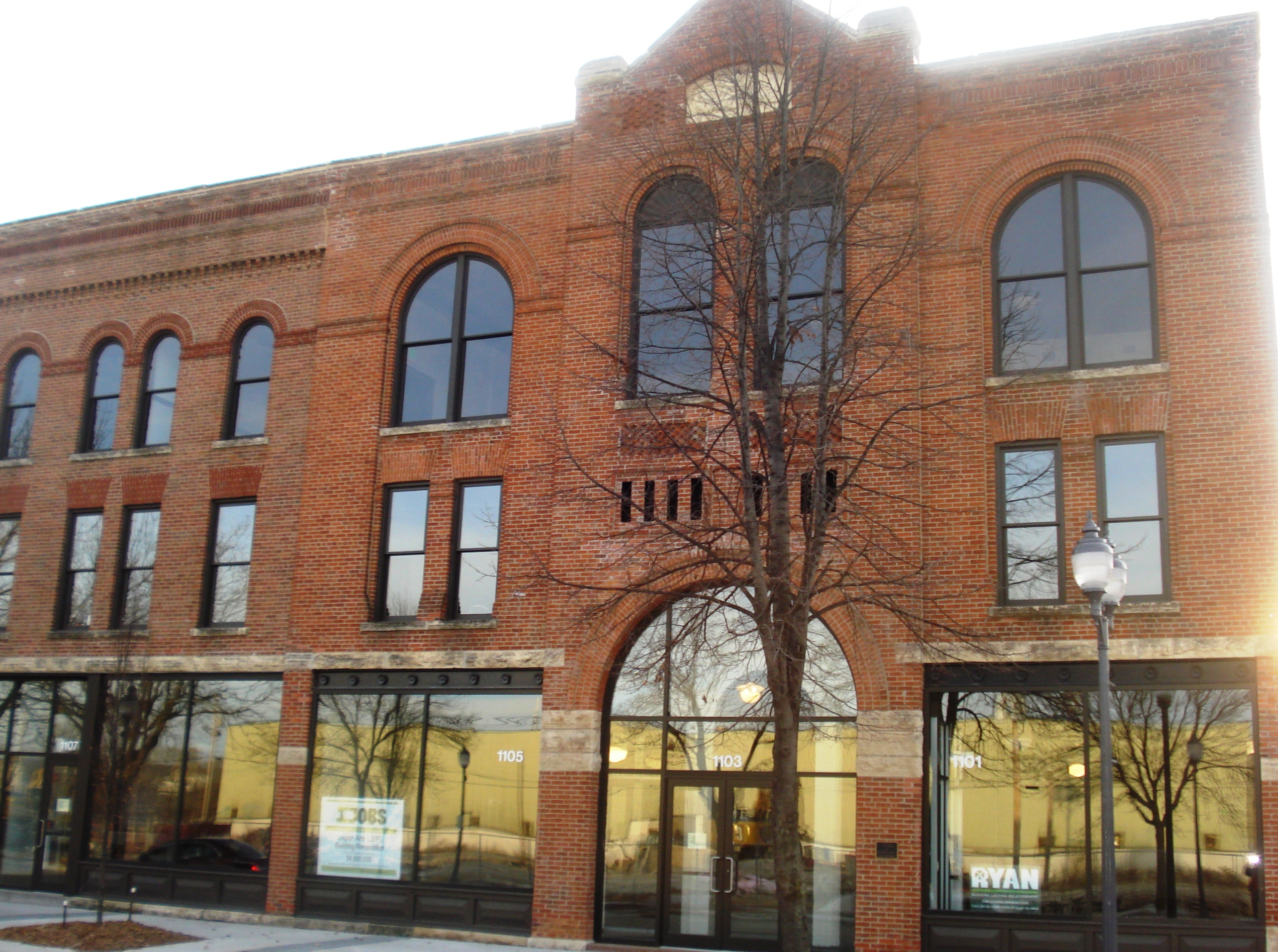

- Location within Iowa Location within the United States
- Location: 1103 3rd St., SE; Cedar Rapids, Iowa
- Coordinates: 41°58′15″N 91°39′31″W
- Area: less than one acre
- Built: 1890-91, 1900, 1908
- Architectural style: Richardsonian Romanesque
- Part of: Bohemian Commercial Historic District (ID02001539)
- NRHP reference No.: 78001237
- Added to NRHP: November 29, 1978

The C.S.P.S. Hall in Cedar Rapids, Iowa, USA was built during 1890-91 and expanded twice in the next two decades. It was a social and cultural center of the local Czech-Slovak Protective Society (C.S.P.S.). The building was individually listed on the National Register of Historic Places in 1978. In 2002 it was included as a contributing property in the Bohemian Commercial Historic District.

The C.S.P.S. was an organization that began with offering a kind of insurance to members. The first lodge of the C.S.P.S. in Cedar Rapids was founded in 1879 and there were three by 1882.

The building is a local adaptation of Richardsonian Romanesque architecture.

The building was damaged in the 2008 flooding of Cedar Rapids, but underwent a major renovation in 2011 that preserved its historic character.

Beginning in 1992, the building was used by Legion Arts, a nonprofit organization, to offer visual art displays, theatre, and concerts. This mission was taken over in 2020 by a new non-profit called CSPS Hall.

== See also ==
- Czecho Slovakian Association Hall (Iowa City, Iowa), also NRHP-listed, built in 1900
