= Jonathan Glatzer =

American writer, director, and producer (born 1969)

Jonathan Glatzer (born 21 October 1969) is an American writer, director, and producer.

== Life and career ==
Glatzer is a television writer and producer for such shows as Succession, Better Call Saul, Bloodline, and Bad Sisters. Along with his fellow writers, he has received a Primetime Emmy Award, two Peabody Awards, a Golden Globe and a WGA award and has been nominated for two Primetime Emmys, and six WGA awards.

Glatzer's first feature film as director, co-writer and producer was What Goes Up. The film stars Steve Coogan, Olivia Thirlby, Hilary Duff, Molly Shannon and Josh Peck.

Glatzer grew up in North Caldwell, NJ and began his career in theater as a director, staging productions at such venues as the Oxford Playhouse in England, the Shakespeare Theatre Company in Washington, D.C., and the Ensemble Studio Theatre in New York. He attended Colgate University and graduated in 1991. He then attended Columbia University's Film School, where his short Prix Fixe won the school's best film award.

In June 2024, AMC ordered a new Silicon Valley-set drama series from Glatzer directly to series. The series was later revealed as The Audacity for a premiere in April 2026.
