= David Leslie (performance artist) =

American performance artist and stuntman

David Leslie is an American performance artist and stuntman.
