= Stupid Kids =

Play by John C. Russell

- Original language: English
- Written by: John C. Russell
- Characters: Judy Noonan; Jim Stark; John "Neechee" Crawford; Jane "Kimberly" Willis

Premiere
- Date: August 25, 1998
- Place: Century Center for the Performing Arts; New York City

Stupid Kids is a play by John C. Russell (1963–1994), first published by Dramatists Play Service, Inc. of New York, and first performed in 1991. Very similar in tone, plot, and characters to the film Rebel Without a Cause, the play follows four students at Joe McCarthy High.

Subsequent to its New York run, it played in Seattle and Boston.

== Plot ==
Jim has a crush on Judy and Judy's boyfriend Buzz is a popular jock. After a police raid on a rave, Jim makes friends with Neechee (a fey kid who has nicknamed himself after Nietzsche) while Judy befriends punkish riot grrrl Kimberly. As Jim and Judy pursue each other through the unpleasant social procedures of high school, abandoning their rebellious nature in favor of comfortable conformity, Neechee and Kimberly fall unhappily in love with them—Neechee with Jim, Kimberly with Judy. Ultimately, their experience alienates them even further from the mainstream, and from the objects of their affection.

== Characters ==
- Jim Stark - a masculine, disaffected and apparently rebellious teenager who is new in town and intrigued by Judy
- Judy Noonan - a feminine, provocative, and apparently rebellious teenager who is intrigued by Jim
- John "Neechee" Crawford - a young gay outcast who is desperately in love with Jim
- Jane "Kimberly" Willis - a young gay outcast who is desperately in love with Judy
