= Victoria Marks =

Victoria Marks (born 1956) is a professor of choreography in the Department of World Arts and Cultures at UCLA, where she has been teaching since 1995. Before taking her post at UCLA she lived in London, where for three and a half years she worked on her own choreographic projects and served as head of choreography at London Contemporary Dance School, a conservatory for the training of professional dance artists in Europe. She led her own dance company, the Victoria Marks Performance Company in the 1980s.

In the 1980s and early 1990s, Marks started the Victoria Marks Performance Company in New York. In 1987 and 1988 she went to London on a Fulbright Fellowship in choreography. She returned to London again in 1992 to run the choreography program at the London School of Contemporary Dance where she began making works for individual artists. Marks began her work with mixed-ability dancers in 1992 when Margaret Williams asked her to create a dance for the camera with the mixed-ability company CandoCo. Marks hoped to change the audiences view of disabilities by portraying them as sexy, smart, funny, and powerful. Her work forces the audience to rethink society’s aesthetic expectations on dance, challenging the audience to explore the possibilities in theatrical dancing involving disabled bodies. of Marks loves creating movements that communicate ideas and change peoples perspectives.

== Works ==
=== Stage ===
- Action Conversations (2008) Based on a workshop run by Marks that allowed veterans to talk about their experiences and work through difficulties with exercises and dance. Deals with what it is like to be a soldier.
- Not about Iraq (2008)
- Dancing to Music (1988)
- Dust

=== Film ===
- Veterans – Five veterans dealing with PTSD in Los Angeles, and dealing with flashbacks of war as they try to go on living their lives.
- Men (1997) – Seven men in their 60s and 70s from various backgrounds.
- Mothers & daughters – Ten pairs of actual mothers and daughters and what is the same and what is unique in each pair.
- Outside In (1994) – The first collaboration between Marks and director Margaret Williams with the CandoCo Dance Company. Included six disabled and non-disabled dancers.

== Reviews of her work ==
- Lewis Siegel: (Los Angeles Times, August 6, 2005) "Victoria Marks is a spoiler, a troublemaker, a true subversive"
- Sara Wolf: (Dance Magazine, July 21-August 6, 2005) In a review of the NOW Festival, 2005 "Additional high points were Victoria Marks’ Not About Iraq and On Forgetting, companion dances that questioned the role of art during wartime. If it can accomplish anything, Marks seemed to answer, it is to expose the false sanctuary it offers."
- Sara Wolf: (LA Weekly, June 14, 2002) "Marks says her trio isn’t so much about September 11 as it is about impotence in the face of the inevitable, but the unforgettable events of that day plangently ring through the appropriately named "Against Ending’s" driven at full tilt movement. Part civic conversation and part tantrum, the piece has a scale and urgency that may surprise those more familiar with Marks’ dance films or her understated portraiture pieces, in which incremental shifts in intention (a look here, a mere twitch of a gesture there) reveal volumes. Another downtown New York choreographer who moved here sans company, Marks is one of the LA’s best-kept secrets. On one level the postmodernists’s intelligent, complex and witty work is always a statement about dance making…."
- Elizabeth Zimmer: (The Village Voice, January 17, 1996) "...A choreographer of superior intelligence, lyricism, and wit...."
- Sophie Constanti: (The Dancing Times (U.K.), January 1994) "Marks can focus your attention ..ment alone, yet she can also show you how pure dance is unavoidably shaped by human emotion, by a particular performer, by group dynamics and by how we choose to respond to these aspects of dance, of theatre, of people."
