= Annabelle Gamson =

American dancer and choreographer (1928–2023)

Annabelle Gamson (born Annabelle Gold, August 6, 1928 – August 1, 2023) was an American dancer and choreographer. Although she worked in ballet, Gamson was particularly known for her work within modern dance. As a dancer, she drew particular acclaim for her interpretations of the works of Isadora Duncan, Mary Wigman, and Eleanor King.

== Biography ==
Annabelle Gold was born in The Bronx, New York to Russian Jewish immigrants Solomon and Rose Gold. She studied dance with Julia Levien, a pupil of Anna Duncan, from ages five to twelve. She then attended the Fiorello H. LaGuardia High School of Music & Art and Performing Arts and the Professional Children's School. She also studied under May O'Donnell, Helene Platova, and at the Katherine Dunham School. By sixteen, she was already making a living as a dancer.

In 1949, she made her Broadway debut in Richard Lewine's musical revue Make Mine Manhattan at the Broadhurst Theatre. She returned to Broadway the following year to appear in Morton Gould's Arms and the Girl at the 46th Street Theatre. Shortly after that production closed, Gamson moved to Paris to study under Etienne Decroux.

Gamson returned to New York City in 1953, at which time she began to appear regularly with the American Ballet Theatre where she notably danced the role of the cowgirl in Aaron Copland's and Agnes DeMille's Rodeo. She also worked and performed with Anna Sokolow on Broadway and portrayed Sonya in the original production of Rodgers and Hammerstein's Pipe Dream. Gamson also worked as a dancer for several television productions during the 1950s.

On November 21, 1958, Gamson married conductor Arnold Gamson who was at that time the principal conductor of the American Opera Society. Arnold left his position at the AOS in 1961 to pursue a conducting career in Europe. The couple moved to Europe and lived and worked there for the next several years. During this time, they began to have children. In the mid-1960s, the Gamsons returned to the United States and settled in Westchester County, New York. Annabelle spent the next several years devoted to raising their children, Rosanna and David, who is a record producer renowned for his work with Scritti Politti.

In the early 1970s, Gamson continued with further studies under Levien, focusing on the work of Isadora Duncan. In 1974 she presented a highly lauded program of Duncan works at the American Theater Laboratory in New York City. Critic Rose Anne Thom wrote of her performance that,

"Through her extraordinary performances, Gamson gave audiences the opportunity to understand and appreciate the craftsmanship of Duncan's choreography, forever doing away with the rumor that Duncan's dances were improvised. To generations of dance lovers, for whom Duncan was a legend previously accessible only through writings and artistic representation, Gamson imbued the dances with a musicality and dynamic spirit that, while never intending to mimic Duncan, gave some sense of what was essential in Duncan's choreography and the apparent spontaneity of her performance."

Following this critical success, Gamson drew further acclaim for her performances of the works of German expressionist Mary Wigman and American choreographer Eleanor King. She also presented a number of her own pieces and spent much of her time teaching younger performers.

== Personal life and death ==
Annabelle Gamson was married to renowned conductor Arnold Gamson, and their daughter, Rosanna Gamson, is also a celebrated dancer. Her son is music producer and songwriter David Gamson, formerly a member of Scritti Politti.

Annabelle Gamson died on August 1, 2023, at the age of 94.
