= La Grande-Duchesse de Gérolstein discography =

This is a list of recordings of La Grande-Duchesse de Gérolstein, an opéra bouffe (a form of operetta), in three acts and four tableaux by Jacques Offenbach to an original French libretto by Henri Meilhac and Ludovic Halévy. The work was first performed in Paris on 12 April 1867.

The following recordings are in French unless otherwise indicated.

== Recordings ==
| Year | Cast (Grand Duchess, Fritz, Prince Paul, General Boum, Wanda) | Conductor, Opera house and orchestra | Label |
|---|---|---|---|
| 1958 | Eugenia Zareska; André Dran; Jean Mollien; John Riley; Gisèle Prévet | René Leibowitz; Pasdeloup Orchestra; Choeur Lyrique de Paris | LP: Urania; Cat: 5115; CD: Preiser Records; Cat: 90591 |
| 1959 | Jennie Tourel; André Turp; Louis Quilico; Martial Singher; Laurel Hurley | Arnold Gamson; American Opera Society (recorded at Carnegie Hall in Nov) | LP: Unique Opera Records; Cat: 241 |
| 1966 | Suzanne Lafaye; Jean Aubert; Christian Hasse; Henri Bédex; Michèle Raynaud | Jean-Claude Hartemann; Monthabor orchestra & chorus | CD: Accord; Cat: 465 871-2 |
| 1967 | Éliane Lublin; Raymond Amade; Christos Grigoriou; Jean-Christophe Benoît | Jean-Pierre Marty; Orchestre de la Société des Concerts du Conservatoire | LP: Pathé; Cat: 130568 |
| 1972 | Huguette Tourangeau; John Walker; Richard Stilwell; Donald Gramm; Susan Belling | John Crosby; The Santa Fe Opera orchestra & chorus (recorded on 22 July; sung in English) | CD: EMI; Cat: 7 63415-2. |
| 1976 | Régine Crespin; Alain Vanzo; Charles Burles; Robert Massard; Mady Mesplé | Michel Plasson; Orchestre national du Capitole de Toulouse; Choeur du Capitole de Toulouse | CD: Sony; Cat: SM2K 62583 |
| 1984 | Enriqueta Tarrés; Adolf Dallapozza; Josef Protschka; Alexander Malta; Saskia Gerritsen | Pinchas Steinberg; WDR Symphony Orchestra Cologne; WDR Rundfunkchor Köln (sung in German) | CD: EMI; Cat: 66373 |
| 1996 | Lucia Valentini Terrani; Carlo Allemano; Richard Plaza; Etienne Ligot; Carla Di Censo | Emmanuel Villaume; Orchestra Internazionale d'Italia Opera; Bratislava Chamber chorus | CD: Dynamic; Cat: 173/1-2 |
| 2005 | Felicity Lott; Yann Beuron; Éric Huchet; François Le Roux; Sandrine Piau | Marc Minkowski; Les Musiciens du Louvre (recorded at Théâtre du Châtelet in Dec) | CD: Virgin Classics; Cat: 0724354573422; DVD: Virgin Classics; Cat: 0094631023996 |
