= Julia Levien =

American dancer, dance teacher, and choreographer

Julia Levien (October 9, 1911 – September 3, 2006) was an American dancer, dance teacher, and choreographer. She was an expert on the dances of Isadora Duncan and taught Duncan's style of dance. She was a dance pupil of Isadora Duncan’s student Anna Denzler, who danced under the stage name Anna Duncan, and founded the Duncan Dance Guild in the 1950s and the Duncan Centenary Company in 1977. Levien died at the age of 94 at her home on Roosevelt Island. One of her pupils was dancer Annabelle Gamson.

== Education ==
Julia Levien started dancing at a very young age;at around four or five, she heard the piano in movies and when she would hear the piano being played, she thought it was time to dance so she would love to dance to the piano. Levien's family home was a place where Yiddish writers and artists would meet. Her parents would not prohibit her from studying dance but encourage her to study Isadora, and Julia created her own dances. Levien's first teacher was Estelle Harreton, who taught Levien the elements of dance she learned from Isadora Duncan. Around 1920, Levien danced for a class of children whom Harreton had assembled. Levien was nine years old when she started taking dance classes with Harreton in Manhattan. Levien never thought of herself as wanting to become a dancer; she wanted to dance because it was natural.

Levien performed in "Ave Maria", which Isadora choreographed. Levien as not raised to be religious but was aware of her Jewish background. Later, in Levien's first performance with Irma Duncan, she had to learn Russian songs and attempted to sing. In 1923, Levien discovered Anna Duncun, who taught at Carnegie Hall, and be involved with Duncan's circle. Levien performed with Anna Duncan at the Lewiston stadium. After Isadora Duncan died in 1927, Irma went to New York with her Russian company; the company later went back to Russia but Irma stayed in New York. Levien was one of the ten dancers who were chosen to replace the Russian dancers. The group was then developed and were called the American Isadora Duncun School and Company.

For about five years, Levien went on a tour of Cuba and the United States with Irma, and had a pianist perform with the company. Both Anna Duncun and Irma taught Levien a dance must look spontaneous, whether or not the dancer had performed it beforehand.

== Career ==
One of the dancers Julia Levien taught moved to California and was on tour with Alvin Ailey. Ailey could not stop talking about Isadora Duncan because Duncan changed her outlook on dance so she asked Levien if she could perform something for them. Levien said:

... the dancers were not absolutely perfect. If you weren't a Duncun dancer, they were true to the choreography. Some of the lines were still a little different because they didn’t get the exact training, in time that could have been erased. I was satisfied with this experience. Moved on to the next aspect of that and this seemed to serve that. In the beginning it was very difficult. Some were willing to work but some were thinking they were too good for the style, or in other words, 'thought they already were Isadora'. Then they were surprised that it is a big deal to learn and to unlearn.

When she was 50, Levien had to transmute herself because she could not do anything Isadora Duncan did in a small way. She believed at this point in life it is important for young dancers to have experience of Duncan and her practice. During the 1950s, Levien formed a company called the Duncun Guild with Hortense and Gemze DeLappe. Duncan's techniques were well portrayed in that time and movement. Levien taught and coached there for many years. Levien later married and moved to Far Rockaway, where she raised a son named Elliot, and continued to perform and teach. Levien died at the age of 94 in 2006 while she was still teaching, coaching and performing the Duncan style.

== Family ==
Julia Levien was the daughter of Russian parents, both of whom were Jewish intellectual immigrants and were involved in the arts, including music, dance, poetry and theater; and were also Yiddish literature writers. They went to America as young adults. Her father worked in a theater.
