= Levien =

Levien is a surname. Notable people with the surname include:

- David Levien (born 1967), American screenwriter, novelist, director and producer
- Hannah Levien, Australian actress and writer
- Jason Levien (born 1971), American sports executive
- Jonas Levien (1840–1906), Australian politician
- Julia Levien (1911–2006), American dancer, dance teacher and choreographer
- Meredith Kopit Levien (born 1971), American media executive
- Norman Joseph Levien (1871–1967), New Zealand army officer
- Raph Levien, American software programmer
- Robert Levien (1849–1938), Australian politician
- Sonya Levien (1888–1960), Russian-born American screenwriter
