= Elizabeth Duncan (dancer) =

American dancer and dance teacher (1871–1948)

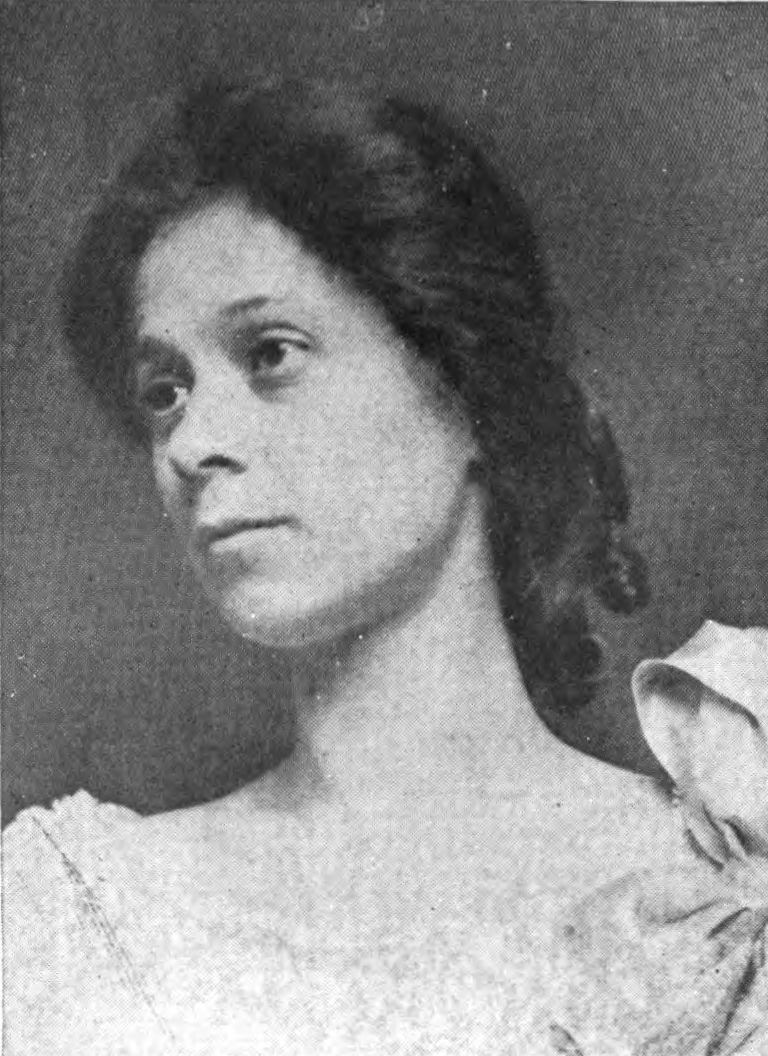
- Born: November 8, 1871; San Francisco, California, United States
- Died: December 1, 1948 (aged 77); Tübingen, Germany
- Occupations: Dancer, teacher
- Partner: Max Merz
- Relatives: Augustin Duncan (brother); Raymond Duncan (brother); Isadora Duncan (sister)

Elizabeth Duncan (November 8, 1871 – December 1, 1948) was an American dancer and dance teacher from California who spent much of her life in Germany and the Soviet Union. The elder sister of Isadora Duncan, she dedicated her life to improving dance education and honoring of her sister's legacy. Elizabeth Duncan operated Isadora Duncan's schools during the latter's life.

== Life and career ==
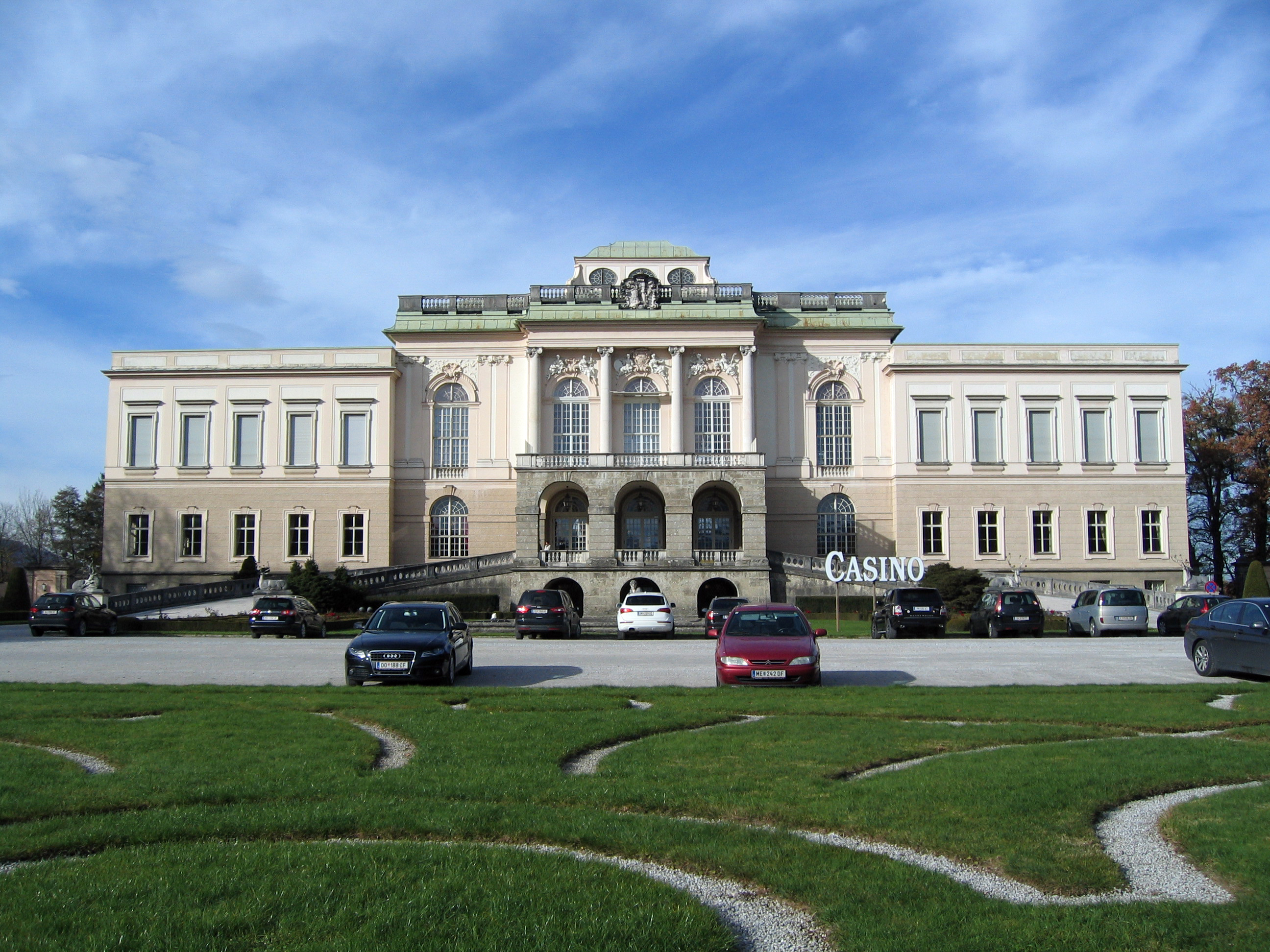
Kleßheim castle: Home of Elizabeth Duncan and her school from 1925 to 1935

Elizabeth Duncan was the oldest child of Joseph Charles Duncan (1819–1898), a banker, and Mary Isadora Gray (1849–1922). Her younger siblings were Augustin, Raymond, and Isadora Duncan. Joseph Duncan was involved in illegal dealings, after which the couple divorced and the family became impoverished. The Duncans taught dance lessons to children in Oakland to earn extra income. Elizabeth Duncan is largely credited with teaching Isadora in their youth, and it was during this time that Isadora developed her style of modern dance and Elizabeth developed her pedagogical style.

The sisters opened their first school in Europe in 1904. Elizabeth then opened a school in Darmstadt in 1911, which relocated to the Hudson Valley area in 1915, to Potsdam in 1921, Salzburg in 1925 until 1935, (Paris in 1930), Munich in 1935, back to Salzburg in 1945, and back to Munich until Duncan's death. Elizabeth attempted a career in performance and had moderate success, but found that her passion lay in teaching. She believed that one could not separate art and life, and thus required both intellectual and physical rigor from her students.

Elizabeth Duncan was also a teacher of the Isadorables, six students hand-picked to study under her sister. Both sisters were concerned with mounting violence in Europe in 1914, which prompted their brief relocation, along with the Isadorables, to the United States. While there, Elizabeth advocated for bringing children orphaned by World War I to America for education. She wrote in a letter to the editor in The New York Times that it was necessary to "attack the problem of race hygiene at its very foundation".

Elizabeth Duncan and her sister Isadora were often estranged. The sisters shared a love of dance and Grecian art; Elizabeth frequently wore togas and sandals. Although hard to assess, it appears that Elizabeth handled the finances of all of Isadora's schools, and would send the dancer money while she was on tour. After Isadora's death, she continued to dedicate her life to her sister's work, continuing to establish schools and ultimately a foundation honoring the Duncan legacy.

== In popular culture ==
Many depictions of Isadora's life include that of her sister. Elizabeth Duncan is a narrator in Amelia Gray's novel Isadora (2017).
