= CGSS =

CGSS may refer to:

- Amilcar CGSS, French sporting car
- Cedar Girls' Secondary School, Singapore
- Command and General Staff School, a military school at Fort Leavenworth, Kansas, U.S.
