= Eva Blažíčková =

Czech dancer and writer

Eva Blažíčková (born 1943) was a pupil of the Czech dancer, choreographer, and teacher Jarmila Jeřábková; she graduated from the dance department of Academy of Performing Arts in Prague and Palucca School of Dance in Dresden (Palucca Hochschule für Tanz). She is currently considered the most prominent Czech follower of Isadora Duncan. In 1972 she took over the studio after Jarmila Jeřábková, forming three dance groups (Chamber Dance Studio I, II, and III) where she worked as a choreographer. In 1990, she founded Dance and Music Education Society (Společnost pro taneční a múzickou výchovu) and in 1992 the Duncan Centre Conservatory where she was the director until 2009. In addition, she founded Nadační fond Isadory Duncan in 1993 and the Jarmila Jeřábková Award (Cena Jarmily Jeřábkové) in 1999. In 2005, she co-founded Vize tance.

In 2016 she began the DUNCAN INSTITUT an umbrella organization for the dance studio and an extensive archive containing authentic historical documents from the estate of Isadora and Elizabeth Duncan, Jarmila Jeřábková, and other personalities who espoused the “Duncan ideas”.

She is the author of more than fifty choreographies, such as Black and White Tears (1979), Crying of the Beloved (1983–1986), Eufemias Mysterion (1986), Špalíček (2009), and Bouquet (2014). In addition to her active teaching activities in the Czech Republic and abroad, she is also the author of the publication Metodika a didaktika taneční výchovy (Methodology and Didactics of Dance Education, 2004) and a co-author of Taneční a pohybová výchova (Dance and Movement Education, 2011).

She was also responsible for the 2010 incorporation of the subject Dance and Movement Education into national primary education program.
