= Jarmila Jeřábková =

Czech dancer, choreographer and teacher

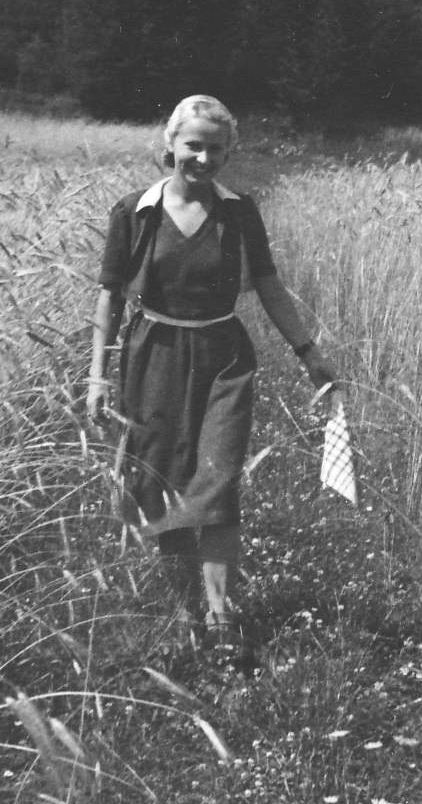
Jarmila Jeřábková in Ledce near Nespeky, circa 1942

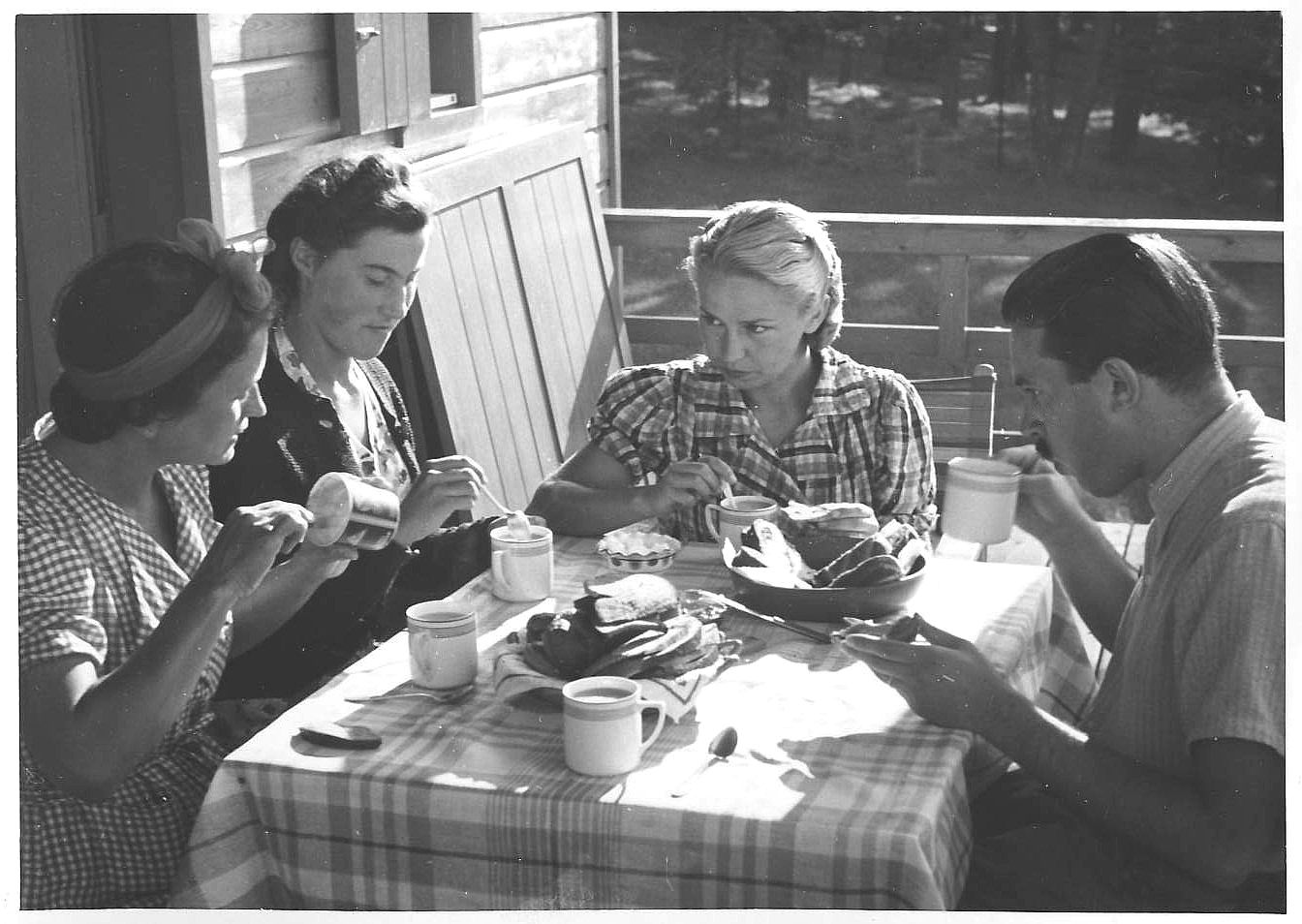
Jarmila Jeřábková, third from left, with two fellow dancers and her husband Ing. Ladislav Mikulík

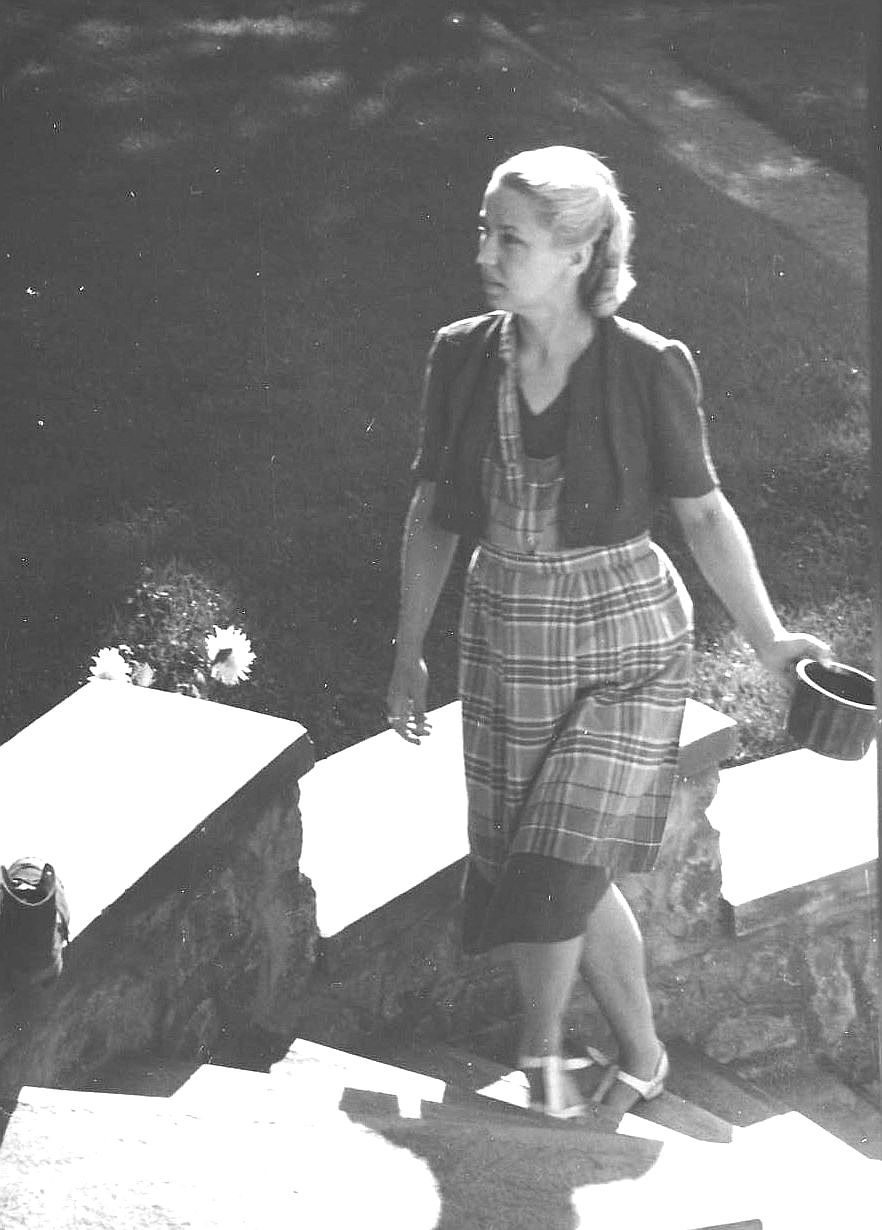
Jarmila Jeřábková in 1942

Jarmila Jeřábková (8 March 1912 – 21 March 1989) was a Czech dancer, choreographer and teacher. She is considered to be a pioneer of Czech modern dance, having taught Isadora Duncan's method from the 1930s.

== Life ==
Born in Prague, she was the daughter of violinist František Jeřábek, the leader of the National Theatre orchestra, while her mother had studied art and music in Munich. Interested in Sokol, the Czech youth sport movement, she took summer classes from 1929 to 1932 at Schloss Klessheim near Salzburg, where she trained in dancing under Elizabeth Duncan, the sister of the innovative dancer Isadora Duncan.

She married Ing. Ladislav Mikulík but kept her surname. They had two sons, Radvan and Zbyněk Mikulík.

== Career ==
From 1932, Jeřábková taught music and dance, first at Slaný, then in Prague where in 1937 her school became known as "Jarmila Jeřábková’s School of Artistic Dance founded under the personal direction of Elizabeth Duncan". Like the Duncans, she also arranged open-air summer courses at Velké Opatovice Castle. From 1935 to 1948, she staged performances with her pupils in Prague and other Czech towns. They included stylized Slavonic dance (performed to the music of Antonín Dvořák's Slavonic Dances) and works accompanying the music of the Czech Choir. Members of the group included Onta Jankovská, Marta Horová, Dáša Bittnerová, Jarina Smoláková, Elvíra Mařatková, Dana Bořkovcová and Běla Dintrová. As a result of socialist nationalization, the school was abolished in 1948 but was later revived as a cultural centre.

From 1949, Jeřábková took up a number of pedagogical and research assignments in body posture, physical education, gymnastics and music. More importantly, she taught children's dance at the State Conservatory (1962-64).

In the 1960s, she revived her classes in Prague, building up a new group of dancers. In 1968, after contacts with the Duncanists, she and her group were invited to perform at the Raymond Duncan's academy in Paris. The following year the presented their programme in Stuttgart at a celebration for Isadora Duncan's 90th anniversary. It was also presented in Prague, Rakovník and Liptovský Mikuláš. In 1972, Jeřábková presented a programme of contemporary music and dance at the Divadlo Komedie in Prague where her group consisted of Eva Blažíčková, Živana Bonušová, L. Dyrová, Ljuba Eremiášová, Helena Metličková, Nea Nováková, Zdena Pilková, Hana Pivcová a Libuše Švábová.

== Legacy ==
Jarmila Jeřábková died in Prague on 21 March 1989, leaving a small but cherished national legacy. She is credited with Isadora Duncan's approach being adopted in Prague. Today, Eva Blažíčková, one of Jeřábková's former colleagues, continues to support her work.
