= Maria-Theresa Duncan =

(1895-1987) concert dancer

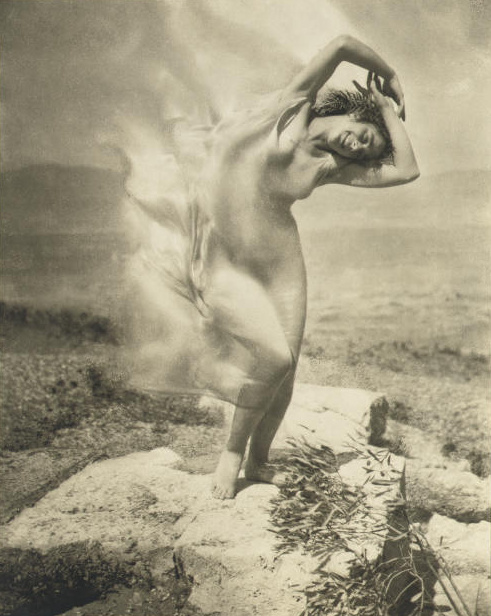
- Thérèse Duncan on the Acropolis, 1921
- Born: Theresa Kruger; April 18, 1895; Dresden, German Empire
- Died: December 14, 1987 (aged 92); New York City, U.S.
- Occupations: Dancer, educator

Maria-Theresa Duncan (1895–1987) was a concert dancer. She is best known as a member of the Isadorables and as a subject for Edward Steichen.

== Biography ==
Duncan was born on April 18, 1895, in Dresden, Germany. In 1904 Maria-Theresa Duncan was discovered by Isadora Duncan. Her parents were persuaded to let their daughter move to Grünewald where she lived at a boarding school and studied dance with Isadora Duncan. Maria-Theresa became part of the dance troupe Les Isadorables. Although it is commonly believed that they were adopted by Isadora Duncan, attempts to legally change their last name to Duncan failed. Maria-Theresa Duncan studied dance under the direction of Isadora from 1905 though 1921.

In the early 1920s Duncan married an art dealer, Stefan Bourgeois, with whom she had two children. Bourgeois died in 1962.

After separating from Isadora Duncan, in 1922 Maria Theresa became a soloist, and discontinued performing Isadora Duncan’s choreography and using the surname Duncan as a stage name. She performed her own choreography from the 1920s until the 1960s using only her first name “Maria Theresa” as a stage name.

Duncan continued dancing through the 1920s and 1930s. She performed at Carnegie Hall, as well as a command performance at the White House for Franklin and Eleanor Roosevelt. She founded a dance company named the Heliconiades and opened a dance academy.

Edward Steichen used Maria-Theresa Duncan as a subject of photographs, notably The Arms of Maria Theresa Against the Background of the Erectheum and Wind Fire.

Duncan taught and danced throughout the 1950s when she performed the Festival Cycle. In the 1960s she performed Farewell to the Dance.

Duncan died on December 14, 1987, in New York City.
