= Irma Duncan =

Dancer and teacher of dance (1897–1977)

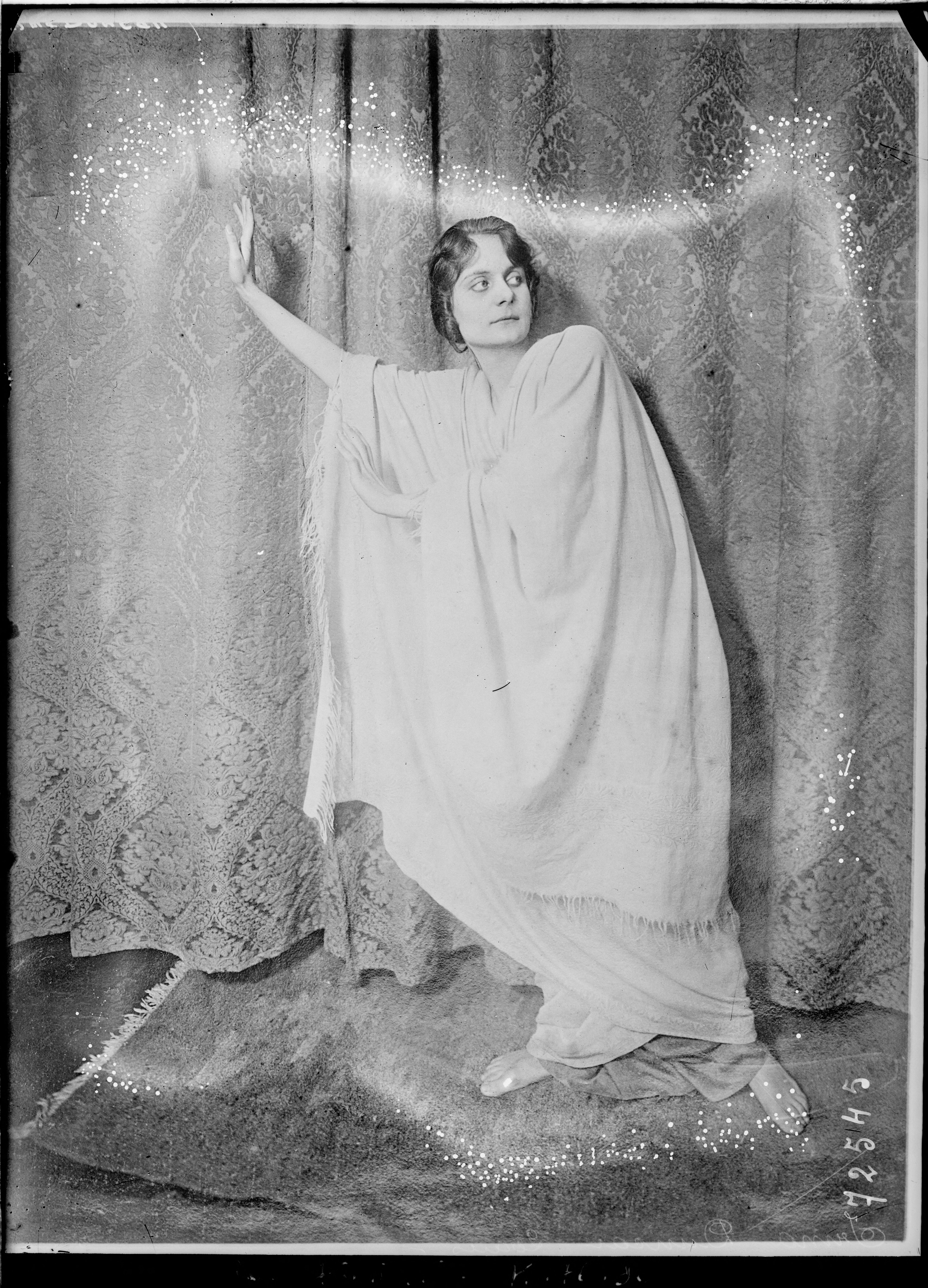
- Duncan at age 20 (in 1917)
- Born: Irma Dorette Henriette Ehrich-Grimme; February 26, 1897; Schleswig-Holstein, Germany
- Died: September 20, 1977 (aged 80); Santa Barbara, California, U.S.
- Occupations: Dancer, educator

Irma Duncan (February 26, 1897 – September 20, 1977) was a German-born American dancer and a teacher of dance.

== Biography ==
Duncan (born Irma Dorette Henriette Ehrich-Grimme) was born on February 26, 1897, in Schleswig-Holstein, Germany.

In 1905, she began studying with American-born dancer and choreographer Isadora Duncan at her school in the Berlin suburb of Grünewald, Germany. She was one of six students of Isadora Duncan that became the young dance troupe the Isadorables. The group moved to New York City at the beginning of World War I. At that time, all the students changed their last names to Duncan.

In 1921, she relocated to Moscow where she taught at the Duncan School. She became the director of the school in 1924 when Isadora Duncan left to return to the United States. That group, the Isadora Duncan Dancers of Moscow, toured in the Soviet Union, China and the U.S. At the end of the 1929 U.S. tour, Irma chose to stay in the U.S. rather than return to Moscow.

In 1935, Duncan obtained U.S. citizenship. The same year, she married Sherman S. Rogers.

In 1966, the Wesleyan University Press published her book Duncan Dancer: An Autobiography.

Duncan died on September 20, 1977, in Santa Barbara, California.
