= Allen Oxenburg =

Allen Sven Oxenburg (July 10, 1927 – July 2, 1992) was an American opera director. He notably co-founded the American Opera Society (AOS) in 1950 with conductor Arnold Gamson, serving as the AOS's Artistic Director for two decades. He not only ran the administrative side of the AOS, but also served the company as stage director, program annotator, libretto translator and score editor. His work with the AOS was highly influential in sparking and perpetuating the post World War II bel canto revival, particularly through a number of highly lauded productions of rarely heard works by Gioachino Rossini, Gaetano Donizetti, and Vincenzo Bellini.

== Biography ==
Oxenburg was born in New York City on July 10, 1927. He studied music and linguistics at Columbia University, New York University, and at a number of schools in Canada, France and Germany between 1945 and 1951. He also took classes at the Juilliard School alongside his cousin and fellow student Arnold Gamson. The two young men founded the AOS in 1950 initially as an organization to perform Renaissance music and baroque operas in the space for which those works for written, in the homes of the rich. Oxenburg served as the company's Artistic Director and Gamson as the company's principal conductor. The company's first production was Claudio Monteverdi's L'incoronazione di Poppea for an audience of 50 in the drawing room of a mansion on 5th Avenue in New York City. These smaller concerts quickly became so popular that the AOS had to move to increasingly larger venues, ultimately using Carnegie Hall as the company's home.

Oxenburg had a strong commitment to presenting operas that were rarely performed. As such, the AOS presented many operas to the American public for the first time, including the United States premieres of Benjamin Britten's Billy Budd, Giuseppe Verdi's Giovanna d'Arco, George Frideric Handel's Hercules and Hector Berlioz's Les troyens to name just a few. He also was a shrewd judge of talent and he provided many notable singers with their first opportunity to perform in the New York. Singers who make their New York debut with AOS included Teresa Berganza, Montserrat Caballé, Eileen Farrell, Dietrich Fischer-Dieskau, Maureen Forrester, Marilyn Horne, Leontyne Price, Elisabeth Schwarzkopf, Joan Sutherland, and Jon Vickers among others.

In 1970, Oxenburg was forced to disband the AOS when he was unable to raise the funds necessary to keep the company afloat. He spent the rest of his life working as a rare and antique photographs dealer in Manhattan. He died in 1992 of heart failure at Mount Sinai Hospital.
