= Roman Chatov =

American artist (1900–1987)

Roman Gregory Chatov (1900–1987) was a Russian-born American artist, painter, designer, and illustrator.

== Life ==
Roman Chatov was born in Rostov-on-Don, Russia, to a theater impresario and his wife. He began drawing in his teenage years, including doing magazine illustrations at age 16 and being a military-correspondent painter near the end of World War I. Chatov was first trained in art in Russia and Paris, France.

He moved to New York with his family in 1922 due to the Bolshevik Revolution and Bolshevik victory in the Russian Civil War. Chatov later joined the Art Students League and the National Academy of Art in order to improve his art training and skills. Chatov initially designed costumes and painted murals, including painting murals for the Ford and Palestinian Pavilions at the 1939 New York World's Fair under a commission from the New Deal Works Progress Administration. Among his most notable work was a set of murals for New York City's Russian Tea Room restaurant; these murals are now in the collection of a New York City museum. These successes led to his getting many painting commissions throughout the U.S. afterwards.

Chatov also designed costumes for Florenz Ziegfeld. Dancer Isadora Duncan expressed her admiration for his costume designs, and he painted a silk scarf for her, the scarf that led to her death when it became entangled in the wheel of a moving car.

While in New York, Chatov met many of the most prominent artists and painters in the area, including Willem de Kooning, with whom he shared studio space. Under commission to MGM, Chatov and his brother Constantin painted portraits of famous Hollywood celebrities including Vivien Leigh and Clark Gable. Chatov married Geneva McCormack in 1942.

In his later years, he primarily painted portraits, and also opened an art studio in Atlanta with the help of his brother Constantin. Chatov received the Governor's Award from the Georgia Council for the Arts and Humanities in 1983. He died in 1987 at the age of 86 or 87. His son Marc Chatov (born in 1953) continues in his father's footsteps today by working as an artist and an art instructor.
