= Amilcar CGS =

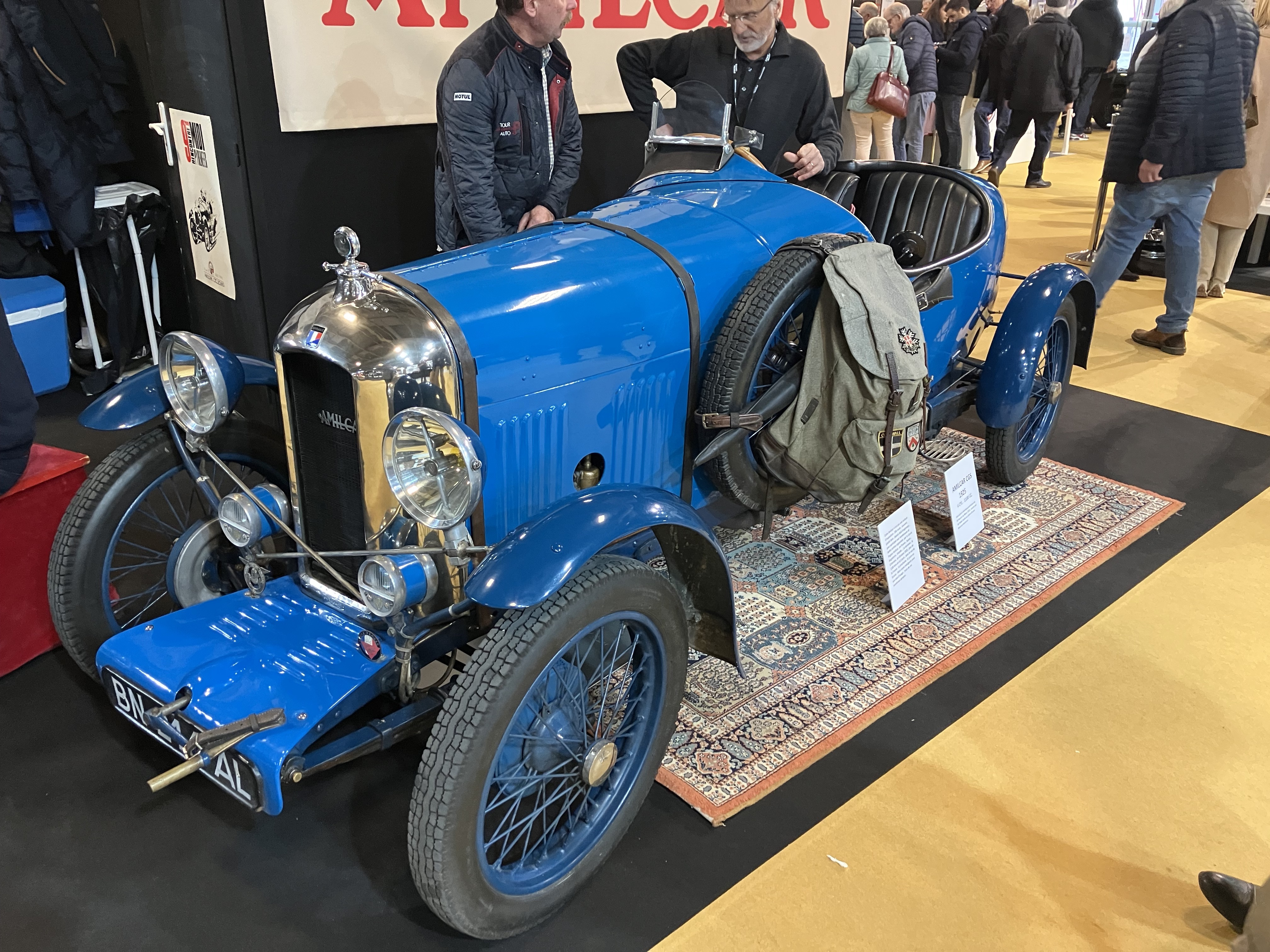
- 1925 Amilcar CGS

Overview
- Manufacturer: Amilcar
- Production: 1923–1925

Body and chassis
- Related: Amilcar CGSS

Powertrain
- Engine: 1,074 cc four cylinder
- Transmission: Three speed manual

Dimensions
- Wheelbase: 96.5 in (2,450 mm)
- Length: 134 in (3,400 mm)

The Amilcar CGS Grand Sport was a popular inter war lightweight sports car, manufactured by the French automobile maker Amilcar between 1923 and 1925. A response to the successful Salmson VAL3 series, the "C Grand Sport" was developed from the Amilcar C. The CGS had a longer, more rigid chassis, and improved brakes in addition to its bigger engine.

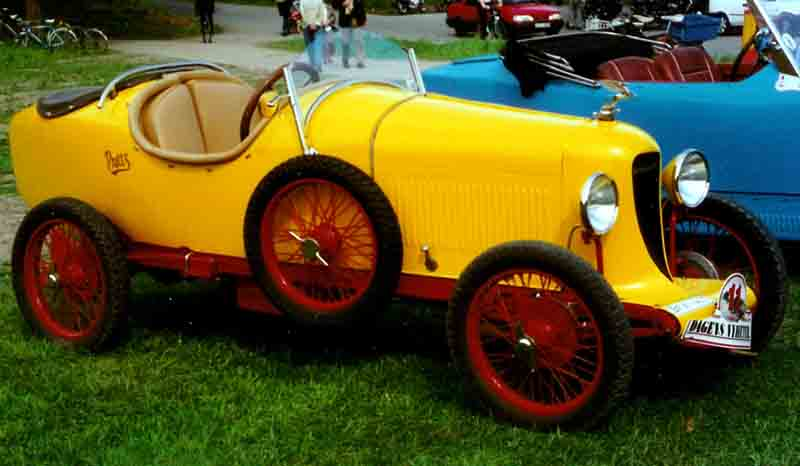
Amilcar CGS-3 3-Seater Sports 1926

Its 1,074cc, 30 bhp, side valve engine with an aluminium head gave it a listed top speed of at least 120 km/h (75 mph), and could be tuned for better performance. Four-wheel brakes were fitted.

A lowered and higher tuned version, the CGSS, the second S standing for surbaisse (lowered), was also made. Around 4,700 of both types were made.

== Racing History ==
=== 24 Hours of Le Mans ===
==== 1924 ====
A single CGS was entered as a works car at the 1924 24 Hours of Le Mans. The car did not finish due to a problem with its oil tank.

==== 1925 ====
A single CGS was entered as a works car at the 1925 24 Hours of Le Mans. French race car driver Marius Mestivier had a fatal accident in the evening which resulted in the car not finishing.
