= Raymond Duncan (dancer) =

American poet

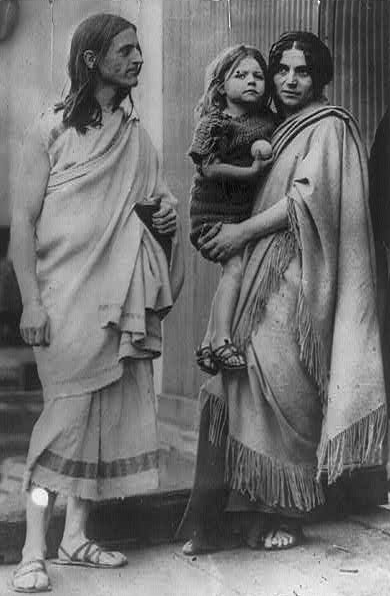
- Duncan with his wife Penelope and son Menalkas in 1912
- Born: November 1, 1874; San Francisco, California, U.S.
- Died: August 14, 1966 (aged 91); Cavalaire-sur-Mer, France
- Occupations: Dancer; artist; poet; artisan; philosopher
- Spouse(s): Penelope Sikelianos (m. 1903; died 1917) Aia Bertrand
- Children: 2
- Relatives: Augustin Duncan (brother); Isadora Duncan (sister); Elizabeth Duncan (sister); Angelos Sikelianos (brother-in-law)

Raymond Duncan (November 1, 1874 – August 14, 1966) was an American dancer, artist, poet, artisan, and philosopher, and brother of dancer Isadora Duncan.

== Biography ==
Born in San Francisco on November 1, 1874, Duncan was the third of the four children of Joseph Charles Duncan (a banker) and of Mary Isadora Gray (the youngest daughter of Thomas Gray, a California state senator). Their other children were Elizabeth, Augustin, and Isadora, a dancer. In 1891, at the age of 17, Raymond developed a theory of movement which he called kinematics, "a remarkable synthesis of the movements of labor and of daily life." He believed that the importance of labor lay in the development of the worker, not in production or in earnings.

In 1898, Duncan, his mother and his brother left America; they lived for a time in London, Berlin, Athens, and Paris. In 1900, he met the German poet Gusto Graeser in Paris, and was deeply impressed by his ideas of natural and simple life. Duncan's theory of movement led him to work particularly closely with his sister Isadora (1877–1927), a dancer. Duncan became particularly fond of Greece; he and his Greek wife, Penelope Sikelianos, lived in a villa outside Athens which was furnished in a historically accurate manner, with many of the furnishings handmade by Raymond, whose craftwork included ceramics, weaving, and carpentry. No one was permitted to enter the villa in modern dress, and the family themselves dressed in classical Greek attire both at home and abroad (which caused some consternation in 1907 Berlin).

In 1909, Raymond and Penelope returned to the United States for a series of performances of classical Greek plays; they toured Philadelphia, Chicago, Kansas City, San Francisco, Portland, and other cities. The couple also gave lectures and classes on folk music, weaving, dancing, and Greek music. They then spent several months in the Pacific Northwest with the Klamath Indians. While they were visiting New York in early 1910, the New York City police took their son Menalkas Duncan to the Children's Society when he was found on the street wearing classical attire.

In 1911, Duncan and Penelope returned to Paris. At 31 Rue de Seine, they founded a school, the Akademia, which offered free courses in their specialty areas of dance, arts, and crafts; they later opened a similar school in London. Each school, based on the idea of the Platonic Academy, was "an open house for every new effort in theatre, literature, music and art". Duncan's ultimate goal was a "complete technique of living" which, by synthesizing work, the arts, and physical movement, would result in the further development of man.

Duncan also wrote poetry and plays, newspaper articles, and editorials expounding his philosophy of "actionalism".

He printed his books on his own printing press using a typeface that he designed himself; the works included La Parole est dans le désert (1920), Poemes de parole torrentielle (1927), L'Amour à Paris (1932), and Etincelles de mon enclume (1957). Duncan's work on his printing press is featured in an interview at the academy for a 1955 documentary by Orson Welles, Around the World with Orson Welles: St.-Germain-des-Prés.

At the age of 73, Duncan proposed creating the city of "New Paris York" at latitude 45N, longitude 36W (in the middle of the Atlantic Ocean) as a symbol of cooperation and inter-cultural communication.

== Personal life ==
In 1903, Duncan married Penelope Sikelianos (c. 1883–1917) the sister of Greek poet Angelos Sikelianos. Together Duncan and Sikelianos had one child, Menalkas Duncan (1905–1969).

Duncan later married Aia Bertrand (1891–1978), a Latvian dancer and writer, with whom he had one daughter.

Duncan died on August 14, 1966, in Cavalaire-sur-Mer, France. Duncan was cremated at Père Lachaise Cemetery and his ashes were repatriated to New York City.

== See also ==
- American philosophy
- List of American philosophers
