= Arnold Gamson =

American conductor

Arnold U. Gamson (December 30, 1926 – January 17, 2018) was an American conductor who was particularly known for his work within the field of opera. He notably co-founded and served as the music director and principal conductor of the American Opera Society from 1950–1960. His work with the AOS was highly influential in sparking and perpetuating the post-World War II bel canto revival, particularly through a number of highly lauded productions of rarely heard works by Gioachino Rossini and Vincenzo Bellini. He was the husband of renowned dancer and choreographer Annabelle Gamson. Their daughter, Rosanna Gamson, is also a celebrated choreographer and their son, David Gamson is a composer of platinum-selling popular songs.

== Biography ==
Raised in Port Chester, New York, Gamson studied at the Juilliard School( M.S 1953) and while there founded the American Opera Society (AOS) with Allen Sven Oxenburg in 1950. The company was initially envisioned as an organization to perform Renaissance music and baroque operas in the space for which those works for written, in the homes of the rich. The company's first production was Claudio Monteverdi's Il Combattimento di Tancredi e Clorinda for an audience of 50 in the drawing room of a mansion on 5th Avenue in New York City. These smaller concerts quickly became so popular that the AOS had to move to increasingly larger venues, ultimately using Carnegie Hall as the company's home. Gamson conducted the company's performances during the 1950s; concerts which mostly featured rarely heard operas from a variety of musical eras. Many of these operas had never been heard in the United States before and featured great vocalists of the period, including Leontyne Price, Jon Vickers and Elisabeth Schwarzkopf and others early in their careers.

While working for the AOS, Gamson appeared as a guest conductor with opera companies and orchestras including the Montreal Philharmonic and Teatro de Bellas Artes in Mexico. He notably conducted Eileen Farrell in her opera debut in the title role of Luigi Cherubini's Médée. The work was performed in concert and later recorded for Columbia Records. He conducted Farrell in her first fully staged opera role singing the role of Santuzza in Pietro Mascagni's Cavalleria Rusticana in Tampa, Florida in 1956. During the late 1950s and early 1960s Gamson was an assistant conductor under Leonard Bernstein with the New York City Opera (NYCO). He made his conducting debut at the NYCO with the first professional production of Mark Bucci's Tale for a Deaf Ear on April 6, 1958.

On November 21, 1958, Gamson married dancer Annabelle Gamson. The couple went on to have two children: Rosanna and David. In March 1960 Gamson was an assistant conductor with the New York Philharmonic at Carnegie Hall at the invitation of Leonard Bernstein, leading the orchestra in performances of Henry Brant's Antiphony One. He also led the NYP in selections from Rossini's L'Italiana in Algeri during one of the orchestra's Young People's Concerts in April 1960.

In 1961 Gamson left the AOS and moved with his wife to Europe, working actively as an opera conductor in theaters in Italy for two of years. During this time he returned to the US to conduct a 1961 television broadcast of Mozart's Der Schauspieldirektor with Eleanor Steber as Madame Warblewell, Jacquelynne Moody as Madame Heartmelt, and John Kuhn in the title role. He also conducted the Voice of Firestone presentation of Verdi's La Traviata on television. The Gamsons moved back to the United States in the mid-1960s, settling in Westchester County, New York. Gamson worked as a conductor with the AOS again in 1967, notably conducting Handel's Giulio Cesare with Montserrat Caballé as Cleopatra.

In the early 1970s Gamson's position as a prominent opera conductor began to fade. Although he remained active as a conductor he worked mostly with second tier opera companies up through the 1990s. In addition, Gamson has worked as a conductor for dance, often in conjunction with his wife's career. He lived in retirement in New York state before his death on January 17, 2018.
