= Isadorables =

Dancing group

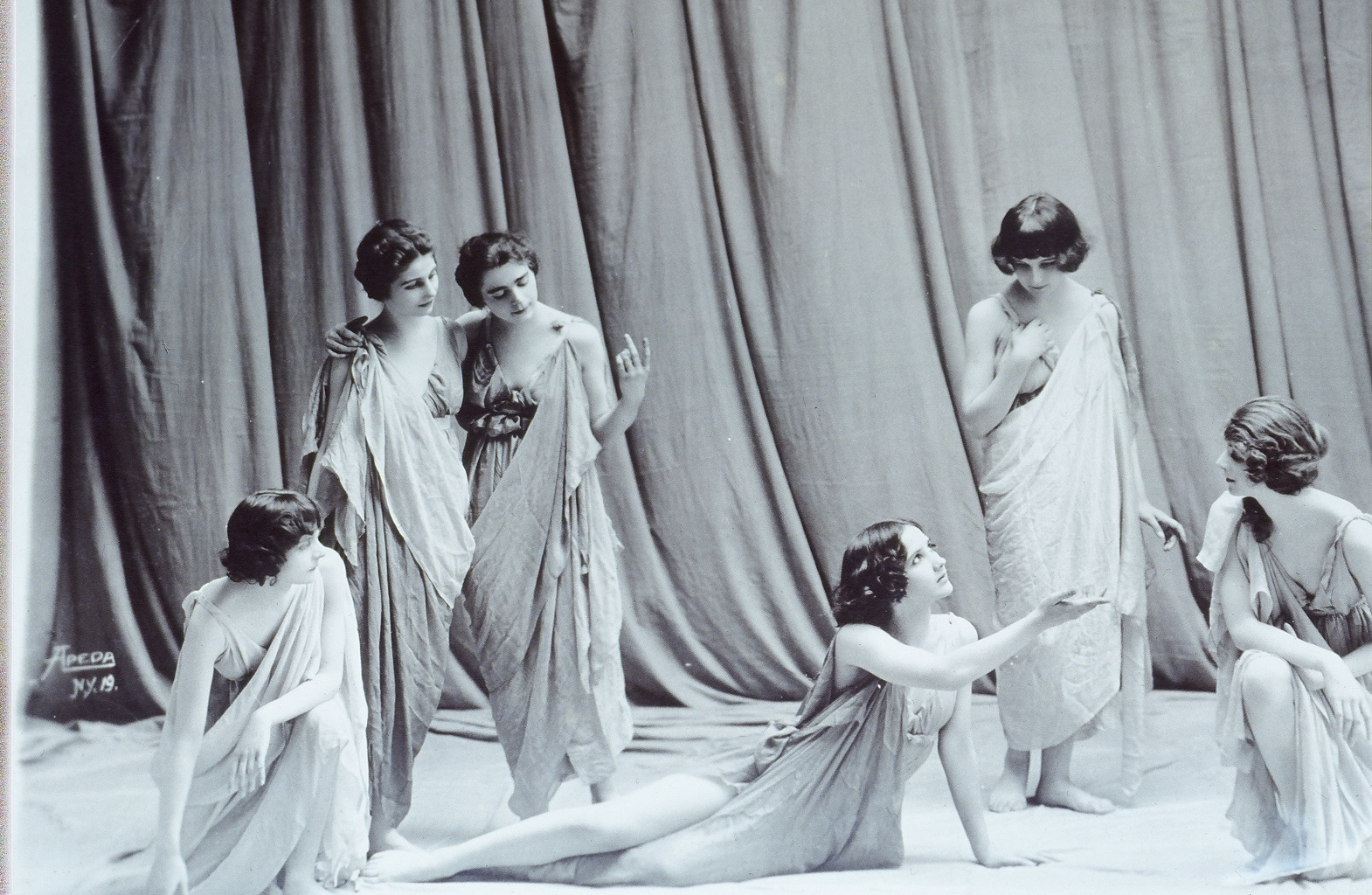
The six Isadora Duncan Dancers in 1919

The Isadorables, also known as the Isadora Duncan Dancers, were a group of six young girls, Anna Denzler, Maria-Theresa Kruger, Irma Erich-Grimme, Elizabeth Milker, Margot Jehl, and Erica Lohmann, who danced under the instruction of Isadora Duncan. Their "Isadorables" nickname was given to them by the French poet Fernand Divoire in 1909. They later used the Duncan last name to identify with Duncan dance. Irma falsely claimed, "This was done legally through the New York courts," even though no adoption ever took place.

The girls, mostly German, danced in modern style (they were known as "Barefoot" and "Aesthetic Dancers") between 1905 and 1920. They emerged from Duncan's established schools, then had careers with Duncan herself. Later, they separated from their mentor to dance as their own group before they disbanded in 1921.

== First school ==
Originally, the group was made up of individual children taken in by Duncan, and they were taught first at the Isadora Duncan School of Dance located in Grunewald, Germany. Duncan believed that her teaching and education should start at the child level. "Let us first teach little children to breathe, to vibrate, to feel, and to become one with the general harmony and movement. Let us first produce a beautiful human being."

She took in young children, most of whom, reflecting Duncan's personal history, came from disadvantaged backgrounds, where mothers were the primary breadwinners, and the fathers were either ill or absent. Thus students were chosen based on financial need rather than their natural dance talent. The school provided rooms for the students, so the students could be with Duncan at all times. The School existed three years, but never housed more than 20 students. The school had a rigorous schedule, with dance being only one of the subjects taught, and then only twice a week. The other subjects were history, literature, mathematics, natural science, drawing, singing, languages, and music.

"Isadora was away on tour most of the time, dancing to support her dependents" so dance was taught by her sister, Elizabeth Duncan, who seemed to be the very opposite in nature to Isadora's free spirited and light personality; she was very organized and strict. So at sporadic returns of Isadora the children rejoiced. Later Isadora admitted in regards to her first school that she did not know how to identify dance talent nor was she even concerned with dance talent because the purpose of the first school was not to create stage dancers.

== Naming of the Isadorables ==
The story of the Isadorables begins with the six most talented girls chosen from this school. These were the ones closest to Duncan and who had the most opportunity to spend time with and dance with her. The girls' first fundraising demonstration was on July 20, 1905, and they continued to support the school with over 70 fundraising demonstrations between 1905 and 1909 in Germany, the Netherlands, Switzerland, Russia, Finland, England, and France. These six were Anna Denzler, Maria-Theresa Krüger, Irma Erich-Grimme, Elizabeth (Lisa) Milker, Margot (Gretel) Jehl, and Erica (Erika) Lohmann. In 1909, a French poet, Fernand Divoire, adoringly dubbed the six girls "the Isadorables" after seeing them dance.

== Relocation to New York City and reactions ==
In 1912, Isadora acquires the Hôtel Paillard in the Bellevue section of Paris. This became Dionysion, Isadora's new temple of dance; the name stemming from Dionysian, which hints toward Isadora's Greek undertones in her dances. At the start of World War I, the Isadorables were sent to New York with the rest of the new students from Bellevue. In November 1914, they took up a studio at 311 Fourth Avenue, on the corner of 23rd street, the new location of Dionysion. Their arrival was met by criticism from the press and public that already regarded "classic" dancing as a relic of the past.

The Isadorables made their American debut on December 7, 1914, at Carnegie Hall with the New York Symphony. Henrietta Rodman in a feature for the New York Tribune as much as stated that the most revolutionary of dancers [Isadora Duncan] had lost touch with the times. She was also struck by the Isadorables' unthinking devotion to their teacher's ideals. "The one weakness of their education was their lack of contact with the harsh and ugly realities of our present day life. It is Isadora's theory that children should move always in a world of "sweetness and light."

Mabel Dodge, who owned a salon at 23 Fifth Avenue, the point of rendezvous for the whole of New York's avant garde of the time, described the girls: "They were lovely, with bodies like cream and rose, and faces unreal with beauty whose eyes were like blind statues, as though they had never looked upon anything in any way sordid or ordinary".

== Switzerland ==
Following eviction from the Century by the New York City Fire Department on April 23, 1915, (their season at the Century lasted a month) Isadora left America to return to Europe on May 9. During the voyage Isadora discovered that their manager, Frederick Toye, had arranged for a tour for the Isadorables without her. She was so upset that she stopped speaking to her students, despite the man's actions being completely out of their control. The girls, then, would not travel with her to Greece at the expense of their safety during the time of war: They moved to set up school in Switzerland instead. After struggling to keep afloat there, the school was dispelled and the younger students sent home to their families. But the Isadorables embarked on a dancing tour of the country.

== Duncan last name, and separating from Isadora ==
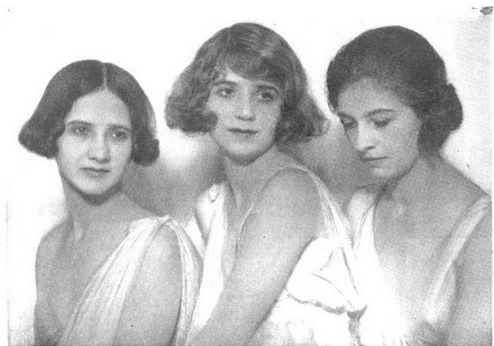
Anna, Lisa, and Margot, from a 1922 advertisement.

In 1917, the girls attempted to legally change their surname to Duncan. However, on May 16, 1920 The New York Times reported that the Isadorables had failed in their petition to become Duncans by law. The New York court rejected the girls’ petition because neither Isadora nor any of her family members ever authorized in writing their consent for any of them to use the Duncan surname, for professional purposes. Nevertheless, three of them (Irma, Anna and Lisa) would use the Duncan surname for the rest of their lives. In 1917, they found themselves in Long Island and five of them fell in love, starting a rift among them and their famed teacher. Each girl, except for Gretel, did not wish to leave New York despite Isadora's incessant urging. Aided by Isadora's brother, Augustin Duncan, they performed as a group at the Liberty Theatre. "It was [our] success as a group" Theresa wrote, "without Isadora for the first time...that gave us the opportunity to find our own strength as soloists and individual artists." The girls performed until Isadora found out and forbade them from continuing, and legal contract prevented them from separating from her. They had no choice but to cancel their time at the Liberty.

In 1920, after returning to France, the girls finally realized that their contracts no longer held substance, so they threw them away. The girls arrived in Greece in August 1920 with Isadora, and by the end of September, they had all fallen ill. In January 1921, only four of the Isadorables joined Isadora in France at the Champs-Élysées. Irma, Theresa, Lisa, and Margot were left doing nothing in Paris because Isadora refused to have them perform and only let them if they gave her a third of their fees. It wasn't until the U.S. Copyright Act of 1976 that choreographers could protect their art, with similar laws passed internationally. Upon Isadora's return, in May 1921, she brought news of starting a school in Russia, but only Irma was willing to accompany her. While Isadora toured and performed, Irma took the assistant teaching position at the school.

== The girls ==
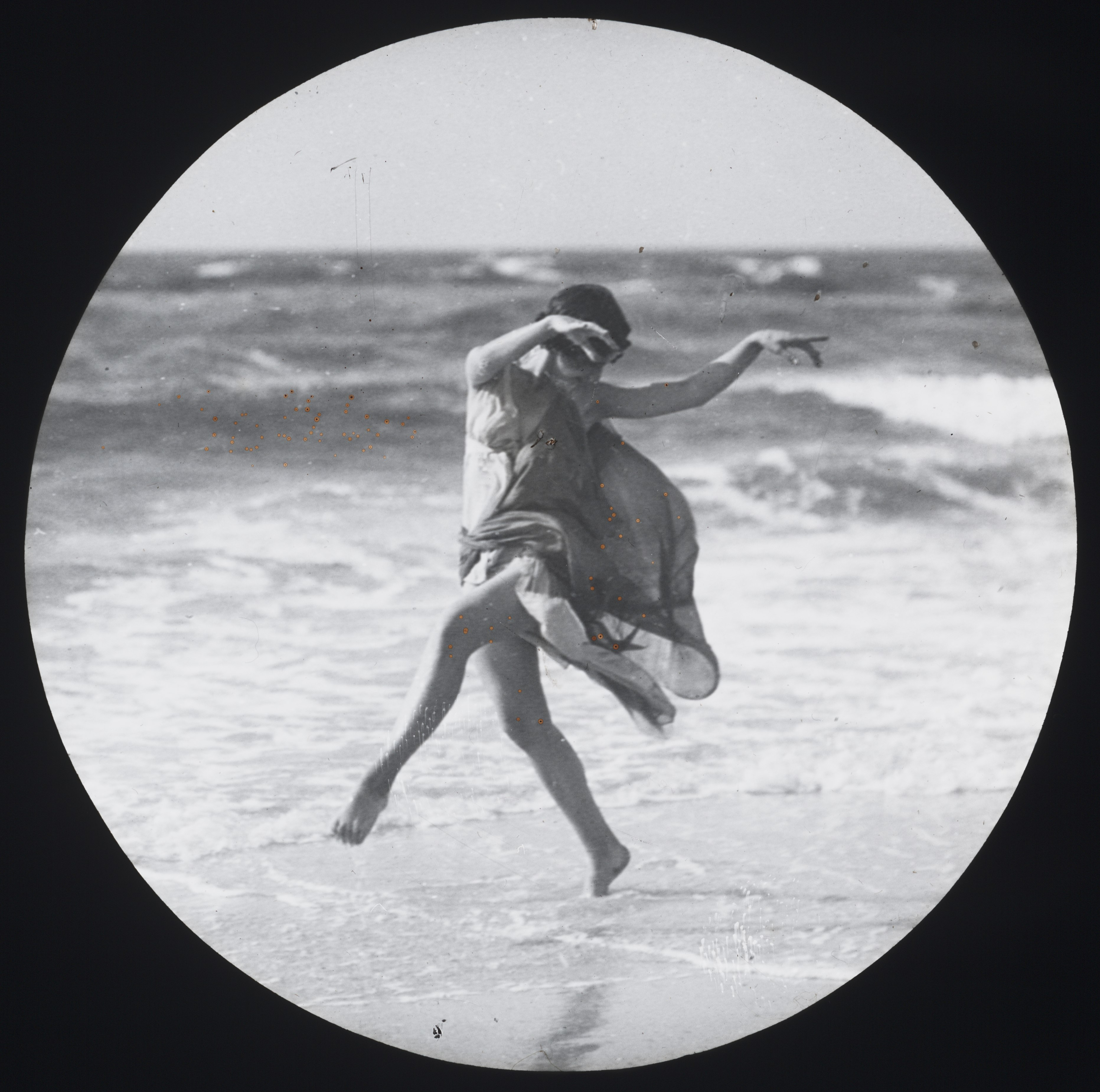
Anna c. 1920

The New York Sun in May 1915 described the girls individually: "The little girls of the early blue-and-white stage have grown up into miniature Isadora Duncans… They are known only by their Christian names. Anna, the eldest, is actively concerned with the affairs of the worlds around her. Theresa and Irma come next, an impulsive and spirited pair. Liesel [Lisa] is long-haired and long-legged, physically the best dancer of any of them.... Gretel is a thoughtful child, filled with a sense of her dignity and somewhat mystified with the American manner of doing things. Erica, being the youngest, is also the most serious. She has recently had her hair bobbed, but not quite so short as Isadora Duncan's. One must be conservative in such matters"

Anna Denzler (born 1894 in Switzerland, died 1980 in New York) – "pretty and dark-haired with round rosy cheeks and small chocolate-brown eyes". She described dancing in the group: "Six girls to have been the chosen ones, to have stood on the same stage with Her, performing Her dances and bringing joy and solace to so many… to have had the wonderful and privileged experience of a life and great adventure with Her… this wonderful woman and creative artist… our Maestra".

Maria-Theresa Kruger (born 1895 in Dresden, died 1987 in New York) – "blue eyes, blond hair, and a lot of freckles on her tiny nose".

Irma Erich-Grimme (born 1897 in Hamburg, died 1977 in California)

Elizabeth (Lisa) Milker (born 1898 in Dresden, died 1976) – "with pretty golden curls and the large brown eyes of a startled deer".

Margot (Gretel) Jehl (born 1900 in Berlin, died 1925 in Paris) – "with violet eyes, ash-blond hair and the delicate look of a Dresden China-Doll".

Erica (Erika) Lohmann (born 1901 in Hamburg, died 1984 in Connecticut) – "dark-eyed Erika, who at four years of age was the youngest in the school".

== After separating from Isadora ==
After leaving Duncan, the girls stayed together for some time. During World War I, they entertained troops in the US: In 1919, they toured 60 cities under Sol Hurok's management.

Maria-Theresa was the first to become an independent soloist in 1922, with four New York City concerts. By then, she had married Stephan Bourgeois, an art dealer, and founded her own company, the Heliconiades. Anna was on the faculty at the Eastman School of Music and subsequently taught at Carnegie Hall, beginning in 1926. Irma arrived in 1928 with the Moscow pupils on a Hurok-sponsored tour and, after their return to Russia, toured with Americans trained by Anna.

Louis Jouvet, the famed French actor and director, was Lisa's companion and acted as her lighting designer. Anna was involved with Walter Rummel, the musician who had been Isadora's admirer. In New York, she taught and acted in films. Irma later married an American, Sherman Rogers, and taught and performed with her dancers. Erica (Erika, the only Isadorable not to continue a dancing career), became a painter, according to sometime director of Isadora Duncan International Institute Ms. Bardsley.

On September 13, 1988, the active disciples of the Isadorables, who together formed the Duncan Council, scheduled an event to honor Maria-Theresa Duncan, who had died the year before. The event was conceived by one of Theresa's own pupils, who directed the Isadora Duncan International Institute.
