= Amilcar CGSS =

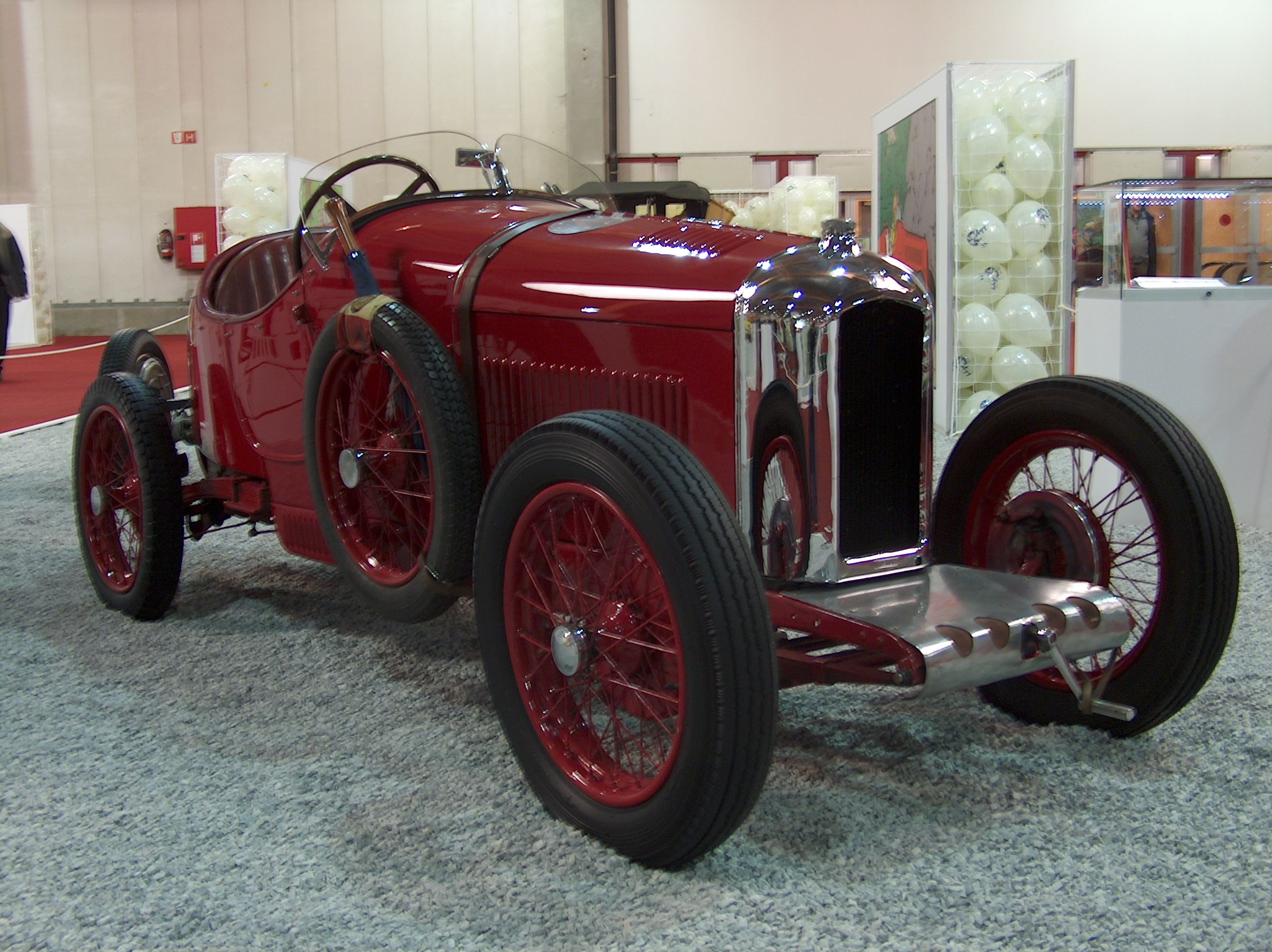
- Amilcar CGSS 2-Seater Sports 1927

Overview
- Manufacturer: Amilcar
- Production: 1926–1929

Body and chassis
- Related: Amilcar CGS

Powertrain
- Engine: 1,074 cc I4
- Transmission: Three speed manual

Dimensions
- Wheelbase: 91.5 in (2,320 mm)
- Length: 134 in (3,400 mm)

The Amilcar CGSS (or CGSs) was a sporting car made by the Amilcar company from 1926 to 1929. The second S stood for surbaisse (lower) and the car was a lowered version of the CGS.

Isadora Duncan, the American dancer, died in a CGSS when her silk scarf became entangled in the open-spoked wheels.

== Description ==
The 1,074 cc four-cylinder engine from the CGS was fitted, but in a slightly higher state of tune, delivering 35 hp (26 kW). It was also available with a Cozette supercharger for those who needed more power. Thus equipped, a CGSS won the 1927 Monte Carlo Rally. Driven by Lefebvre, it started from Königsberg (today's Kaliningrad).

4,700 of the CGS and CGSS were made.

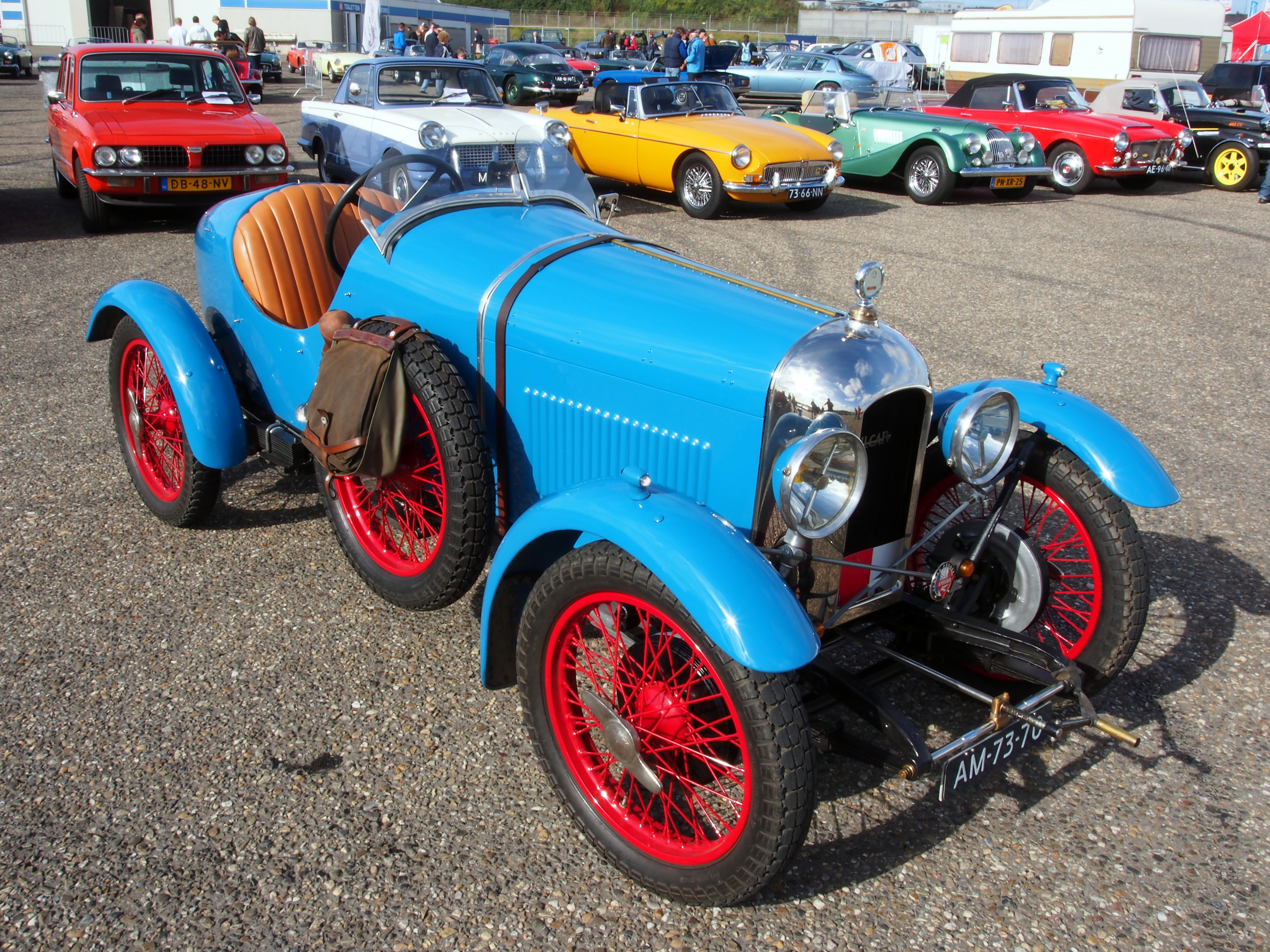
1927 Amilcar CGSS 2-Seater Sports

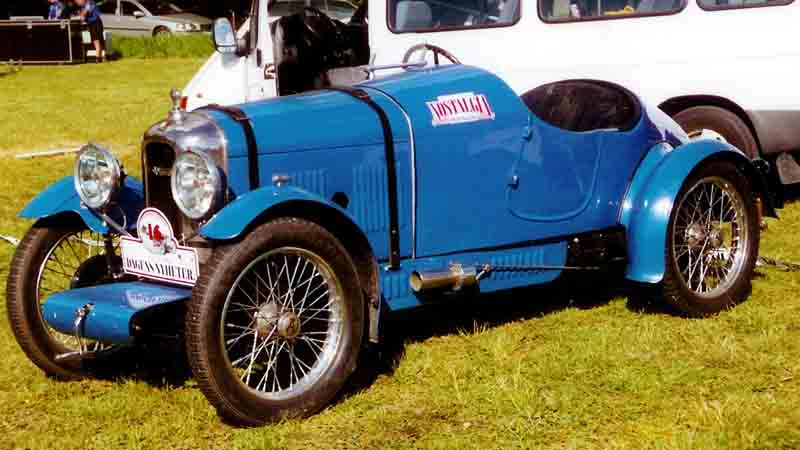
Amilcar CGSS 2-Seater Sports 1927

== Isadora Duncan ==
Isadora Duncan's fondness for flowing scarves was the cause of her death in 1927 in an automobile accident in Nice, France. The famed American dancer was the passenger in an Amilcar CGSS when her silk scarf became entangled in the open-spoked wheels and rear axle, pulling her from the car and breaking her neck.
