= Augustin Duncan =

American actor

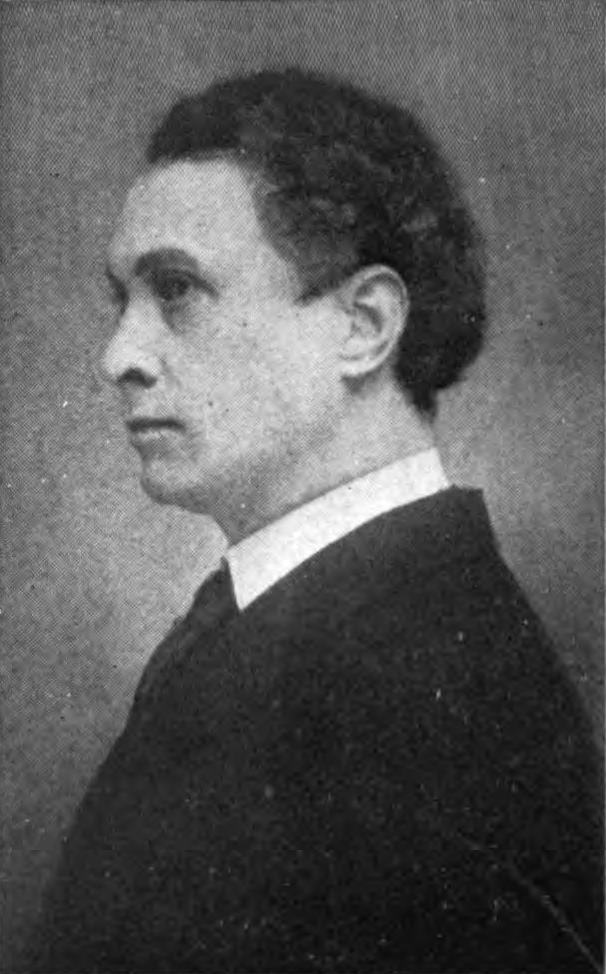
Augustin Duncan

Augustin Duncan (April 17, 1873 – 1954) was an American actor and director active in New York and London during the first half of the 20th century.

== Biography ==
The eldest boy of four children of Joseph Charles Duncan, a banker, and Mary Isadora Gray, he was the brother of Isadora Duncan, Raymond Duncan and Elizabeth Duncan.

Duncan made his stage debut in 1893 in San Francisco, and toured for seven years before appearing in New York in 1900, then continuing in roles in New York and London.

In 1919, he was a member of the Theatre Guild as a performer and director. After he separated from the Guild, Duncan directed and acted in such productions as The Cradle Song (1921), The Detour (1921), The First Man (1922), Hell-Bent for Heaven (1924), and Juno and the Paycock (1926). He also directed plays in which he did not appear, such as Kempy (1922).

In the late 1920s his eyesight started to fail. By the early 1930s Duncan was blind. He continued to perform, playing John of Gaunt and the Ghost in Maurice Evans's productions of Richard II (1937) and Hamlet (1938). He made his last appearance as the Father in Lute Song in 1946.

He married the Broadway actress Margherita Sargent. Their son Angus was Executive Director of Actors' Equity Association from 1952 – 1972.

== Sources ==
- Augustin Duncan, an entry in: The Oxford Companion to American Theatre, by Gerald Bordman and Thomas H. Hischak, Oxford University Press, 2004. ISBN 978-0-19-516986-7
