= American Opera Society =

Former musical organization in New York City

- Formation: 1951
- Dissolved: 1970
- Type: Opera company
- Location: New York City

The American Opera Society (AOS) was a New York City-based musical organization that presented concert and semi-staged performances of operas between 1951 and 1970. The company was highly influential in sparking and perpetuating the post World War II bel canto revival, particularly through a number of highly lauded productions of rarely heard works by Gioachino Rossini, Gaetano Donizetti, and Vincenzo Bellini. The AOS also presented many operas to the American public for the first time, including the United States premieres of Benjamin Britten's Billy Budd, Giuseppe Verdi's Giovanna d'Arco, George Frideric Handel's Hercules and Hector Berlioz's Les troyens to name just a few.

== History ==
The American Opera Society was founded in 1950 by two young musicians at the Juilliard School: Allen Sven Oxenburg and Arnold Gamson. Oxenburg served as the AOS's Artistic Director throughout the company's entire history. Gamson served as the AOS's Music Director and principal conductor between 1951–1960 and later returned to conduct several performances with the AOS in the late 1960s; including a lauded production of Handel's Giulio Cesare with Montserrat Caballé as Cleopatra in 1967. Composer Samuel Barlow notably served as the President of the board during much of the 1950s.

The AOS was initially envisioned as an organization to perform Renaissance music and baroque operas in the space for which those works were written, in the homes of the rich. The company's first production was Claudio Monteverdi's L'incoronazione di Poppea for an audience of 50 in the drawing room of a mansion on 5th Avenue in New York City in 1951. These smaller concerts quickly became so popular that the AOS had to move to increasingly larger venues, ultimately using Carnegie Hall as the company's home. Gamson conducted almost all of the company's performances during the 1950s; concerts which mostly featured rarely heard operas from a variety of musical eras. Many of these operas, such as Christoph Willibald Gluck's Le cadi dupé, had never been heard in the United States before.

Oxenburg's eye for talent provided many notable singers with their first opportunity to perform on the New York stage. Singers who make their New York debut with AOS included Teresa Berganza, Montserrat Caballé, Eileen Farrell, Dietrich Fischer-Dieskau, Maureen Forrester, Marilyn Horne, Leontyne Price, Elisabeth Schwarzkopf, Joan Sutherland, Carol Toscano, and Jon Vickers among others. Oxenburg also presented a lauded production of Bellini's Il pirata with Maria Callas as Imogene in 1959. He had had the presence of mind to approach Callas with a contract after her contract with the Metropolitan Opera had been canceled earlier that year. During the AOS's final season, Beverly Sills sang the first New York production of Donizetti's La Fille du Regiment in 27 years in February 1970.

In 1970 Oxenburg was forced to disband the AOS due to financial reasons.
