= Isadora Duncan =

American dancer and choreographer (1877–1927)

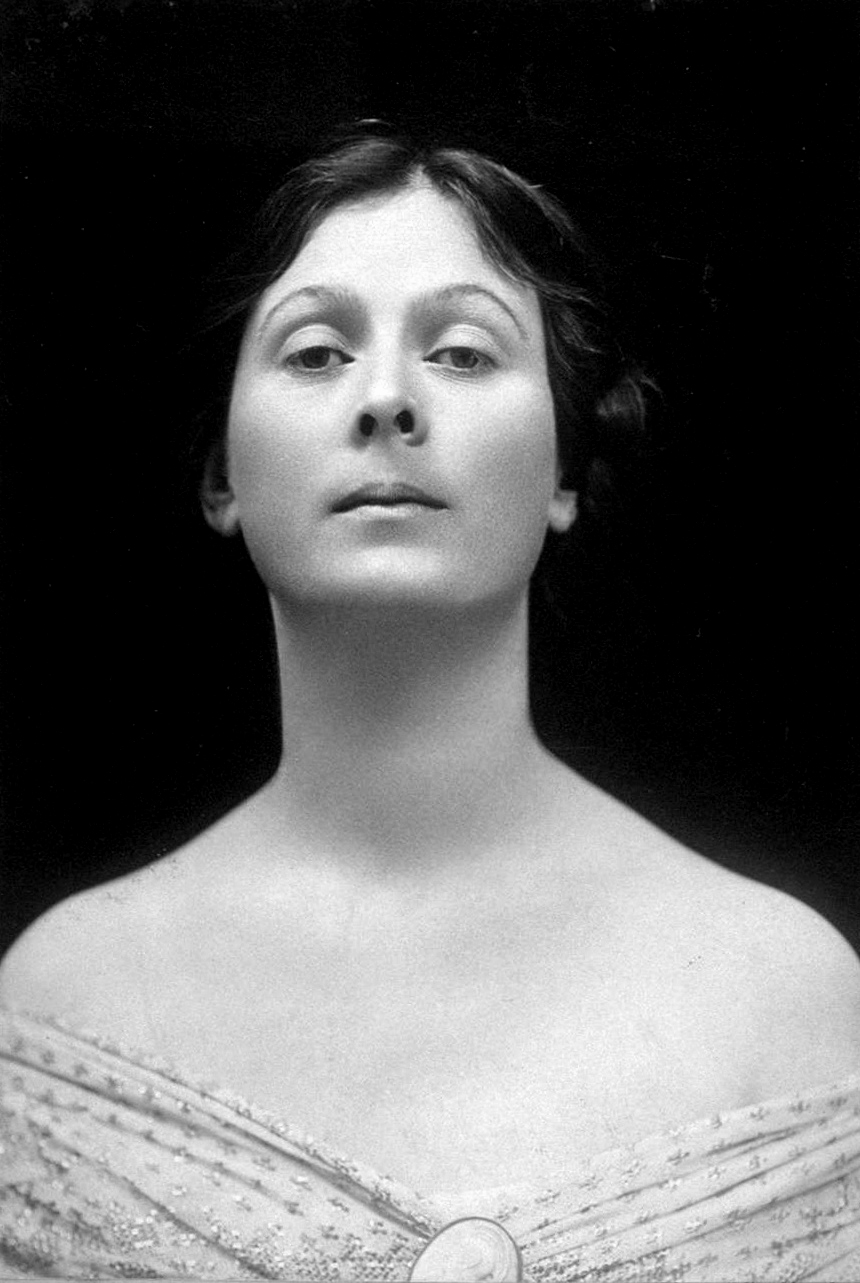
- Duncan c. 1906–1912
- Born: Angela Isadora Duncan; May 26, 1877 (Note: While Duncan's birth date is widely given as May 27, 1878, her posthumously discovered baptismal certificate records May 26, 1877. Any corroborating documents that might have existed were likely destroyed in the 1906 San Francisco earthquake.); San Francisco, California, U.S.
- Died: September 14, 1927 (aged 50); Nice, France
- Citizenship: American, French, Soviet
- Known for: Dance and choreography
- Movement: Modern/contemporary dance
- Spouse: Sergei Yesenin (m. 1922; sep. 1923)
- Partner(s): Edward Gordon Craig; Paris Singer; Romano Romanelli; Mercedes de Acosta
- Children: 3
- Relatives: Augustin Duncan (brother); Raymond Duncan (brother); Elizabeth Duncan (sister)

Signature
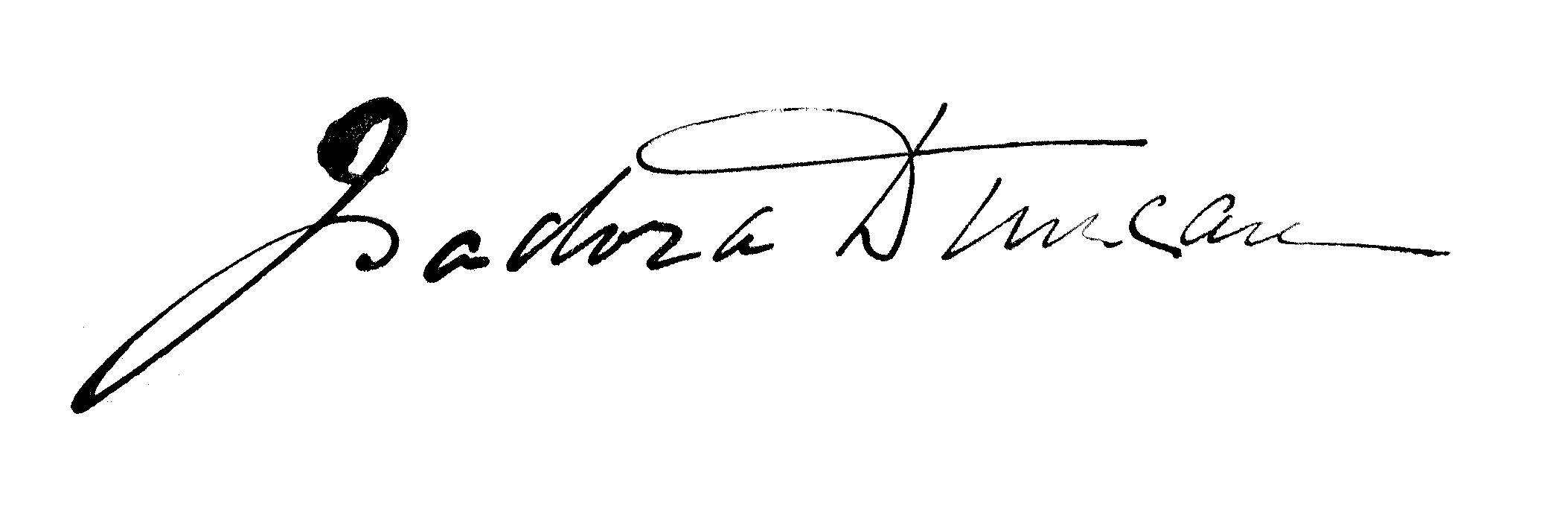

Angela Isadora Duncan (May 26, 1877, or May 27, 1878 – September 14, 1927) was an American-born dancer and choreographer, who was a pioneer of modern contemporary dance and performed to great acclaim throughout Europe and the United States. Born and raised in California, she lived and danced in Western Europe, the U.S., and Soviet Russia from the age of 22. She died when her scarf became entangled in the wheel and axle of the car in which she was travelling in Nice, France.

== Early life ==
Angela Isadora Duncan was born in San Francisco, the youngest of the four children of Joseph Charles Duncan (1819–1898), a banker, mining engineer and connoisseur of the arts, and Mary Isadora Gray (1849–1922). Her brothers were Augustin Duncan and Raymond Duncan; her sister, Elizabeth Duncan, was also a dancer. Soon after Isadora's birth, her father was investigated and charged following the collapse of the family’s bank, which coincided with a larger reorganization of San Francisco’s finances, a period of crushing reversals and closing of silver mines. Although the jury voted for his acquittal, Isadora's mother (angered over his infidelities as well as the financial scandal) divorced him, and from then on the family struggled with poverty. Joseph Duncan, along with his third wife and their daughter, died in 1898 when the British passenger steamer SS Mohegan ran aground off the coast of Cornwall.

After her parents' divorce, Isadora's mother moved with her family to Oakland, California, where she worked as a seamstress and piano teacher. Isadora attended school from the ages of six to ten, but she dropped out, having found it constricting. She and her three siblings earned money by teaching dance to local children.

In 1896, Duncan became part of Augustin Daly's theater company in New York, but she soon became disillusioned with the form and craved a different environment with less of a hierarchy.

== Work ==
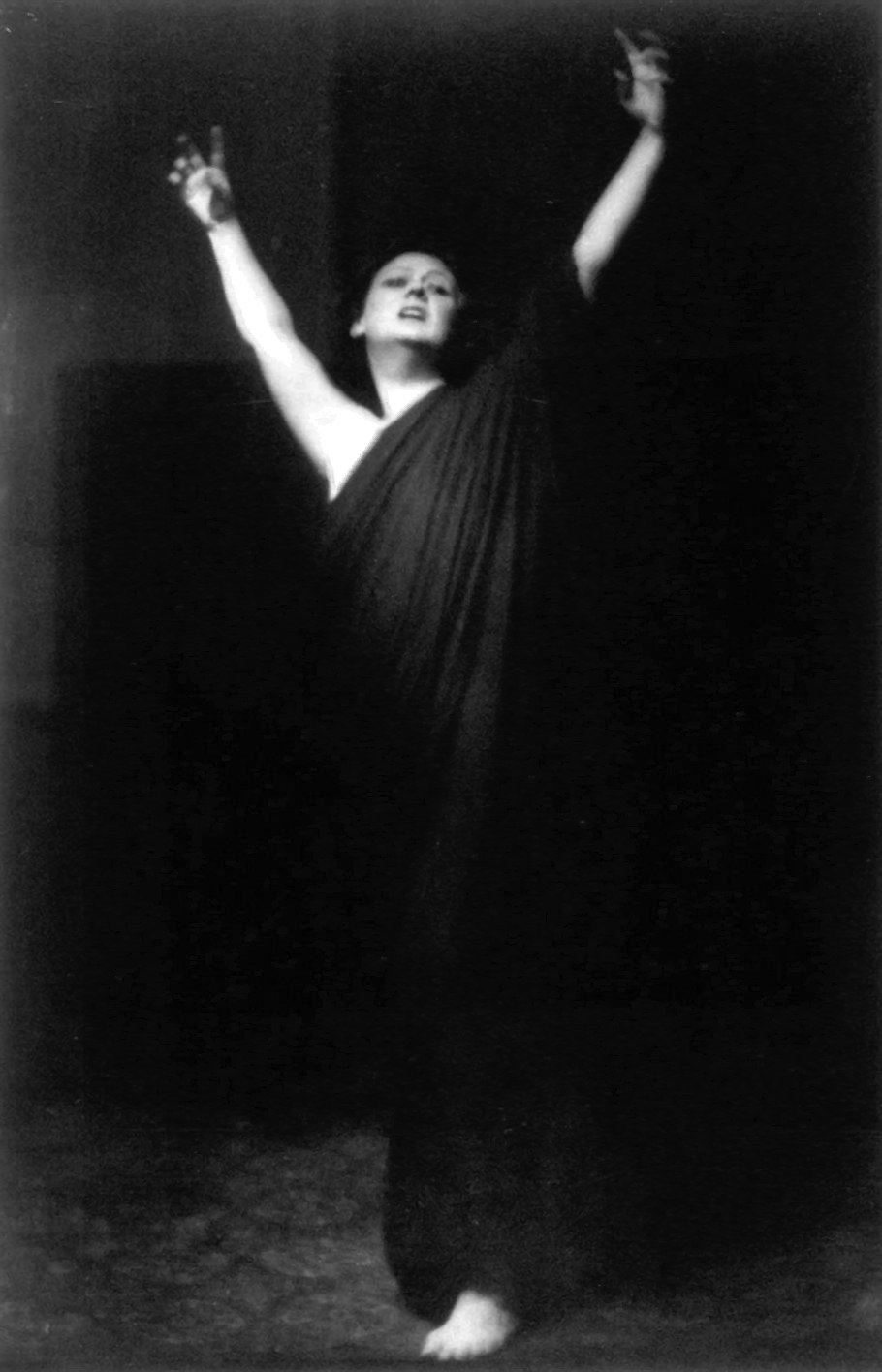
Photo by Arnold Genthe of Duncan performing barefoot during her 1915–1918 American tour

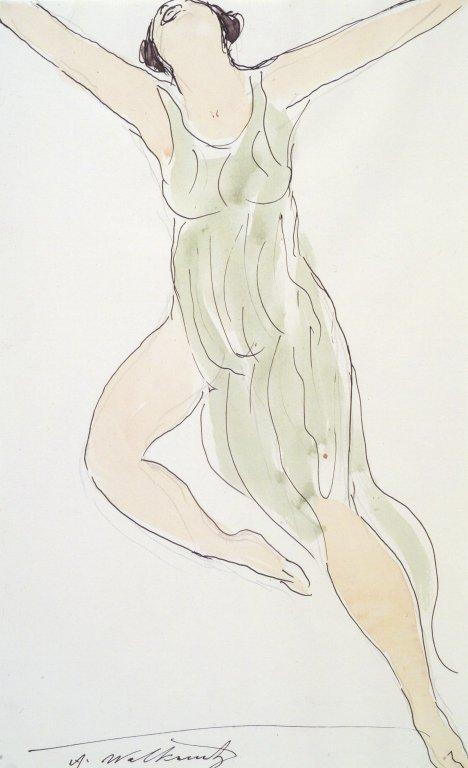
Abraham Walkowitz's Isadora Duncan #29, one of many works of art she inspired

Duncan's novel approach to dance had been evident since the classes she had taught as a teenager, where she "followed [her] fantasy and improvised, teaching any pretty thing that came into [her] head". A desire to travel brought her to Chicago, where she auditioned for many theater companies, finally finding a place in Augustin Daly's company. This took her to New York City where her unique vision of dance clashed with the popular pantomimes of theater companies. While in New York, Duncan also took some classes with Marie Bonfanti but was quickly disappointed by ballet routine.

Feeling unhappy and unappreciated in America, Duncan moved to London in 1898. She performed in the drawing rooms of the wealthy, taking inspiration from the Greek vases and bas-reliefs in the British Museum. The earnings from these engagements enabled her to rent a studio, allowing her to develop her work and create larger performances for the stage. From London, she traveled to Paris, where she was inspired by the Louvre and the Exposition Universelle of 1900 and danced in the salons of Marguerite de Saint-Marceaux and Princesse Edmond de Polignac. In France, as elsewhere, Duncan delighted her audience.

In 1902, Loie Fuller invited Duncan to tour with her. This took Duncan all over Europe as she created new works using her innovative technique, which emphasized natural movement in contrast to the rigidity of traditional ballet. She spent most of the rest of her life touring Europe and the Americas in this fashion. Despite mixed reaction from critics, Duncan became quite popular for her distinctive style and inspired many visual artists, such as Antoine Bourdelle, Dame Laura Knight, Auguste Rodin, Arnold Rönnebeck, André Dunoyer de Segonzac, and Abraham Walkowitz, to create works based on her.

In 1910, Duncan met the occultist Aleister Crowley at a party, an episode recounted by Crowley in his Confessions. (Note: Abridged ed, p. 676.) He refers to Duncan as "Lavinia King", and used the same invented name for her in his 1929 novel Moonchild (written in 1917). Crowley wrote of Duncan that she "has this gift of gesture in a very high degree. Let the reader study her dancing, if possible in private than in public, and learn the superb 'unconsciousness' – which is magical consciousness – with which she suits the action to the melody." Crowley was, in fact, more attracted to Duncan's bohemian companion Mary Dempsey (a.k.a. Mary D'Este or Desti), with whom he had an affair. Desti had come to Paris in 1901 where she soon met Duncan, and the two became inseparable. Desti, who also appeared in Moonchild (as "Lisa la Giuffria") and became a member of Crowley's occult order, (Note: Desti helped Crowley write his magnum opus Magick (Book 4) under her magical name of "Soror Virakam", and also co-edited four numbers of his journal The Equinox, and contributed several collaborative plays.) later wrote a memoir of her experiences with Duncan. (Note: The Untold Story: The Life of Isadora Duncan 1921–1927 (1929).)

In 1911, the French fashion designer Paul Poiret rented a mansion – Pavillon du Butard in La Celle-Saint-Cloud – and threw lavish parties, including one of the more famous grandes fêtes, La fête de Bacchus on June 20, 1912, re-creating the Bacchanalia hosted by Louis XIV at Versailles. Isadora Duncan, wearing a Greek evening gown designed by Poiret, danced on tables among 300 guests; 900 bottles of champagne were consumed until the first light of day.

=== Opening schools of dance ===
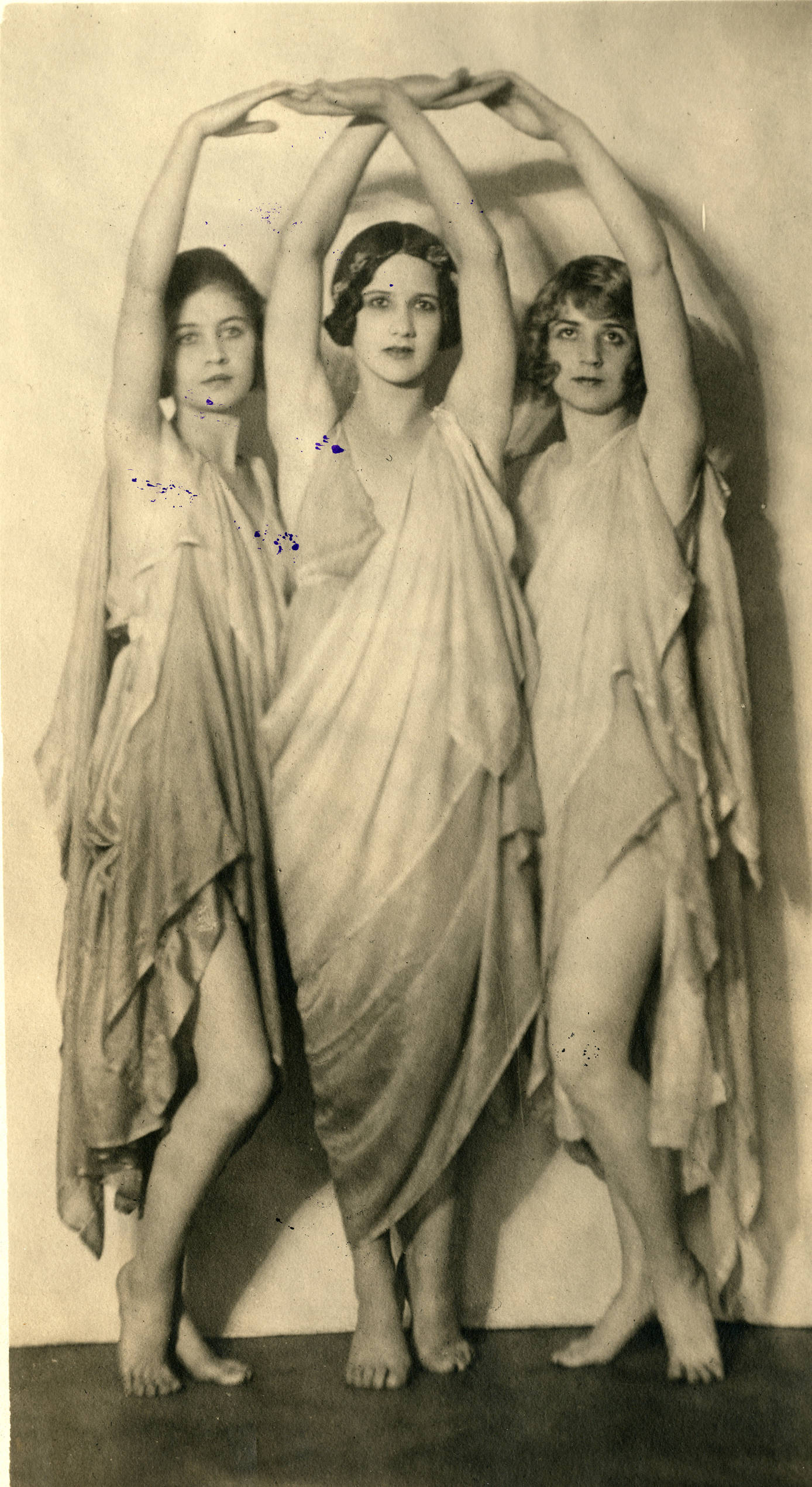
Anna, Lisa and Margot, "Isadorables"

Duncan disliked the commercial aspects of public performance, such as touring and contracts, because she felt they distracted her from her real mission, namely the creation of beauty and the education of the young. To achieve her mission, she opened schools to teach young girls her philosophy of dance. The first was established in 1904 in Grunewald, Berlin, Germany. This institution was in existence for three years and was the birthplace of the "Isadorables" (Anna, Maria-Theresa, Irma, (Gretel), Lisa, and Erika), Duncan optimistically dreamed her school would train “thousands of young dancing maidens” in non-professional community dance. It was a boarding school that in addition to a regular education, also taught dance but the students were not expected or even encouraged to be professional dancers. Duncan did not legally adopt all six girls as is commonly believed. Nevertheless, three of them (Irma, Anna and Lisa) would use the Duncan surname for the rest of their lives. After about a decade in Berlin, Duncan established a school in Paris that soon closed because of the outbreak of World War I.

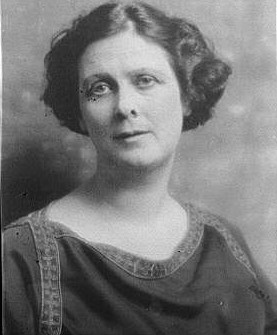
Duncan c. 1916–1918

In 1914, Duncan moved to the United States and transferred her school there. A townhouse on Gramercy Park in New York was provided for its use, and its studio was nearby, on the northeast corner of 23rd Street and Fourth Avenue (now Park Avenue South). Otto Kahn, the head of Kuhn, Loeb & Co., gave Duncan use of the very modern Century Theatre at West 60th Street and Central Park West for her performances and productions, which included a staging of Oedipus Rex that involved almost all of Duncan's extended entourage and friends. During her time in New York, Duncan posed for studies by the photographer Arnold Genthe.

Duncan had planned to leave the United States in 1915 aboard the RMS Lusitania on its ill-fated voyage, but historians believe her financial situation at the time drove her to choose a more modest crossing. In 1921, Duncan's leftist sympathies took her to the Soviet Union, where she founded a school in Moscow. However, the Soviet government's failure to follow through on promises to support her work caused her to return in 1924 to the West and leave the school to her protégée and adopted daughter, German-born Irma Doretta Henrietta Erih-Grimm Duncan (1897—1977). In 1924, Duncan composed a dance routine called Varshavianka to the tune of the Polish revolutionary song known in English as Whirlwinds of Danger.

== Philosophy and technique ==
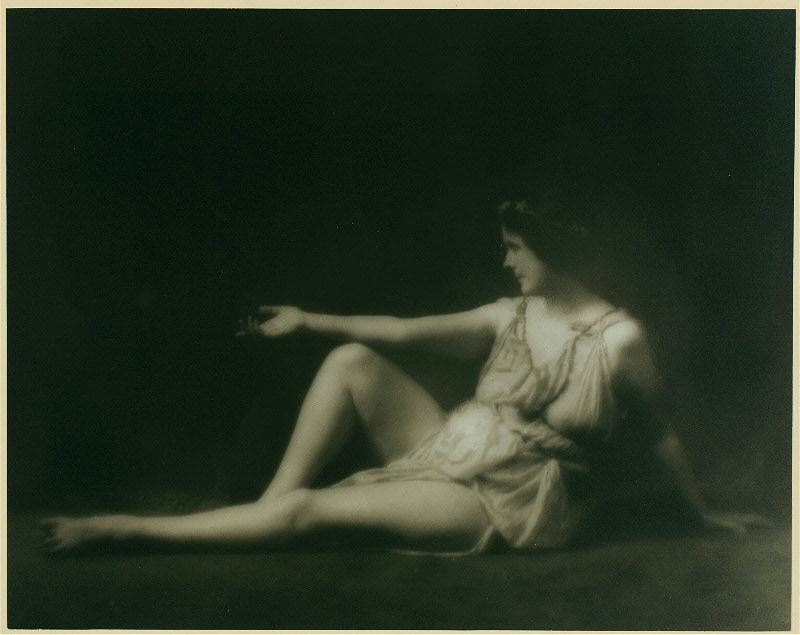
Duncan in a Greek-inspired pose and wearing her signature Greek tunic. She took inspiration from the classical Greek arts and combined them with an American athleticism to form a new philosophy of dance, in opposition to the rigidity of traditional ballet.

Breaking with convention, Duncan imagined she had traced dance to its roots as a sacred art. She developed from this notion a style of free and natural movements inspired by the classical Greek arts, folk dances, social dances, nature, and natural forces, as well as an approach to the new American athleticism which included skipping, running, jumping, leaping, and tossing. Duncan wrote of American dancing: "let them come forth with great strides, leaps and bounds, with lifted forehead and far-spread arms, to dance." Her focus on natural movement emphasized steps, such as skipping, outside of codified ballet technique.

Duncan also cited the sea as an early inspiration for her movement, and she believed movement originated from the solar plexus. Duncan placed an emphasis on "evolutionary" dance motion, insisting that each movement was born from the one that preceded it, that each movement gave rise to the next, and so on in organic succession. It is this philosophy and new dance technique that garnered Duncan the title of the creator of modern dance.

Duncan's philosophy of dance moved away from rigid ballet technique and towards what she perceived as natural movement. She said that in order to restore dance to a high art form instead of merely entertainment, she strove to connect emotions and movement: "I spent long days and nights in the studio seeking that dance which might be the divine expression of the human spirit through the medium of the body's movement." She believed dance was meant to encircle all that life had to offer—joy and sadness. Duncan took inspiration from ancient Greece and combined it with a passion for freedom of movement. This is exemplified in her revolutionary costume of a white Greek tunic and bare feet. Inspired by Greek forms, her tunics also allowed a freedom of movement that corseted ballet costumes and pointe shoes did not. Costumes were not the only inspiration Duncan took from Greece: she was also inspired by ancient Greek art, and utilized some of its forms in her movement (as shown on photos).

== Personal life ==
=== Children ===
Duncan with her children Deirdre and Patrick, in 1913

Duncan bore three children, all out of wedlock. Deirdre Beatrice was born September 24, 1906. Her father was theatre designer Gordon Craig. Patrick Augustus was born May 1, 1910, fathered by Paris Singer, one of the many sons of sewing machine magnate Isaac Singer. Deirdre and Patrick both died by drowning in 1913; while out on a car ride with their nanny, the automobile accidentally went into the River Seine. Following this tragedy, Duncan spent several months on the Greek island of Corfu with her brother and sister, then several weeks at the Viareggio seaside resort in Italy with actress Eleonora Duse.

In her autobiography, Duncan relates that in her deep despair over the deaths of her children, she begged a young Italian stranger, the sculptor Romano Romanelli, to sleep with her because she was desperate for another child. She gave birth to a son on August 13, 1914, but he died shortly after birth.

=== Relationships ===
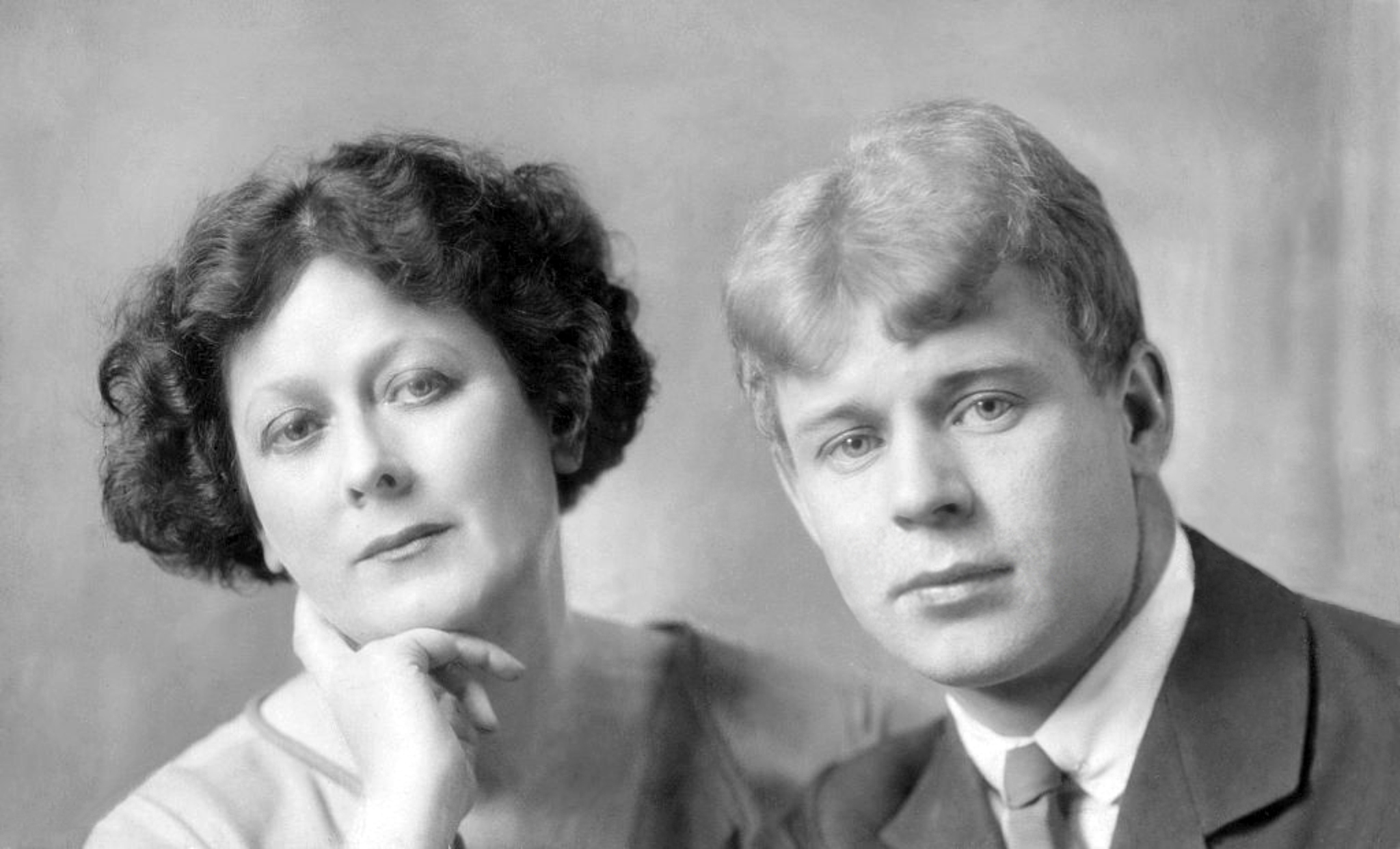
Duncan and Sergei Yesenin in 1923

When Duncan stayed at the Viareggio seaside resort with Eleonora Duse, Duse had just left a relationship with the rebellious and epicene young feminist Lina Poletti. This fueled speculation as to the nature of Duncan and Duse's relationship, but there has never been any indication that the two were involved romantically.

Duncan was loving by nature and was close to her mother, siblings and all of her male and female friends. Later on, in 1921, after the end of the Russian Revolution, Duncan moved to Moscow, where she met the poet Sergei Yesenin, who was eighteen years her junior. On May 2, 1922, they officially married, and Duncan took Soviet citizenship. After that Yesenin accompanied her on a tour of Europe and the United States. However, the marriage was brief as they grew apart while getting to know each other. In May 1923, Yesenin returned to Moscow. Two years later he was found dead in an apparent suicide.

Duncan also had a relationship with the poet and playwright Mercedes de Acosta, as documented in numerous revealing letters they wrote to each other.

However, the claim of a purported relationship made after Duncan’s death by de Acosta (a controversial figure for her alleged relations) is in dispute. Friends and relatives of Duncan believed her claim is false based on forged letters and done for publicity’s sake. In addition, Lily Dikovskaya, one of Duncan’s students from her Moscow School, wrote in In Isadora’s Steps that Duncan “was focused on higher things”.

=== Later years ===
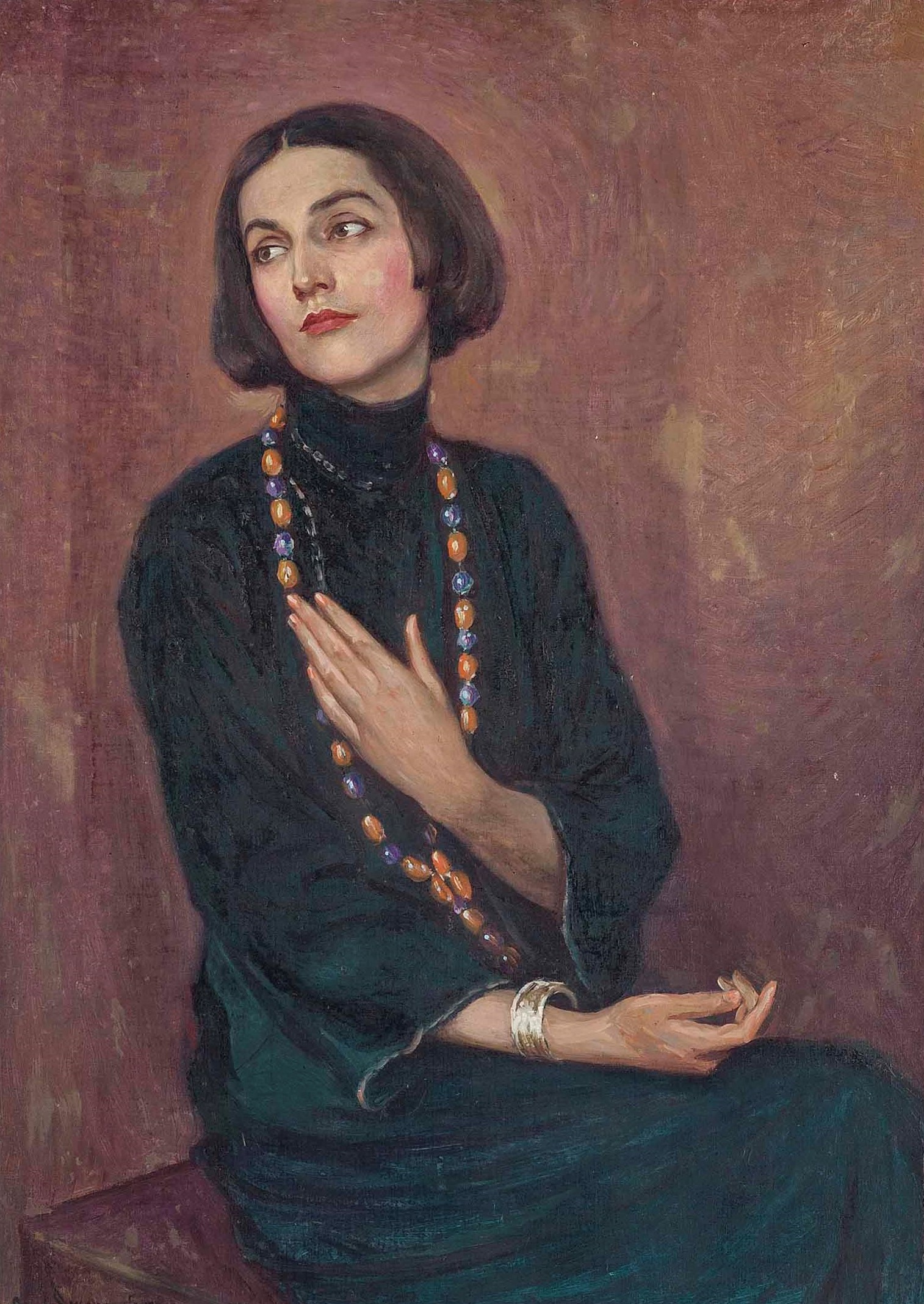
A portrait of Duncan in 1922 by dancer Paul Swan.

By the late 1920s, Duncan, in her late 40s, was depressed by the deaths of her three young children. She spent her final years financially struggling, moving between Paris and the Mediterranean, running up debts at hotels. Her autobiography My Life was published in 1927 shortly after her death. The Australian composer Percy Grainger called it a "life-enriching masterpiece."

In his book Isadora, An Intimate Portrait, Sewell Stokes, who met Duncan in the last years of her life, described her extravagant waywardness. In a reminiscent sketch, Zelda Fitzgerald wrote how she and her husband, author F. Scott Fitzgerald, sat in a Paris cafe watching a somewhat drunken Duncan. He would speak of how memorable it was, but all that Zelda recalled was that while all eyes were watching Duncan, she was able to steal the salt and pepper shakers from the table.

== Death ==
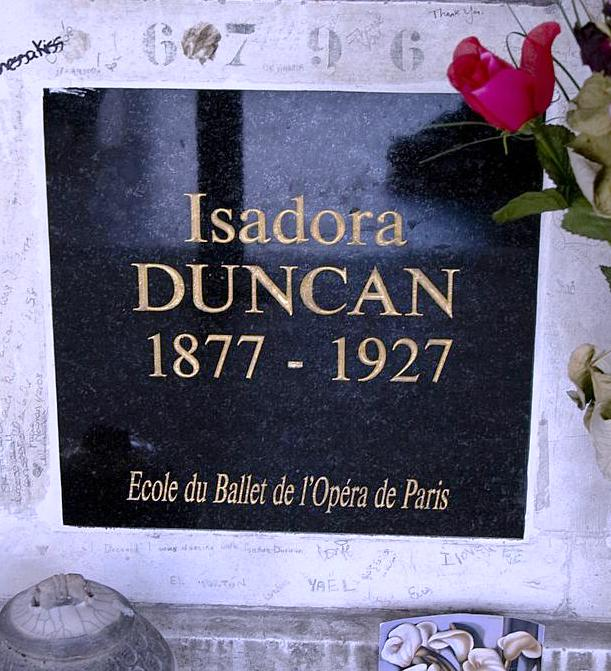
Duncan's tomb at Père Lachaise Cemetery

On September 14, 1927, in Nice, France, Duncan was a passenger in an Amilcar CGSS automobile owned by Benoît Falchetto, a French-Italian mechanic. She wore a long, flowing, hand-painted red silk shawl, created by the Russian-born artist Roman Chatov, a gift from her friend Mary Desti, the mother of American filmmaker Preston Sturges. Desti, who saw Duncan off, had asked her to wear a cape in the open-air vehicle because of the cold weather, but she would agree to wear only the shawl. As they departed, she reportedly said to Desti and some companions, "Adieu, mes amis. Je vais à la gloire! " ("Farewell, my friends. I go to glory!"); but according to the American novelist Glenway Wescott, Desti later told him that Duncan's actual parting words were, "Je vais à l'amour" ("I am off to love"). Desti considered this embarrassing, as it suggested that she and Falchetto were going to her hotel for a tryst.

Her silk shawl, draped around her neck, became entangled in the wheel well around the open-spoked wheels and rear axle, pulling her from the open car and breaking her neck. Desti said she called out to warn Duncan about the shawl almost immediately after the car left. Desti took Duncan to the hospital, where she was pronounced dead.

As The New York Times noted in its obituary, Duncan "met a tragic death at Nice on the French Riviera". "According to dispatches from Nice, Duncan was hurled in an extraordinary manner from an open automobile in which she was riding and instantly killed by the force of her fall onto the stone pavement." Other sources noted that she was almost decapitated by the sudden tightening of the shawl around her neck. The accident gave rise to Gertrude Stein's remark that "affectations can be dangerous". At the time of her death, Duncan was a Soviet citizen. Her will was the first of a Soviet citizen to undergo probate in the U.S.

Duncan was cremated, and her ashes were placed next to those of her children in the columbarium at Père Lachaise Cemetery in Paris. On the headstone of her grave is inscribed École du Ballet de l'Opéra de Paris ("Ballet School of the Opera of Paris").

== Works ==
- Duncan, Isadora (1927) "My Life" New York City: Boni & Liveright OCLC 738636
  - Project Gutenberg Canada #941 HTML HTML zipped Text Text zipped EPUB
  - My Life at Faded Page (Canada) : text, HTML, EPUB, .mobi, PDF, HTML .zip
- Duncan, Isadora; Cheney, Sheldon (ed.) The Art of the Dance. New York: Theater Arts, 1928. ISBN 0-87830-005-8
- Works by Isadora Duncan at Faded Page (Canada)
- Works by Isadora Duncan at Open Library

== Legacy ==
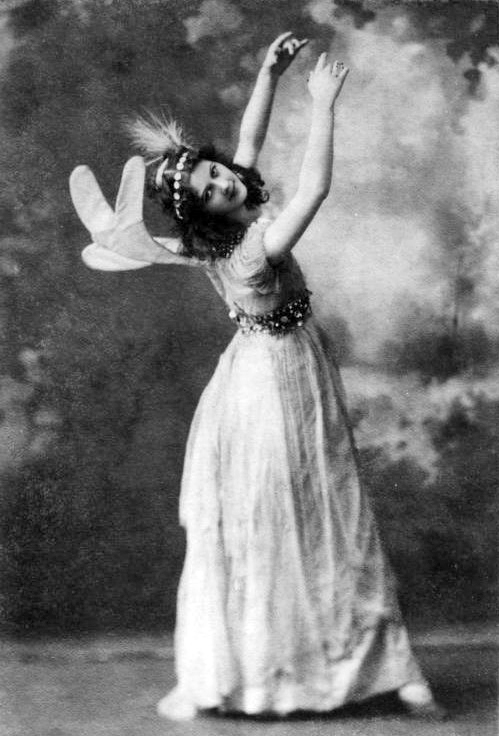
Duncan as a fairy in A Midsummer Night's Dream, 1896

Duncan is known as "The Mother of Modern Dance". While her schools in Europe did not last long, Duncan's work had an impact on the art and her style is still danced based upon the instruction of Maria-Theresa Duncan, Anna Duncan, and Irma Duncan, three of her six pupils. Through her sister, Elizabeth, Duncan's approach was adopted by Jarmila Jeřábková from Prague where her legacy persists. By 1913 she was already being celebrated. When the Théâtre des Champs-Élysées was built, Duncan's likeness was carved in its bas-relief over the entrance by sculptor Antoine Bourdelle and included in painted murals of the nine muses by Maurice Denis in the auditorium. In 1987, she was inducted into the National Museum of Dance and Hall of Fame.

Anna, Lisa, Theresa and Irma, pupils of Isadora Duncan's first school, carried on the aesthetic and pedagogical principles of Isadora's work in New York and Paris. Choreographer and dancer Julia Levien was also instrumental in furthering Duncan's work through the formation of the Duncan Dance Guild in the 1950s and the establishment of the Duncan Centenary Company in 1977.

Another means by which Duncan's dance techniques were carried forth was in the formation of the Isadora Duncan Heritage Society, by Mignon Garland, who had been taught dance by two of Duncan's key students. Garland was such a fan that she later lived in a building erected at the same site and address as Duncan, attached a commemorative plaque near the entrance, which is still there as of 2016. Garland also succeeded in having San Francisco rename an alley on the same block from Adelaide Place to Isadora Duncan Lane.

In medicine, the Isadora Duncan Syndrome refers to injury or death consequent to entanglement of neckwear with a wheel or other machinery.

== Photo gallery ==
Photographic studies of Isadora Duncan made in New York by Arnold Genthe during her visits to America in 1915–1918

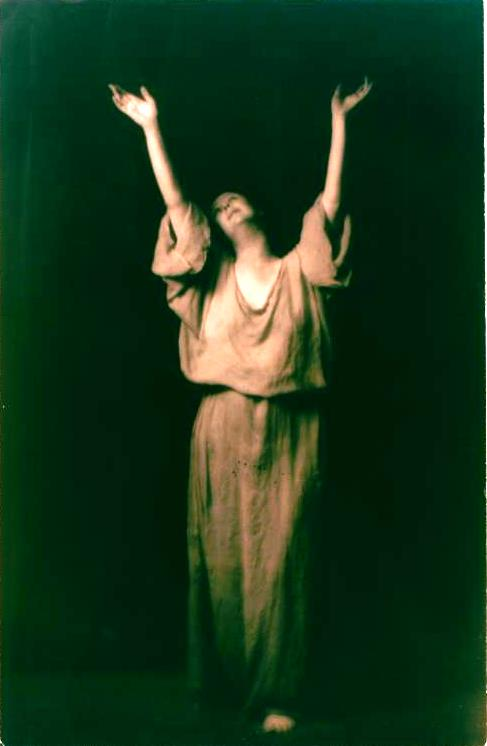

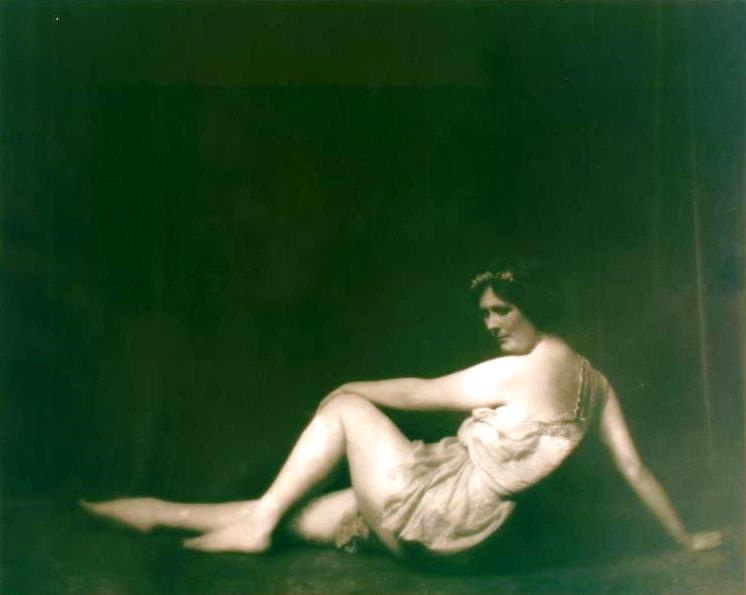

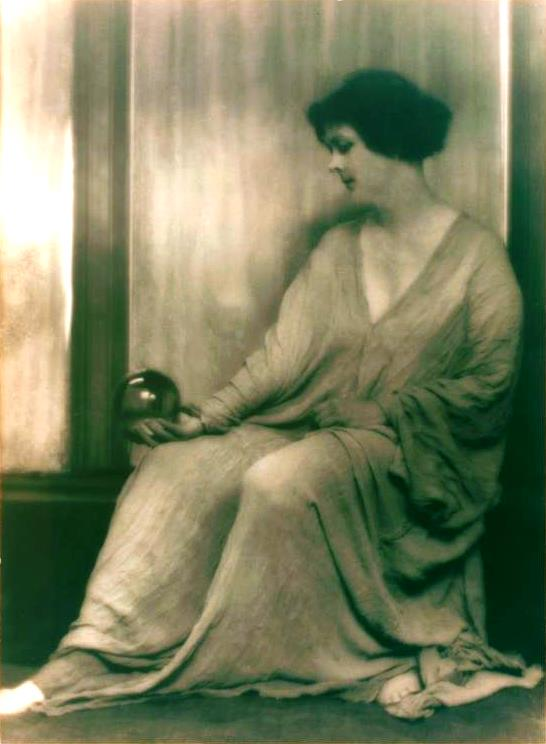

== In popular culture ==
Duncan has attracted literary and artistic attention from the 1920s to the present, in novels, film, ballet, theatre, music, and poetry.

In literature, Duncan is portrayed in:

- Aleister Crowley's Moonchild (as 'Lavinia King'), published in 1923.
- Upton Sinclair's World's End (1940) and Between Two Worlds (1941), the first two novels in his Pulitzer Prize winning Lanny Budd series.
- Amelia Gray's novel Isadora (2017).
- A Series of Unfortunate Events, in which two characters are named after her, Isadora Quagmire and Duncan Quagmire.
- The poem Fever 103 by Sylvia Plath, in which the speaker alludes to Isadora's scarves.

Among the films and television shows featuring Duncan are:

- In 1965, a youthful Isadora Duncan was portrayed by Kathy Garver in the television show Death Valley Days.
- The 1966 BBC biopic by Ken Russell, Isadora Duncan, the Biggest Dancer in the World, which was introduced by Duncan's biographer, Sewell Stokes, Duncan was played by Vivian Pickles.
- The 1968 film Isadora, nominated for the Palme d'Or at Cannes, stars Vanessa Redgrave as Duncan. The film was based in part on Duncan's autobiography. Redgrave was nominated for the Academy Award for Best Actress for her performance as Duncan.
- In 1976, Saturday Night Live parodied Isadora Duncan in a Great Moments in Herstory sketch during Season 1, Episode 15. Hosted by Jill Clayburgh, the skit featured Clayburgh as Duncan and Gilda Radner in a comedic retelling of the dancer’s tragic demise, exaggerating the absurdity of her fatal scarf accident.
- Archival footage of Duncan was used in the 1985 popular documentary That's Dancing!.
- The 1988 film Bull Durham opens with Susan Sarandon's character, Annie Savoy, naming Isadora Duncan among the list of figures from "all the major religions and most of the minor ones" that she has worshipped in addition to the Church of Baseball.
- A 1989 documentary, Isadora Duncan: Movement from the Soul, was nominated for the Grand Jury Prize at the 1989 Sundance Film Festival.
- In 2016, Lily-Rose Depp portrayed Duncan in The Dancer, a French biographical musical drama of dancer Loie Fuller.
- In the 2025 animated dramatic comedy Long Story Short the dog belonging to Shira and Kendra is named the Undeniable Isadora Duncan

Ballets based on Duncan include:

- In 1976 Frederick Ashton created a short ballet entitled Five Brahms Waltzes in the Manner of Isadora Duncan on Lynn Seymour, in which "Ashton fused Duncan's style with an imprint of his own"; Marie Rambert claimed after seeing it that it was exactly as she remembered Duncan dancing.
- In 1981, she was the subject of a ballet, Isadora, written and choreographed by the Royal Ballet's Kenneth MacMillan, and performed at Covent Garden.

On the theatre stage, Duncan is portrayed in:

- A 1991 stage play When She Danced by Martin Sherman about Duncan's later years, won the Evening Standard Award for Vanessa Redgrave as Best Actress.

Duncan is featured in music in:

- Celia Cruz recorded a track titled Isadora Duncan with the Fania All-Stars for the album Cross Over released in 1979.
- Rock musician Vic Chesnutt included a song about Duncan on his debut album Little.
- The Magnetic Fields song "Jeremy" on their second album The Wayward Bus refers to Duncan and her "impossibly long white scarves."
- Post-hardcore band Burden of a Day's 2009 album Oneonethousand features a track titled "Isadora Duncan". The lyrics include references to a letter Duncan wrote to poet Mercedes de Acosta and her reported last words of "Je vais à l'amour."

== See also ==
- Dancer in a Café—Painting by Jean Metzinger
- Isidora, sometimes spelled Isadora
- List of barefooters
- List of dancers
- Women in dance

== Bibliography ==
- De Fina, Pamela. Maria Theresa: Divine Being, Guided by a Higher Order. Pittsburgh: Dorrance, 2003. ISBN 0-8059-4960-7
  - About Duncan's adopted daughter; Pamela De Fina, student and protégée of Maria Theresa Duncan from 1979 to 1987 in New York City, received original choreography, which is held at the New York Library for the Performing Arts at Lincoln Center.
- Duncan, Anna. Anna Duncan: In the footsteps of Isadora. Stockholm: Dansmuseet, 1995. ISBN 91-630-3782-3
- Duncan, Doralee; Pratl, Carol and Splatt, Cynthia (eds.) Life Into Art. Isadora Duncan and Her World. Foreword by Agnes de Mille. Text by Cynthia Splatt. Hardcover. 199 pages. W. W. Norton & Company, 1993. ISBN 0-393-03507-7
- Duncan, Irma. The Technique of Isadora Duncan. Illustrated. Photographs by Hans V. Briesex. Posed by Isadora, Irma and the Duncan pupils. Austria: Karl Piller, 1937. ISBN 0-87127-028-5
- Kurth, Peter. Isadora: A Sensational Life. Little Brown, 2001. ISBN 0-316-50726-1
- Levien, Julia. Duncan Dance: A Guide for Young People Ages Six to Sixteen. Illustrated. Dance Horizons, 1994. ISBN 0-87127-198-2
- Peter, Frank-Manuel (ed.) Isadora & Elizabeth Duncan in Germany. Cologne: Wienand Verlag, 2000. ISBN 3-87909-645-7
- Savinio, Alberto. Isadora Duncan, in Narrate, uomini, la vostra storia. Bompiani,1942, Adelphi, 1984.
- Schanke, Robert That Furious Lesbian: The Story of Mercedes de Acosta. Carbondale, Ill: Southern Illinois Press, 2003.
- Stokes, Sewell. Isadora, an Intimate Portrait. New York: Brentanno's Ltd, 1928.
- Sturges, Preston; Sturges, Sandy (adapt. & ed.) (1991), Preston Sturges on Preston Sturges, Boston: Faber & Faber, ISBN 0-571-16425-0
