= Amilcar =

1921–1939 automotive brand manufacturer

- Industry: Manufacturing
- Founded: 1921
- Founder: Joseph Lamy; Émile Akar
- Defunct: 1939
- Headquarters: Saint-Denis (France)
- Key people: André Morel
- Products: Cars

The Amilcar was a French automobile manufactured from 1921 to 1940.

== History ==
=== Foundation and location ===
Amilcar was founded in July 1921 by Joseph Lamy and Emile Akar. The name "Amilcar" was an imperfect anagram of the partners' names. The business was established at 34 rue du Chemin-Vert in the 11th arrondissement of Paris. However, Amilcar quickly outgrew their restricted city-centre premises, and during the middle part of 1924 the company relocated to Saint-Denis on the northern edge of the city.

=== Early years ===
The original Amilcar was a small cyclecar. Designed by Jules Salomon and Edmond Moyet, it bore a striking resemblance to the pre-war Le Zèbre. The vehicle was first exhibited at the Paris Motor Show in October 1921. The business was a leading beneficiary of a cyclecar boom, prompted by a government initiative which held out the promise of a reduced rate of annual car tax, fixed at 100 francs per year, for powered vehicles weighing no more than 350 kg (dry weight, without fuel or water or such extras as a spare tyre/wheel), providing seating for no more than two people and powered by an engine of not more than 1100 cc. Once a vehicle exceeded these limits it ceased to be a cyclecar and was instead officially designated a voiturette.

The 4-cylinder, 903cc Amilcar CC appeared in 1922, with a wheelbase of just 2,320 mm (91 in). The CC subsequently became available in two further versions; the Amilcar C4 was a slightly longer sports car, while the CS, introduced in 1924, was a brisker sports version with the engine size increased to 1004 cc. The side-valve engine had splash lubrication, and came with a three-speed gearbox. The most famous model of all was the CGS "Grand Sport" of 1924; this featured a 1074 cc sv engine and four-wheel brakes. This in turn evolved into the more sporty CGSS "Grand Sport Surbaissé". These models were built under license in Germany (as the Pluto) and in Austria (as the Grofri) and in Italy (as Amilcar Italiana). The marque entered automobile racing in the mid-1920s with a batch of supercharged double overhead camshaft 1100 cc six-cylinder cars that used a roller bearing crankshaft in the full racing version; these vehicles were also available with plain metal bearings, driven by famous race driver André Morel.

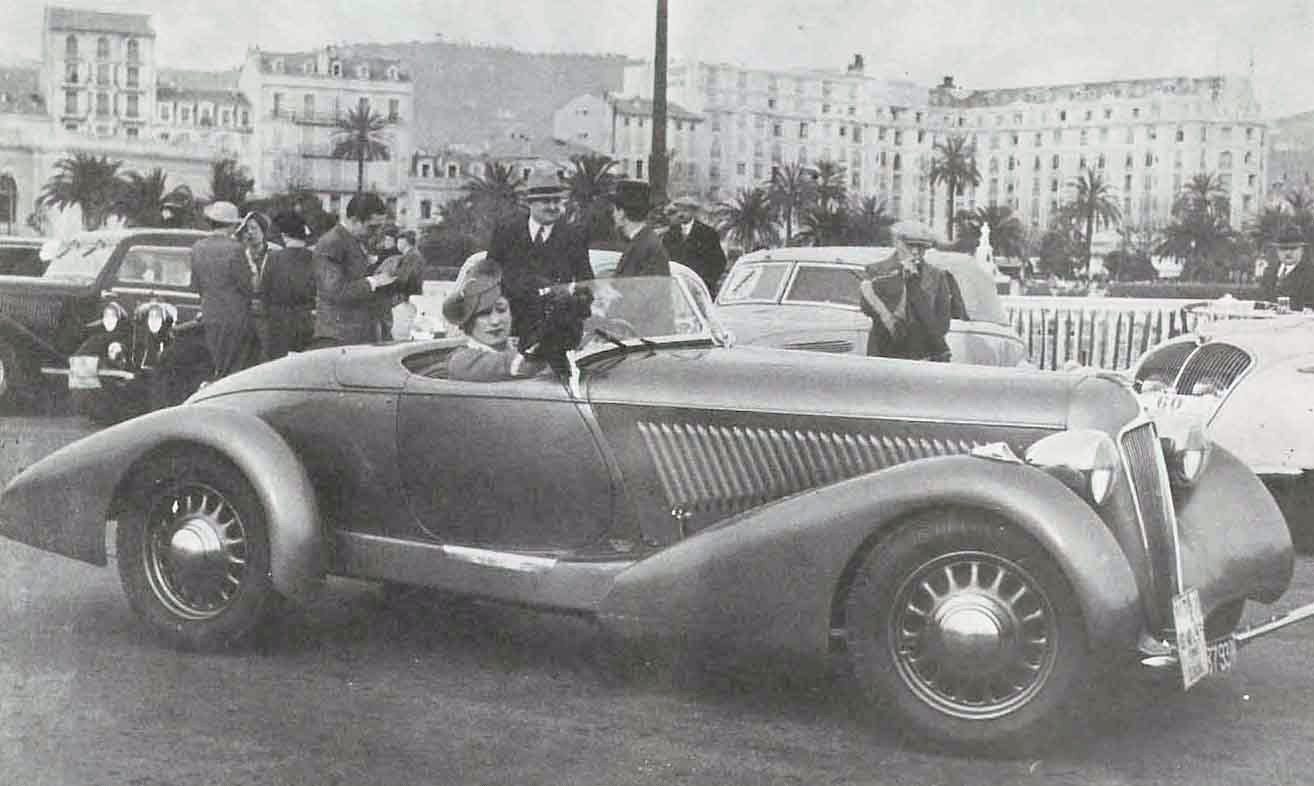
Amilcar Racer

=== Financial challenges and the loss of independence ===
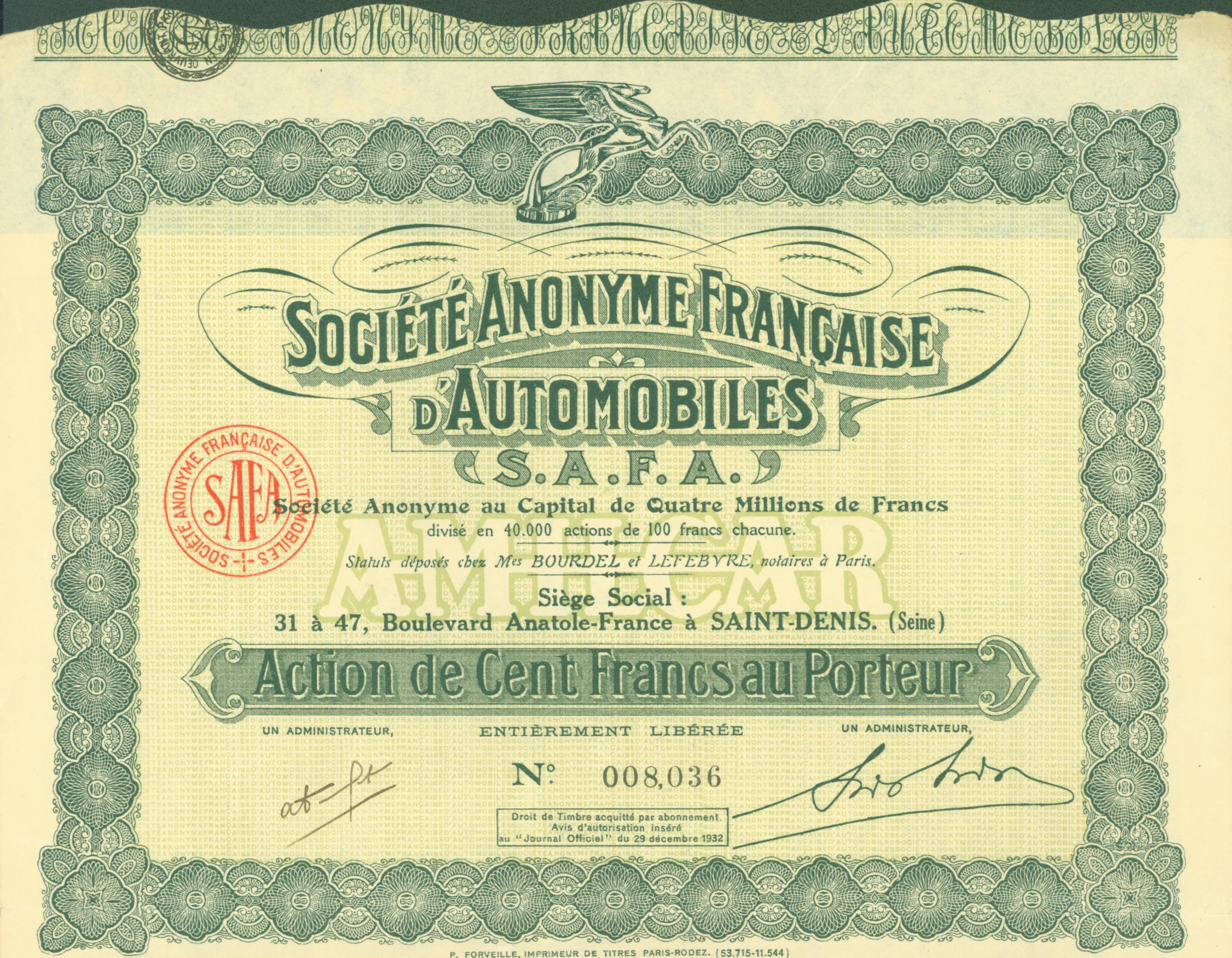
Share of the S. A. Française d'Automobiles, issued 29 December 1932

During the later 1920s the company expanded out of its original comfort zone of small economical cars: the results were mixed. The founders, Akar and Lamy, becoming less involved with the management of the business, were persuaded to conclude, in 1931, a business agreement with André Briès and Marcel Sée. Sée already knew Amilcar from the inside, having in January 1929 been dismissed from a position involved in management of the company. The early 1930s were years of economic crisis in France, and at the end of 1933 a company owned by Briès and Sée, called "Sofia" (Societe financiere pour l'automobile), took effective control of Amilcar, which nevertheless continued to function under its existing name.

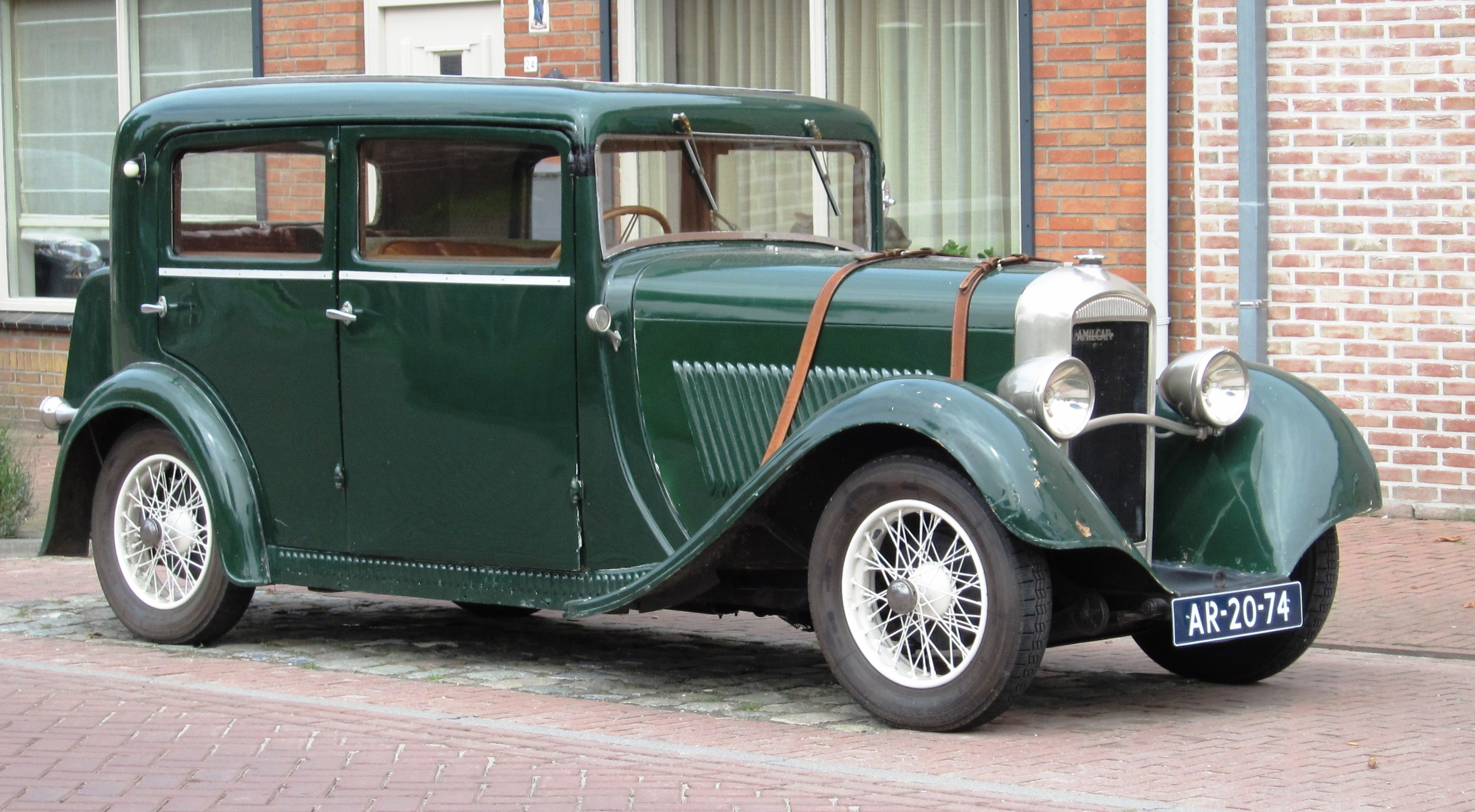
Amilcar M2 (1932)

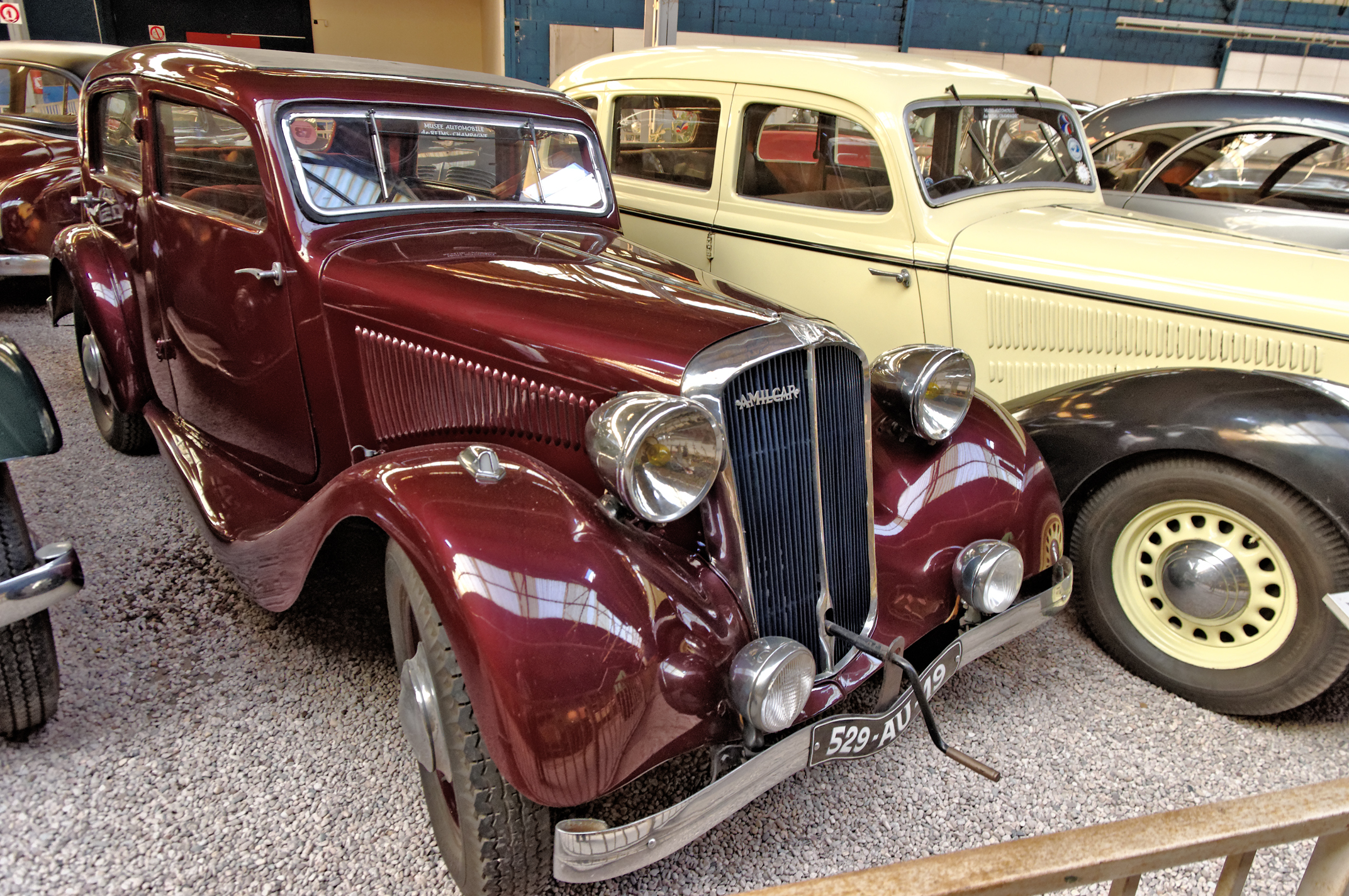
Amilcar Pégase (1935)

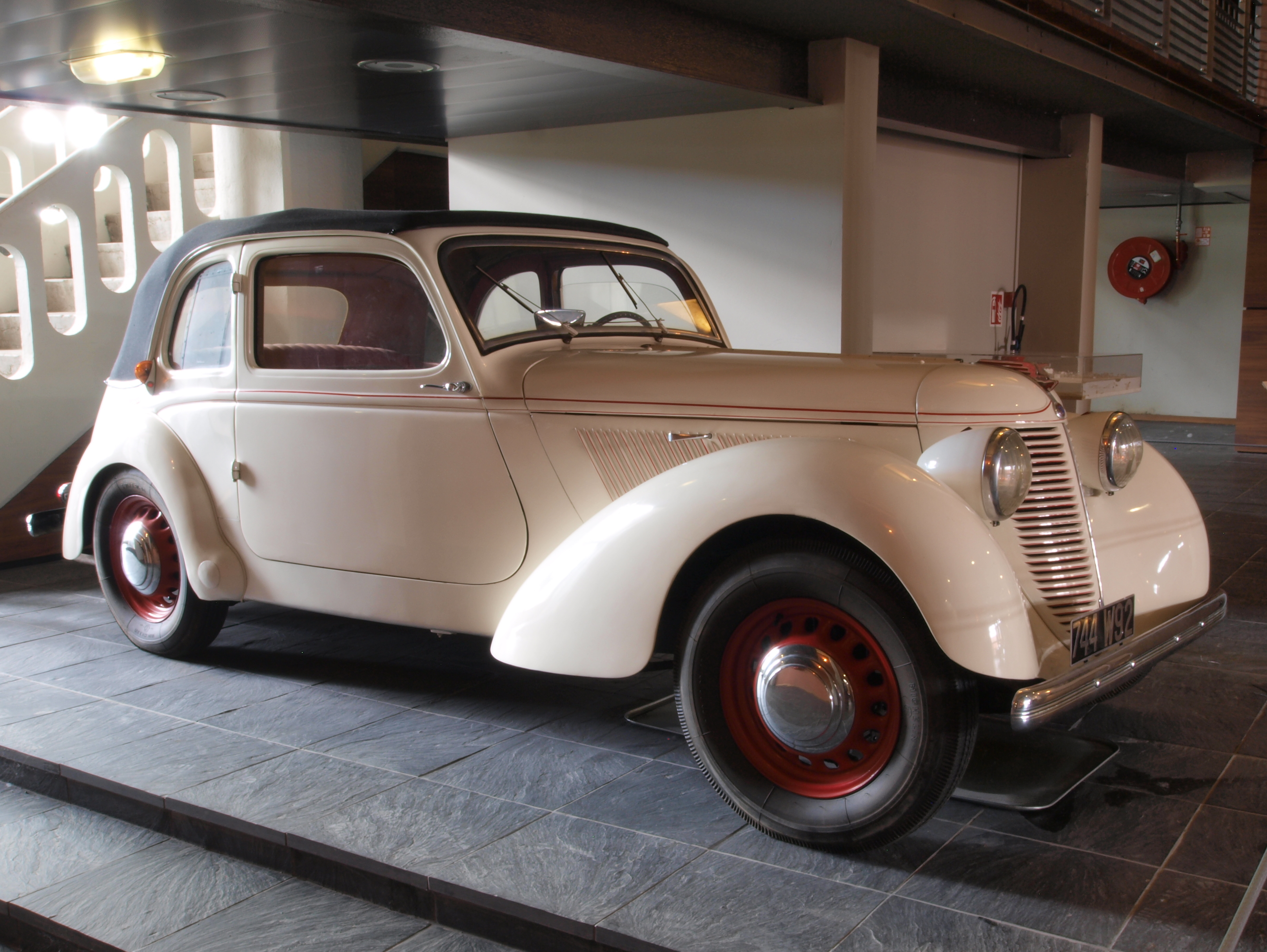
Amilcar Compound (ca 1939)

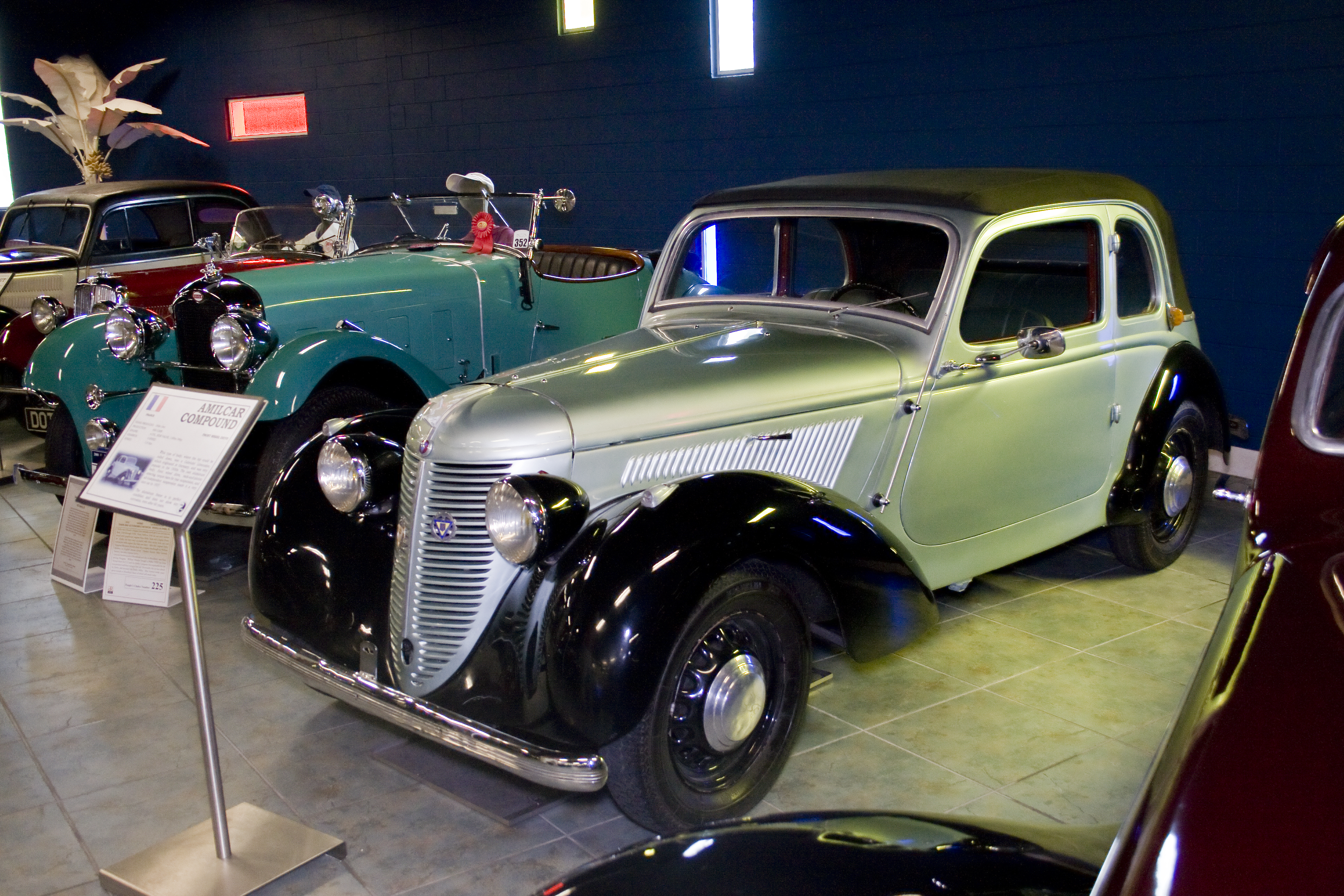
Amilcar Compound

From 1928 the company offered a light touring car; called the "M-Type", it featured a side-valve 1200 cc engine and was launched in 1928. It was followed by the M2, M3, and M4 versions. The M-type and its successors continued to be produced through the ensuing years of financial difficulty, offered for sale till 1935, though production probably ended in 1934. 1928 saw the introduction of a straight eight, which was built with an OHC 2.3-liter engine. This, the C8, proved unreliable, and soon disappeared with only a few hundred produced.

The acquisition of Amilcar by "Sofia" in 1933 did not in itself resolve the financial pressures. At the end of August 1934, still faced with disappointing sales volumes, the factory at Saint-Denis closed for the last time, as management struggled to save the business. A new model was clearly needed and in October 1934 the company presented the new 2-litre (12CV) Amilcar Pégase powered by a 4-cylinder, ohv 2150 cc engine supplied by Delahaye. There was also a competition version of the Pégase with a 2490 cc (14CV) engine. By October 1935, the smaller Amilcar models having been discontinued, the Pégase, produced under much reduced circumstances at premises in Boulogne-Billancourt, was the only Amilcar model listed.

=== Another change of control ===
Recognising the impossibility of sustaining the Amilcar business with a single model, but unsure of how to finance or produce another, management turned to Hotchkiss which had recently taken a large shareholding in "Sofia", Amilcar's holding company. Hotchkiss had problems of their own at this time, their hugely lucrative armaments business having recently been nationalised by the left-wing Blum government, while their middle-market automobile business was under increasing pressure as volume automakers became more effective in pushing their own ranges upmarket with models such as the Peugeot 402 and the Citroën Traction. Henry Mann Ainsworth, the Automobile Director at Hotchkiss, had already been presented, by the high-profile engineer Jean-Albert Grégoire, with a promising prototype (at that stage based on an Adler chassis) for a lightweight 7CV category, small, technically advanced family car. It was agreed that the automotive businesses of Hotchkiss and Amilcar would be merged and the prototype would be developed into an Amilcar model that would become the Amilcar Compound.

The front-wheel-drive Amilcar Compound was technically advanced in design for its era, featuring a monocoque frame made of a light alloy and independent suspension all around. Its engine at launch was a four-cylinder side-valve unit of 1185 cc. The Compound's ambitious use of aluminium in its body structure and its front-wheel-drive configuration meant that production got off to a slow start, and although it was launched in October 1937, 584 of the 681 passenger cars produced date only from 1939, with a further 64 produced during the early months of 1940, before the German invasion of May/June 1940 effectively ended civilian automobile production in the Paris region. Production prototypes for an upgraded Compound with an OHV 1340 cc engine were running by the summer of 1939, and this version was scheduled for an October launch at the 1939 Paris Motor Show, but the motor show was cancelled and the launch was postponed – as matters turned out indefinitely – due to the intervention of war which France (and Britain) declared against Germany in early September 1939.

Production of the Amilcar was not resumed after World War II.

== List of important Amilcar models ==
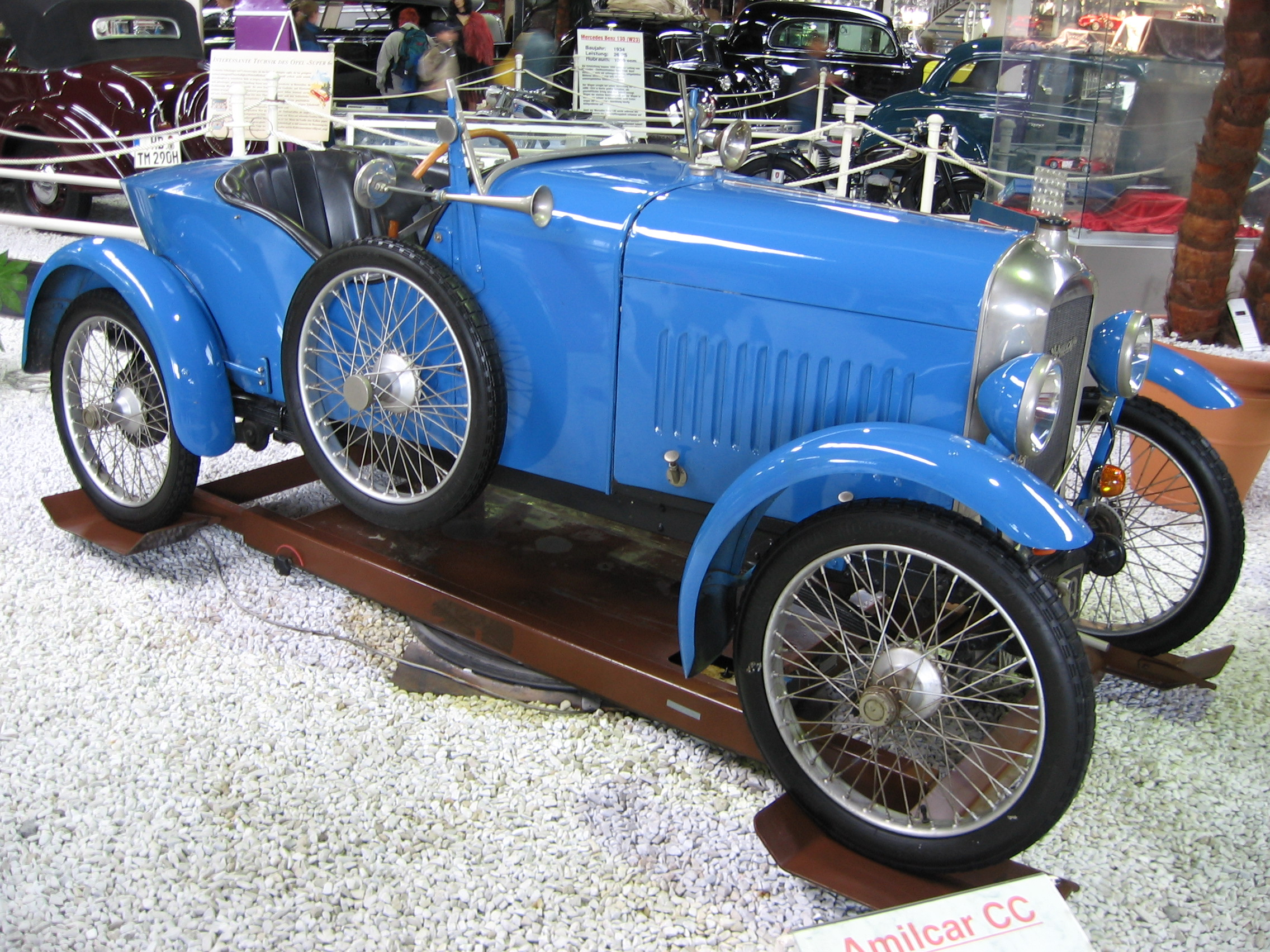
1921 Amilcar CC racecar.

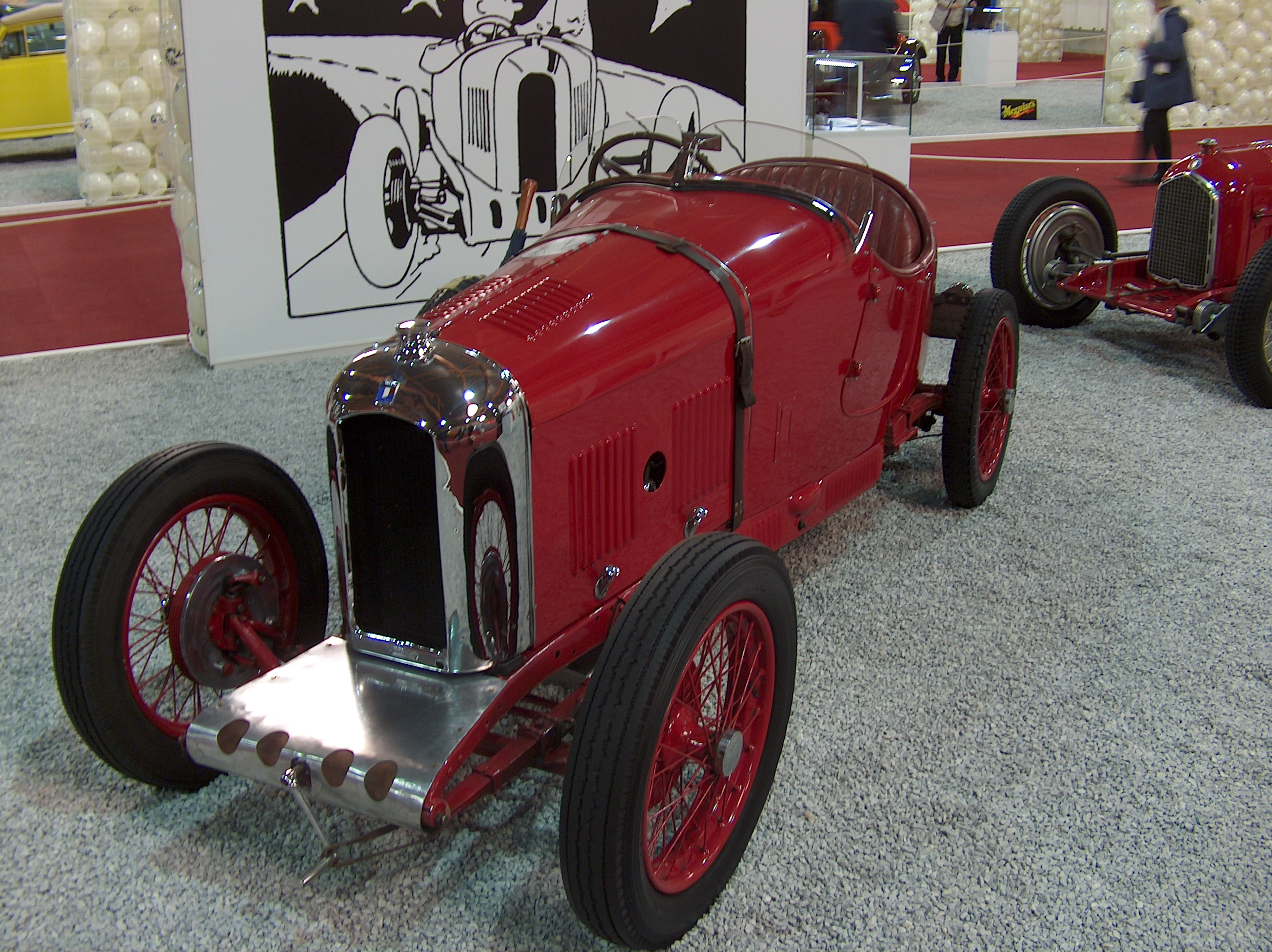
Amilcar CGSS sport 1927

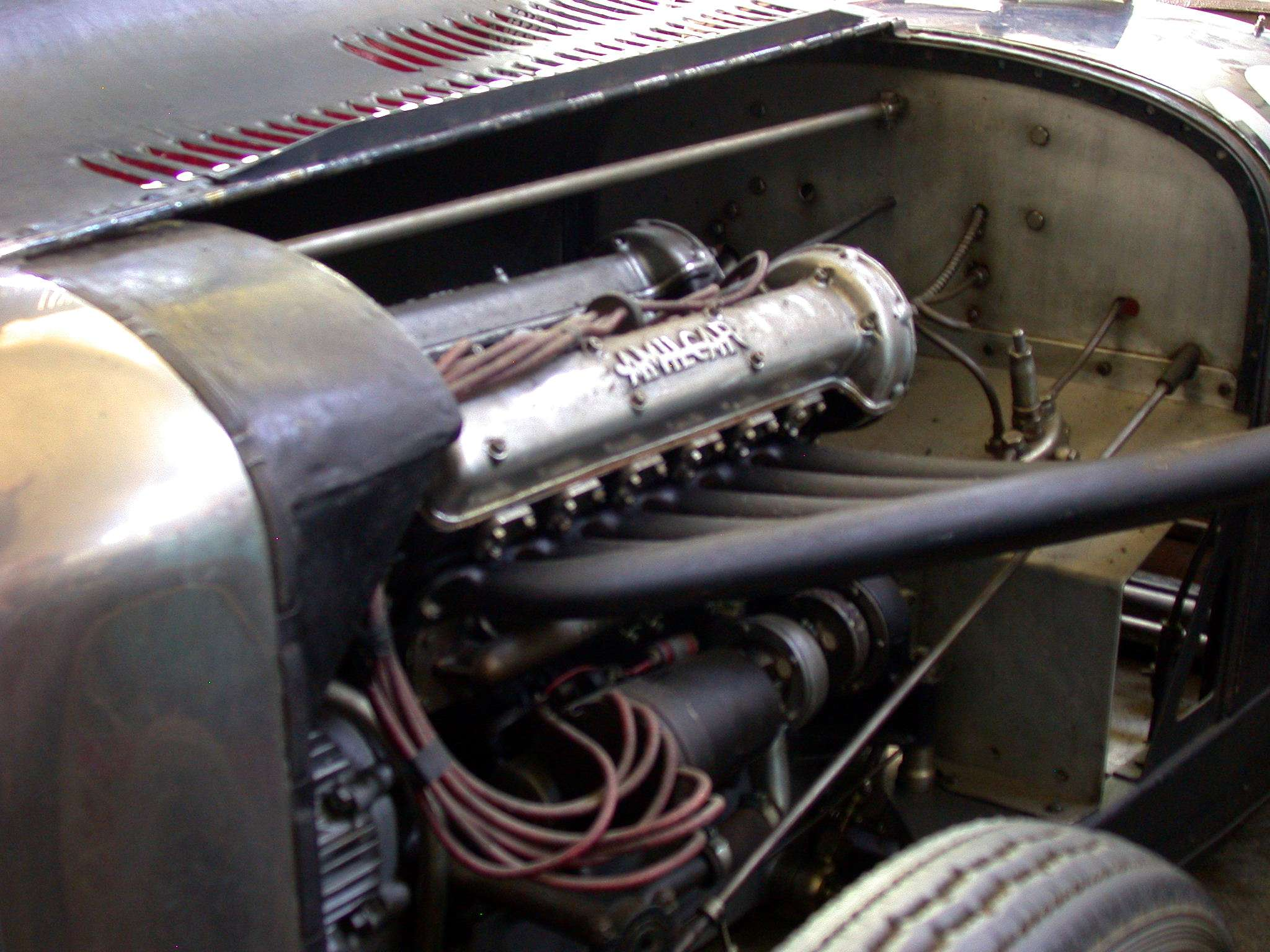
Amilcar CO, supercharged engine

- 1922 Amilcar CC
- 1922 Amilcar C4
- 1923 Amilcar E
- 1924 Amilcar CGS
- 1925 Amilcar CS
- 1926 Amilcar CGSS
- 1927 Amilcar C6
- 1928 Amilcar M
- 1929 Amilcar C8
- 1930 Amilcar C8 bis
- 1930 Amilcar CS8
- 1934 Amilcar Pégase
- 1938 Amilcar Compound aka B38, sedans being in regular manufacture from 1938 to 1940
