= Amilcar Italiana =

Car manufracturer

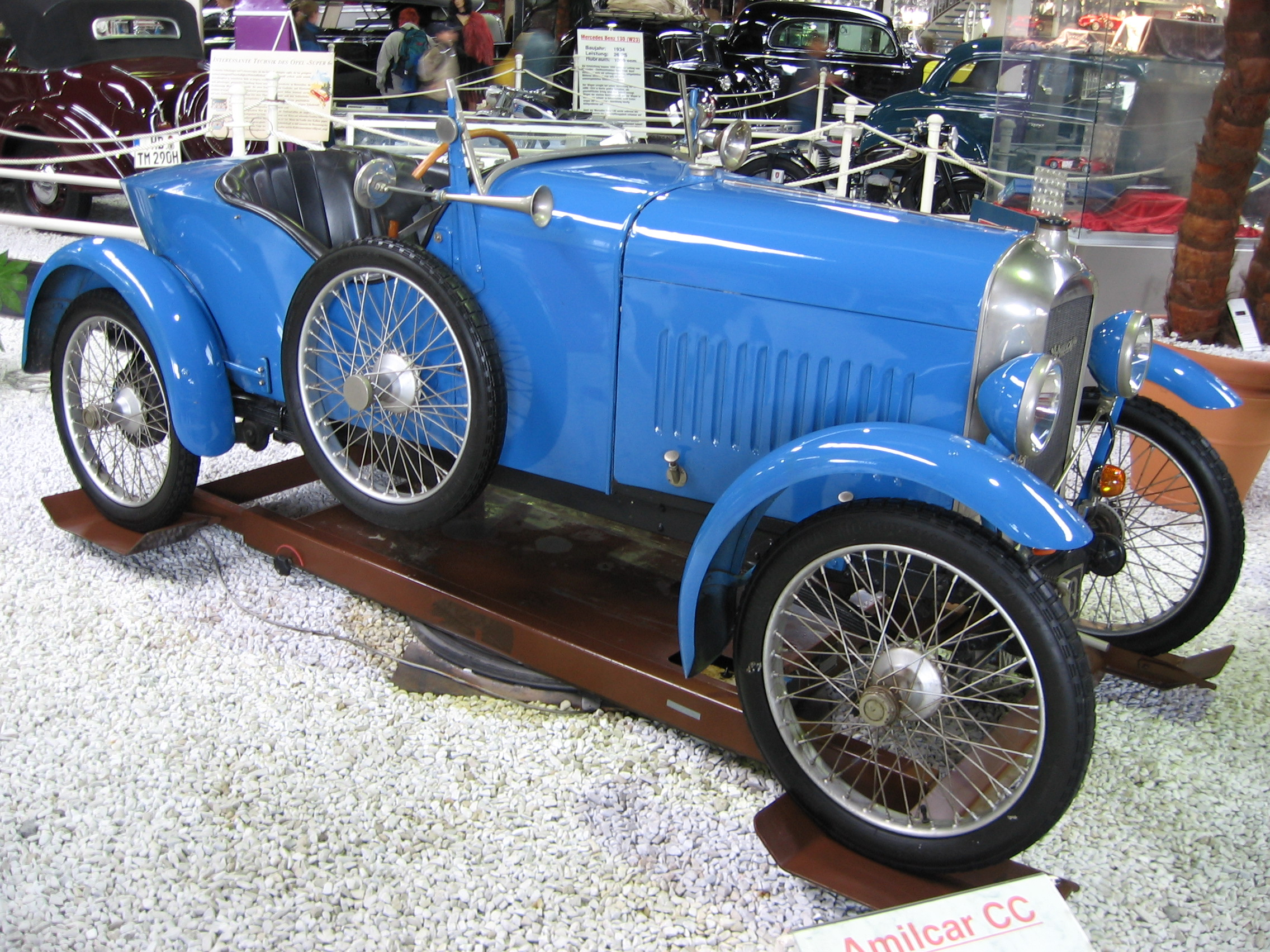
- 1921 Amilcar CC
- Industry: Automotive
- Founded: 1925

Amilcar Italiana manufactured some French Amilcar automobile models in Italy from 1925 to 1928 under licence granted in 1925 to Compagnia Generale Automobili S.A., of Rome to build cyclecars and in 1927 to Societa Industriale Lombardo Veneta Automobili of Verona.

== See also ==
- List of automobile manufacturers
