= Amilcar C4 =

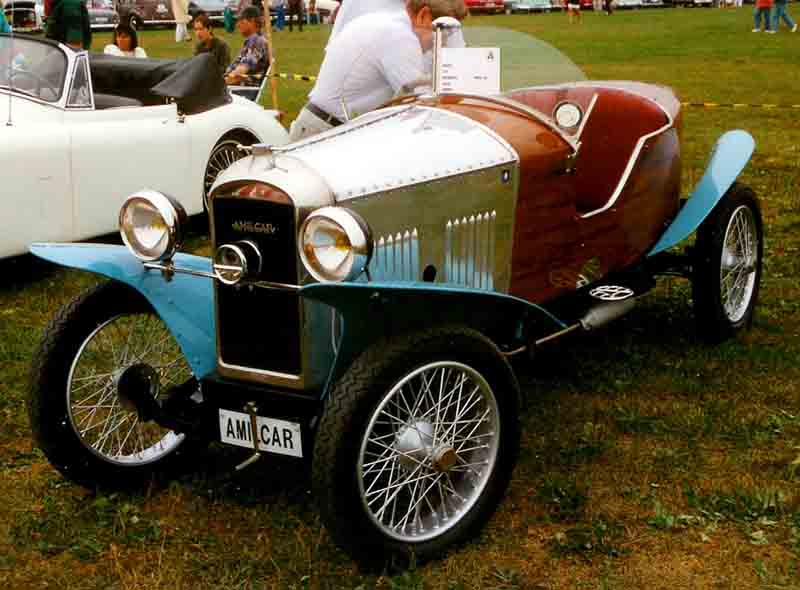
- Amilcar C4 2-Seater Sports 1923

Overview
- Manufacturer: Amilcar
- Production: 1922–1929

Body and chassis
- Class: Roadster

Powertrain
- Engine: 1003 cc four-cylinder
- Transmission: Three speed manual

Dimensions
- Wheelbase: 96.5 in (2,450 mm)

The Amilcar C4 is a light sporting car designed for road use made between 1922 and 1929 by the French Amilcar company. The C4 is one of three models introduced by Amilcar in 1922; the others were the CC and the CS, both of which were significantly different from the C4, although they did use the same chassis (which was lengthened for use in the C4). The C4 was touted as a more economical and usable vehicle than the other more sporty models. The C4, publicly introduced at the Paris Salon, was offered in three models: the highest-produced was the "Torpedo", which was offered in full Torpedo style or slightly toned down ("Torpedo Skiff"); both were available configured with 2, 3 or 4 seats. Also available were a sedan (of classical 1920s layout), and a commercial version (usable to deliver small or light articles).

The variety of styles available provided a wide selection to the public; this fact combined with the models' low initial cost and moderate operating costs caused the C4 to be fairly popular during its eight-year production run.

== Description ==
The C4 chassis is a lengthened version (by 14 cm) of that of the Amilcar CC model. Coachwork for this vehicle was fabricated by subcontractors and delivered to the Amilcar for final assembly.

Power for the C4 was provided by the same unit used in the CS, a 1003 cc four-cylinder engine (two valves per cylinder) with a 58.0 millimetres (2.3 in) bore, a 95.0 millimetres (3.7 in) stroke, a magneto ignition AND Solex carburetor; it was rated at 22 KW at 2800 rpm. The vehicle transmission (which was also used in the CC and CS models, the only difference being the longer length of the gearshift levers, necessitated by the longer chassis) provided three speeds, with power being sent to the rear wheels (a differential was not used on the rear-wheel power distribution scheme until the 1925 model, however). The suspension used semi-elliptic leaf springs in both the front and rear as well as fitted friction type dampers.

Brakes were only provided on the rear wheels. The drum-type brakes were 220 mm diameter (increased to 225 mm in 1928), and were operated by foot-pedal, which differed from the hand-lever operation employed in both the CS and CC automobiles.

Standard equipment was ample for the period, consisting of a speedometer with recording odometer, an ammeter, and the dashboard incorporating lighting. The horn initially was a classical trumpet with rubber bulb; this was replaced by an electric horn beginning in 1925.

== See also ==
- Amilcar CC
- Fiat 509
- Citroën Type C
