= Amilcar M =

Amilcar Type M (1928-29) Amilcar Type M2 (1929-31) Amilcar Type M3 (1931-35) Amilcar Type M4 (1933-34)
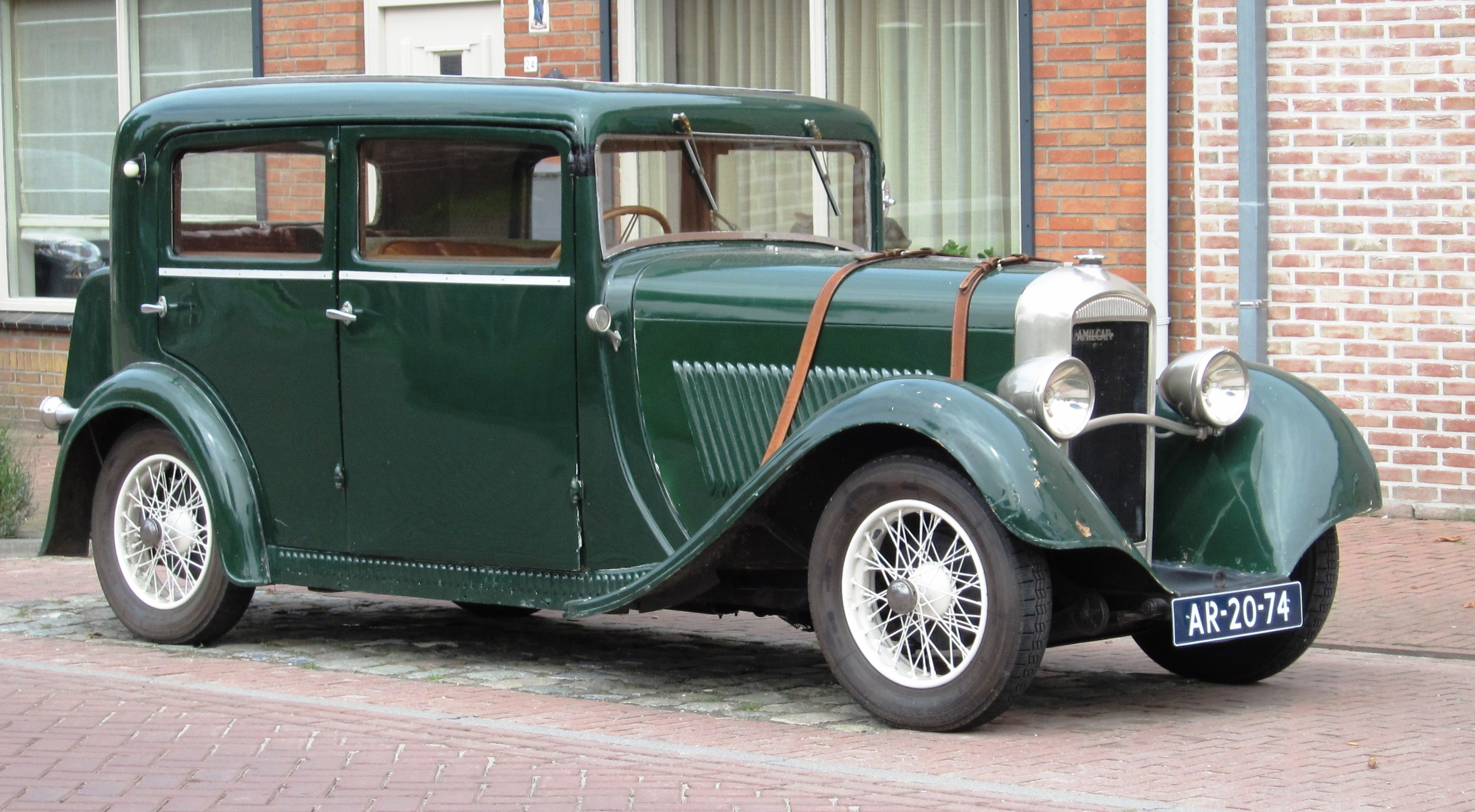
- Amilcar M2 Berline, 1932

Overview
- Manufacturer: Amilcar
- Production: 1928–1935

Body and chassis
- Class: 7CV (1928-35); 9CV (1933-34)
- Body style: saloon/sedan coupé cabriolet roadster

Powertrain
- Engine: 1244 cc sv I4 (M, M2, M3); 1628 cc sv I4 (M4)
- Transmission: Four-speed manual

Dimensions
- Wheelbase: M, M2: 2,650 mm (104.3 in); M3, M4: 2,675 mm (105.3 in)

Chronology
- Successor: Amilcar Compound

The Amilcar M is a mid-sized car, initially in the 7CV car tax band, made between 1928 and 1935 by the French Amilcar company. Most of the cars were delivered with a boxy four door “berline” body characteristic of the late 1920s.

== Branding and design ==
Initially the car was simply known as the Amilcar Type M, launched in an attempt by the manufacturer to recover from the fiasco of the preceding Types "G" and "L". Amilcar had earlier gained reputation and market share as producers of cyclecars in the lean years that followed the First World War, but as consumer spending power grew in the later 1920s, the company’s attempts to expand upmarket, had met with only limited success. The Type M sold better than the Type L, from which it inherited most of its mechanical elements including, in particular, its 4-cylinder 1244cc side-valve engine for which a maximum output of 27 hp (20 kW) was listed. Top speed would have varied according to the weight and style of the body specified, but a maximum of approximately 110 km/h (68 mph) was quoted.

Power was transferred from the front-mounted engine to the rear wheels via a four-speed manual gearbox. The suspension combined leaf springs with Hartford dampers, front and back.

== Upgraded models ==
In 1929 the Type M was replaced with the Type M2, incorporating minor improvements. The process was repeated in 1931 when the Type M3, incorporating further modest upgrades, took over from the M2. The Type M3 continued to be offered until 1935. At the 1933 Paris Show, for the 1934 model year, the manufacturer also announced the Type M4. This version combined the chassis of the existing car with a larger, 1,628 cc engine and which was intended to compete higher up in the market hierarchy. The M4 landed in the 9CV tax category; the engine produced 37 hp (27 kW). These were nevertheless difficult times for Amilcar: In August 1934 the manufacturer closed the doors of their factory at Saint-Denis for the last time, and, although for the time being production continued in a smaller factory in the Paris region, the scale of operations was necessarily reduced. Production of the M4 was not restarted and by the end of 1935 the Type M3 had also been withdrawn, leaving Amilcar with a range consisting of a single model.

== Commercial performance ==
In volume terms, despite outselling similarly sized predecessor models, the Type M never sold in huge numbers, with approximately 2,650 Type M2's emerging from the plant between 1928 and 1931 and a further 2,700 Type M3's between 1931 and 1935. These numbers fell well short of those being achieved by volume automakers such as Peugeot and Citroën during the 1930s, and with the French auto-market appearing to divide rather starkly between high volume producers of small to medium sized cars and low volume producers of larger more luxurious cars, the underwhelming volumes achieved by Amilcar’s middle market cars left the company’s finances, already burdened by debts built up at least in part to finance an extensive race programme in the 1920s, looking unsustainable.

== Successor ==
In the event, the Type M did in fact have an Amilcar successor in the form of the innovative Amilcar Compound, exhibited at the Paris Motor Show in October 1937. By that time, however, Amilcar had lost its independence, and become little more than a badge for a model financed and produced by the Hotchkiss company which had rescued Amilcar at the time of its most recent financial collapse.
