= André Morel =

French racing driver (1884–1961)

- Born: André Paul Victor Morel; 3 August 1884 Buchères, Aube, France
- Died: 17 July 1961 (aged 72) Lyon, France

Racing career
- Teams: Amilcar, Delage, Voisin, Talbot, Le Zebre
- Wins: 58 wins, 43 world records

André Paul Victor Morel (3 August 1884 – 17 July 1961) was a French racing driver.

== Life and career ==
Morel was born on 3 August 1884 in Troyes, France. His father died when he was 11. His parents at that time expected him Morel to become a priest or butcher. After dipping his toes into both careers, he switched to the automotive field.

When Morel made his way to Lyon, he was obliged to work his way up; having no diplomas or degrees, he began washing windows and negotiating used cars. Between 1911 and 1914, Morel managed a mechanic workshop that repaired and sold automobiles and represented the brands Berliet and Le Zèbre. During World War I, he was deemed unfit for combat and was sent to work in a munitions factory.

After the war, on 1 April 1919, Morel was hired as a commercial inspector by Le Zèbre. Soon, Amilcar was created by André Morel, Edmond Moyet, Emile Akar and Joseph Lamy. The name "Amilcar" was formally registered on 29 July 1921 and was loosely based on an anagram, using letters (adjusted to replace the "k" and the "y") from the names of two of the company's founders, Lamy and Akar.

As the Amilcar business grew, Morel began his great racing career. He won many races, including the French Constructor Championship in 1922.

Later, on 26 August 1928 at Arpajon, speed records were officially broken: the 1270 cc was recorded achieving 211 km/h under harsh wet conditions, and the 1100cc (car) at 207 km/h.

Andre Morel raced with Delage in 1925 with Albert Divo and won the San Sebastián Grand Prix.

March 1929 ended Amilcar's race era. Shortly afterwards, André Morel left Amilcar. While he was racing for Amilcar, Morel was also racing for Voisin. The two companies never competed against one another. Then, Morel met back up with Lamy, and in April 1929, Morel was named representative for the Hudson and Essex brands. Driving an Essex, Morel won the automobile Tour de France. Later Morel raced with Talbot, his last race being at Le Mans in 1952.

Near the end of his life, Morel was elected the vice president of the Racers Society. On 3 August 1961 André Morel died in the suburbs of Lyon, due to some illness.

The most comprehensive historical work on André Morel has been compiled by Philip Schram and is published at www.lezebre.eu. A DVD was published that includes the Le Zebre portion of André Morel's resume.

== Gallery ==
Andre Morel gallery

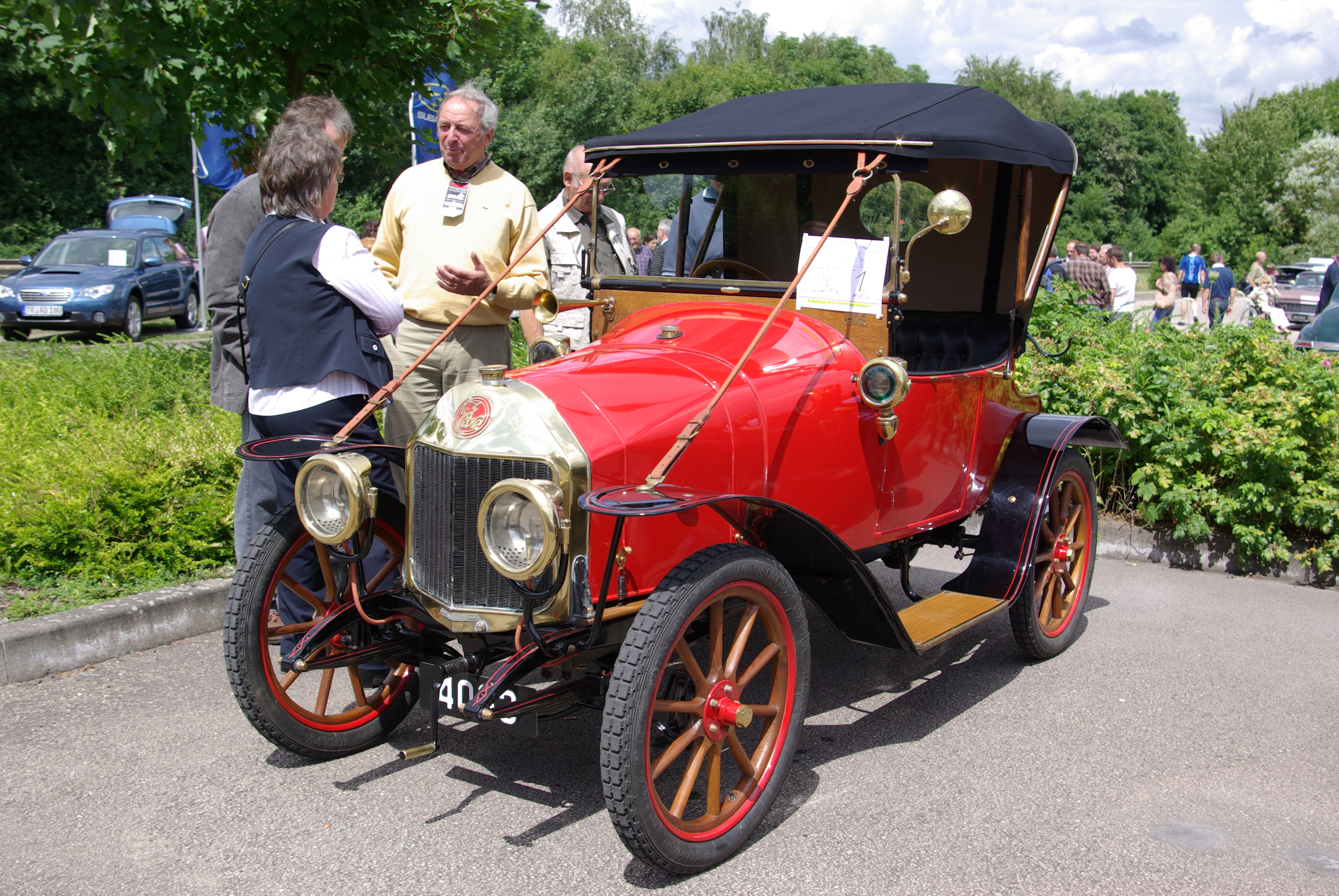
Le Zebre C5, 1913

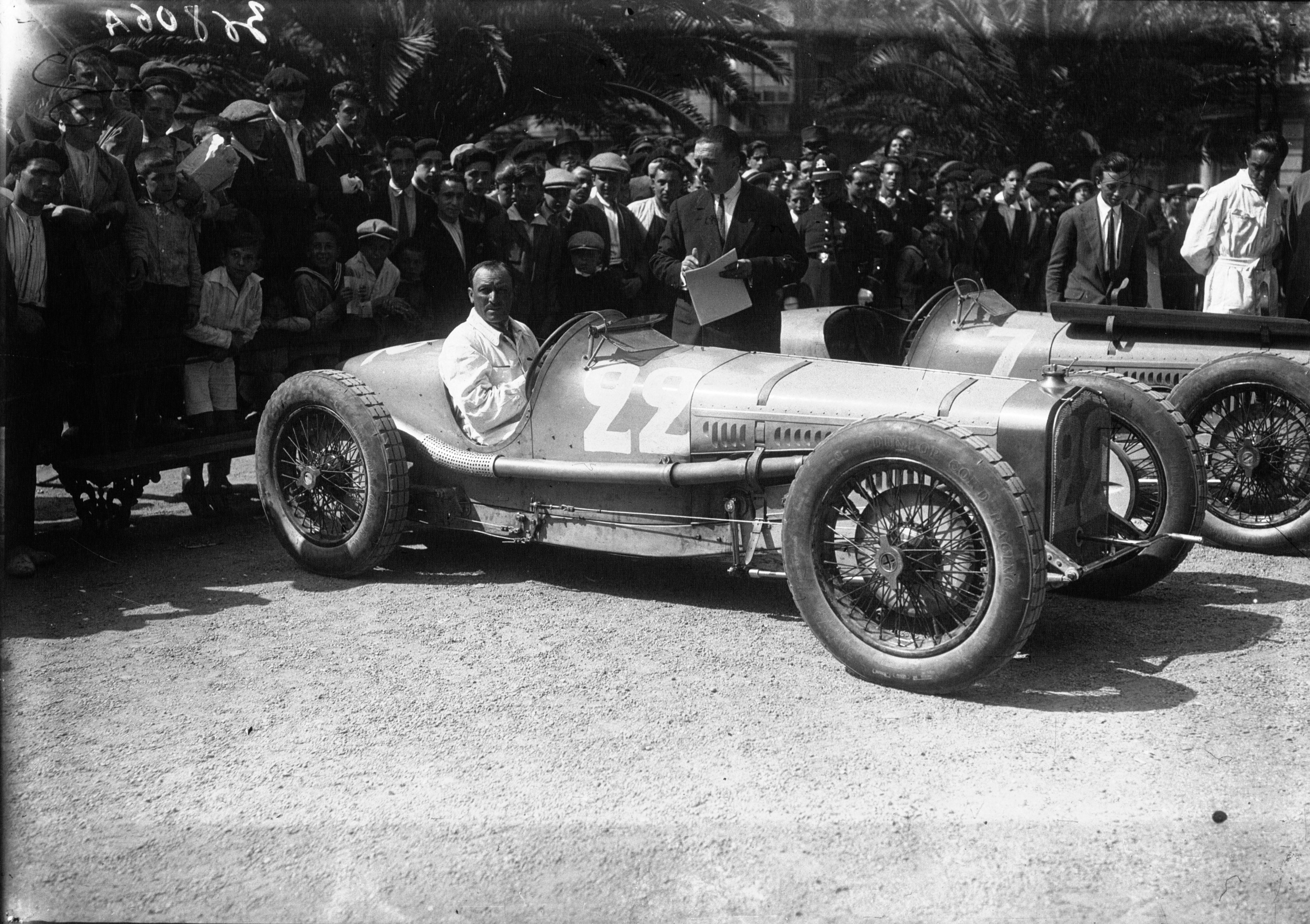
André Morel at the 1926 San Sebastián Grand Prix

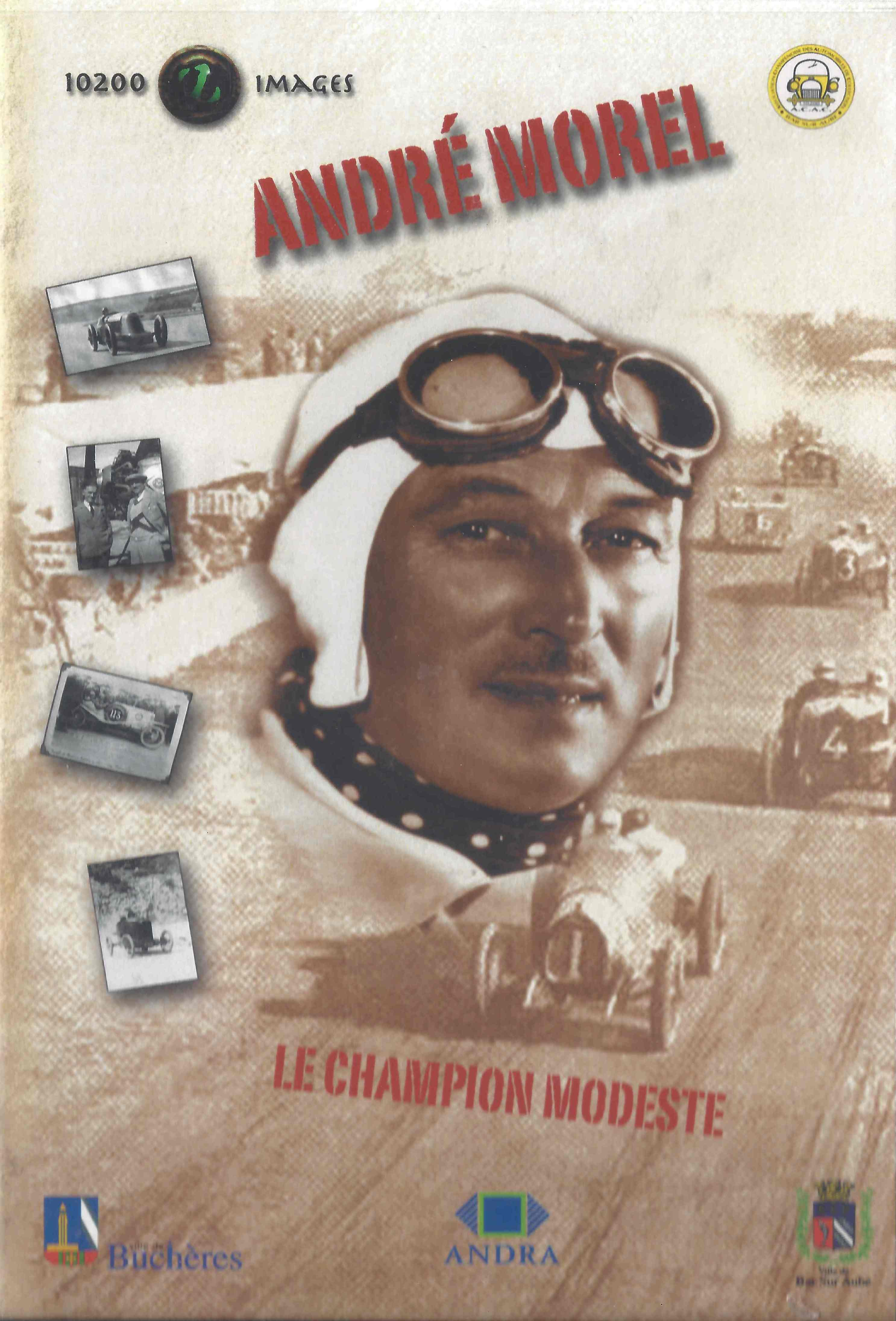
DVD Andre Morel Le Champion Modeste
