= Le Zèbre =

Former French car manufacturer

Le Zebre
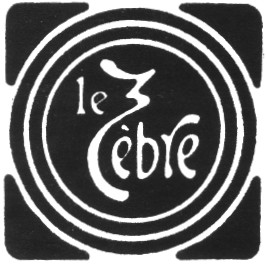
- Type: Private
- Industry: Automotive
- Founded: 1909
- Headquarters: Suresnes, France
- Key people: Jules Salomon, CEO and president
- Products: car

Le Zèbre was a French make of car built between 1909 and 1931 in Puteaux, and later Suresnes.

The company was founded by Jules Salomon and Georges Richard initially with finance from Jacques Bizet, son of composer Georges Bizet.

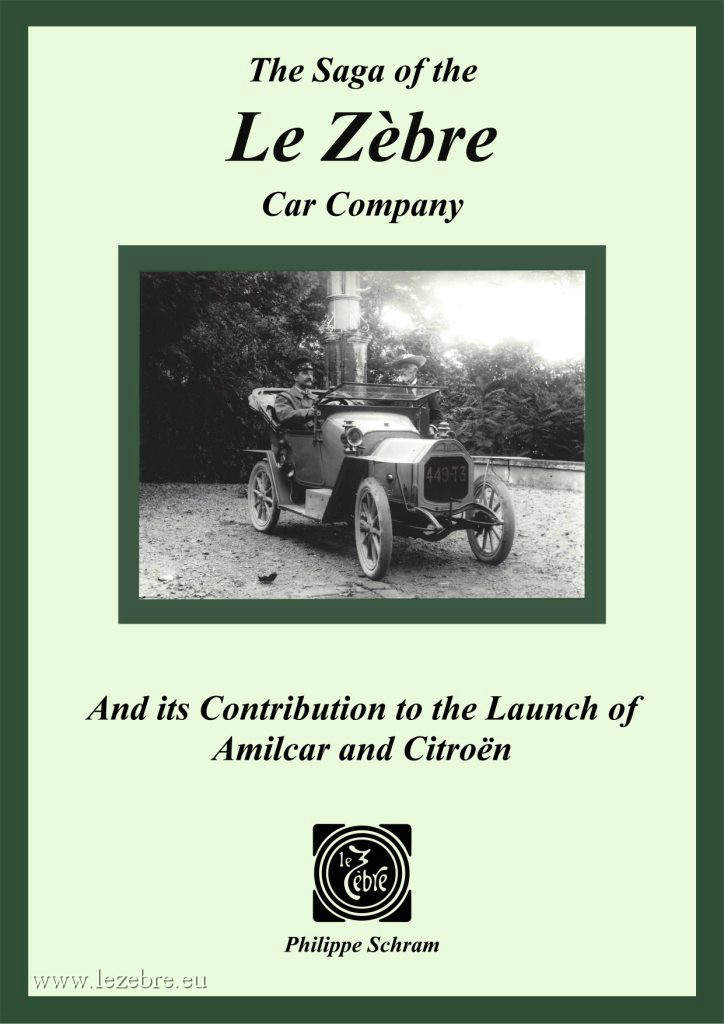
The front cover of the history of Le Zèbre

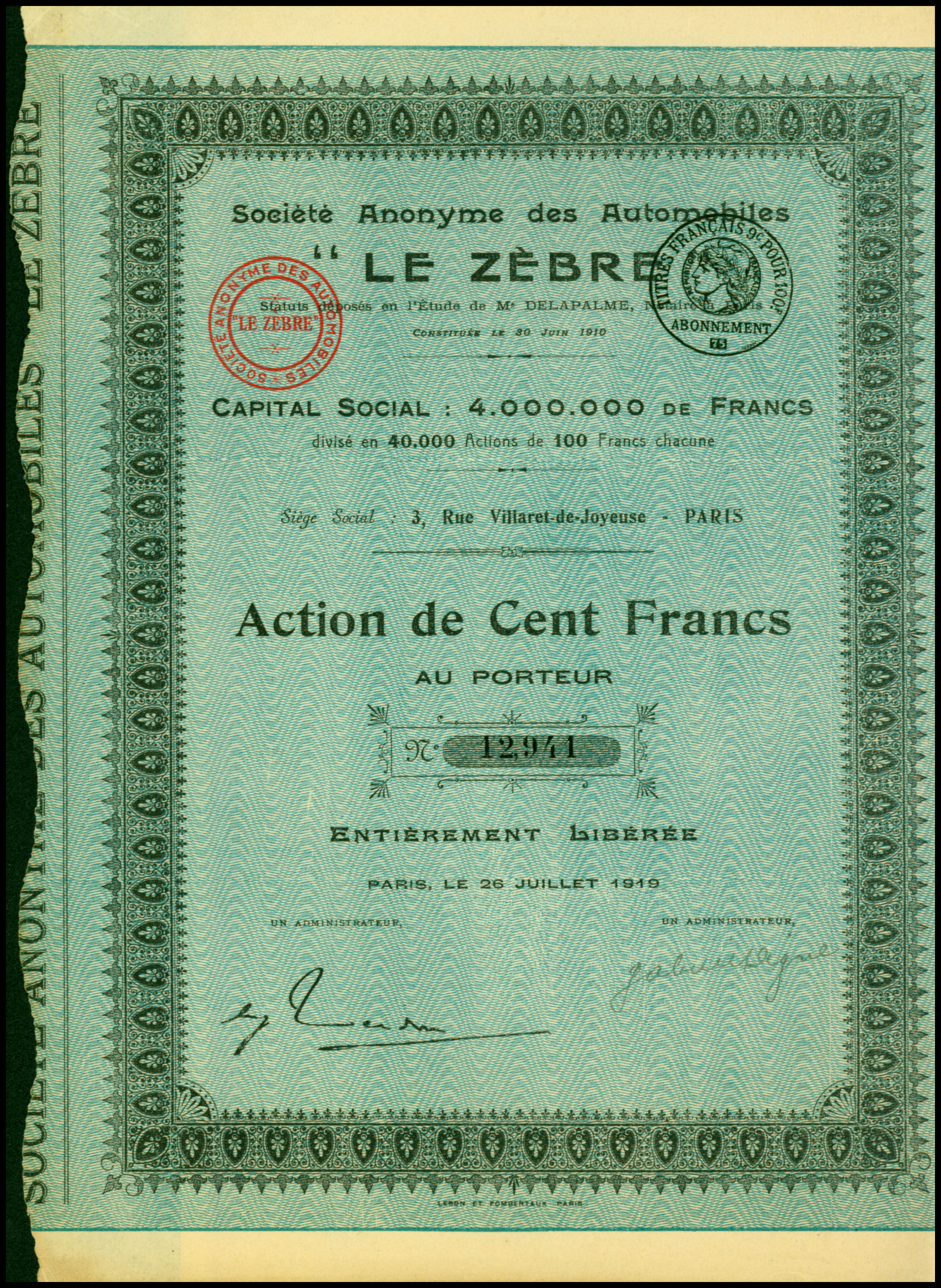
Share of the SA des Automobiles Le Zèbre, issued 26. July 1919

== History ==
Jules Salomon was a young graduate of the School of Commerce and Industry in Bordeaux, and began his career at Rouart Brothers who were engine makers. He later moved to Georges Richard where he met Jacques Bizet, who had the funds to back a new automotive brand and the ambition to leave a legacy to rival that of his father. The two friends decided not to give their names to the car, instead opting to call it "Le Zèbre" (The Zebra), which was originally a nickname given to a clerk of their former employer.

In 1909 Salomon developed his first car, a 600cc single-cylinder Cyclecar with two-speed and reverse gearbox and shaft drive, which was designated the Type A. This design was priced very aggressively, selling for 3,000 Francs, or 1,000 F less than competitors. The wheelbase was 180 cm (71 in) and the car weighed 300kg. The Type A was well received by the public, and attracted investment from influential businessmen Emile Akar and Joseph Lamy, which enabled factory relocation and expansion. Joseph Lamy assumed the function of Commercial Director. The success of the Type A was further assured by Baudry de Saunier, the greatest French automotive journalist of the time, who repeatedly extolled the car’s virtues.

In 1912 Le Zèbre announced their second model, the Type B. More imposing, it was a 1750cc four-cylinder, four-seater car, rated at 10CV and with a wheelbase of 260 cm (103 in). It sold for 6,000 F, which constituted another economic tour de force for the time.

The Type B was closely followed by the Type C, also a four-cylinder three-speed, but this time of 785cc, which was available only as a two-seat torpedo body on its 200 cm (80 in) wheelbase. All three models were produced from the company’s new factory in Suresnes. Le Zèbre became well known for their unique blend of robustness, reliability and low running costs.

On the outbreak of the First World War, the particularly light Le Zèbre cars turned out to be a “go-anywhere” vehicle and were selected for use as liaison vehicles by the French Army. From 1915, the Ministry of War placed an order for 40 cars per month, which allowed the company to retain the majority of its employees and avoid military requisition, unlike most other French car factories.

In 1917 the two founders split up. Jules Salomon left the company and met André Citroën, the then director general at Mors and was instrumental in the development of the first Citroen cars. Le Zèbre’s ownership structure was revised, with Jacques Bizet resigning his executive position, although retaining a commercial stake in the company.

From 1918, the new Type D was marketed. It had a four-cylinder engine of 998cc and four-speed gearbox, and was rated at 8CV. It was available in 3-seat torpedo, 4-seat sedan or saloon versions, with wheelbases between 250 cm (98 in) and 290 cm (114 in). With prices between 10,200 F and 16,500 F remained very affordable. In April 1919 André Morel joined the company as Sales Manager for the whole of the Southern France.

In 1921, Edmond Moyet (Chief Engineer), Morel, Akar and Lamy withdrew from the company to create a rival company, Amilcar. Le Zèbre struggled to cope with the loss of these key personnel and their associated capital, as well a good deal of their commercial network which Lamy and Akar were able to lure away to their new project.

With the Le Zèbre brand destabilized by the loss of key personnel, the original Type A reappeared, delivered with the Type C chassis and a slightly modified body. At the beginning of 1923, only Types A and D appeared in the catalogue, supplemented at the end of the year by the Type E, a sports version of the Type D. The pre-war Type C also reappeared, with sightly revised and improved bodywork.

It was not until the end of 1924 that a much more serious project saw the light of day, in the form of the Type Z. Entirely designed by the English engineer Harry Ricardo, known in the automotive world for his studies on combustion systems and the many associated patents he held, it had a 2-litre 10CV, four cylinder engine with aluminium pistons, hemispherical combustion chambers, and was priced from 24,000 F. The Le Zèbre-Ricardo partnership was warmly welcomed by the trade press, which hoped that the Suresnes company will be able to get out of its period of stagnation. From 1925 to 1930, it was the only car marketed by Le Zèbre but in the end only 550 Type Z’s were built. Faced with this new failure and the economic slump, the company closed permanently in 1931. Another collaboration with Ricardo featured a radical single-cylinder, opposed-piston, two-stroke, diesel-engine and was shown at the 1931 Paris Salon, but came too late to save the company.

Altogether, Le Zèbre produced 9,500 cars between 1909 and 1931, of which about 250 examples remain today.

== Bibliography ==
- The Saga of the Le Zèbre Car Company by Philip Schram.

== Gallery ==
Le Zèbre gallery

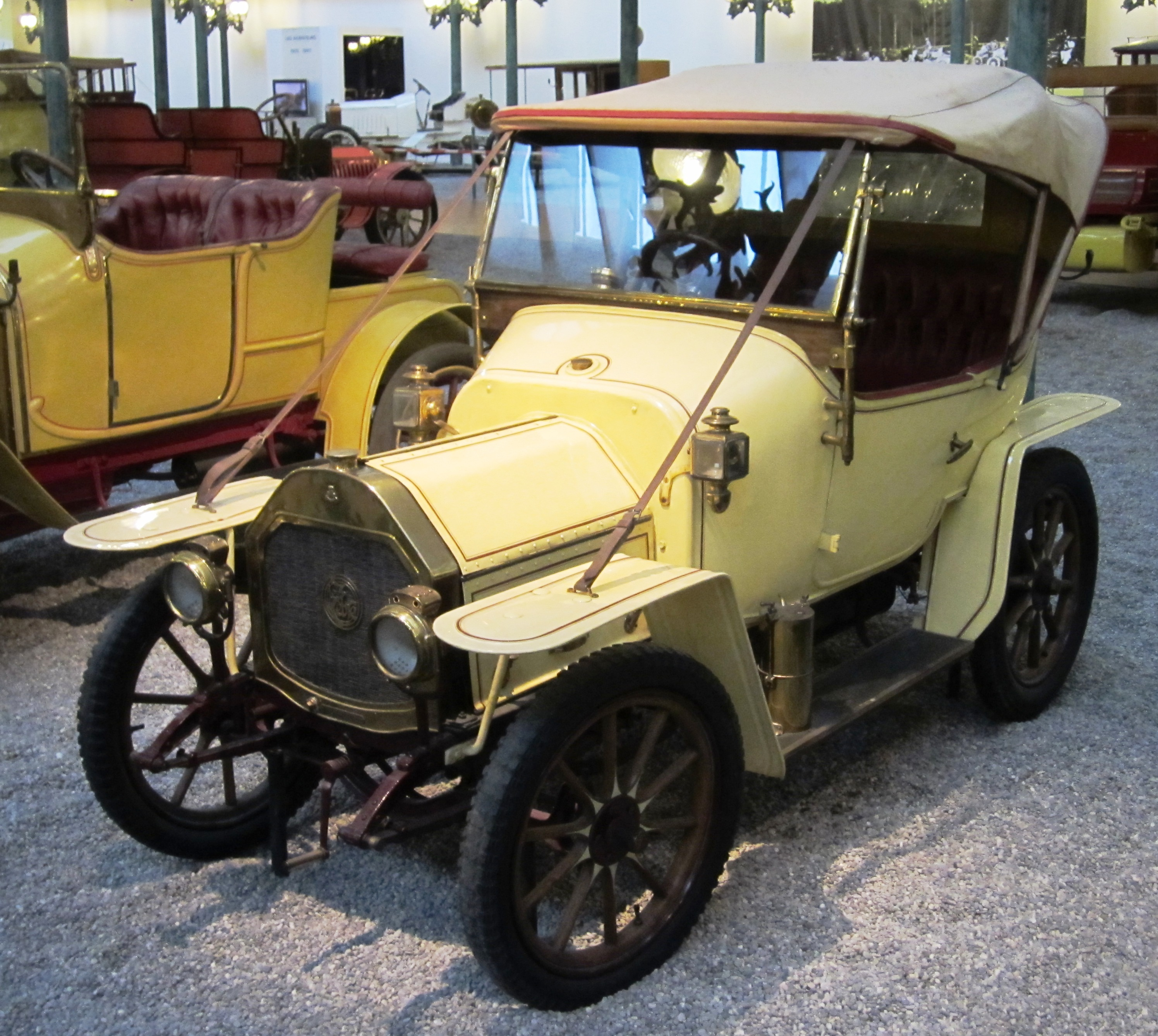
1913 Le Zèbre Type A

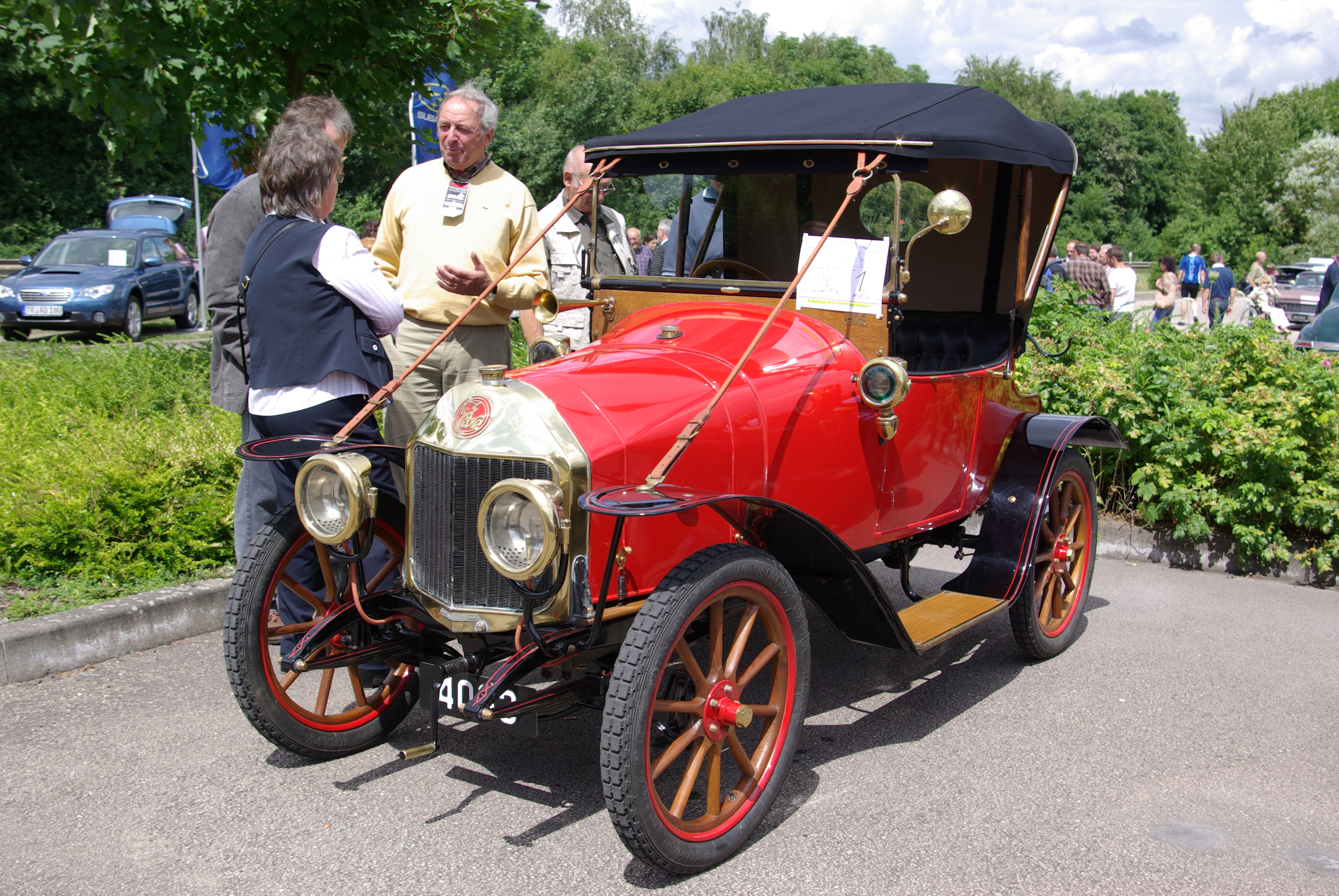
1913 Le Zèbre Type C

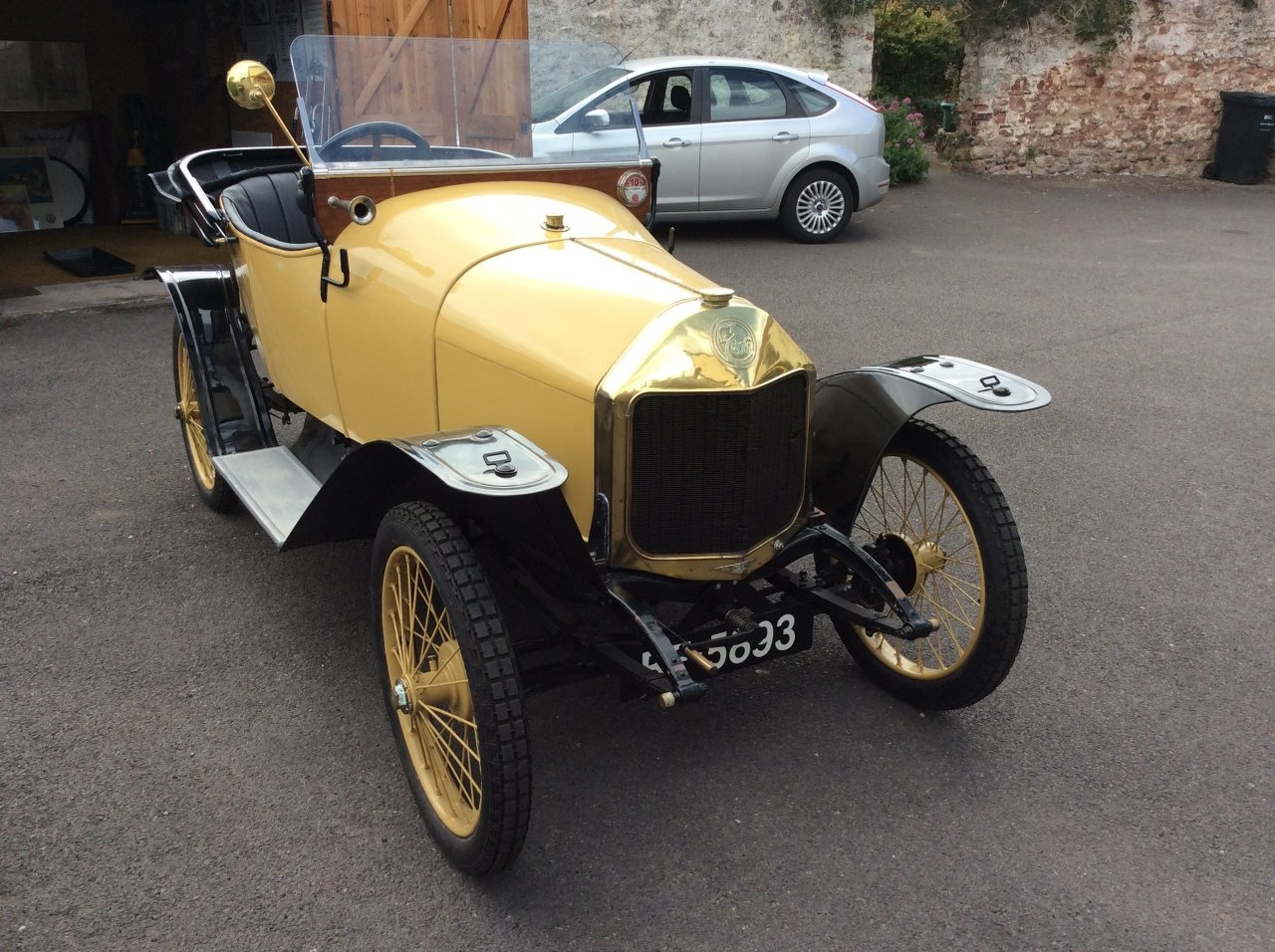
1914 Le Zèbre Type C

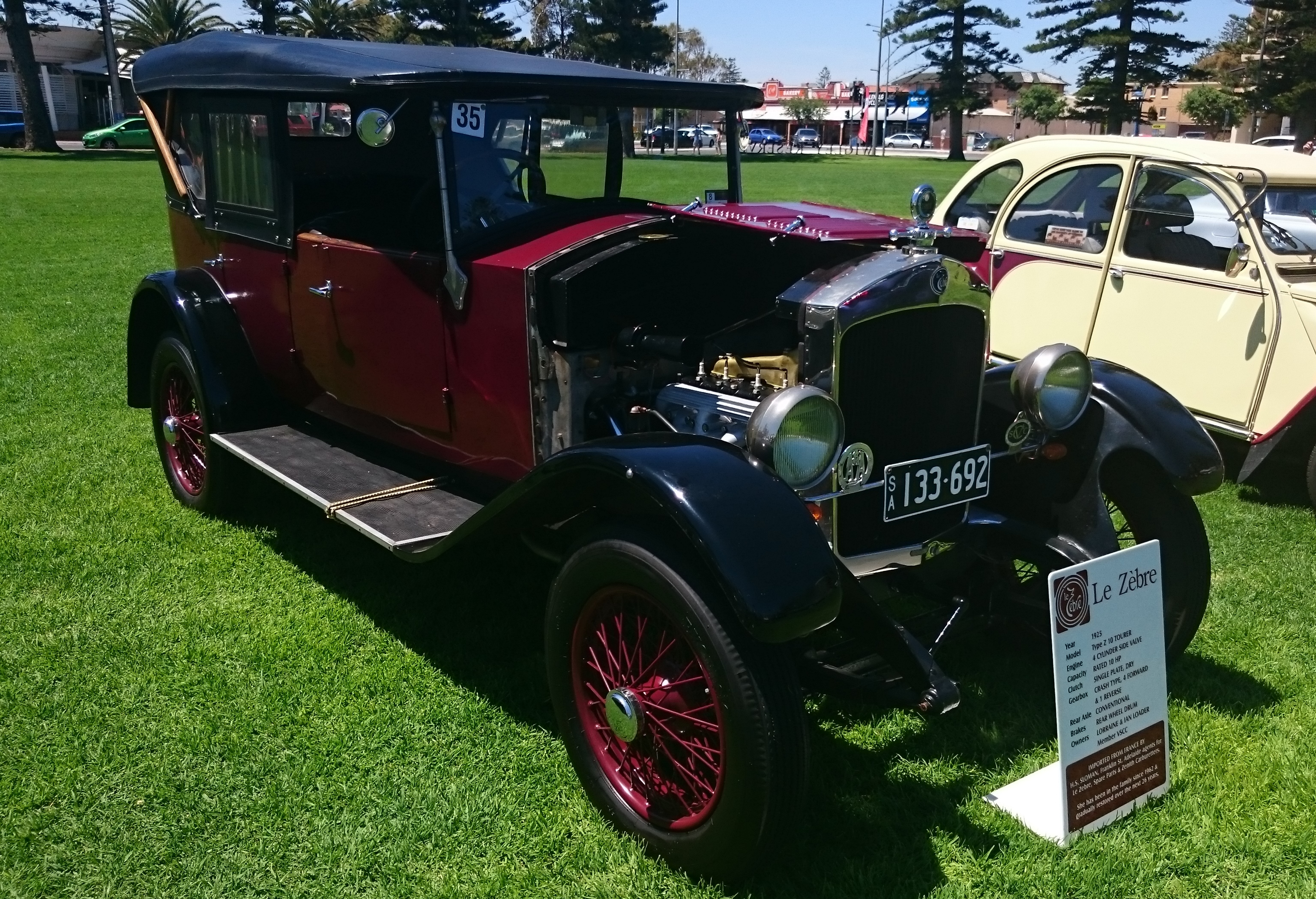
1925 Le Zèbre Type Z

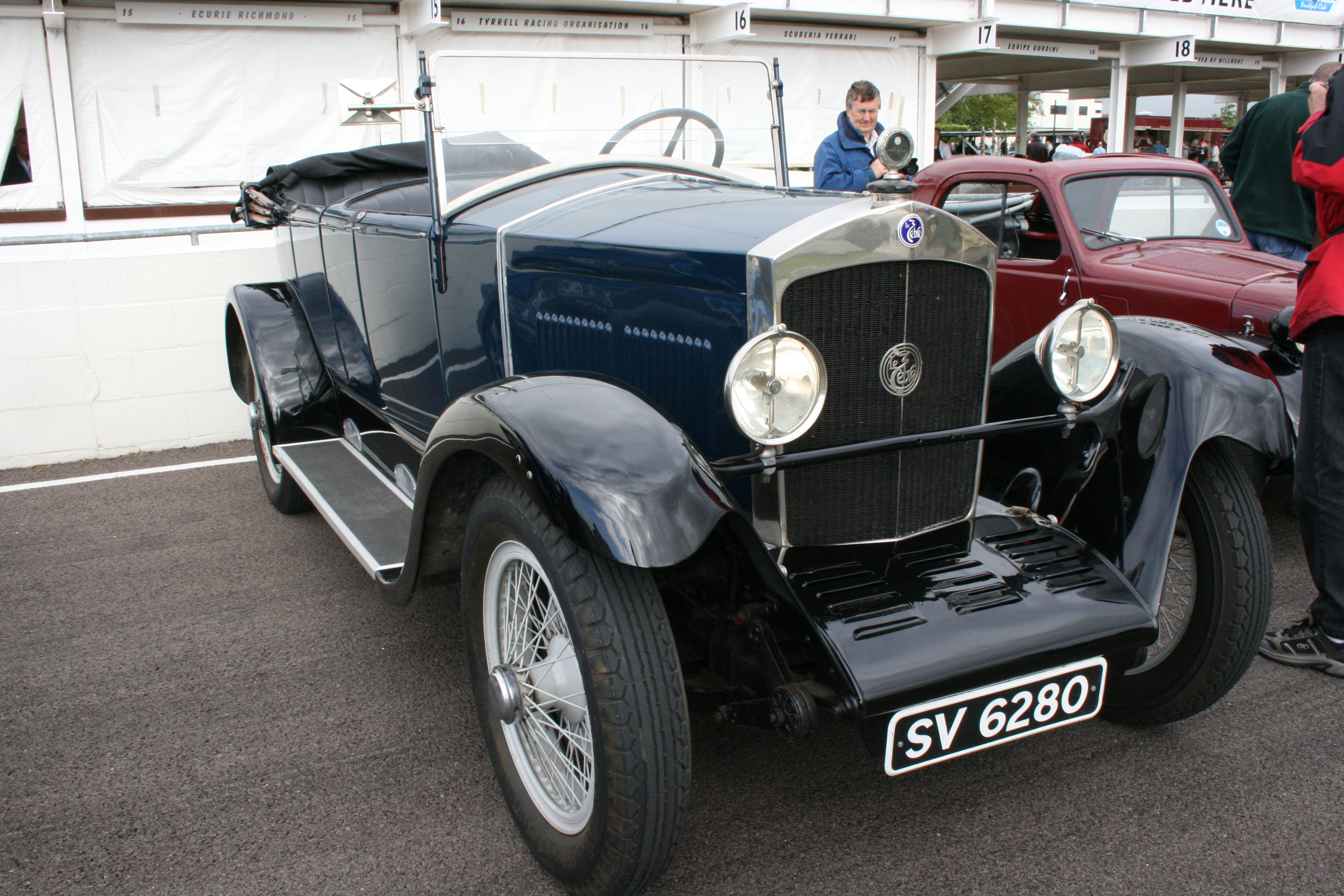
1926 Le Zèbre Type Z

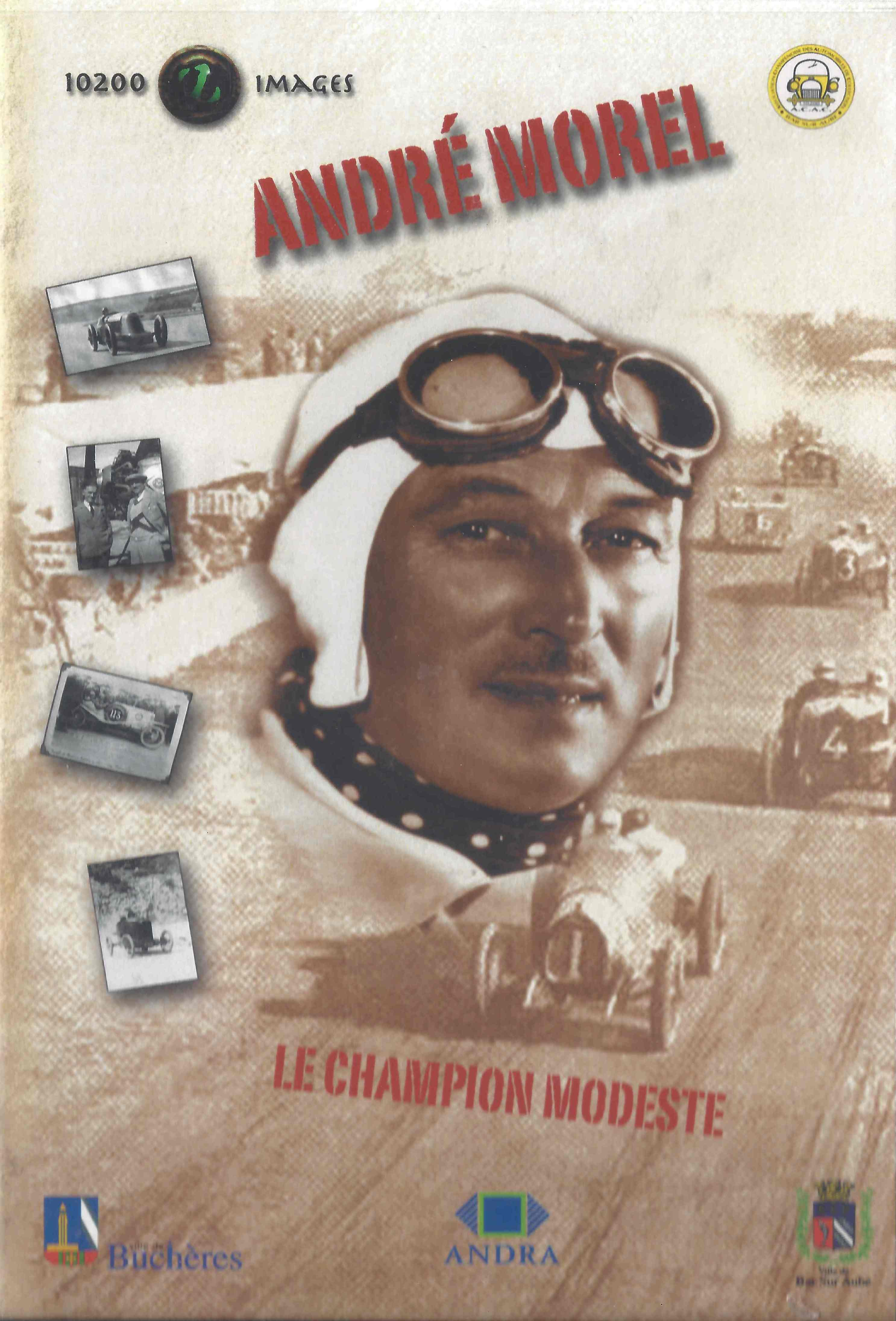
DVD Andre Morel Le Champion Modeste
