= Grofri =

Austrian vehicle brand

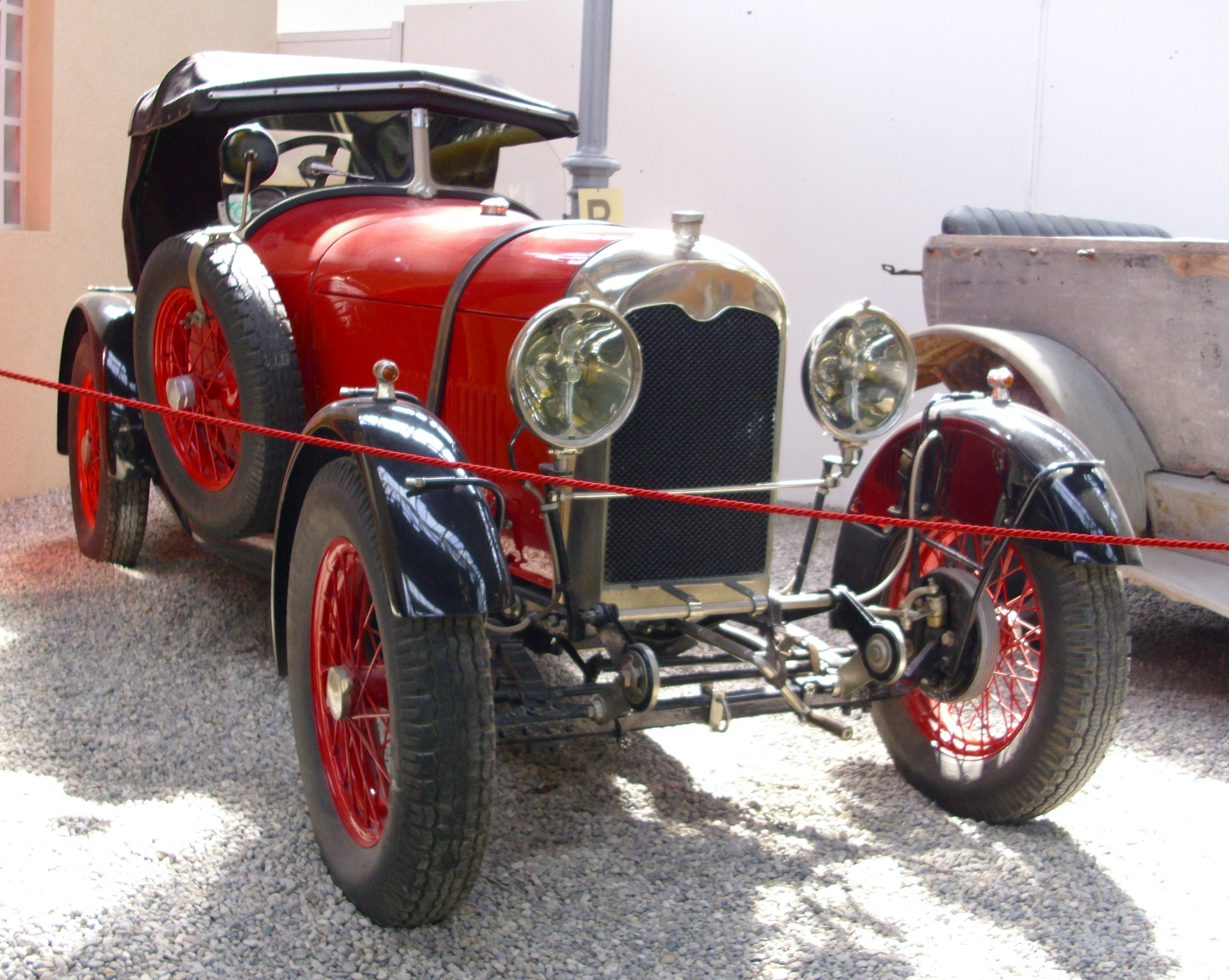
Grofri manufactured 1928

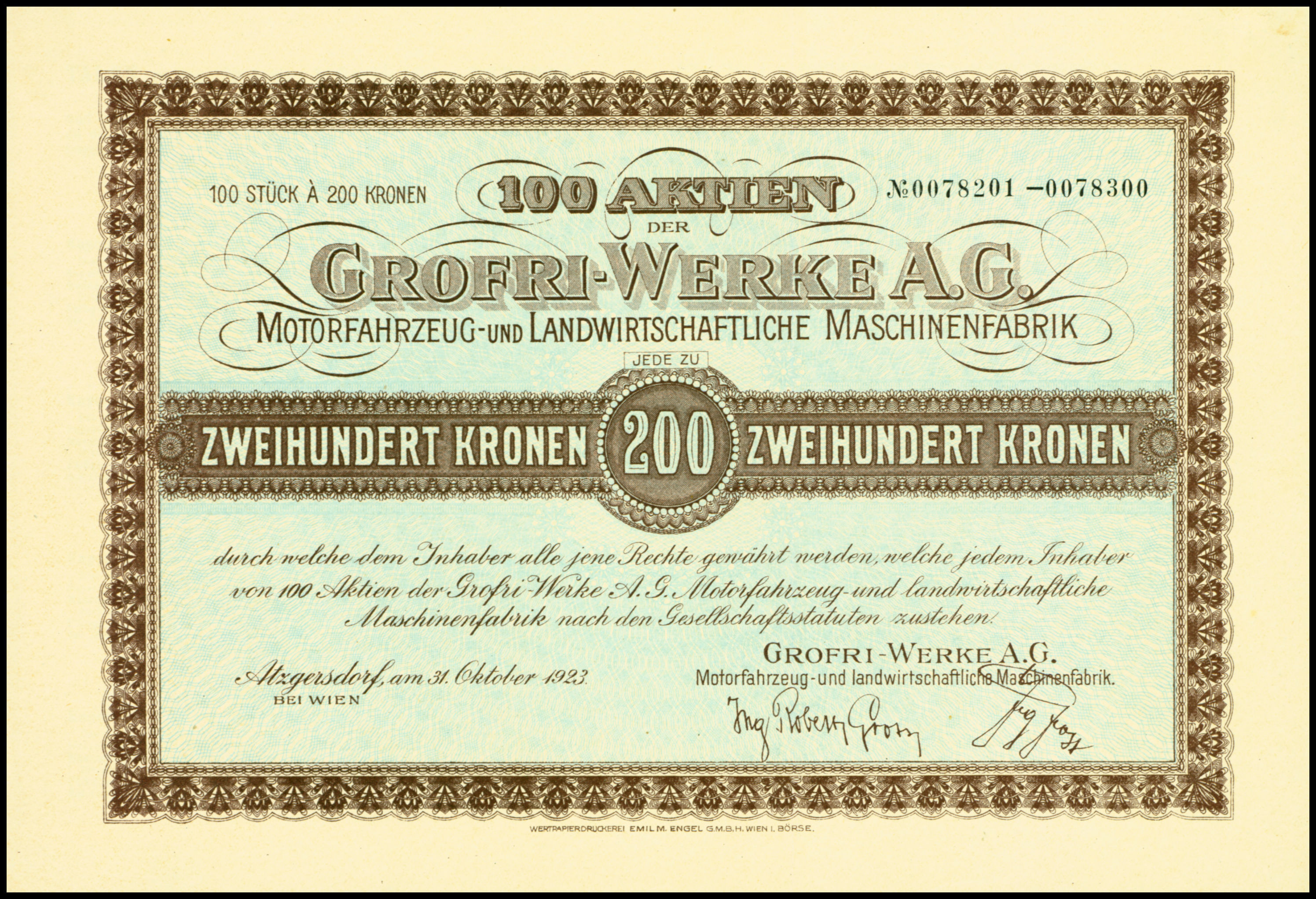
Share of the Grofri-Werke AG, issued 31. October 1923

Grofri was a brand of cars manufactured in Austria from 1921 to 1931 (1924 to 1927 under licence from the French Amilcar). SV 903 cc or 1074 cc four-cylinder engines were used in these sporting cyclecars. Racing versions were also made, some of them with Roots superchargers. The Gross & Friedmann house in Altzerdorf near Vienna manufactured these vehicles.

The racing cars were successful, particularly in hillclimbs. Successful race car driver Max Hoffmann (later known for introducing the United States to imports such as the Volkswagen, the Porsche 356, and the BMW) was selected as Grofri's factory driver. He continued racing until his final event, a 1936 hillclimb. Famous opera singer Käthe Rantzau also successfully ran a fast Grofri in hill races.
