= Amilcar C8 =

Overview
- Manufacturer: Amilcar
- Production: 1929–1931

Body and chassis
- Body style: saloon/sedan coupé cabriolet roadster

Powertrain
- Engine: 2330 cc (13CV) eight-cylinder
- Transmission: Four speed manual

Dimensions
- Wheelbase: 3,000 mm (120 in)

Chronology
- Successor: Amilcar Pégase

The Amilcar C8 is an eight-cylinder car in the 13CV car tax band made between 1929 and 1931 (and still listed in 1932) by the French Amilcar company. The car was normally sold in “bare chassis” form, giving rise to a wide range of possible body types, but coachwork appear usually to have been for two door sporting bodied cars. Approximately 350 were made.

== Origins ==
The C8 was the result of the manufacturer's wish, encouraged by the rising prosperity of the 1920s, to extend the Amilcar range upmarket. Amilcar had already built its reputation and market share with smaller cars, and the C8 was its first eight-cylinder model.

== Bodies ==
The usual range of body types could be fitted included sedans/saloons, coupés and cabriolets. The C8 was a substantial car, intended to compete against models such as the Delage DS and the Panhard & Levassor CS.

== Engine ==
The C8's straight-8 ohc engine had a capacity of 2330cc which placed it in the 13CV taxation class. Maximum power was quoted at 58 hp (43 kW), achieved at 4,000 rpm. The top speed will have depended on the weight and form of the body specified, but was quoted at 120 km/h (75 mph).

== Running gear ==
Power was delivered to the rear-wheels via a four speed manual gear box. The suspension used traditional leaf springs all round.

== Commercial ==
Having been conceived during a period of rising incomes, the C8 arrived in an over-supplied market place in a period of economic panic and stringency. The engine acquired a reputation for unreliability. The manufacturer fought to gain market share with ungraded models such as the ”C8 bis” and the “CS8”, but the car was not a commercial success. Amilcar abandoned the market segment, delisting the C8 towards the end of 1932. An indirect replacement appeared in 1934 with the presentation of the Pégase, which came with the option of a big four cylinder 2490cc (14CV) engine.
