= Jules Salomon =

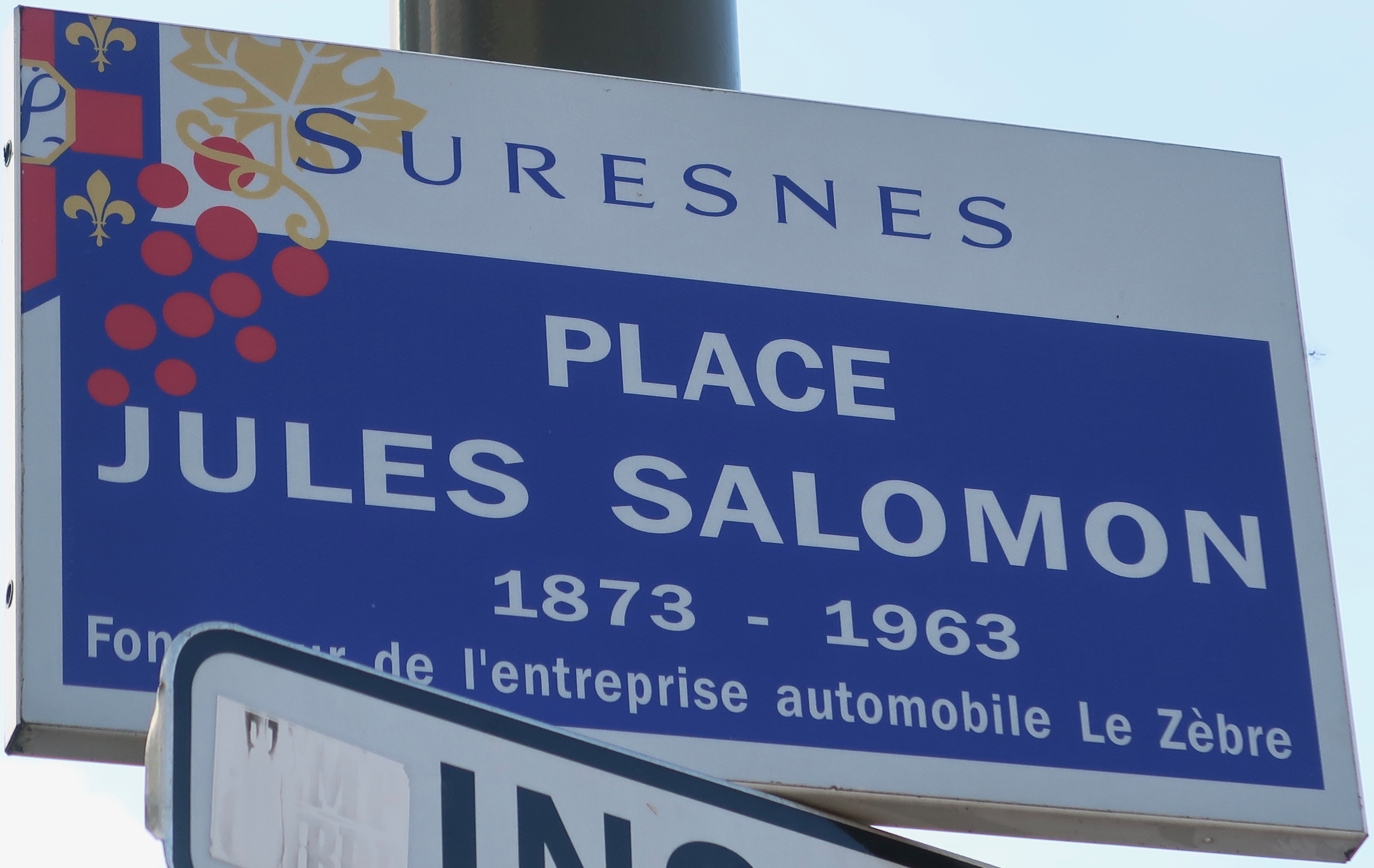
Street name on place Jules-Salomon in Suresnes.

Jean-Marie Jules Salomon (1 February 1873 - 31 December 1963) was a French industrialist. In 1909 he founded Le Zèbre, a car manufacturer.

== Life ==
Born in Cahors, he studied in Brive but failed the exam for the École nationale supérieure d'arts et métiers and so instead joined the École de commerce et d'industrie in Bordeaux. He was taken on as a draughtsman at Les Établissements Rouart in 1891 and became head of the drawing office at the Niel factories in Évreux in 1900. He began collaborating with the Unic factories in Puteaux in 1903 and there created a new type of car engine. He and Jacques Bizet then founded Le Zèbre in 1909.

He designed the four-seater Citroën B2 in 1920 and occasionally advised Peugeot on engineering from 1926 to 1928. From 1928 to 1939 he joined Automobiles L. Rosengart. He died at Suresnes and on 20 January 2025 was posthumously awarded a Grande Médaille by the Société des ingénieurs de l'automobile for his contribution to the French carmaking industry.

== Bibliography ==
- (in German) Die internationale Automobilenzyklopädie: 125 Jahre Marken und Modelle. USM. 2008. ISBN 978-3-8032-9876-8.
