= Amilcar Compound =

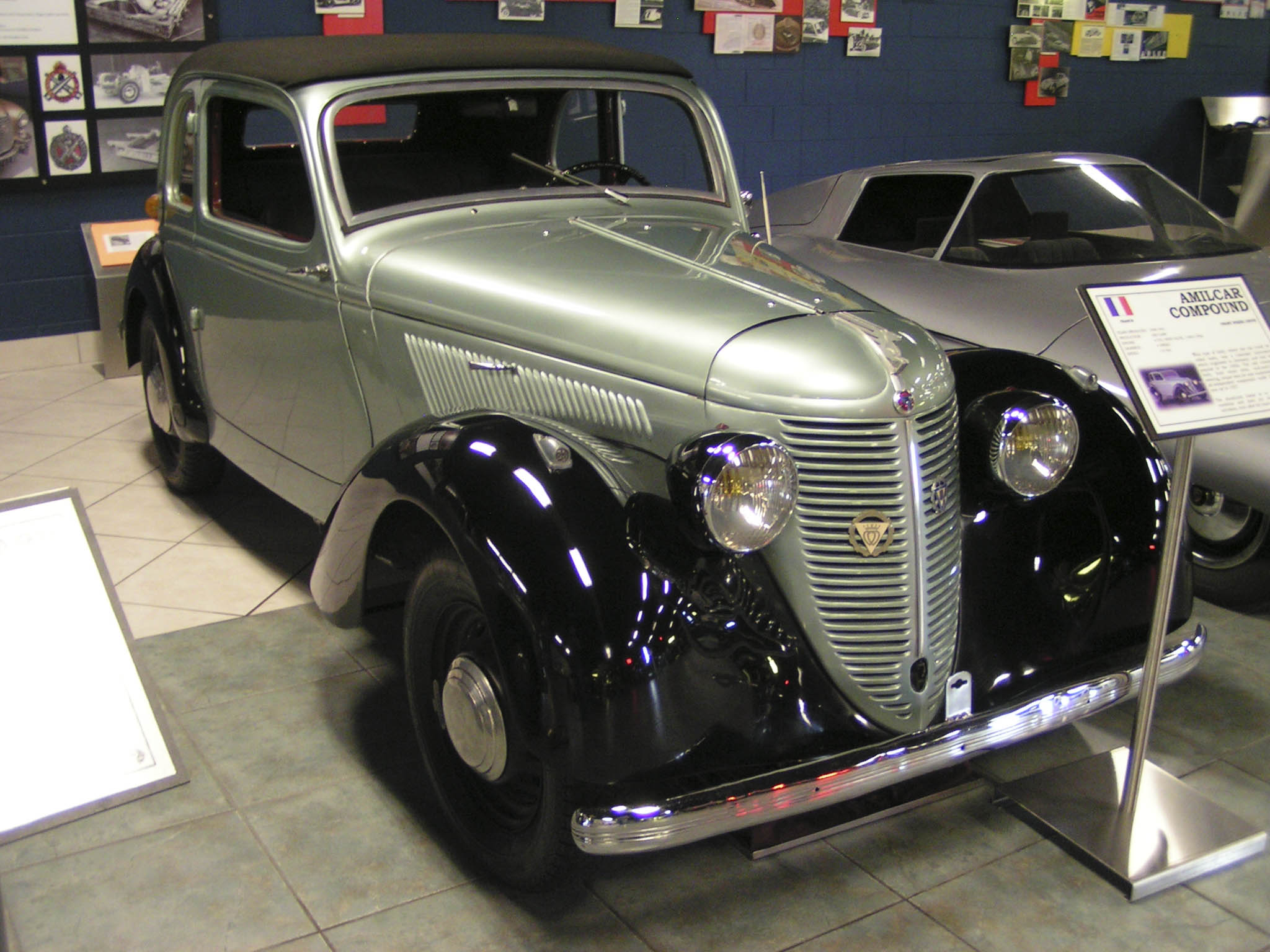

Overview
- Manufacturer: Amilcar
- Production: 1938–1943; 681 cars and 159 commercials made a few other unrecorded cars were probably also built

Body and chassis
- Body style: 2-door saloon 2-door convertible van and ambulance
- Layout: FF layout

Powertrain
- Engine: 1185 cc I4 side-valve (B38); 1340 cc I4 ohv (B67)

Dimensions
- Wheelbase: 2,500 mm (98.4 in).

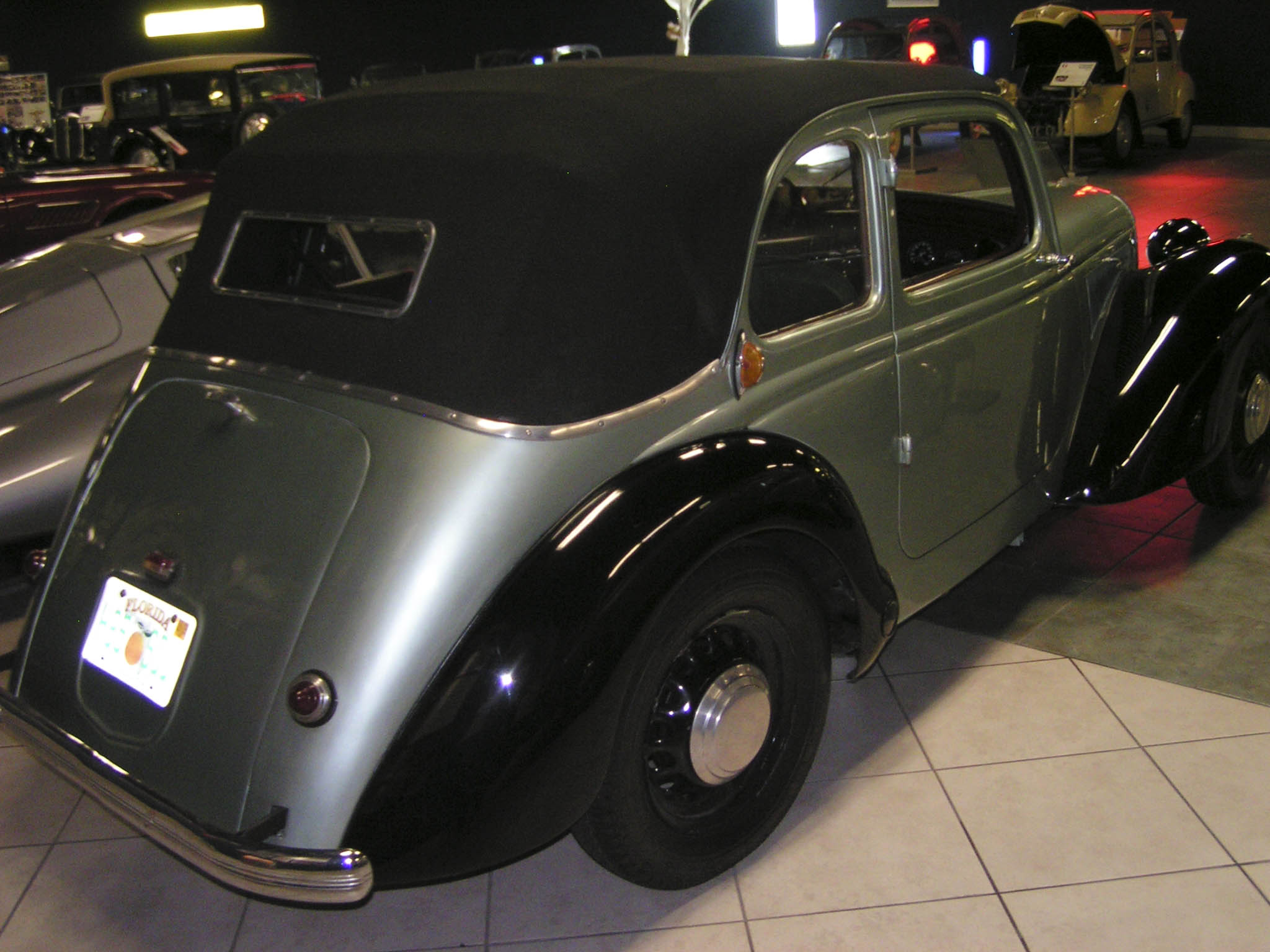
Convertible rear view

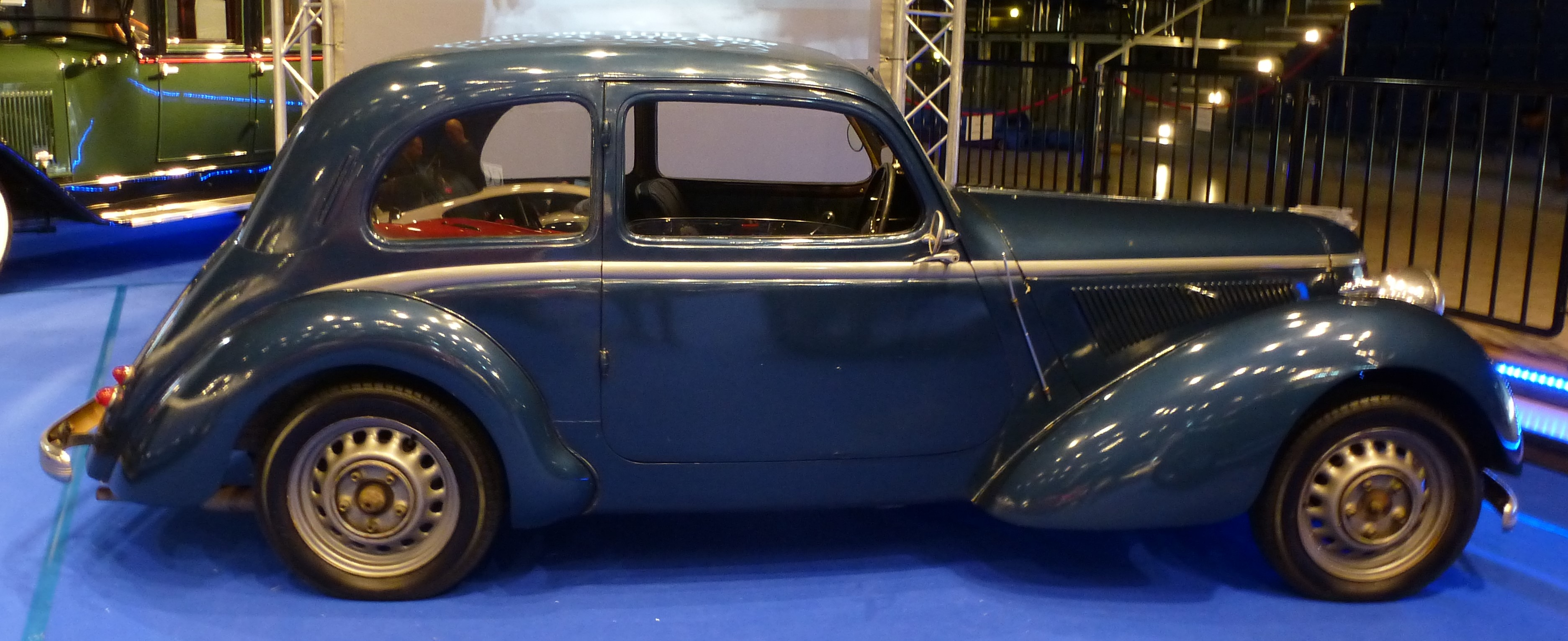
Compound B 38 Limousine 1939 Side View

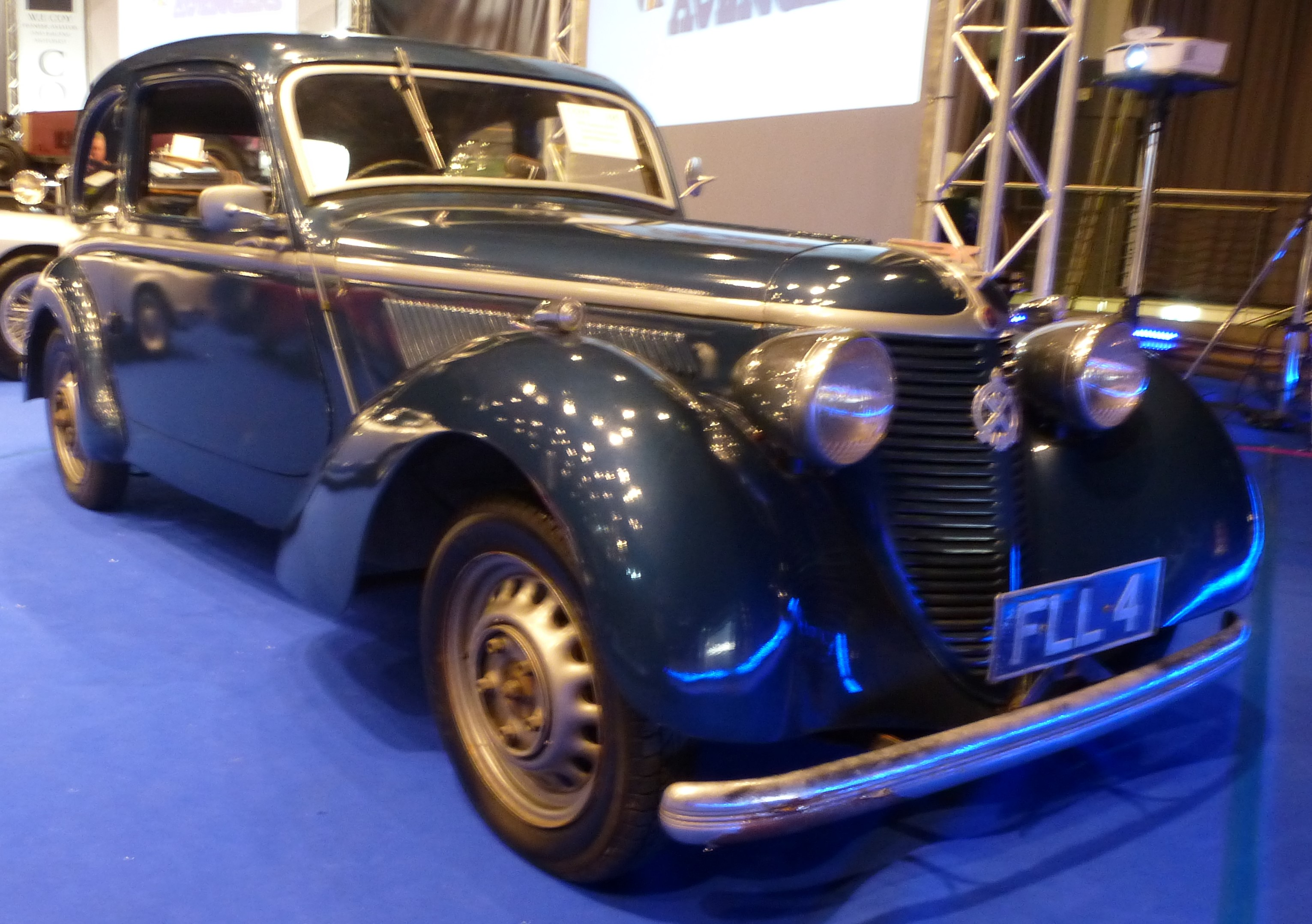
Compound B 38 Limousine 1939 Front/Side View

The Amilcar Compound is a front wheel drive car with unitary body/chassis introduced shortly before World War II by Amilcar after their takeover by Hotchkiss. It was designed by the famous French engineer Jean-Albert Grégoire.

== Slow start ==
The first Compound, the Compound B38, was presented at the 1937 Paris Motor Show, but production was delayed by difficulties involving the car's light metal panels, which still represented a very new technology. Series production only got underway a year later. Nevertheless, 35 of the cars were produced during the final quarter of 1938, and through 1939 production built up progressively, with 576 Compounds produced that year. A further 64 were produced during the early months of 1940: however France, along with Britain, had declared war on Germany in September 1939. War affected the French auto-industry during the ensuing months, as first the Paris Motor Show, scheduled for October 1939, was cancelled and then, in June 1940 the German Army invaded and occupied the northern half of the country.

== Engine and running gear ==
The four cylinder, side valve, 1185 cc engine had its all synchromesh equipped, four speed, gearbox mounted in front of it with gear selection via cables. The drive was transmitted to the front wheels via short shafts and constant velocity joints. The steering used a rack and pinion mechanism. Suspension was independent all round using torsion bars at the rear.

The car's technical design, including but not restricted to the light-metal technology, was supplied by a brilliant and charismatic engineer called Jean-Albert Grégoire. By the time of the German invasion an upgraded Compound had been prepared by Grégoire, an energetic exponent of front wheel drive and of the use of aluminium in automobile construction, and a man whose designs found their way into the ranges of several automakers in the 1930s and 1940s. The improved Compound, known as the Compound B67, was intended primarily to address the perceived performance limitations of the original model, and this was achieved by adding 4 mm to the cylinder bores, thereby increasing engine capacity from 1185 cc to 1340 cc. Increasing the cylinder diameter made it practical at the same time to replace the side-valve lay-out with overhead valves. Claimed top speed was increased from 110 km/h (68 mph) to 115 km/h (71 mph). Several pre-production Compound B67s were running during the summer of 1939, and it appears that the manufacturer planned to launch it in October 1939 at the Paris Motor Show. By the time the event was cancelled it appears that about five Compound B67s had been produced in the Amilcar section of the Hotchkiss factory.

== Wartime adaptation ==
Wartime records may not be complete, but it is apparent that the car's front wheel drive layout made it particularly suitable for adaptation to different body types. Between the summer of 1942 and spring 1943 Hotchkiss was able to produce 149 Compound based estate cars, of which 50 were delivered to the postal service, 50 found civilian customers, and 49 were delivered to the French Red Cross who adapted them for use as ambulances.

The 149 estate cars delivered between 1942 and 1943 all used the smaller older engine and other mechanical elements from the B38. However, a small number of B67 engined Compounds were also produced during the war years. These featured a simplified but more robust three speed gear box in place of the four speed unit that had come with the B38 Compound, along with a suitably strengthened clutch.

The manufacturer also produced a few B67 engines that were shipped to Laffly who installed them in some prototypes for their V10R all-terrain vehicle. After the war, as it became clear that the government would block the company's plans to resume Compound production, the remaining stock of B67 engines was sold, along with the tooling necessary for their production, to Impéria who used them for a production run of about 1,000 of their own front wheel drive TA8 models.

== Bodywork ==
The Compound B38 made extensive use of Alpax, an aluminium alloy, to make castings that were assembled into a frame onto which steel sheet metal pressings were bolted and welded. In this respect the car played a pioneering role in light metal technologies that would be taken on by the automotive and airplane industries, although the rising cost of aluminium would reduce its attractions as a mainstream element in car bodies in the later 1950s.

Between 1938 and 1940 it seems that almost all Compounds came with saloon/sedan bodies, although there was also mention of a cabriolet.

Drawings came to light in 1946 for a four-door “woody” style estate version with a lengthened chassis, thought to have been penned in 1937 by Clément Vinciguerra, who at that time was in charge of the company's design and development department. A prototype was due to be built and would have become Vinciguerra's personal transport, but there is no trace of this unique vehicle ever having been constructed. There was also, in 1946, a proposal for a simpler three door estate version, but by this time it was becoming increasingly clear that the Amilcar Compound's post-war renaissance was not part of the agenda of Charles de Gaulle’s highly interventionist government.

== Post-war planning ==
There seems to have been some overlap of responsibilities regarding the Amilcar Compound’s development between Jean-Albert Grégoire and Clément Vinciguerra. In any event, after 1940 Grégoire was increasingly preoccupied by other projects, notably one with Simca for the production of a light metal car. It was the company man Clément Vinciguerra at Hotchkiss who took the project forward. Anticipating that peace would at some stage break out, by 1941 Clément Vinciguerra had designed a new version of the Compound to take the B67 engine and transmission package. The design was similar to that of the existing car, but featured innovative touches such as an Americanized slatted front grille. Under the skin more dramatic changes were foreseen. Mindful of the materials shortages and technological restrictions that might accompany its production, the design for this car, known as “Project 704” had a greatly reduced dependency on exotic materials, and featured a traditional separate chassis. The design drawings progressed to the construction of a prototype which would be used as a private car and survived well after the war. This car clocked up more than 200,000 kilometres (120,000 mi) before being scrapped. Unfortunately no one photographed it, however.

After the war Hotchkiss was not one of the automakers most favoured by the Pons Plan. The Pons Plan reflected government determination to structure the French auto-industry according to priorities identified by politicians and civil servants: exclusion or any departure from it created great difficulties in obtaining necessary permissions and materials. Government strategy did not wholly exclude Hotchkiss from auto-making, but it did pigeon hole the company's auto-making activities: these were to be restricted to those of a niche (probably luxury car) manufacturer focused on export sales. The Amilcar Compound did not fit into that definition, and plans to relaunch the car after the war therefore could not be implemented.

== Britain ==
The car was sold on the British market as the Hotchkiss Ten.
