= Amilcar CC =

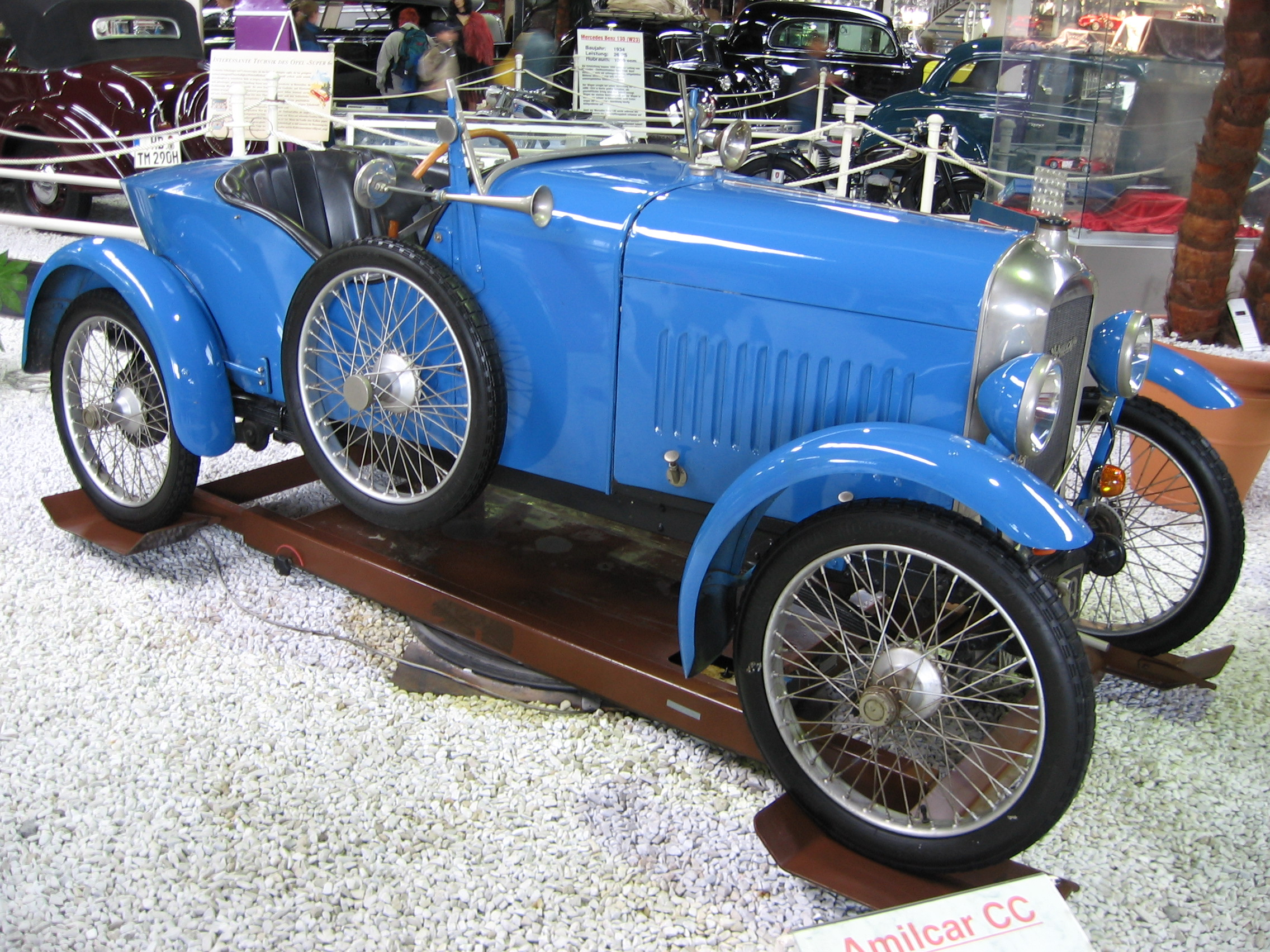
- Amilcar CC 1921

Overview
- Manufacturer: Amilcar
- Production: 1922–1925

Body and chassis
- Class: Roadster

Powertrain
- Engine: 903 cc four-cylinder
- Transmission: Three-speed manual

Dimensions
- Length: 130 in (3,300 mm)
- Curb weight: 350 kg

The Amilcar CC was a light sporting car produced by the French Amilcar company from 1922 to 1925. It was powered by a 903 cc four-cylinder, side-valve engine generating 18 bhp.
