= Core =

Core or cores may refer to:

== Science and technology ==
- Core (anatomy), everything except the appendages
- Core (laboratory), a highly specialized shared research resource
- Core (manufacturing), used in casting and molding
- Core (optical fiber), the signal-carrying portion of an optical fiber
- Core, the central part of a fruit
- Hydrophobic core, the interior zone of a protein
- Nuclear reactor core, a portion containing the fuel components
- Pit (nuclear weapon) or core, the fissile material in a nuclear weapon
- Semiconductor intellectual property core (IP core), is a unit of design in ASIC/FPGA electronics and IC manufacturing
- Atomic core, an atom with no valence electrons
- Lithic core, in archaeology, a stone artifact left over from toolmaking

=== Geology and astrophysics ===
- Core sample, in Earth science, a sample obtained by coring
  - Ice core
- Core, the central part of a galaxy; see Mass deficit
- Core (anticline), the central part of an anticline or syncline
- Planetary core, the center of a planet
  - Earth's inner core
  - Earth's outer core
- Stellar core, the region of a star where nuclear fusion takes place
  - Solar core

=== Computing ===
- Core Animation, a data visualization API used in macOS
- Core dump, the recorded state of a running program
- Intel Core, a family of single-core and multi-core 32-bit and 64-bit CPUs released by Intel
- Magnetic core, in electricity and electronics, ferromagnetic material around which wires are wound
  - Magnetic-core memory, the primary memory technology used before semiconductor memory
- Central processing unit (CPU), called a core
  - Multi-core processor, a microprocessor with multiple CPUs on one integrated circuit chip
- Server Core, a minimalist Microsoft Windows Server installation option

=== Mathematics ===
- Core (game theory), the collection of stable allocations that no coalition can improve upon
- Core (graph theory), the homomorphically minimal subgraph of a graph
- Core (group theory), an object in group theory
- Core of a triangulated category
- Core, an essential domain of a closed operator; see Unbounded operator
- Core, a radial kernel of a subset of a vector space; see Algebraic interior

== Arts, entertainment and media ==
- Core (novel), a 1993 science fiction novel by Paul Preuss
- Core (radio station), a defunct digital radio station in the United Kingdom
- 90.3 The Core RLC-WVPH, a radio station in Piscataway, New Jersey, US
- C.O.R.E. (video game), a 2009 NDS game
- Core (video game), a video game with integrated game creation system
- Core (DC Comics), a fictional character from DC Comics
- The Core (Amphibia), a fictional character from the Amphibia TV series.
- "CORE", an area in the Underground in the video game Undertale
- "The Core", an episode of The Transformers cartoon
- -core, a suffix used to refer to internet aesthetics, styles, and trends

=== Film and television ===
- Cores (film), a 2012 film
- The Core, a 2003 science fiction film
- The Core, the 2000–2002 name for the programming block on Five currently known as Shake!

=== Music ===
- Core (album), by Stone Temple Pilots, 1992
- Core (band), an American stoner rock band
- Core, a 2006 album by Persefone
- "Core", a song by Susumu Hirasawa from Paranoia Agent Original Soundtrack
- "The Core" (song), a song from Eric Clapton's 1977 album Slowhand
- The Core (XG album), a 2026 album by XG
- "CORE", a track from the soundtrack of the 2015 video game Undertale by Toby Fox

== Organizations ==
- Core International, a defunct American computer and technology corporation
- Core Design, a videogame developer best known for the Tomb Raider series
- Coordenadoria de Recursos Especiais, Brazilian state police SWAT team
- Digestive Disorders Foundation, working name Core
- Center for Operations Research and Econometrics at the Université catholique de Louvain in Belgium
- Central Organisation for Railway Electrification, an organization in India
- China Open Resources for Education, an OpenCourseWare organization in China
- Community Organized Relief Effort, a non-profit organization providing humanitarian relief
- Congress of Racial Equality, United States civil rights organization
- CORE (research service), a UK-based aggregator of open access content
- C.O.R.E. Digital Pictures, a computer animation studio
- CORE System Trust, see CORE-OM

== Places ==
=== United States ===
- Core, San Diego, a neighborhood in California
- Core, West Virginia
- Core Banks, North Carolina
- Core Sound, North Carolina

=== Other places ===
- Corés, a parish in Spain
- The Core Shopping Centre (Calgary), Alberta, Canada
- The Core, a shopping centre in Leeds, England, on the site of Schofields

== People ==
- Earl Lemley Core (1902–1984), West Virginia botanist
- Ericson Core, American director and cinematographer
- Leopoldine Core, American poet and short story writer

== Other uses ==
- Core (architecture)
- Co-ordinated On-line Record of Electors, central database in the United Kingdom
- Coree or Cores, a Native American tribe
- Korah, a biblical figure
- Leadership core, concept in Chinese politics
- Persephone, a Greek goddess also known as Kore or Cora (Greek κόρη = daughter)
- Core countries, in dependency theory, an industrialized country on which peripheral countries depend
- Core curriculum, in education, an essential part of the curriculum
- CORE (Clinical Outcomes in Routine Use) System, see CORE-OM

== See also ==
- CORE (disambiguation)
- Corre (disambiguation)
- Corps (disambiguation)
- Corium (disambiguation)
- Kernel (disambiguation)
- Nucleus (disambiguation)
