= Corre (surname) =

Corre, Corré or Le Corre is a surname. Notable people with the surname include:

== Corre/Corré ==
- Corentin Corre, French cyclist
- Jean-Claude Corre (born 1961), French race walker
- Jean-Marie Corre (1864–1915), French bicycle and automobile manufacturer
- Joseph Corré (born 1967), British businessman
- Sadie Corré (1918–2009), English actress, tap dancer and comic performer

== Le Corre ==
- Erwan Le Corre (born 1971), French exercise instructor
- Pascal Le Corre (born 1959), French pianist, teacher and author
- Pierre Le Corre (born 1990), French triathlete
- Raymond Le Corre (1933–2014), French military general
- René Le Corre (1923–2021), French poet
- Yvon Le Corre (1939–2020), French painter, educator and navigator
