= Corps (disambiguation) =

A corps is a large military unit usually composed of two or more divisions.

Corps may also refer to:

== Places ==
- Corps, Isère, a commune in the department of Isère in France
- Corps de Garde, a mountain in the Moka Range in Mauritius

== Military ==
- Air Training Corps, UK or New Zealand Air Cadets
- Corps des Sapeurs-Pompiers, a military force in Monaco composed mainly of officers from French military or fire services
- United States Marine Corps, a branch of the United States Armed Forces responsible for providing power projection from the sea

== Civic organizations ==
- AmeriCorps, a program of the U.S. federal government engaging adults in intensive community service
- Civilian Conservation Corps (CCC), a public work relief program that operated from 1933 to 1942 in the United States
- Diplomatic corps, the collective body of foreign diplomats accredited to a particular country or body
- Job Corps, a program of the United States Department of Labor that offers education and vocational training
- Mercy Corps, a global aid agency engaged in transitional environments that have experienced some sort of shock
- National Association of Service and Conservation Corps (NASCC), an association of Service and Conservation Corps in the United States
- Peace Corps, a volunteer program run by the United States government
- Senior Corps, a United States government agency to provide aid to senior citizens
- Youth Conservation Corps, a summer work youth program in U.S. federally managed lands

== Other uses ==
- Ambulance corps, an emergency service dedicated to providing out-of-hospital acute medical care* Corps (church), a place of worship in The Salvation Army
- CORPS (Complete Omniversal Role Playing System), a generic role-playing game system
- Corps de ballet, the group of dancers who are not soloists
- Drum and bugle corps (classic), musical ensembles that descended from military bugle and drum units returning from World War I and succeeding wars
- Drum and bugle corps (modern), a musical marching unit
- German Student Corps, Germany's traditional university corporations or fraternities
  - Corps Altsachsen Dresden, a German Student Corps in the Weinheimer SC-Verband
  - Corps Hubertia Freiburg, one of the oldest German Student Corps in the Kösener SC-Verband with strong Hunting tradition
  - Corps Vandalia-Teutonia, a German Student Corps in the Kösener SC-Verband
- Green Lantern Corps, a fictional intergalactic military/police force appearing in comics published by DC Comics
- Press corps, a group of reporters covering a specific entity or event
- An abbreviation of Corporation

== See also ==
- Corpse, a dead human body
- The Corps (disambiguation)
- Core (disambiguation)
