= Corentin =

Corentin is a name of Breton origin. It is the name of a saint, Corentin of Quimper. It can also refer to:

== People ==
- Corentin Tolisso, French midfielder
- Corentin Corre, Breton cyclist
- Corentin Louis Kervran, Breton scientist
- Paul Féval, père (Paul Henri Corentin Féval)
- Corentin Moutet, French tennis player

== Places ==
- St. Corentin's Cathedral, Quimper
- Corentin Celton station, a Paris Metro station
- Corentin Cariou station, a Paris Metro station

== Other ==
- Corentin (comics), a series of comic books by Paul Cuvelier.
