= Ron Williams =

American businessperson

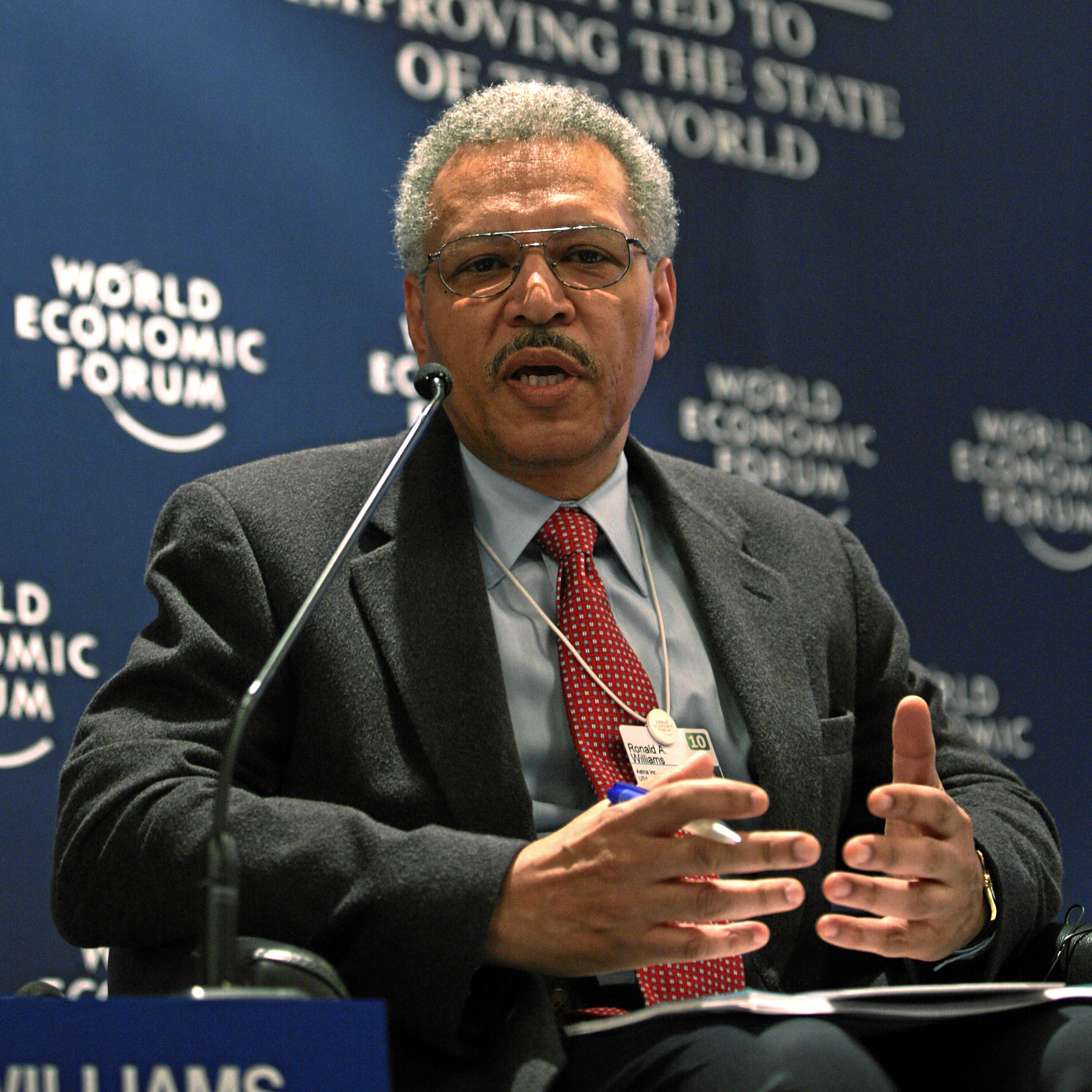
- Born: 1949 (age 76–77); Chicago, Illinois, U.S.
- Education: Roosevelt University (BA); Massachusetts Institute of Technology (MBA)

Ronald Allen Williams (born 1949) is an American businessman and board director on corporate, public sector and non-profit boards. He is the former chairman, president and chief executive officer (CEO) of Aetna Inc. and is the founder, chairman and CEO of RW2 Enterprises, LLC.

Williams is the author of Learning to Lead: The Journey to Leading Yourself, Leading Others, and Leading an Organization.

== Business leadership ==
Williams serves on the board of directors of Warby Parker. He previously served on the boards of Boeing, Johnson & Johnson, and American Express. He is an operating advisor to the private equity firm Clayton, Dubilier & Rice. (CD&R). He is co-founder and chairman of the board of agilon health and is chairman of the board of apree health, formed by the combination of VERA Whole Health and Castlight.

Williams is chairman of The Conference Board and participates with the Committee for Economic Development (CED). He was a member of the McKinsey & Company External Advisory Group until 2024.

He previously served as vice chairman of The Business Council from 2008 to 2010 and chairman of the Council for Affordable Quality Healthcare (CAQH). He was an advisor to The Wall Street Journal CEO Council and a former member of the GE Healthymagination Advisory Committee.

== Aetna leadership ==
Williams joined Aetna in 2001 and became its president and a member of its board in 2002. He became CEO in February 2006 and chairman in October of that year. He served as both chairman and CEO until November 2010 and as chairman until April 2011. During Williams’ tenure at Aetna, the company’s financial performance improved substantially; between 2001 and 2006, Aetna went from a $266 million loss to $1.7 billion in earnings.

== Public service ==
Williams serves on MIT's North America Executive Board.

In March 2011, Williams was appointed to the President's Management Advisory Board, which was assembled by U.S. President Barack Obama. He served in that capacity until 2017. He serves on the board of the Peterson Center on Healthcare board of advisors, the Peterson Institute for International Economics

In 2013 he was elected to the American Academy of Arts and Sciences, an independent, multidisciplinary policy research center.

== Early business career ==
Prior to joining Aetna, Williams served as group president, and president of WellPoint (now Anthem), having joined WellPoint's predecessor firm, Blue Cross of California, in 1987. Previously, he was co-founder of Visa Health Corp. and group marketing executive of Control Data Corporation.

== Education ==
Williams holds a Bachelor of Arts in psychology from Roosevelt University and a Master of Business Administration from the MIT Sloan School of Management.

== Awards and honors ==
- Modern Healthcare magazine's "100 Most Powerful People in Healthcare 2009"
- Black Enterprise magazine's "100 Most Powerful Executives in Corporate America, 2009"
- Institutional Investor magazine's 2009 "America's Best CEOs Health Care – Managed Care category"
