= Coria =

Coria may refer to:

== Places ==
Municipalities in Spain:

- Coria, Cáceres
- Coria del Río, Sevilla

A Brythonic equivalent of the Latin Curia, used as a place-name in Roman Britain and elsewhere:

- Coria (Corbridge), a Roman fort and town in Northumberland, England
- Coria (Inveresk), a Roman fort in Midlothian, Scotland

== Other uses ==
- Coria (surname)

== See also ==
- Corea (disambiguation)
- Corium (disambiguation)
