= Nucleus =

Nucleus (pl.: nuclei) is a Latin word for the seed inside a fruit. It most often refers to:

- Atomic nucleus, the very dense central region of an atom
- Cell nucleus, a central organelle of a eukaryotic cell, containing most of the cell's DNA

Nucleus may also refer to:

== Science, technology, and mathematics ==
=== Astronomy ===
- Active galactic nucleus in astronomy
- Comet nucleus, the solid, central part of a comet

=== Biology ===
- Cell nucleus, a central organelle of a eukaryotic cell, containing most of the cell's DNA
- Nucleus (neuroanatomy), a cluster of cell bodies of neurons in the central nervous system
- Nucleus that forms in the eye in nuclear sclerosis (early cataracts)
- Nucleus, a scientific journal concerned with the cell nucleus; published by Taylor & Francis
- Nucleus, a small colony of honeybees, induced to raise a new queen by the beekeeper

=== Computer systems ===
- Nucleus (operating system), sometimes a synonym for kernel
- Nucleus CMS, a weblog system
- Nucleus RTOS, a real-time operating system (RTOS)
- Nucleus, part of an operating system loaded by an Initial Program Load or boot loader

=== Mathematics ===
- Nucleus (algebra), the elements of a ring that associate with all others
- Nucleus (order theory), a mathematical term

=== Other sciences ===
- Nucleus (syllable), in linguistics, the central part of a syllable
- Atomic nucleus, the very dense central region of an atom
- Condensation nucleus, the seed of a raindrop
  - Ice nucleus, the seed of a snowflake

== Arts and media ==
- Nucleus (band), a jazz-rock band from Britain
- Nucleus (video game), a 2007 downloadable game on the PlayStation Store
- Nucleus (Anekdoten album), 1995
- Nucleus (Deeds of Flesh album), 2020
- Nucleus (Sonny Rollins album), 1975
- Nucleus, predecessor to Canadian rock band A Foot in Coldwater
- Nucleus, a scientific journal concerned with the cell nucleus; published by Taylor & Francis

== Other uses ==
- Nucleus (advocacy group), a UK-European political advocacy campaign organisation
- Nucleus Financial, a British financial services company
- Nucleus Limited, an Australian medical research company, taken over by Pacific Dunlop in 1988
- nuCLEus, a proposed 54-story mixed use building in Cleveland, Ohio, US
- Nucleus, the Nuclear and Caithness Archives, a British national archive
- Swadhin Bangla Biplobi Parishad, also known as Nucleus

== See also ==
- Nuclear (disambiguation)
- Nucleation
- Nucleic acid
- Nucleolus
- Core (disambiguation)
