= Margoni =

Margoni is a surname. Notable people with the surname include:

- Alain Margoni (born 1934), French classical composer
- Élisabeth Margoni (born 1945), French actress
- Stefano Margoni (born 1975), Italian ice hockey player
