= The Corps =

The Corps may refer to:

== Organizations ==
- The Corps (song), a traditional hymn of the United States Military Academy
- Texas A&M University Corps of Cadets, a student military organization at Texas A&M University
- Corps of Cadets, the collective student body of the United States Military Academy at West Point
- Xinjiang Production and Construction Corps ("The Corps"), a paramilitary and commercial organization in China

== Fiction and literature ==
- The Corps (comics), armies in the 2000 AD and Judge Dredd comic series
- Captain Britain Corps, a league of Marvel Comics super-heroes
- The Corps Series, a fictional series of books on the U.S. Marine Corps by W. E. B. Griffin

== See also ==
- Corps, a military formation or grouping
- The Corp, a student organization at Georgetown University
- Corps (disambiguation)
