= James McEntee (labor leader) =

American trade unionist, machinist and conservation expert

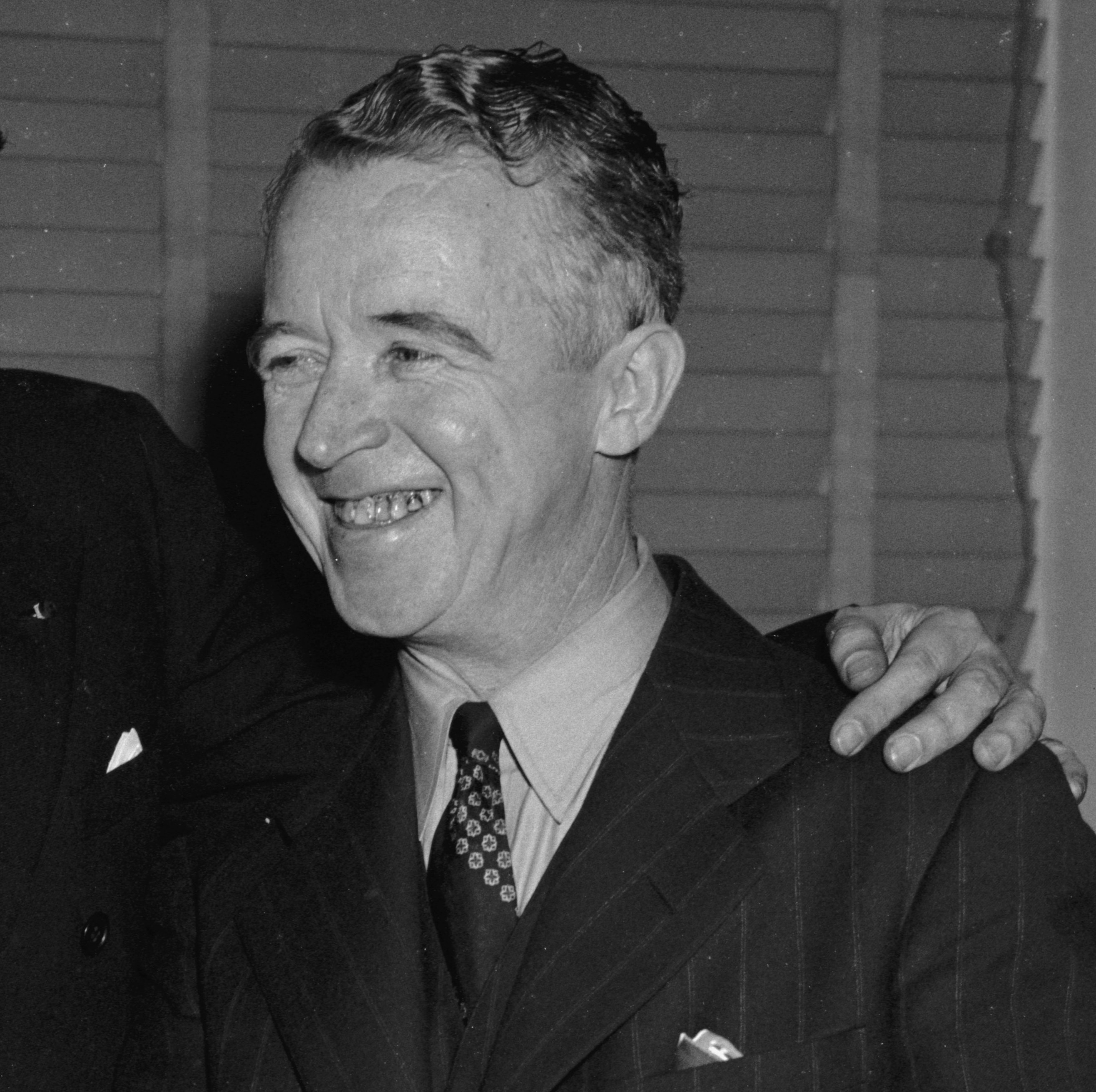
- James McEntee in 1940

Director of the Civil Conservation Corps
- In office 26 February 1940 – 1942
- President: Franklin D. Roosevelt
- Preceded by: Robert Fechner
- Succeeded by: CCC terminated

Personal details
- Born: James Joseph McEntee; 19 September 1884 Jersey City, New Jersey, U.S.
- Died: 13 October 1957 (aged 73) Jersey City, New Jersey, U.S.
- Occupation: Machinist, labor leader

James Joseph McEntee (19 September 1884 – 13 October 1957) was an American machinist and labor leader who served as the second director of the Civilian Conservation Corps from 26 February 1940 until it was terminated in 1942.

== Life and career ==
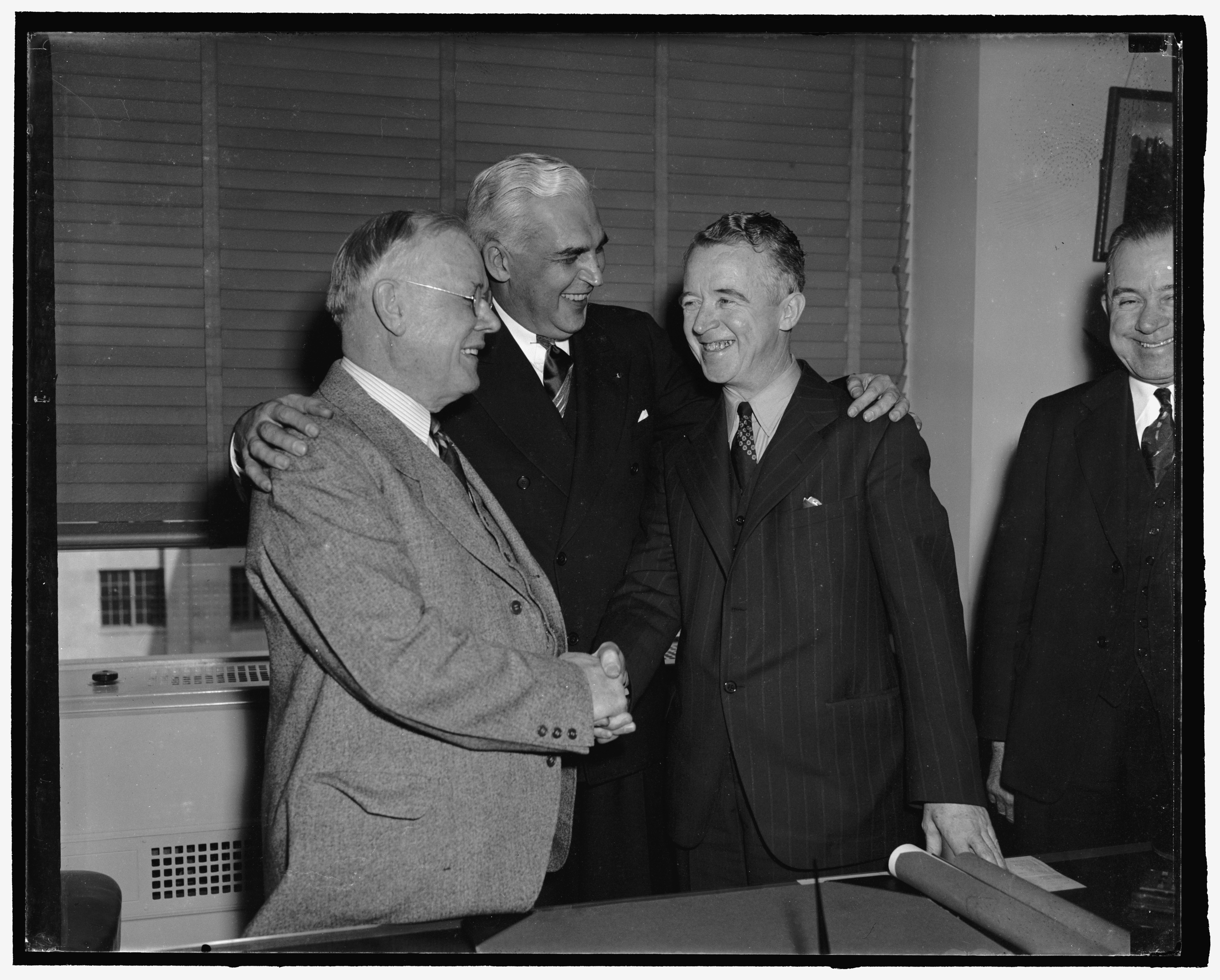
Left to right: William Green, Paul V. McNutt and James McEntee (March 7, 1940).

McEntee was born in Jersey City, New Jersey and trained in New York as an apprentice toolmaker. In 1911, he met machinist Robert Fechner and they became close friends and leaders in the International Association of Machinists. When Fechner was named the first director of CCC, he brought on McEntee as executive assistant director. McEntee was nominated as Director by President Franklin Roosevelt following the death of Fechner. The CCC grew under McEntee. The start of U.S. involvement in World War II led to a rapid conversion into part of the war effort.

McEntee returned to work for the International Association of Machinists. He died in Jersey City, New Jersey.
