= Robert Fechner =

American trade unionist, machinist and conservation expert

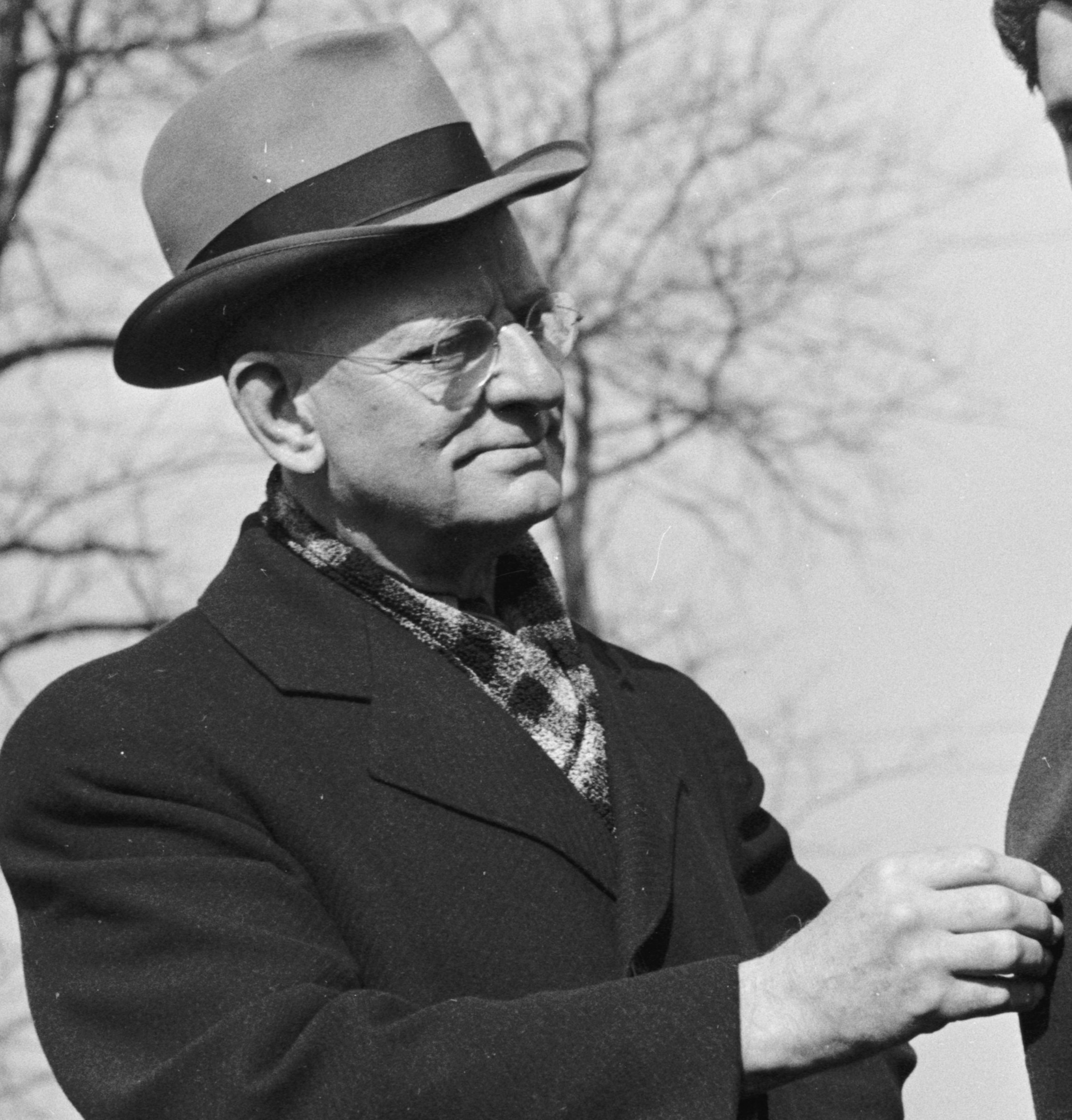
- Robert Fechner in 1939

Director of the Civilian Conservation Corps
- In office April 5, 1933 – 1939
- President: Franklin D. Roosevelt
- Preceding: Position created
- Succeeded by: James McEntee

Personal details
- Born: March 22, 1876 Chattanooga, Tennessee, U.S.
- Died: December 31, 1939 (aged 63)
- Resting place: Arlington National Cemetery
- Occupation: Labor union leader

Robert Fechner (March 22, 1876 – December 31, 1939) was a national labor union leader and director of the Civilian Conservation Corps (1933–39), which played a central role in the development of state and national parks in the United States.

Born in Chattanooga, Tennessee, with only a public school elementary education he rose to become an American labor union leader and vice president of the International Association of Machinists. He had a reputation for fairness, tact, and patience in all his dealings. On April 5, 1933 he was appointed by President Franklin D. Roosevelt to be the Director of the Civilian Conservation Corps (CCC). It was Fechner's fairness and ability for organization and administration that impressed the president to his appointment as director.

Fechner insisted on segregating the CCC making it "almost out of reach for southern blacks." He also kept blacks out of CCC leadership positions claiming that "whites would feel safer in their communities near the camp if white officers and officials were in complete control."

Although he had been an important labor figure, Fechner objected to attempts of union organizers to form unions among CCC enrollees in the camps. He felt that the government was doing all it possibly could for the well-being of the enrollees: well fed, supporting dependents with monthly earnings, getting an education; and they were contributing in a constructive manner to the conservation needs of the nation. The need for a union in this situation was not necessary, and he issued orders to keep union organizers out of the CCC camps and gave instructions that if any of the CCC enrolees joined a union they were to be discharged. Upon Fechner's death in office, he was succeeded as CCC Director by James McEntee.

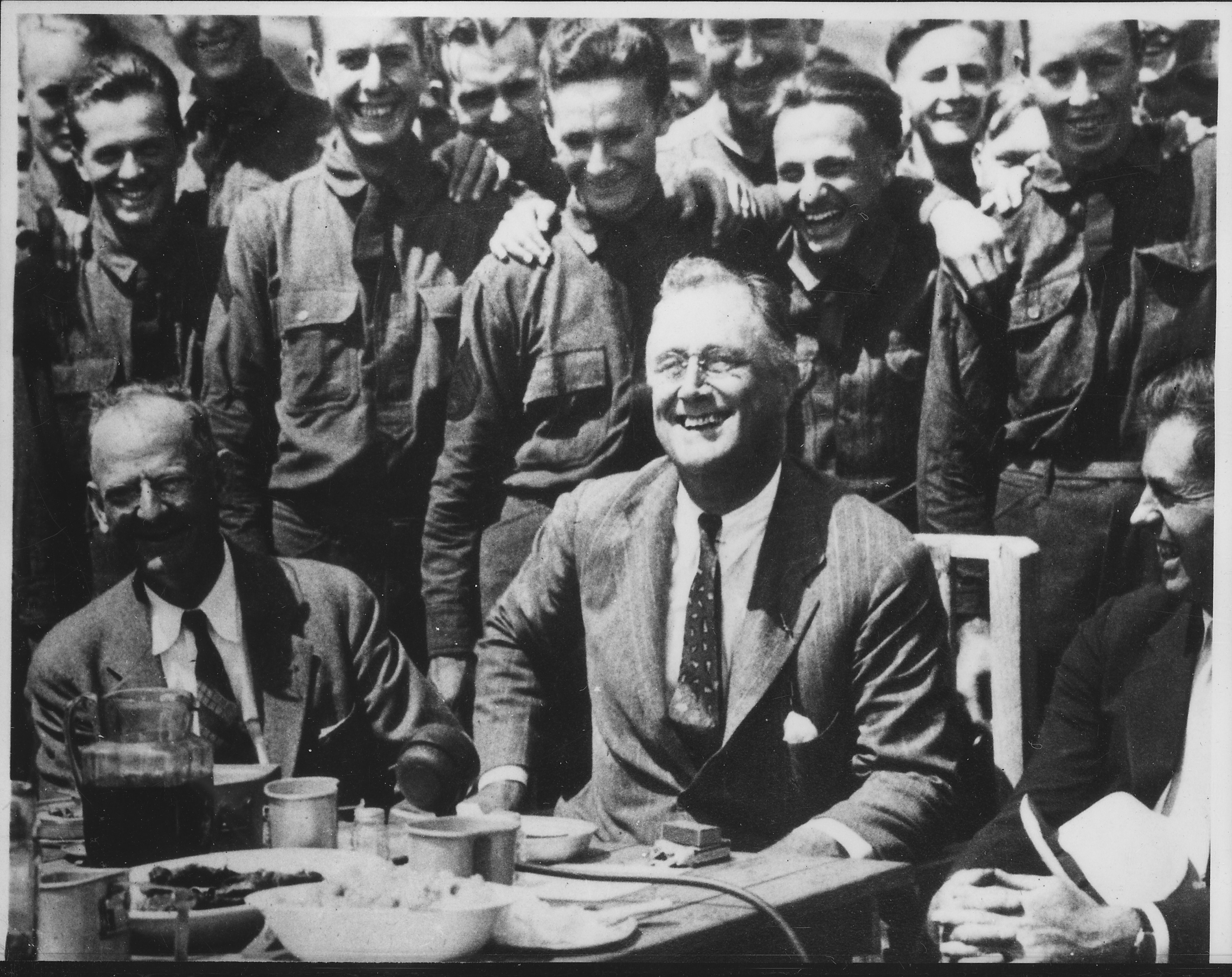
Fechner with Franklin D. Roosevelt and Henry A. Wallace

Fechner's likeness appeared on the cover of Time magazine on February 6, 1939. He was buried in Arlington National Cemetery.
