= Nuclear =

Nuclear may refer to:

== Physics ==
Relating to the nucleus of the atom:

- Nuclear engineering
- Nuclear physics
- Nuclear power
- Nuclear reactor
- Nuclear weapon
- Nuclear medicine
- Radiation therapy
- Nuclear warfare

== Mathematics ==
- Nuclear space
- Nuclear operator
- Nuclear congruence
- Nuclear C*-algebra

== Biology ==
Relating to the nucleus of the cell:

- Nuclear DNA

== Society ==
- Nuclear family, a family consisting of a pair of adults and their children

== Music ==
- "Nuclear" (band), Chilean thrash metal band
- "Nuclear" (Ryan Adams song), 2002
- "Nuclear", a song by Mike Oldfield from his Man on the Rocks album
- Nu.Clear (EP) by South Korean girl group CLC

== Films ==
- Nuclear (film), a 2022 documentary by Oliver Stone.

== See also ==
- Nucleus (disambiguation)
- Nucleolus
- Nucleation
- Nucleic acid
- Nucular
