= Corre (disambiguation) =

Corre is a commune in the Haute-Saône department of France.

Corre may also refer to:

- Corre (surname)
- "¡Corre!", by Jesse & Joy
- "Corre", by Bebe from Pafuera Telarañas, 2004

== See also ==
- Corre La Licorne, French car maker founded in 1901
- The Corre, a former professional wrestling stable in WWE
