= Alain Margoni =

French classical composer

Alain Margoni (13 October 1934) is a French classical composer.

== Life ==
Born in Neuilly-Plaisance, Margoni studied harmony with Henri Challan, counterpoint and fugue with Noël Gallon, orchestral conducting with Louis Fourestier, musical analysis with Olivier Messiaen and Ondes Martenot with Maurice Martenot. at the Conservatoire de Paris. In the competition for the Prix de Rome in 1957 and 1958 he won a second prize each and in 1959 the Premier Grand Prix with the cantata Dans les Jardins d’Armide after Torquato Tasso's Jerusalem Delivered.

After the four-year stay at the Villa Medici in Rome, he worked for nine years at the Comédie-Française, first as factotum musical, later as musical director. He then held a chair in musical analysis at the Conservatoire de Paris. He also acted as a conferencier, conductor, improviser with the Ondes Martenot, pianist and music theorist and musical comedian, the latter with Jérôme Deschamps and Alain Germain.

For Germain he wrote the music for the play Un piano pour deux pianistes, in which he himself performed with Pascal Le Corre in 1987. In addition to some 150 film, television and dramatic music, Margoni composed a musical narrative about the discovery of America, an opera, an oratorio and numerous chamber music works.

== Works ==
- Après une lecture de Goldoni, Fantasy in 18th century style for bass trombone, tuba or saxhorn and piano, 1964
- Après une lecture d’Hoffmann, Improvisation for double bass and piano, 1967
- Après une lecture de Dreiser for bassoon and piano, 1969
- Quatre personnages de Calderon for guitar, 1972
- Cadence et danses for alto saxophone and piano, 1974
- Séquence pour un hymne à la nuit for cello and piano, 1979
- Dialogue, détente et stretto for trumpet or cornet and piano, 1980
- Trois eaux-fortes for viola and piano, 1982
- Danse ancienne (chaconne) et danse moderne for two harps
- Le Petit livre de Gargantua for tenor trombone and piano in three volumes, 1982
- Petit théâtre for oboe and piano, 1982
- Elégie for trombone and piano, 1983
- Sur un thème de John Bull for French horn and piano,
- Dix Études dans le style contemporain for clarinet, 1983
- Les Caractères, Variations for oboe and piano, 1984
- Variation et hommage for clarinet
- Pierrot ou les secrets de la nuit, Opera based on a libretto by Rémi Laureillard after Michel Tournier, 1990
- Premier Quatuor de saxophones, 1991
- L'Ile des Guanahanis, musical narration based on a libretto by Rémi Laureillard for one actor, choir and orchestra, 1992
- Promenades romaines for alto saxophone and piano, 1993–95
- L'Enfant des alpages, Oratorio for children's choir, instrumental ensemble and alpine horns, 1996
- Dix Études dans le style contemporain for Saxophone, 1999
- Sonate for baritone saxophone
- soundtrack to the three-part television film Les Maîtres du pain by Hervé Baslé, 2001
- Quatre chants vénitiens for soprano, tenor saxophone and piano, 2001
