= CORE =

CORE may refer to:

- Canadian Ombudsperson for Responsible Enterprise
- Center for Operations Research and Econometrics at the University of Louvain (UCLouvain) in Belgium
- Center for Organizational Research and Education, an American non-profit entity
- CORE Boys (media organization), creator group consisting of the former FaZe Clan members.
- CORE (research service), a research service at The Open University in Buckinghamshire, England
- Central Organisation for Railway Electrification, a subsidiary of Indian Railways
- Congress of Racial Equality (CORE), an African-American civil rights organization in the United States
- Coordenadoria de Recursos Especiais (Brazil), a SWAT unit
- Committee on Operating Rules for Information Exchange, part of the Council for Affordable Quality Healthcare
- Caucus of Rand File Educators, a caucus of the Chicago Teachers Union
- Intel Core, stylized and marketed as Intel CORE as of 2009
- Lutheran CORE, or Coalition for Renewal, a non-profit organization formed in 2005
- CORE Project (Curriculum Open-Access Resources in Economics Project)
- CORE (Clinical Outcomes in Routine Use) System and CORE System Trust, see CORE-OM
- The CORE, an area (the last subarea of Hotland) in the video game Undertale
- "CORE", a track from the soundtrack of the 2015 video game Undertale by Toby Fox
- Collective Oregon Eateries, Portland, Oregon, U.S.
- CORE (Community Organized Relief Effort), Non-profit organization founded by Sean Penn and Ann Lee
