= Trémel =

Trémel Tremael
- Commune
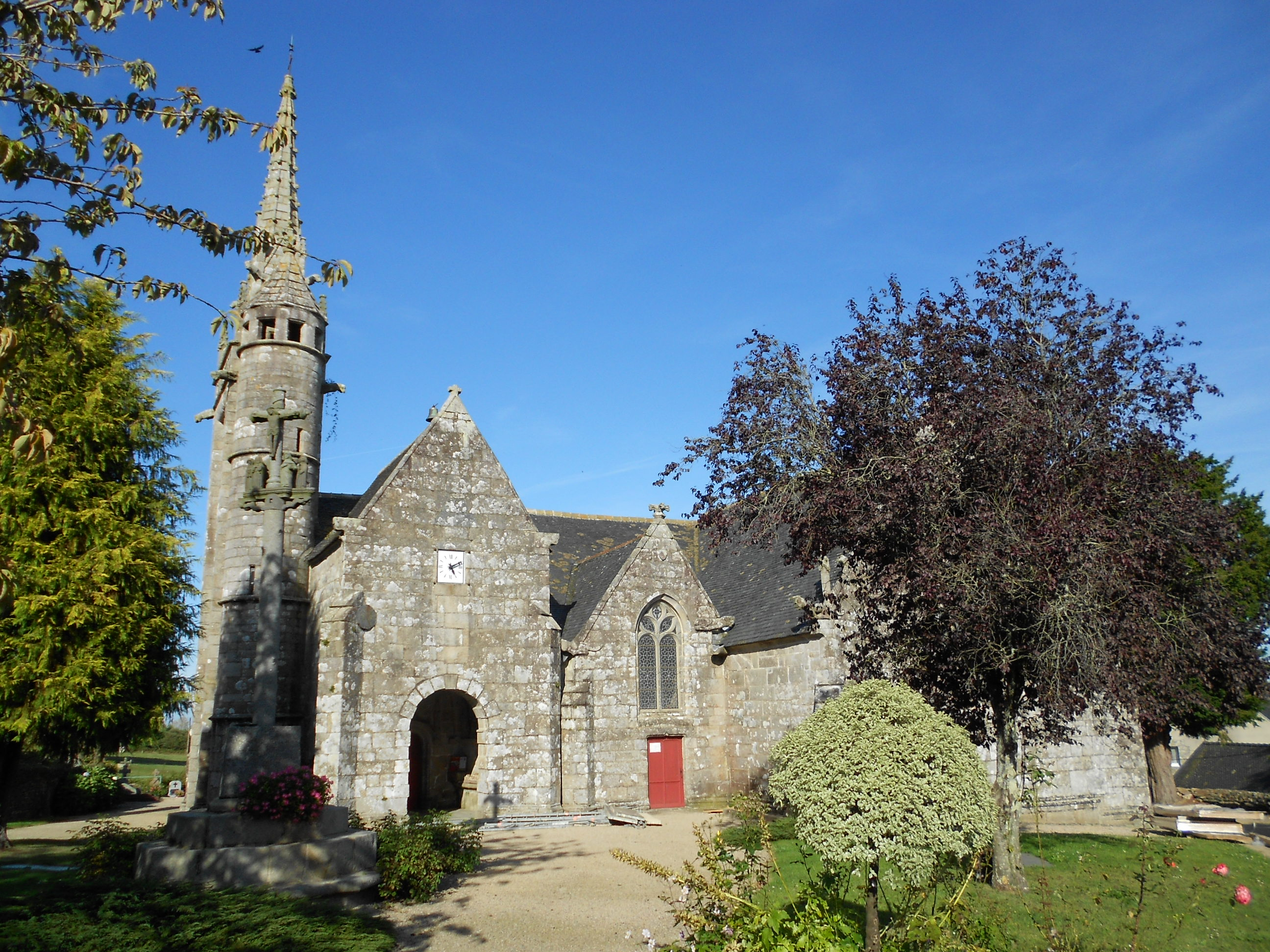
- The church of Notre-Dame de la Merci, in Trémel

- Coat of arms
- Location of Trémel
- Location within France Location within Brittany
- Coordinates: 48°36′14″N 3°36′37″W
- Country: France
- Region: Brittany
- Department: Côtes-d'Armor
- Arrondissement: Lannion
- Canton: Plestin-les-Grèves
- Intercommunality: Lannion-Trégor Communauté

Government
  - Mayor (2020–2026): Cécile Auriac
- Area^{1}: 11.93 km^{2} (4.61 sq mi)
- Highest elevation: 155 m (509 ft)
- Lowest elevation: 25 m (82 ft)
- Population (2023): 409
  - Density: 34.3/km^{2} (88.8/sq mi)
- Time zone: UTC+01:00 (CET)
  - Summer (DST): UTC+02:00 (CEST)
- INSEE/Postal code: 22366 /22310
- ^{1} French Land Register data, which excludes lakes, ponds, glaciers > 1 km^{2} (0.386 sq mi or 247 acres) and river estuaries.

Trémel (French pronunciation: [tʁemɛl]; Breton: Tremael) is a commune in the Côtes-d'Armor department of the region of Brittany in northwestern France.

== Population ==
Historical population
Year	Pop.	±% p.a.
1968	508	—
1975	465	−1.26%
1982	446	−0.59%
1990	403	−1.26%
1999	393	−0.28%
2007	398	+0.16%
2012	431	+1.61%
2017	411	−0.95%
2023	409	−0.08%
Source: INSEE

Inhabitants of Trémel are called trémélois in French.

== See also ==
- Communes of the Côtes-d'Armor department
