= Corentin Corre =

French cyclist

Personal information
- Born: 19th century Trémel, Brittany, France
- Died: 20th century

Cycling career
- Sport: Cycling
- Role: Rider

Major wins
- 4th in Paris–Brest–Paris (1891)

Corentin Corre (Trémel) was a Breton cyclist. He participated in the first Paris–Brest–Paris race in 1891 (he arrived fourth out of 207 participants).
