= Civilian Conservation Corps =

US voluntary public work relief program, 1933–42

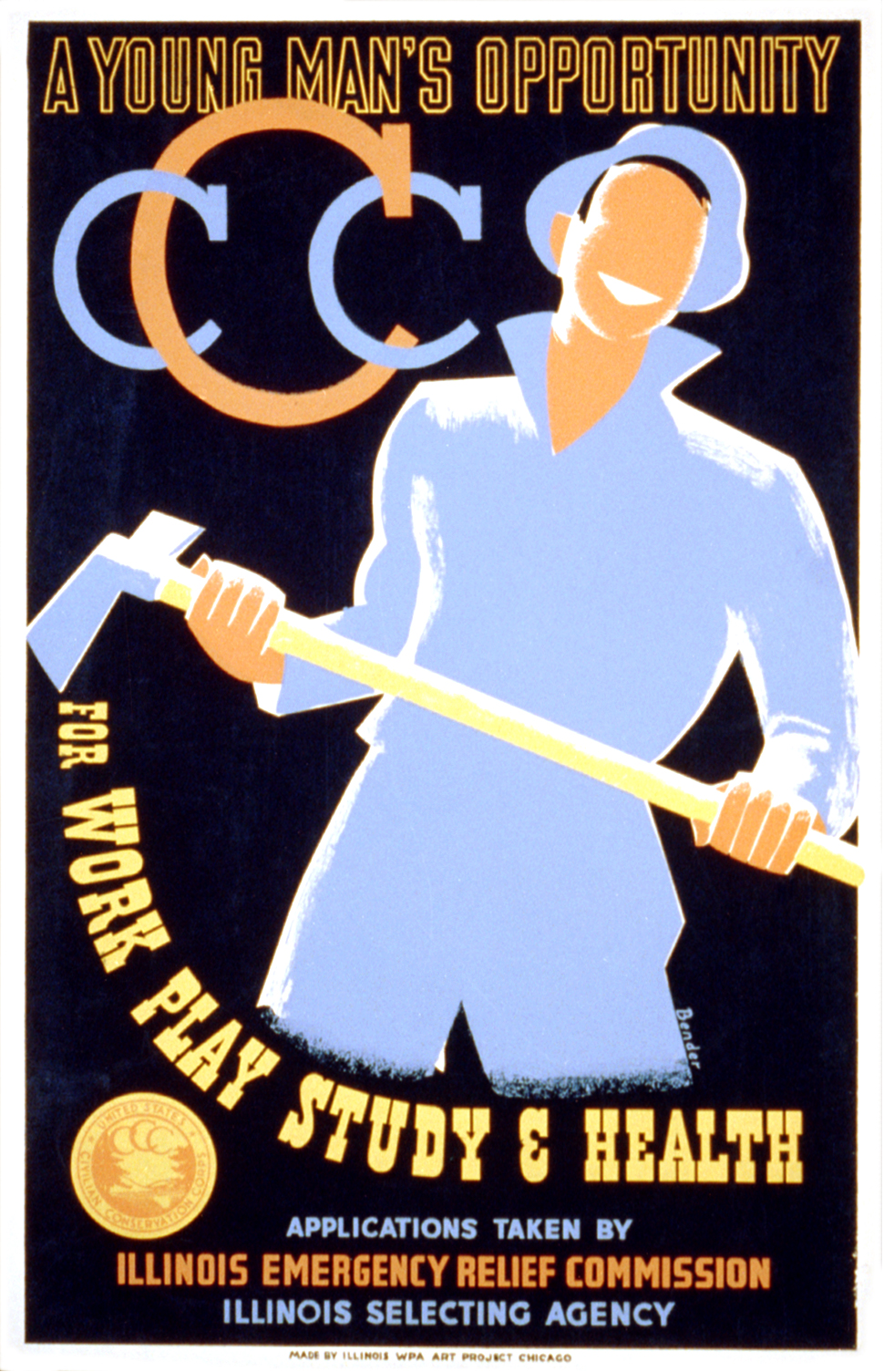
Poster by Albert M. Bender, produced by the Illinois WPA Art Project Chicago in 1935 for the CCC

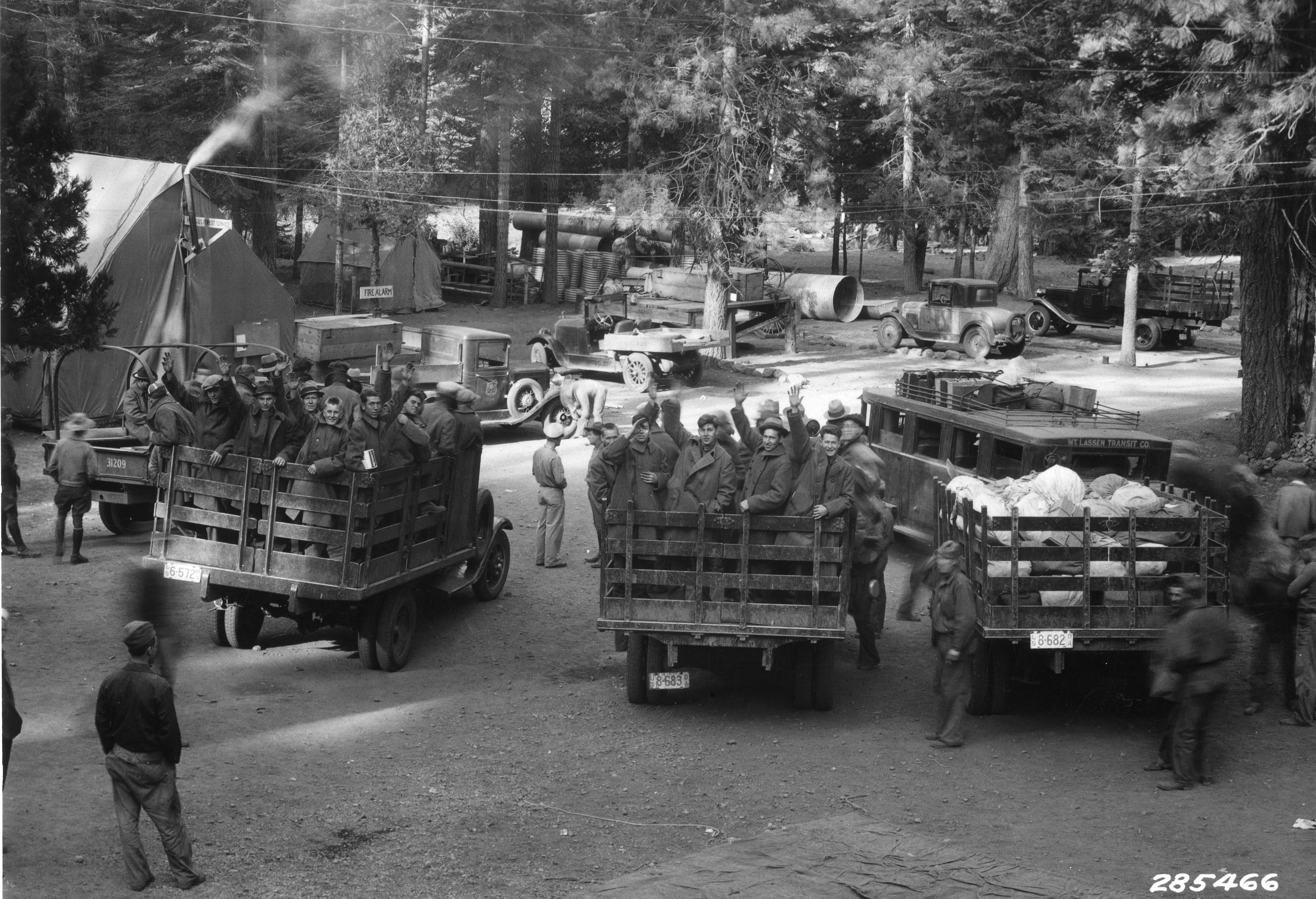
CCC boys leaving camp in Lassen National Forest for home

The Civilian Conservation Corps (CCC) was a government work relief program that ran from 1933 to 1942 in the United States for unemployed, unmarried men ages 18–25 and eventually expanded to ages 17–28, who volunteered amid widespread unemployment. The CCC was a major part of President Franklin D. Roosevelt's New Deal that supplied manual labor jobs related to the conservation and development of natural resources in rural lands owned by federal, state, and local governments. The CCC was designed to supply jobs for young men and to relieve families who had difficulty finding jobs during the Great Depression in the United States. There was a smaller counterpart program for unemployed women called the She-She-She Camps, which were championed by Eleanor Roosevelt.

Robert Fechner was the first director of this agency, succeeded by James McEntee following Fechner's death. The largest enrollment at any one time was 300,000. Through the course of its nine years in operation, three million young men took part in the CCC, which provided them with shelter, clothing, and food, together with a monthly wage of $30 (equivalent to $746 in 2025), $25 of which (equivalent to $622 in 2025) had to be sent home to their families.

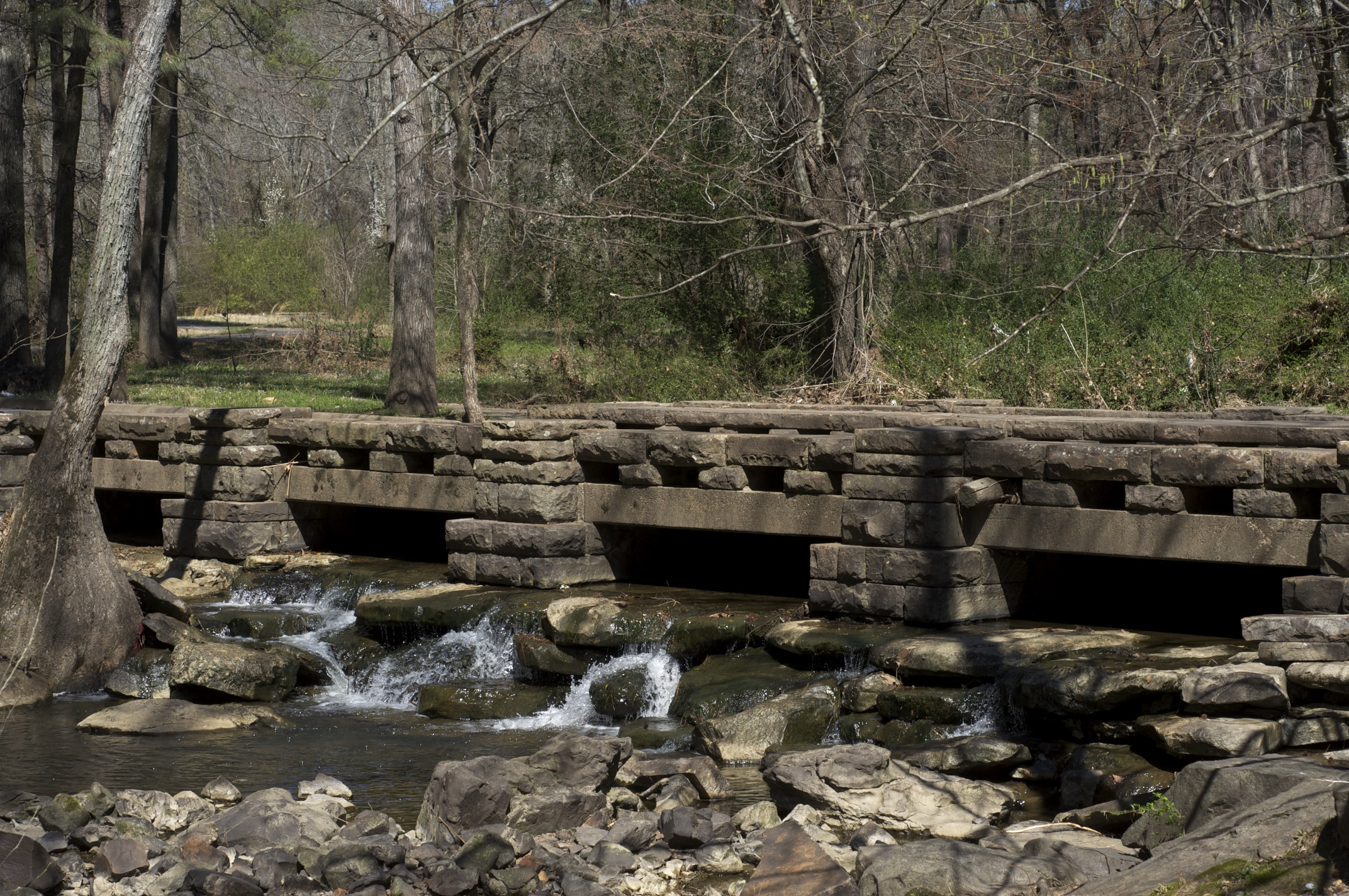
A CCC-built bridge across Rock Creek in Little Rock, Arkansas

The American public made the CCC the most popular of all the New Deal programs. Sources written at the time claimed an individual's enrollment in the CCC led to improved physical condition, heightened morale, and increased employability. The CCC also led to a greater public awareness and appreciation of the outdoors and the nation's natural resources, and the continued need for a carefully planned, comprehensive national program for the protection and development of natural resources.

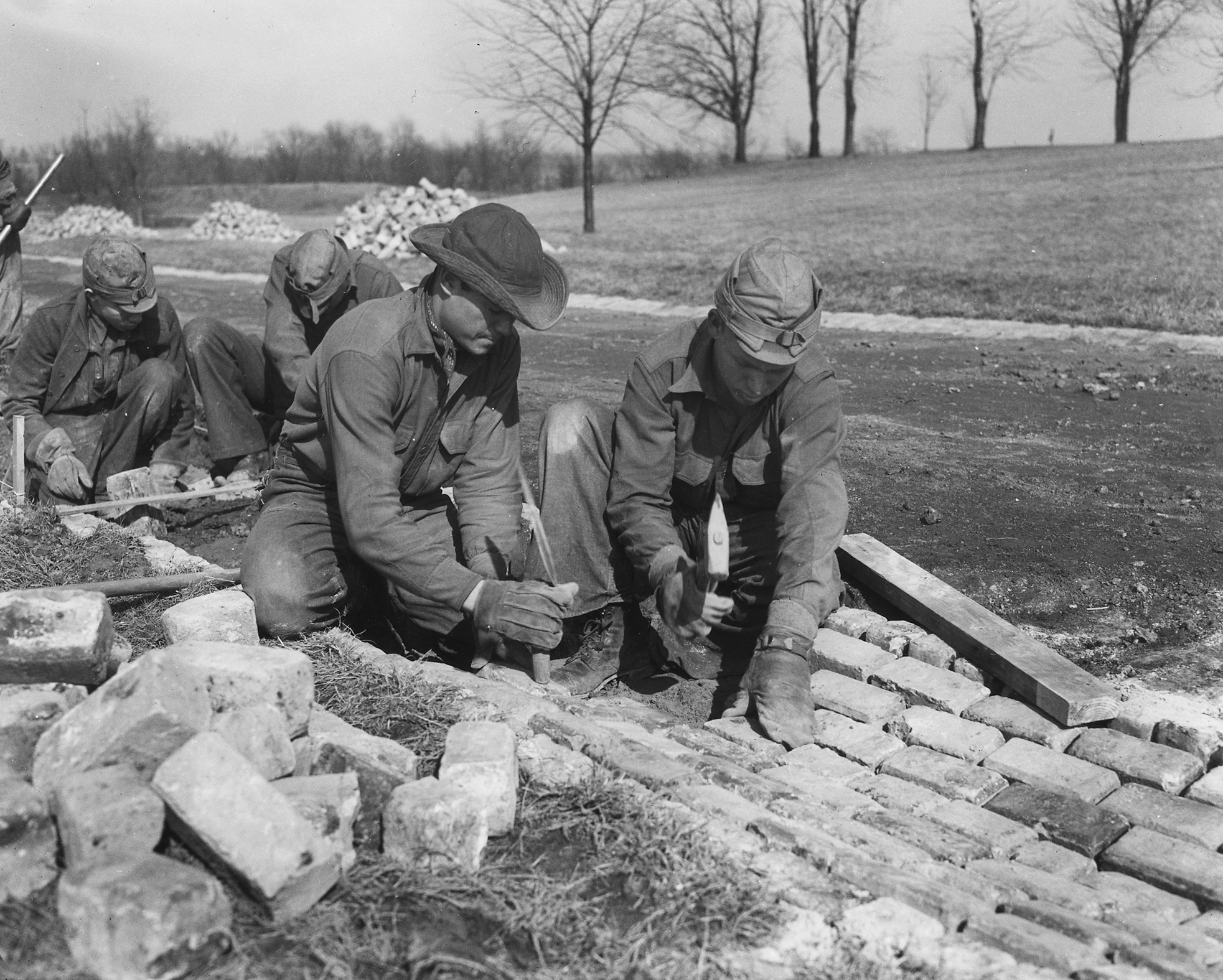
CCC workers constructing a road in what is now Cuyahoga Valley National Park, 1933

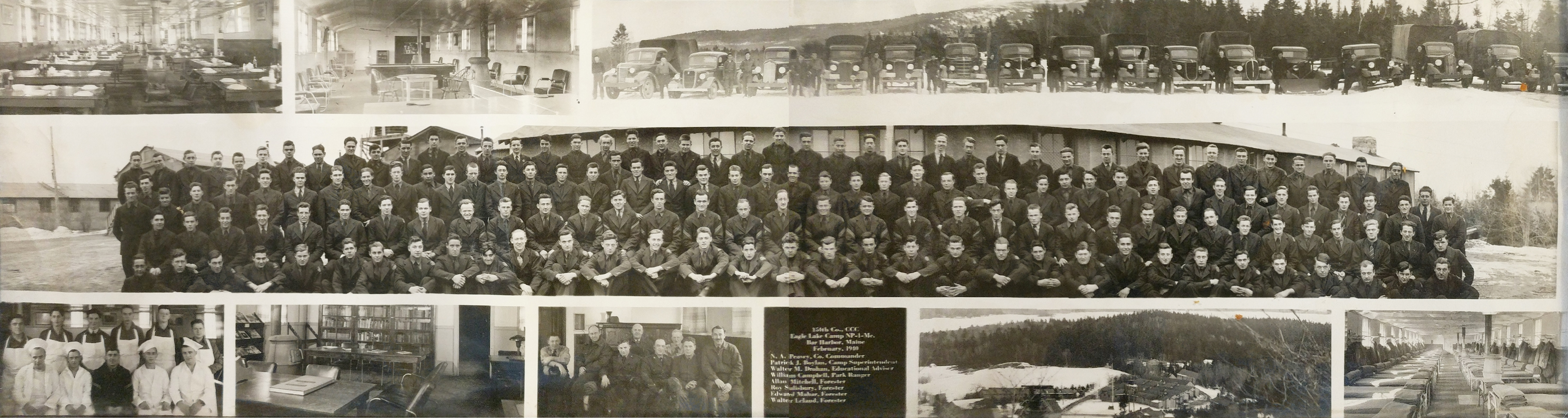
154th Co.. CCC, Eagle Lake Camp NP-1-Me. Bar harbor Maine, February 1940

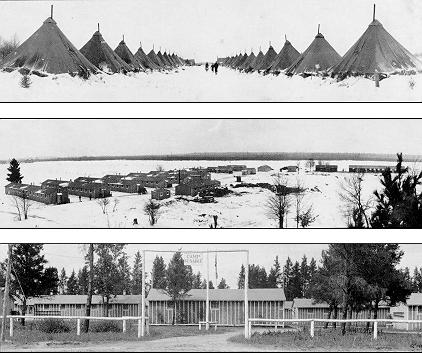
CCC camps in Michigan; the tents were soon replaced by barracks built by Army contractors for the enrollees.

The CCC operated separate programs for veterans and Native Americans. Approximately 15,000 Native Americans took part in the program, helping them weather the Great Depression.

By 1942, with World War II raging and the draft in effect, the need for work relief declined, and Congress voted to close the program.

== Founding ==
As governor of New York, Franklin D. Roosevelt had run a similar program on a much smaller scale, known as the Temporary Emergency Relief Administration (TERA). It was started in early 1932 to "use men from the lists of the unemployed to improve our existing reforestation areas". In its first year alone, more than 25,000 unemployed New Yorkers were active in its paid conservation work. Long interested in conservation, as president Roosevelt proposed a full-scale national program to Congress on March 21, 1933:

I propose to create [the CCC] to be used in complex work, not interfering with normal employment and confining itself to forestry, the prevention of soil erosion, flood control, and similar projects. I call your attention to the fact that this type of work is of definite, practical value, not only through the prevention of great present financial loss but also as a means of creating future national wealth.

He promised this law would provide 250,000 young men with meals, housing, workwear, and medical care in exchange for their work in the national forests and other government properties. The Emergency Conservation Work (ECW) Act was introduced to Congress the same day and enacted by voice vote on March 31. Roosevelt issued Executive Order 6101 on April 5, 1933, which established the CCC organization and appointed a director, Robert Fechner, a former labor union official who served until 1939. The organization and administration of the CCC was a new experiment in operations for a federal government agency. The order directed that the program be supervised jointly by four government departments: Labor, which recruited the young men; War, which operated the camps; the Agriculture; and Interior, which organized and supervised the work projects. A CCC Advisory Council was composed of a representative from each of those departments. In addition, the Office of Education and Veterans Administration participated in the program. To overcome opposition from labor unions, which wanted no training programs started when so many of their members were unemployed, Roosevelt chose Robert Fechner, vice president of the International Association of Machinists and Aerospace Workers, as director of the Corps. William Green, head of the American Federation of Labor, was taken to the first camp to see that there was no job training involved beyond simple manual labor.

== U.S. Army ==
Officers from the U.S. Army were in charge of the camps, but there was no military training. The Chief of Staff of the United States Army, General Douglas MacArthur, was placed in charge of the program. Initially, about 3,800 of the Regular Army's 13,000 officers and 4,600 of its 120,000 enlisted men were assigned in the spring of 1933 to administer the CCC. The troops were pulled from just about every source possible, but usually from the Army's combat regiments and battalions, and Army instructors on duty with ROTC, Organized Reserve, and National Guard organizations. In at least one case each, district personnel were drawn from an engineer regiment and an Air Corps group. MacArthur soon said that the number of Regular Army personnel assigned to the CCC was affecting military readiness.

Only 575 Organized Reserve officers initially received orders for CCC duty. CCC tours were initially six months long, but were later lengthened to one year. In July 1933, the War Department ordered that Regular Army officers assigned as instructors with ROTC and Organized Reserve units be returned to their former duties. By the end of September 1933, the number of Regular officers on CCC duty had dropped to about 2,000 and the number of Reservists had increased to 2,200. By June 1934, only 400 Regular officers remained on CCC duty, and by October, Reserve officers had assumed command of almost all CCC companies and sub-districts. Effective on 1 January 1938, the War Department limited the number of Regular officers assigned to CCC duty to only 117.

Due to a ruling that Reserve officers on CCC duty had to have the same housing and subsistence benefits as Regular officers, President Roosevelt directed that all Reservists be relieved from CCC duty effective 1 July 1939. The changeover was complete by September 1939, but it was a change largely in name only because many of the Reservists merely took off their uniforms and continued their jobs with the CCC as civilians, albeit with lower pay.

The Army found numerous benefits in the program. Through the CCC, the Regular Army could assess the leadership performance of both Regular and Reserve officers. In mobilizing, clothing, feeding, and controlling thousands of men, the CCC provided lessons which the Army used in developing its wartime mobilization plans for training camps. When the draft began in 1940, the policy was to make CCC alumni corporals and sergeants. The CCC also provided command experience to Reserve officers, who normally interacted almost exclusively with other officers during training and did not have the chance to lead large numbers of enlisted men. Future Chief of Staff of the Army General George C. Marshall "embraced" the CCC, unlike many of his brother officers.

== History ==
An implicit goal of the CCC was to restore morale in an era of 25% unemployment for all men and much higher rates for poorly educated teenagers. Jeffrey Suzik argues in "'Building Better Men': The CCC Boy and the Changing Social Ideal of Manliness" that the CCC provided an ideology of manly outdoor work to counter the Depression, as well as cash to help the family budget. Through a regime of heavy manual labor, civic and political education, and an all-male living and working environment, the CCC tried to build "better men" who would be economically independent and self-reliant. By 1939, there was a shift in the ideal from the hardy manual worker to the highly trained citizen soldier ready for war.

=== Early years, 1933–1937 ===
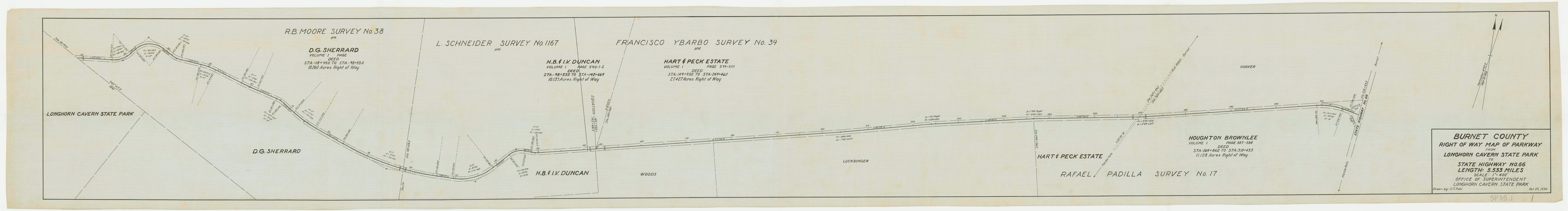
A CCC map of the planned route of a parkway in Texas, drafted in 1934. The Corps worked in numerous parks throughout the state during the early 1930s, constructing everything from benches to highways.

The legislation and mobilization of the program occurred quite rapidly. Roosevelt made his request to Congress on March 21, 1933; the legislation was submitted to Congress the same day; Congress passed it by voice vote on March 31; Roosevelt signed it the same day, then issued an executive order on April 5 creating the agency, appointing Fechner its director, and assigning War Department corps area commanders to begin enrollment. The first CCC enrollee was selected April 8, and lists of unemployed men were subsequently supplied by state and local welfare and relief agencies for immediate enrollment. On April 17, the first camp, NF-1, Camp Roosevelt, was established at George Washington National Forest near Luray, Virginia. On June 18, the first of 161 soil erosion control camps was opened in Clayton, Alabama. By July 1, 1933, there were 1,463 working camps with 250,000 junior enrollees 18–25 years of age; 28,000 veterans; 14,000 Native Americans; and 25,000 adults in the Local Experienced Men (LEM) program.

=== Enrollees ===
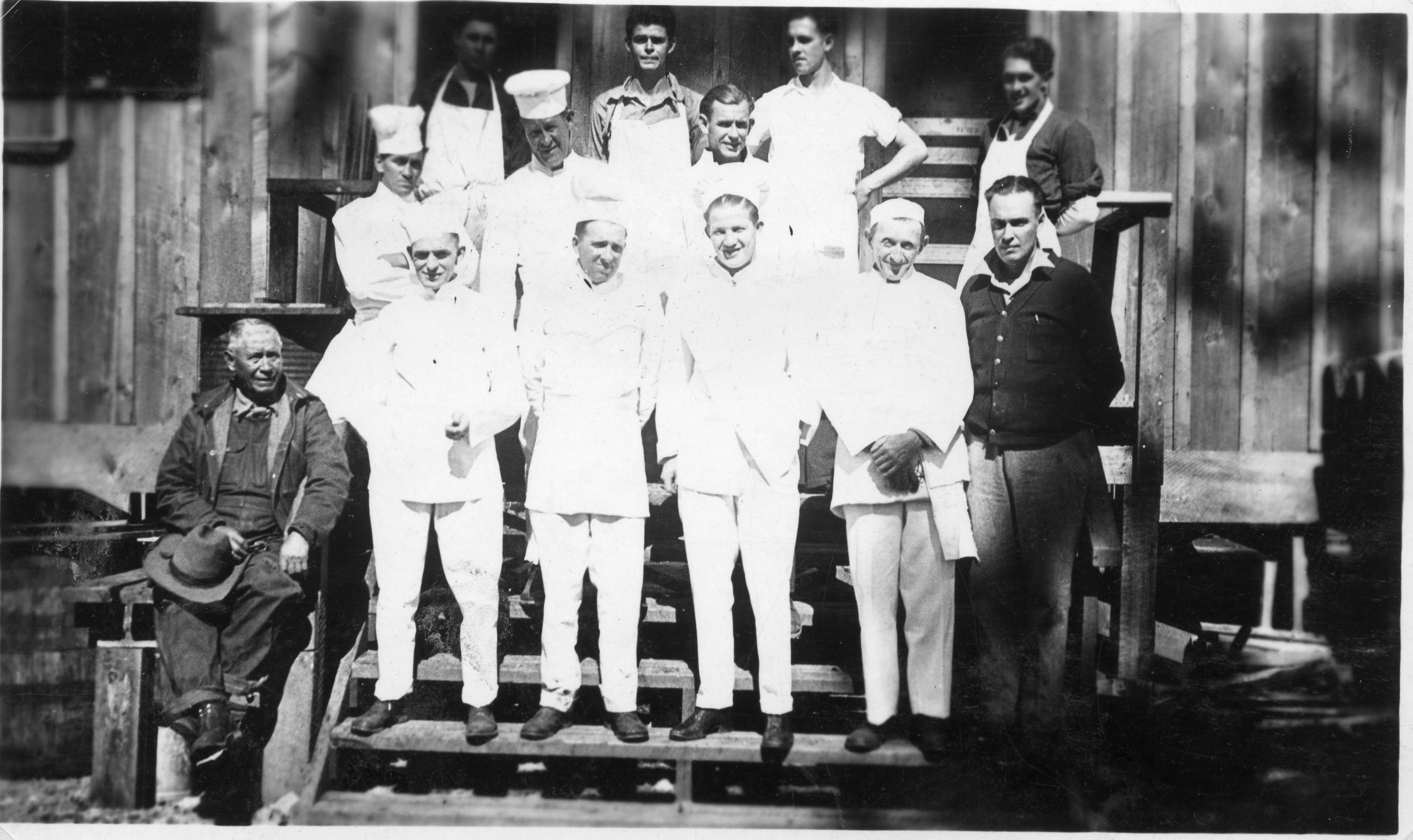
CCC camp kitchen crew

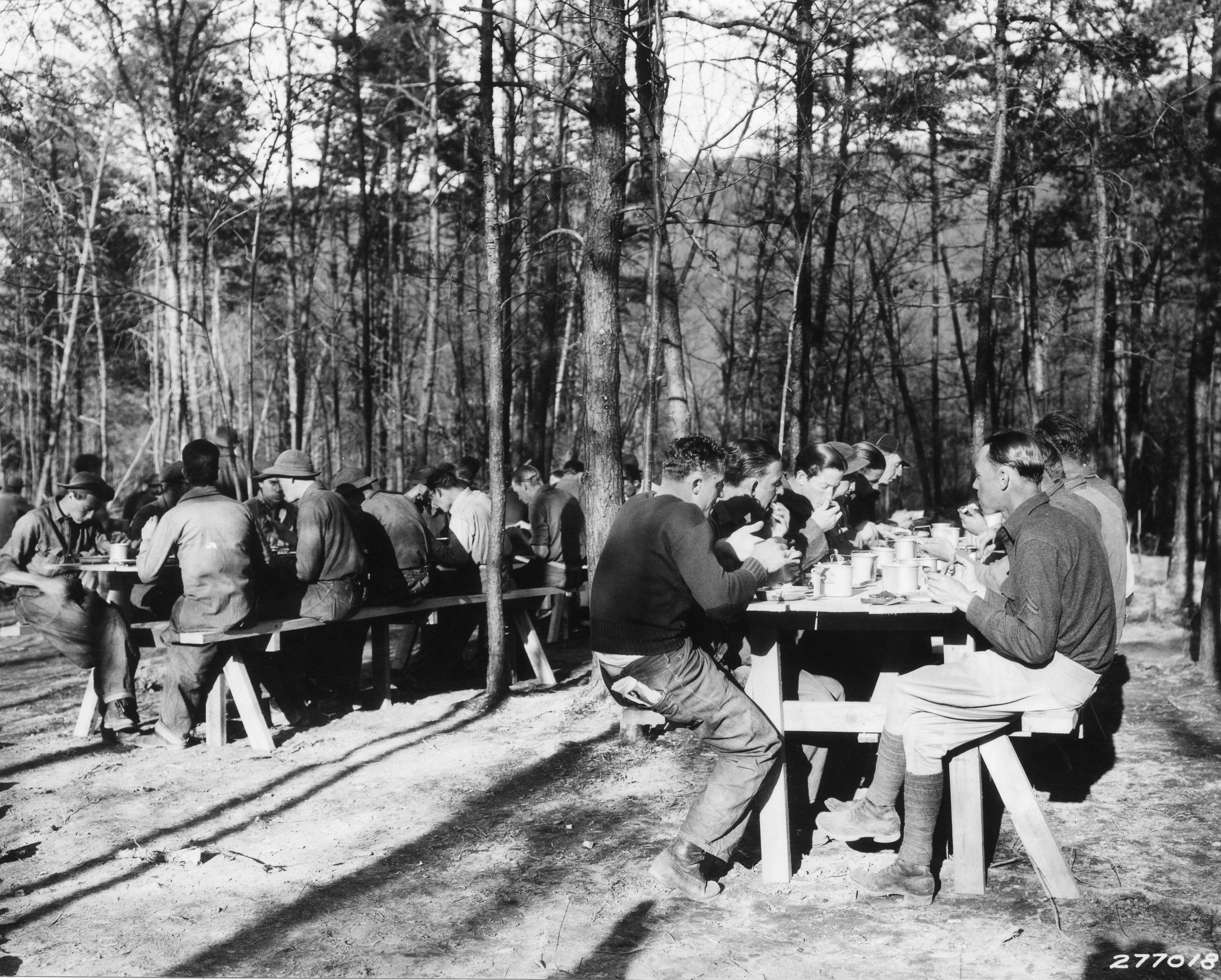
Meal time at CCC Camp Roosevelt, George Washington National Forest, Virginia

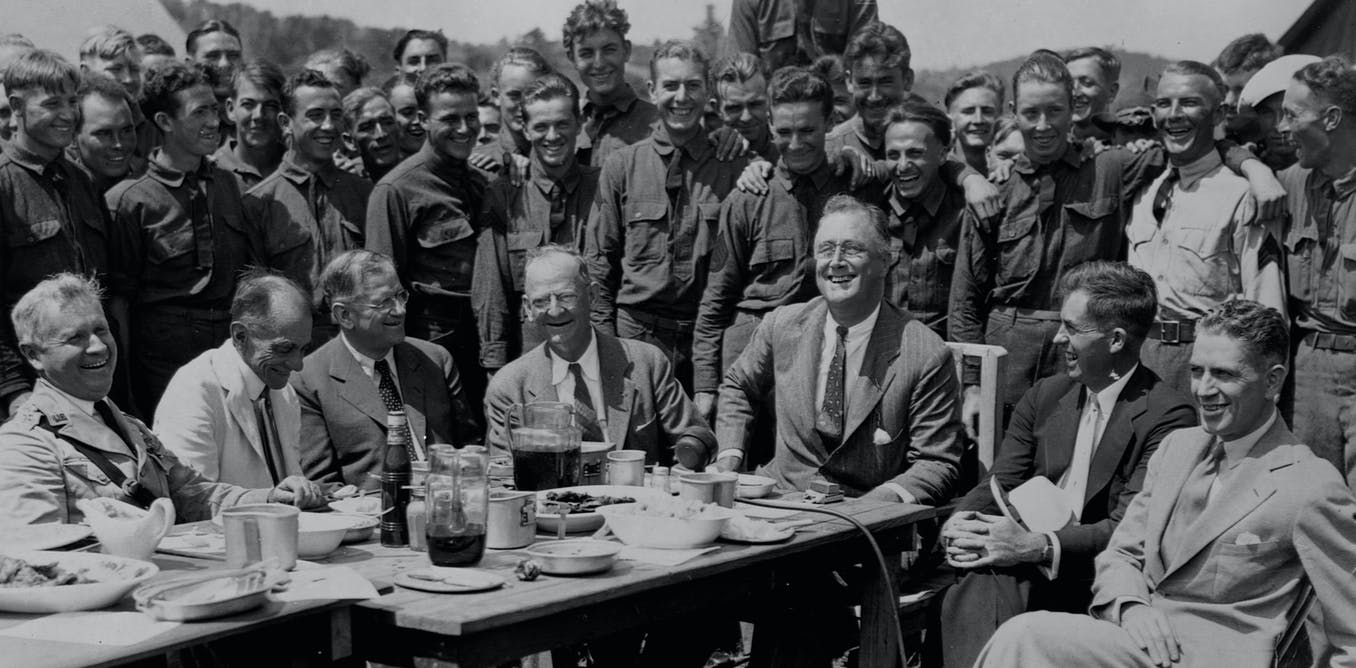
President Franklin D. Roosevelt made his first visit to a CCC camp, at Big Meadows in Shenandoah National Park, Virginia, in early summer, 1933. Seated, left to right: Major General Paul B. Malone, commanding general of the Third Corps Area; Louis Howe, secretary to the president; Secretary of the Interior Harold L. Ickes; CCC Director Robert Fechner; the president; Secretary of Agriculture Henry A. Wallace; and Assistant Secretary of Agriculture Rexford G. Tugwell.

The typical CCC enrollee was a U.S. citizen, unmarried, unemployed male, 18–25 years of age. Normally his family was on local relief. Each enrollee volunteered and, upon passing a physical exam and/or a period of conditioning, was required to serve a minimum six-month period, with the option to serve as many as four periods, or up to two years if employment outside the Corps was not possible. Enrollees worked 40 hours per week over five days, sometimes including Saturdays if poor weather dictated. In return they received $30 per month (equivalent to $750 in 2025) with a compulsory allotment of $25 (about equivalent to $620 in 2025) sent to a family dependent, as well as housing, food, clothing, and medical care.

==== Veterans Conservation Corps ====
Following the second Bonus Army march on Washington, D.C., President Roosevelt amended the CCC program on May 11, 1933, to include work opportunities for veterans. Veteran qualifications differed from the junior enrollee; one needed to be certified by the Veterans Administration by an application. They could be any age, and married or single as long as they were in need of work. Veterans were generally assigned to entire veteran camps. Enrollees were eligible for the following "rated" positions to help with camp administration: senior leader, mess steward, storekeeper and two cooks; assistant leader, company clerk, assistant educational advisor and three second cooks. These men received additional pay ranging from $36 to $45 per month depending on their rating.

=== Camps ===
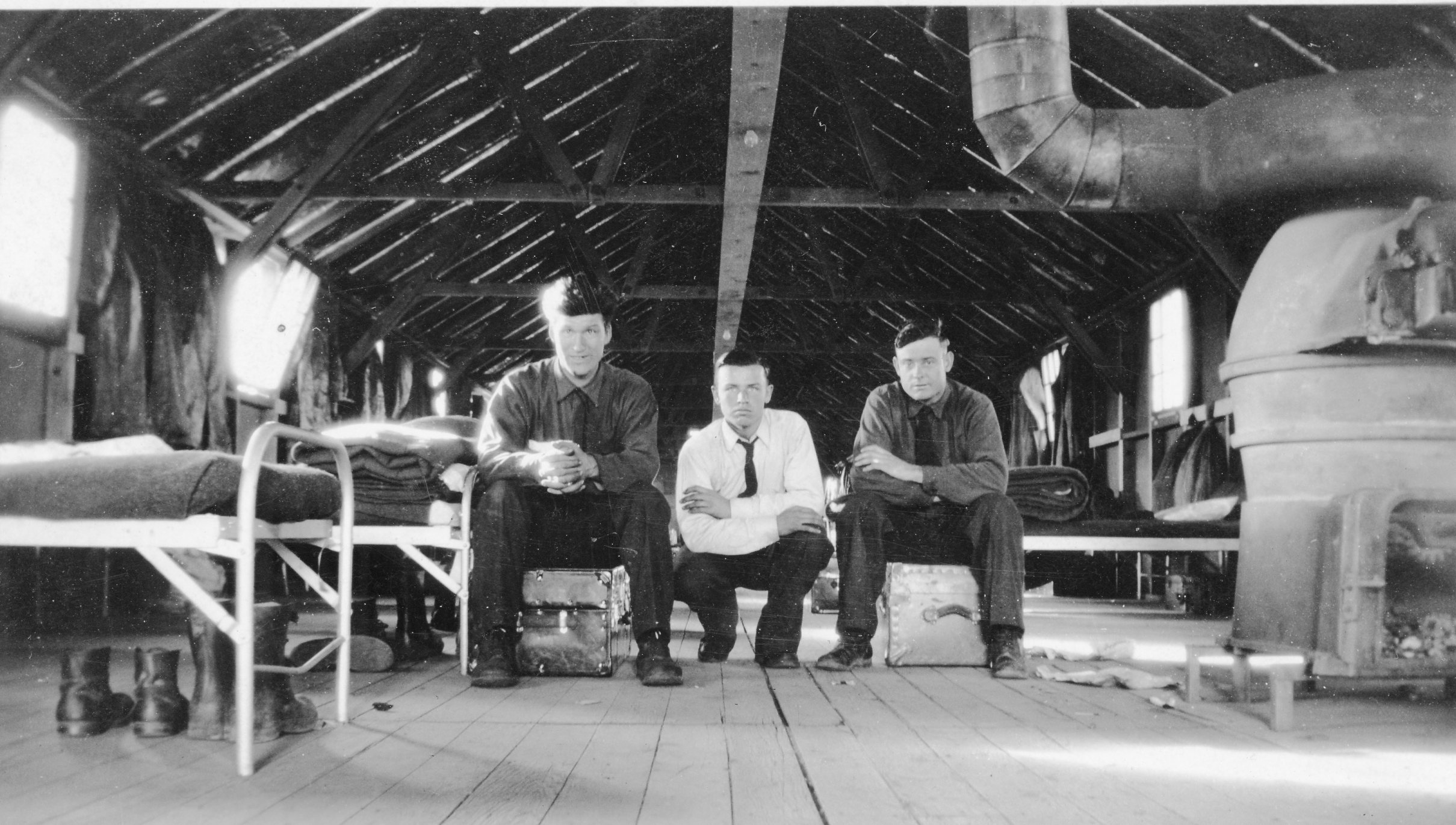
Inside of CCC barracks at Milford, Utah. Two of the men are sitting on footlockers that were used by the CCC workers to hold their personal possessions.

Each CCC camp was located in the area of particular conservation work to be performed and organized around a complement of up to 200 civilian enrollees in a designated numbered "company" unit. The CCC camp was a temporary community in itself, structured to have barracks (initially Army tents) for 50 enrollees each, officer/technical staff quarters, medical dispensary, mess hall, recreation hall, educational building, lavatory and showers, technical/administrative offices, tool room/blacksmith shop and motor pool garages.

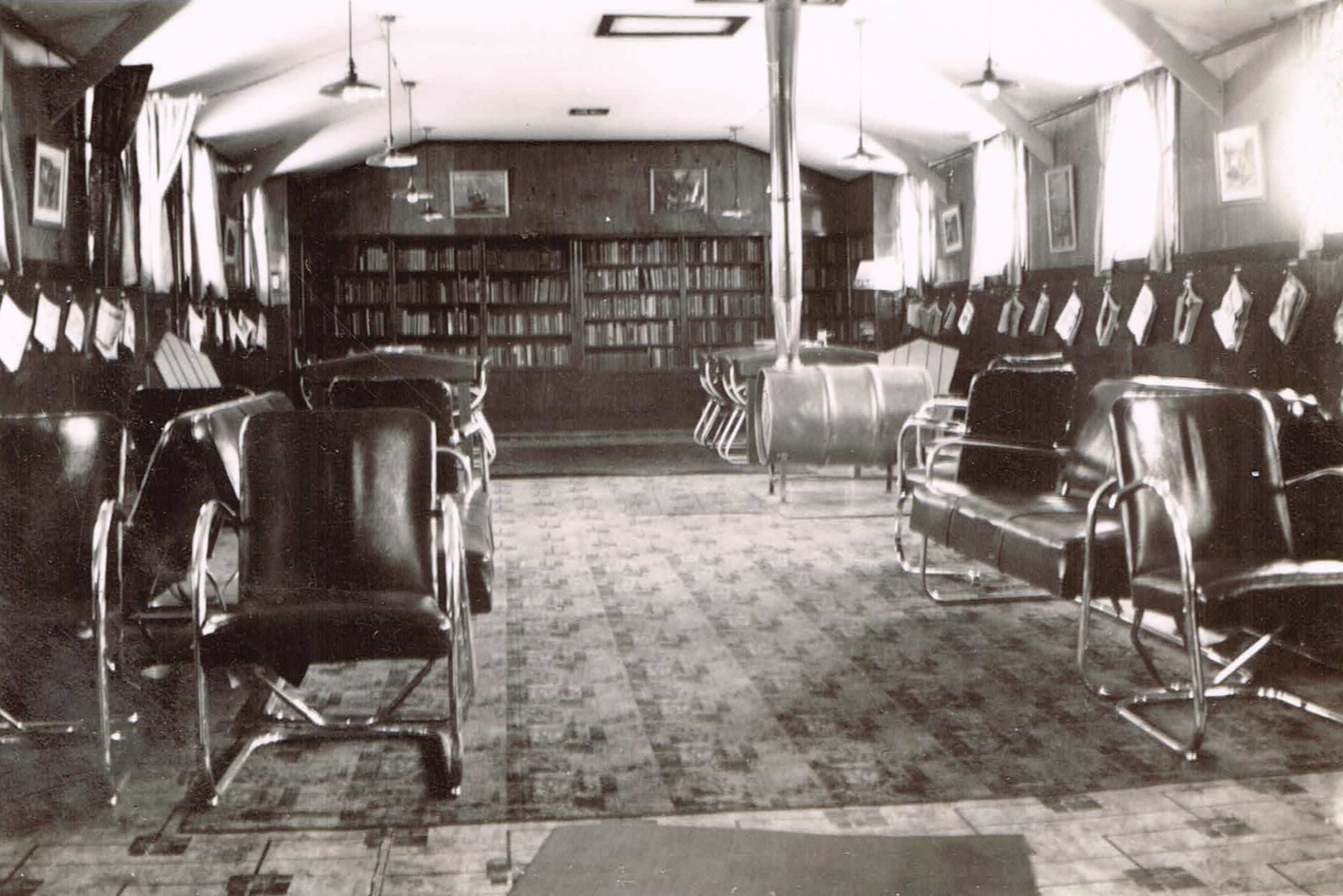
CCC Camp recreational hall or educational building (unidentified location)

The company organization of each camp had a dual-authority supervisory staff: firstly, Department of War personnel or Reserve officers (until July 1, 1939), a "company commander" and junior officer, who were responsible for overall camp operation, logistics, education and training; and secondly, ten to fourteen technical service civilians, including a camp "superintendent" and "foreman", employed by either the Departments of Interior or Agriculture, responsible for the particular fieldwork. Also included in camp operation were several non-technical supervisor LEMs, who provided knowledge of the work at hand, "lay of the land", and paternal guidance for inexperienced enrollees. Enrollees were organized into work detail units called "sections" of 25 men each, according to the barracks they resided in. Each section had an enrollee "senior leader" and "assistant leader" who were accountable for the men at work and in the barracks.

=== Work classifications ===
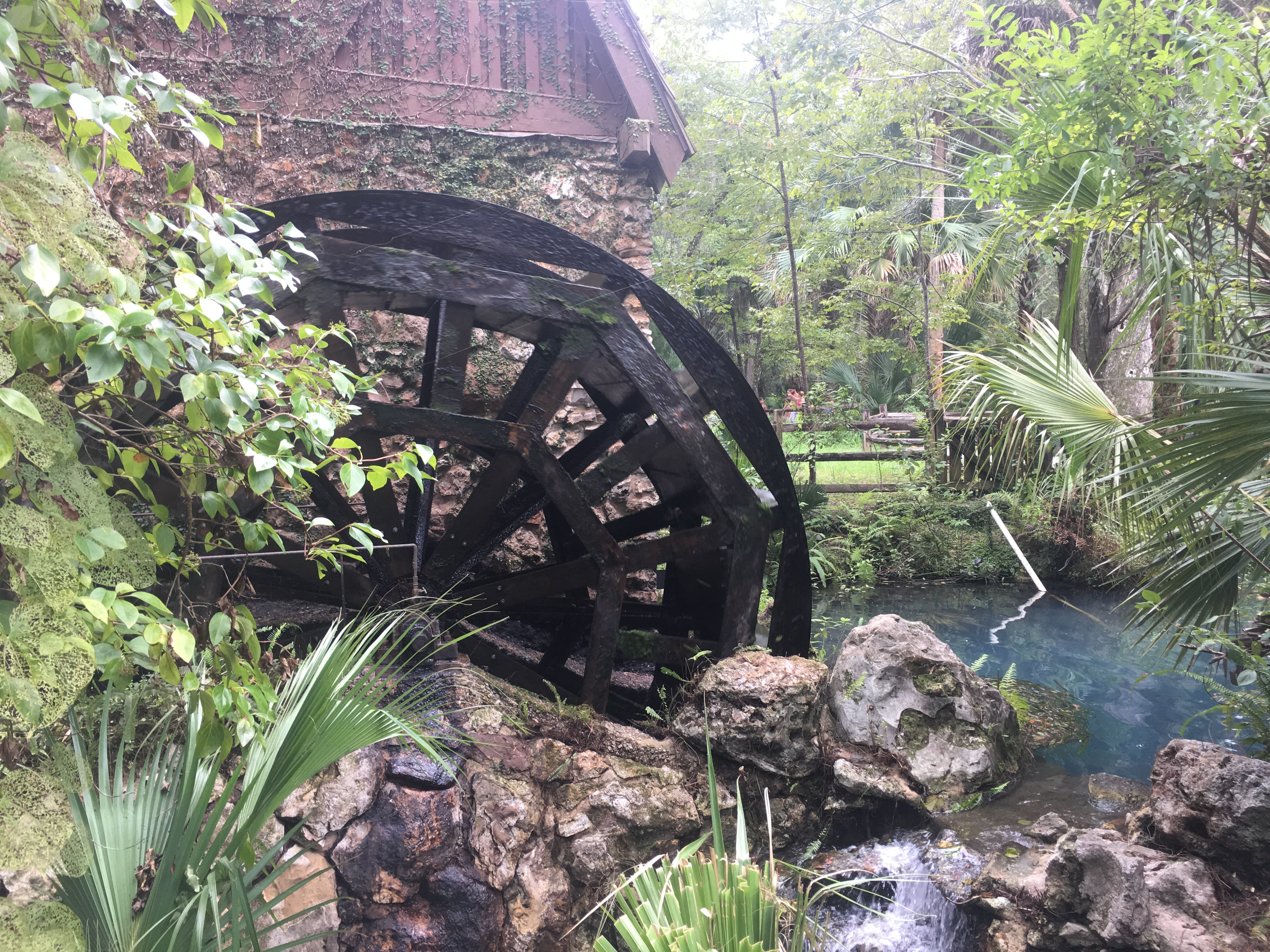
Millhouse and waterwheel at Juniper Springs Florida built by the CCC

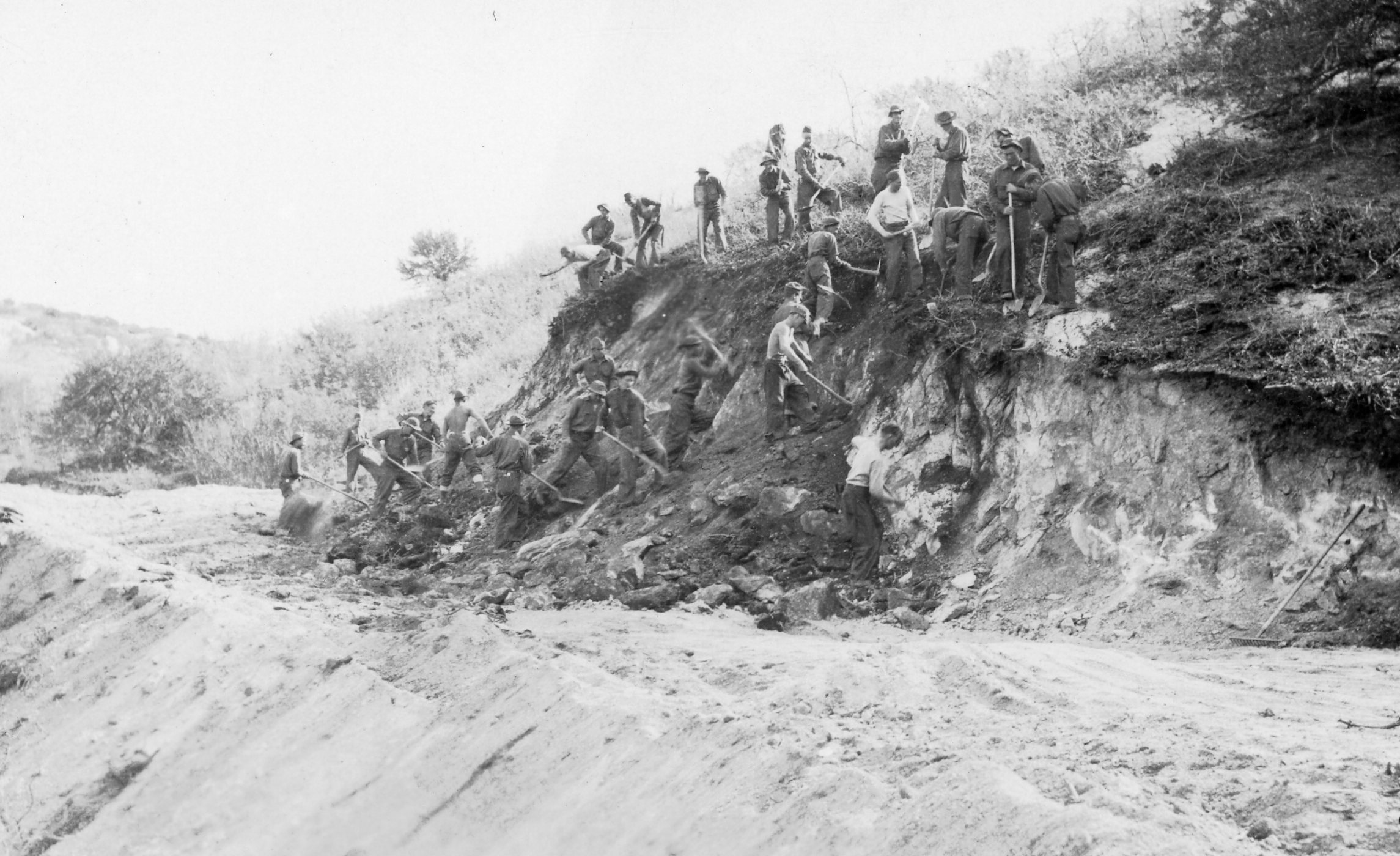
CCC workers with picks and shovels building a road in Utah between Milford and Beaver

The CCC performed 300 types of work projects in nine approved general classifications:

1. Structural improvements: bridges, fire lookout towers, service buildings
2. Transportation: truck trails, minor roads, foot trails and airfields
3. Erosion control: check dams, terracing, and vegetable covering
4. Flood control: irrigation, drainage, dams, ditching, channel work, riprapping
5. Forest culture: tree planting, fire prevention, fire pre-suppression, firefighting, insect and disease control
6. Landscape and recreation: public camp and picnic ground development, lake and pond site clearing and development
7. Range: stock driveways, elimination of predatory animals
8. Wildlife: stream improvement, fish stocking, food and cover planting
9. Miscellaneous: emergency work, surveys, mosquito control

The responses to this seven-month experimental conservation program were enthusiastic. On October 1, 1933, Director Fechner was directed to arrange for the second period of enrollment. By January 1934, 300,000 men were enrolled. In July 1934, this cap was increased by 50,000 to include men from Midwest states that had been affected by drought. The temporary tent camps had also developed to include wooden barracks. An education program had been established, emphasizing job training and literacy.

Approximately 55% of enrollees were from rural communities, a majority of which were non-farm; 45% came from urban areas. Level of education for the enrollee averaged 3% illiterate; 38% had less than eight years of school; 48% did not complete high school; and 11% were high school graduates. At the time of entry, 70% of enrollees were malnourished and poorly clothed. Few had work experience beyond occasional odd jobs. Peace was maintained by the threat of "dishonorable discharge". "This is a training station; we're going to leave morally and physically fit to lick 'Old Man Depression,'" boasted the newsletter, Happy Days, of a North Carolina camp.

=== African American people ===
Because of the power of conservative Solid South white Democrats in Congress, who insisted on racial segregation, most New Deal programs were racially segregated; African American and white people rarely worked alongside each other. At this time, all the states of the South had passed legislation imposing racial segregation and, since the turn of the century, laws and constitutional provisions that disenfranchised most African Americans; they were excluded from formal politics. Because of discrimination by white officials at the local and state levels, African Americans in the South did not receive as many benefits as white people from New Deal programs.

In the first few weeks of operation, CCC camps in the North were integrated. By July 1935, however, all camps in the United States were segregated. Enrollment peaked at the end of 1935, when there were 500,000 men in 2,600 camps in operation in every state. All received equal pay and housing. Black leaders lobbied to secure leadership roles. Adult white men held the major leadership roles in all the camps. Director Fechner refused to appoint Black adults to any supervisory positions except that of education director in the all-Black camps.

=== Indian Division ===
The CCC operated a separate division for members of federally recognized tribes: the "Indian Emergency Conservation Work Division" (IECW or CCC-ID). Native men from reservations worked on roads, bridges, clinics, shelters, and other public works near their reservations. Although they were organized as groups classified as camps, no permanent camps were established for Native Americans. Instead, organized groups moved with their families from project to project and were provided with an additional rental allowance. The CCC often provided the only paid work, as many reservations were in remote rural areas. Enrollees had to be between the ages of 17 and 35.

During 1933, about half the male heads of households on the Sioux reservations in South Dakota were employed by the CCC-ID. With grants from the Public Works Administration (PWA), the Indian Division built schools and conducted a road-building program in and around many reservations to improve infrastructure. The mission was to reduce erosion and improve the value of Indian lands. Crews built dams of many types on creeks, then sowed grass on the eroded areas from which the damming material had been taken. They built roads and planted shelter-belts on federal lands. The steady income helped participants regain self-respect, and many used the funds to improve their lives. John Collier, the federal Commissioner of Indian Affairs and Daniel Murphy, the director of the CCC-ID, both based the program on Indian self-rule and the restoration of tribal lands, governments, and cultures. The next year, Congress passed the Indian Reorganization Act of 1934, which ended allotments and helped preserve tribal lands, and encouraged tribes to re-establish self-government.

Collier said of the CCC-Indian Division, "no previous undertaking in Indian Service has so largely been the Indians' own undertaking". Educational programs trained participants in gardening, stock raising, safety, native arts, and some academic subjects. IECW differed from other CCC activities in that it explicitly trained men in skills to be carpenters, truck drivers, radio operators, mechanics, surveyors, and technicians. With the passage of the National Defense Vocational Training Act of 1941, enrollees began participating in defense-oriented training. The government paid for the classes and after students completed courses and passed a competency test, guaranteed automatic employment in defense work. A total of 85,000 Native Americans were enrolled in this training. This proved valuable social capital for the 24,000 alumni who later served in the military and the 40,000 who left the reservations for city jobs supporting the war effort.

=== Mexican Americans ===
Chicano American men experienced a lot of the same restrictions as the Native Americans while working in the Civilian Conservation Corps. They were categorized as neither black or white, so there is no official statistic on the population of Mexican American men that joined the CCC. Although they were allowed some of the privileges that their white counterparts held, Chicanos were not allowed to take up leadership positions and were made to complete more menial tasks alongside Black enrollees such as cooking, cleaning and maintenance. Many camps also enforced discriminatory policies against Spanish-speaking enrollees, including punishments for speaking Spanish and restrictions that reinforced pressure to assimilate into white American culture. Complaints from Chicano workers revealed widespread segregation in sleeping arrangements, work assignments, and social spaces. Chicano workers in Arizona and California reported harassment, physical assault, and unequal disciplinary treatment, especially in isolated rural camps where racial tensions were common.

Chicano youth played an important role in conservation efforts during the Great Depression by building trails, planting trees, and maintaining public lands. Their participation demonstrated that Mexican American communities were actively involved in early environmental and conservation movements, even while facing exclusion and racism within the CCC system.

=== Expansion, 1935–1936 ===
Responding to public demand to alleviate unemployment, Congress approved the Emergency Relief Appropriation Act of 1935, on April 8, 1935, which included continued funding for the CCC program through March 31, 1937. The age limit was expanded to 17–28 to include more men. April 1, 1935, to March 31, 1936, was the period of greatest activity and work accomplished by the CCC program. Enrollment peaked at 505,782 in about 2,900 camps by August 31, 1935, followed by a reduction to 350,000 enrollees in 2,019 camps by June 30, 1936. During this period the public response to the CCC program was overwhelmingly popular. A Gallup poll of April 18, 1936, asked: "Are you in favor of the CCC camps?"; 82% of respondents said "yes", including 92% of Democrats and 67% of Republicans.

=== Change of purpose, 1937–1938 ===
On June 28, 1937, the Civilian Conservation Corps was legally established and transferred from its original designation as the Emergency Conservation Work program. Funding was extended for three more years by Public Law No. 163, 75th Congress, effective July 1, 1937. Congress changed the age limits to 17–23 years old and changed the requirement that enrollees be on relief to "not regularly in attendance at school, or possessing full-time employment". The 1937 law mandated the inclusion of vocational and academic training for a minimum of 10 hours per week. Students in school were allowed to enroll during summer vacation. During this period, the CCC forces contributed to disaster relief following 1937 floods in New York, Vermont, and the Ohio and Mississippi river valleys, and response and clean-up after the 1938 hurricane in New England.

=== From conservation to defense, 1939–1940 ===
In 1939 Congress ended the independent status of the CCC, transferring it to the control of the Federal Security Agency. The National Youth Administration, U.S. Employment Service, the Office of Education, and the Works Progress Administration also had some responsibilities. About 5,000 reserve officers serving in the camps were affected, as they were transferred to federal Civil Service, and military ranks and titles were eliminated. Despite the loss of overt military leadership in the camps by July 1940, with war underway in Europe and Asia, the government directed an increasing number of CCC projects to resources for national defense. It developed infrastructure for military training facilities and forest protection. By 1940 the CCC was no longer wholly a relief agency, was rapidly losing its non-military character, and it was becoming a system for work-training, as its ranks had become increasingly younger and inexperienced.

=== Decline and disbandment 1941–1942 ===
Although the CCC was probably the most popular New Deal program, it never was authorized as a permanent agency. The program was reduced in scale as the Depression waned and employment opportunities improved. After conscription began in 1940, fewer eligible young men were available. Following the attack on Pearl Harbor in December 1941, the Roosevelt administration directed all federal programs to emphasize the war effort. Most CCC work, except for wildland firefighting, was shifted onto U.S. military bases to help with construction.

The CCC disbanded one year earlier than planned, as the 77th United States Congress ceased funding it. Operations were formally concluded at the end of the federal fiscal year on June 30, 1942. The end of the CCC program and closing of the camps involved arrangements to leave the incomplete work projects in the best possible state, the separation of about 1,800 appointed employees, the transfer of CCC property to the War and Navy Departments and other agencies, and the preparation of final accountability records. Liquidation of the CCC was ordered by Congress by the Labor-Federal Security Appropriation Act (56 Stat. 569) on July 2, 1942, and virtually completed on June 30, 1943. Liquidation appropriations for the CCC continued through April 20, 1948.

Some former CCC sites in good condition were reactivated from 1941 to 1947 as Civilian Public Service camps where conscientious objectors performed "work of national importance" as an alternative to military service. Other camps were used to hold Japanese, German and Italian Americans interned under the Western Defense Command's Enemy Alien Control Program, as well as Axis prisoners of war. Most of the Japanese American internment camps were built by the people held there. After the CCC disbanded, the federal agencies responsible for public lands organized their own seasonal fire crews, modeled after the CCC. These have performed a firefighting function formerly done by the CCC and provided the same sort of outdoor work experience for young people.

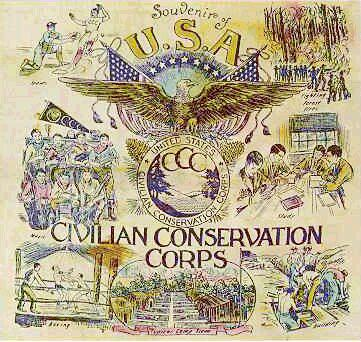
A CCC pillowcase on display at the CCC Museum in Michigan

== Impact on the environment ==
With over 3 billion trees planted the CCC was sometimes referred to as Roosevelt's "Tree Army," highlighting President Roosevelt's passion for environmental rehabilitation. In 1937, Acting Regional Forester Clarence Strong estimated that the CCC's efforts in Region 1, the northern U.S., had reduced timber losses from over 1 billion board feet before 1933 to about 80 million between 1933 and 1936. Hugh Hammond Bennett promoted new farming methods adopted with federal incentives, such as crop rotation, contour plowing, and terracing, while the Civilian Conservation Corps planted millions of trees to combat the effects of the Dust Bowl.

== Museums ==
- Civilian Conservation Corps Museum in Bunker Tower at Cheaha State Park, Alabama
- Civilian Conservation Corps Museum at DeSoto State Park, Fort Payne, Alabama
- Civilian Conservation Corps Museum and Memorial, at Monte Sano State Park, Huntsville, Alabama
- Colossal Cave Mountain Park, Vail, Arizona
- Conservation Corps State Museum at Camp San Luis Obispo, San Luis Obispo, California
- North East States Civilian Conservation Corps Museum, Camp Conner, Stafford, Connecticut
- Florida Civilian Conservation Corps Museum at Highlands Hammock State Park, Sebring, Florida
- Civilian Conservation Corps Museum, Vogel State Park, Blairsville, Georgia
- Civilian Conservation Corps Camp in Kokeʻe State Park, Waimea, Kauai County, Hawaii
- Starved Rock State Park (CCC Section in the visitors' center) Oglesby, Illinois
- Black Hawk State Historic Site, Rock Island, Illinois (The Refectory, located in the east end of Watch Tower Lodge houses a permanent exhibit on the Civilian Conservation Corps.)
- Iowa Civilian Conservation Corps Museum at Backbone State Park, Strawberry Point, Iowa
- Houghton's Pond, Blue Hills Reservation, Milton, Massachusetts
- Michigan Civilian Conservation Corps Museum, Roscommon, Michigan
- Bear Brook State Park Civilian Conservation Corps (CCC) Camp Historic District, Allenstown, New Hampshire
- New York State Civilian Conservation Corps Museum at Gilbert Lake State Park, New Lisbon, New York
- Masker Museum at Promised Land State Park, Greentown, Pennsylvania
- Lou and Helen Adams Civilian Conservation Corps Museum, Parker Dam State Park, Huston Township, Clearfield County, Pennsylvania
- Civilian Conservation Corps Museum at Lake Greenwood State Recreation Area, Ninety Six, South Carolina
- Civilian Conservation Corps Museum at Pocahontas State Park, Chesterfield, Virginia
- Civilian Conservation Corps Legacy, Edinburg, Virginia
- Civilian Conservation Corps Museum, Rhinelander, Wisconsin
- West Virginia CCC Museum, Harrison County, West Virginia
- Civilian Conservation Corps Museum, Guernsey State Park, Guernsey, Wyoming
- James F. Justin Civilian Conservation Corps Museum
- Civilian Conservation Corps History Center at the Minnesota Discovery Center Museum in Chisholm Minnesota

== Notable alumni and administrators ==
- David "Stringbean" Akeman, enrollee, country music singer
- Norman Borlaug, leader, agronomist, Nobel Peace Prize recipient
- Raymond Burr, enrollee, actor
- Borden Deal, enrollee
- Hutton Gibson, author
- Archie Green, enrollee, folklorist
- Henry Gurke, enrollee
- Ralph Hauenstein, Army officer in charge of camp
- Aldo Leopold, former technical forester, ecologist, environmentalist
- Stanley Makowski, enrollee
- Walter Matthau, enrollee, actor
- Robert Mitchum, enrollee, actor
- Archie Moore, enrollee, the Light Heavyweight Boxing Champion of the World
- Stan Musial, enrollee, professional baseball player
- Edward R. Roybal, enrollee, politician
- Red Schoendienst, enrollee, baseball player/manager
- Dan White, enrollee, American actor in vaudeville, theater, radio, film and television
- Conrad L. Wirth, U.S. administrator, National Park Service supervisor of CCC Program
- Chuck Yeager, enrollee, test pilot
- Alvin C. York, World War I Medal of Honour recipient, project superintendent

== Statues ==
Statue of CCC worker in Santa Fe, New Mexico

In several cities where CCC workers worked, statues were erected to commemorate them.

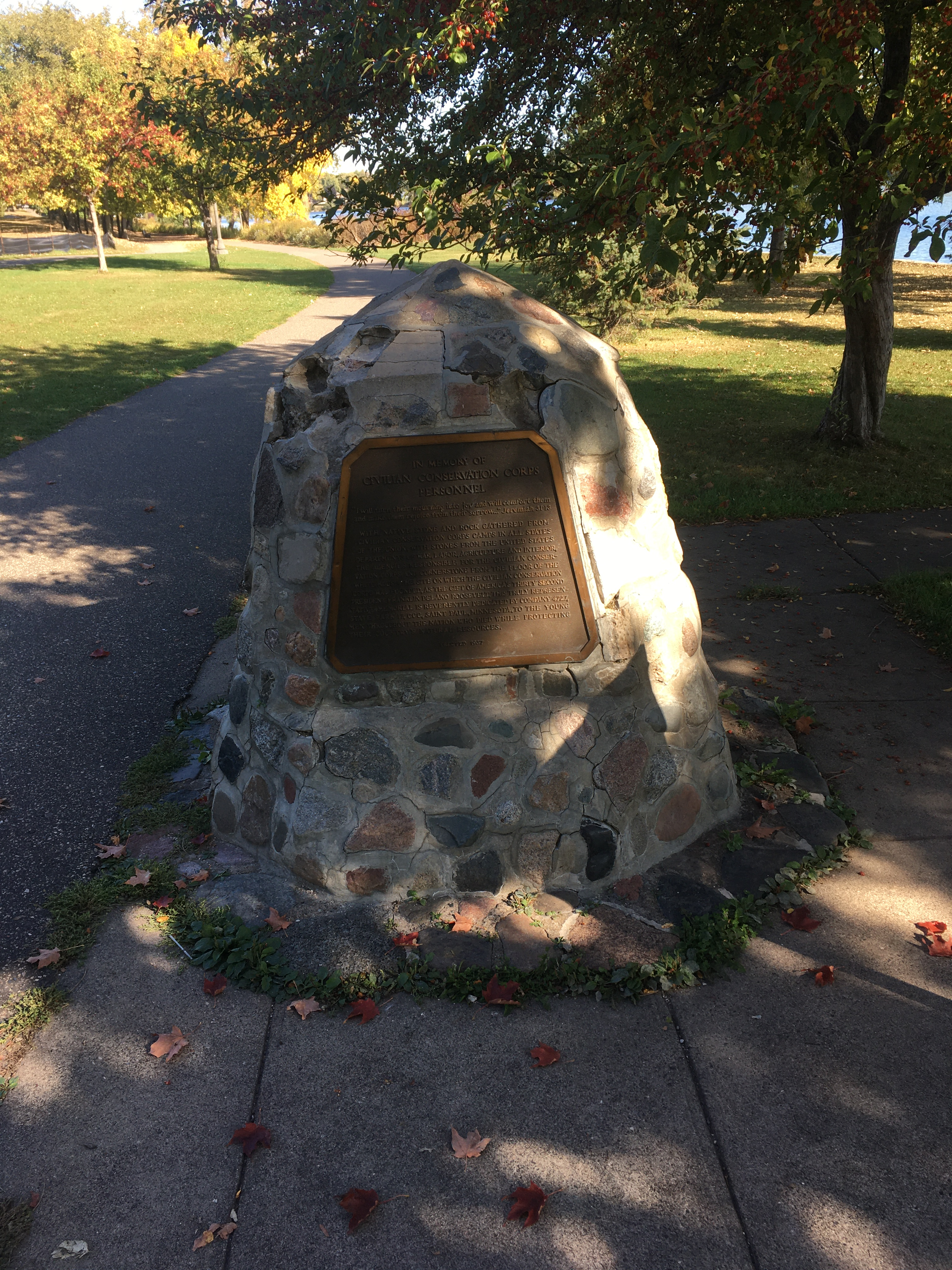
In Phalen Park, St. Paul Minnesota, the workers constructed a monument to commemorate their work on this site.

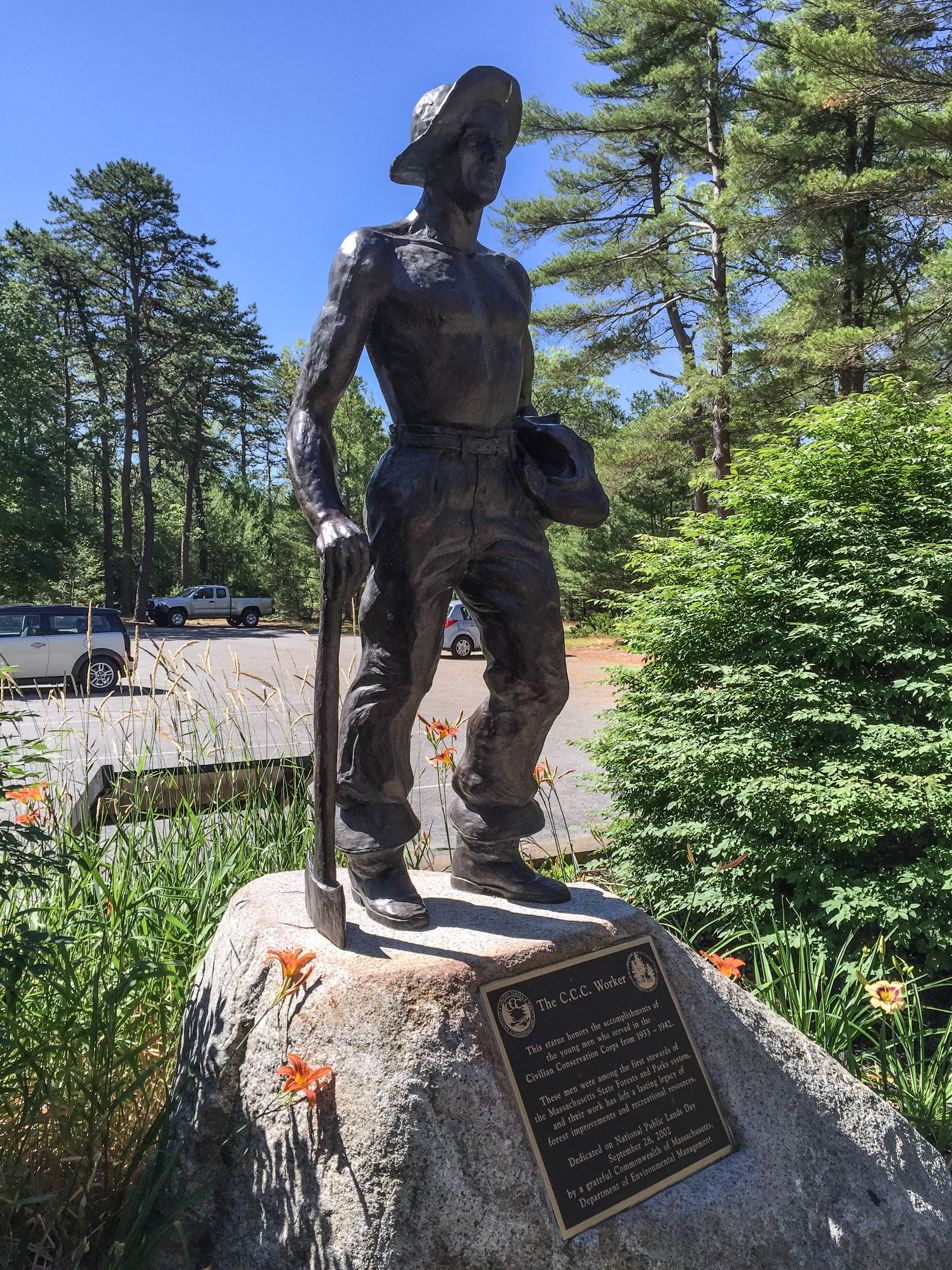
Statue of CCC worker in Freetown-Fall River State Forest Freetown, Massachusetts

== In media ==
- Pride of the Bowery (1940), the fourth movie in the East Side Kid series, is a movie about friendship, trouble, and boxing at a CCC camp.
- The American Experience PBS series showcased documentaries on American history; it portrayed the life in Civilian Conservation Corps in 2009, in the first episode of Season 22.
- Jeanette Ingold's novel Hitch (2012) is a young adult book about a teenager in the CCC.

== Inspired programs ==
The CCC program was never officially terminated. Congress provided funding for closing the remaining camps in 1942 with the equipment being reallocated. It became a model for conservation programs that were implemented in the period after World War II. Present-day corps are national, state, and local programs that engage primarily youth and young adults (ages 16–25) in community service, training, and educational activities. The nation's approximately 113 corps programs operate in 41 of the 50 states and Washington, D.C. During 2004, they enrolled more than 23,000 young people. The Corps Network, known originally as the National Association of Service and Conservation Corps (NASCC), works to expand and enhance corps-type programs throughout the country. The Corps Network began in 1985 when the nation's first 24 Corps directors banded together to secure an advocate at the federal level and a repository of information on how best to start and manage a corps. Early financial assistance from the Ford, Hewlett and Mott Foundations was critical to establishing the association.

Similar active programs in the United States are: the National Civilian Community Corps, part of the AmeriCorps program, a team-based national service program in which young adults ages 18–26 spend 10 months working for non-profit and government organizations; and the Civilian Conservation Corps, USA, (CCCUSA) managed by its president, Thomas Hark, in 2016. Hark, his co-founder Mike Rama, currently the Deputy Director of the Corporate Eco Forum (CEF) founded by M. R. Rangaswami, and their team of strategic advisors have reimagined the federal Civilian Conservation Corps program of the 1930s as a private, locally governed, national social franchise. The goal of this recently established CCCUSA is to enroll a million young people annually, building a core set of values in each enrollee, who will then become the catalyst in their own communities and states to create a more civil society and stronger nation.

=== Student Conservation Association ===
The CCC program became a model for the creation of team-based national service youth conservation programs such as the Student Conservation Association (SCA). The SCA, founded in 1959, is a nonprofit organization that offers conservation internships and summer trail crew opportunities to more than 4,000 people each year.

=== California Conservation Corps ===
In 1976, Governor of California Jerry Brown established the California Conservation Corps. This program had many similar characteristics - residential centers, high expectations for participation, and emphasis on hard work on public lands. Young adults from different backgrounds were recruited for a term of one year. Corps members attended a training session called the Corpsmember Orientation Motivation Education and Training (COMET) program before being assigned to one of the various centers. Project work is also similar to the original CCC of the 1930s - work on public forests, state and federal parks.

=== Nevada Conservation Corps ===
The Nevada Conservation Corps is a non-profit organization that partners with public land management agencies such as the Bureau of Land Management, United States Forest Service, National Park Service, and Nevada State Parks to complete conservation and restoration projects throughout Nevada. Conservation work includes fuel reductions through thinning, constructing and maintaining trails, invasive species removal, and performing biological surveys. The Nevada Conservation Corps was created through the Great Basin Institute and is part of the AmeriCorps program.

=== Minnesota Conservation Corps ===
Conservation Corps Minnesota & Iowa provides environmental stewardship and service-learning opportunities to youth and young adults while accomplishing conservation, natural resource management projects and emergency response work through its Young Adult Program and the Summer Youth Program. These programs emphasize the development of job and life skills by conservation and community service work.

=== Montana Conservation Corps ===
The Montana Conservation Corps (MCC) is a non-profit organization with a mission to equip young people with the skills and values to be vigorous citizens who improve their communities and environment. Collectively, MCC crews contribute more than 90,000 work hours each year. The MCC was established in 1991 by Montana's Human Resource Development Councils in Billings, Bozeman and Kalispell. Originally, it was a summer program for disadvantaged youth, although it has grown into an AmeriCorps-sponsored non-profit organization with six regional offices that serve Montana, Idaho, Wyoming, North Dakota, and South Dakota. All regions also offer Montana YES (Youth Engaged in Service) summer programs for teenagers who are 14 to 17 years old.

=== Texas Conservation Corps ===
Established in 1995, Environmental Corps, now Texas Conservation Corps (TxCC), is an American YouthWorks program which allows youth, ages 17 to 28, to contribute to the restoration and preservation of parks and public lands in Texas. The only conservation corps in Texas, TxcC is a nonprofit corporation based in Austin, Texas, which serves the entire state. Their work ranges from disaster relief to trail building to habitat restoration. TxCC has done projects in national, state, and city parks.

=== Washington Conservation Corps ===
The Washington Conservation Corps (WCC) is a sub-agency of the Washington State Department of Ecology. It employs men and women 18 to 25 years old in a program to protect and enhance Washington's natural resources. WCC is a part of the AmeriCorps program.

=== Vermont Youth Conservation Corps ===
The Vermont Youth Conservation Corps (VYCC) is a non-profit, youth service and education organization that hires Corps Members, aged 16–24, to work on high-priority conservation projects in Vermont. Through these work projects, Corps Members develop a strong work ethic, strengthen their leadership skills, and learn how to take personal responsibility for their actions. VYCC Crews work at VT State Parks, U.S. Forest Service Campgrounds, in local communities, and throughout the state's backcountry. The VYCC has also given aid to a similar program in North Carolina, which is currently in its infancy.

=== Youth Conservation Corps ===
The Youth Conservation Corps is a youth conservation program present in federal lands around the country. The program gives youth aged 15–18 the opportunity to participate in conservation projects in a team setting. YCC programs are available in land managed by the National Park Service, the Forest Service, and the Fish and Wildlife Service. Projects can last up to 10 weeks and typically run over the summer. Some YCC programs are residential, meaning the participants are given housing on the land they work on. Projects may necessitate youth to camp in backcountry settings in order to work on trails or campsites. Most require youth to commute daily or house youth for only a few days a week. Youth are typically paid for their work. YCC programs contribute to the maintenance of public lands and instill a value for hard work and the outdoors in those who participate.

=== Conservation Legacy ===
Conservation Legacy is a non-profit employment, job training, and education organization with locations across the United States including Arizona Conservation Corps in Tucson and Flagstaff, Arizona; Conservation Corps New Mexico in Las Cruces, New Mexico; Southwest Conservation Corps in Durango and Salida, Colorado; and Southeast Conservation Corps in Chattanooga, Tennessee. Conservation Legacy also operates an AmeriCorps VISTA team serving to improve the environment and economies of historic mining communities in the American West and Appalachia. Conservation Legacy also hosts the Environmental Stewards Program - providing internships with federal, state, municipal and NGO land management agencies nationwide. Conservation Legacy formed as a merger of the Southwest Youth Corps, San Luis Valley Youth Corps, The Youth Corps of Southern Arizona, and Coconino Rural Environmental Corps.

Conservation Legacy engages young adults ages 14 to 26 and U.S. military veterans of all ages in personal and professional development experiences involving conservation projects on public lands. Corp members live, work, and learn in teams of six to eight for terms of service ranging from 3 months to 1 year.

=== Sea Ranger Service ===
The Sea Ranger Service is a social enterprise, based in Netherlands, that has taken its inspiration from the Civilian Conservation Corps in running a permanent youth training program, supported by veterans, to manage ocean areas and carry out underwater landscape restoration. Unemployed youths are trained up as Sea Rangers during a bootcamp and subsequently offered full-time employment to manage and regenerate Marine Protected Areas and aid ocean conservation. The Sea Ranger Service works in close cooperation with the Dutch government and national maritime authorities.

=== Aina Corps ===
The Aina Corps performed environmental restoration work in Hawaii in 2020, funded by the CARES Act.

=== American Climate Corps ===
The American Climate Corps is an organization created by the Joe Biden administration. It was inspired by the Civilian Conservation Corps and aims to mobilize young people to stop climate change, while giving them a job at the same time. It is financed from the Inflation Reduction Act and the federal budget. It should have 9,000 members by the end of June 2024. Later, the number of participants should rise to 20,000.

== See also ==
- List of Civilian Conservation Corps camps
- She-She-She Camps
