= Yvon Le Corre =

French painter, educator, and navigator (1939–2020)

- Born: 7 October 1939; Saint-Brieuc, France
- Died: 25 August 2020 (aged 80); Tréguier, France
- Occupations: Painter; Educator; Navigator

Yvon Le Corre (7 October 1939 – 25 August 2020) was a French painter, educator, and navigator. He was also the author of several books and stories.

== Biography ==
Le Corre served as a professor in Marseille, where he instructed Titouan Lamazou and inspired his passion for sailing and travel sketches. Le Corre's expeditions led him to Ireland, Morocco, Portugal, Brazil, Mauritania, and Antarctica. He sailed on traditional wooden boats.

Le Corre was twice offered to be Peintre de la Marine, which he declined. He also declined membership in the Ordre des Arts et des Lettres. He released L'Ivre de mer, a sketch dedicated to his voyages in the numerous ports of Brittany. He won the Prix Mémoires de la mer of the Académie de Marine on 8 March 2012 for this work.

Le Corre lived and worked in Tréguier. He owned the English shipliner Girl Joyce, a 150-year-old rig which he restored himself.

== Works ==
- Heureux qui comme Iris (1978)
- Carnet d'Irlande (1987)
- Les Tavernes d'Alcina (1990)
- Antarctide (1992)
- Irlande. Les Demeures du grand souffle (1994)
- Carnets du littoral. Le Cap Sizun. (1997)
- Les Outils de la Passion (1998)
- Mali Mélo (2000)
- Madagascar, ma terre oubliée (2001)
- Taïeb, une rencontre au désert (2002)
- L'Ivre de mer (2011)
- Azouyadé (2015)
