= Corium =

Corium may refer to:

- Corium, Latin term for the dermis, a skin layer
- Corium (Crete), a town of ancient Crete, Greece
- Corium (entomology), the thickened leathery, basal portion of an insect forewing (hemelytron).
- Corium (moth), an insect genus
- Corium (nuclear reactor), the lava-like amalgamation of reactor core materials and components resulting from a meltdown
  - Elephant's Foot (Chernobyl), nickname given to a large mass of corium formed underneath the Chernobyl Nuclear Power Plant

== See also ==
- Coria (disambiguation)
