= Coria (surname) =

Coria is a surname. Notable people with the surname include:

- Adrián Coria (football manager) (born 1959), Argentine football manager
- Adrián Coria (footballer) (born 1977), Argentine footballer
- Enrique Coria, Argentine classical guitarist
- Facundo Coria (born 1987), Argentine footballer
- Federico Coria (born 1992), Argentine tennis player
- Francisco Coria Marchetti (born 2000), Argentine rugby player
- Franco Coria (born 1988), Argentine footballer
- Gabino Coria Peñaloza (1881–1975), Argentine poet and lyricist
- Guillermo Coria (born 1982), Argentine tennis player
- Hugo Coria (born 1961), Argentine footballer and manager
- Miguel Ángel Coria (1937–2016), Spanish classical composer
- Rodolfo Coria (born 1959), Argentine paleontologist
- Valentin Fernández Coria (1886–1954), Argentine chess player
