= Cores (film) =

2012 film directed by Francisco Garcia

- Directed by: Francisco Garcia
- Written by: Francisco Garcia; Gabriel Campos
- Produced by: André Gevaerd; Sara Silveira
- Starring: Acauã Sol; Simone Iliescu; Pedro di Pietro
- Cinematography: Alziro Barbosa
- Edited by: André Gevaerd
- Music by: Wilson Sukorski
- Production companies: Kinoosfera Filmes; Dezenove Som e Imagens
- Distributed by: Pandora Filmes
- Release dates: September 27, 2012 (SSIFF); May 10, 2013 (Brazil)
- Running time: 95 minutes
- Country: Brazil
- Language: Portuguese

Cores (Portuguese for "Colors") is a 2012 Brazilian drama film that was released on May 10, 2013. It is the debut film of director Francisco Garcia, who also wrote the script together with Gabriel Campos.

The film was premiered at the 60th San Sebastián International Film Festival in 2012, and was also screened at the 36th São Paulo International Film Festival.

== Plot ==
The film follows the story of the friendship among three young friends in a metropolis. Luca is a tattoo artist who lives with his grandmother. He keeps a tattoo studio in the back of the house, in a peripheral district of São Paulo. Luiz lives in a pension in the downtown city, he spends the day between small jobs that he manages with his bike and working in a drugstore. Luara, his girlfriend, is a girl who lives in an apartment in front of the airport and works in an ornamental fish shop, while dreaming of traveling abroad. The life of these three friends are marked by an ordinary routine, in which the lack of perspective prevails.

== Cast ==
- Maria Célia Camargo
- Graça De Andrade
- Pedro di Pietro
- Simone Iliesco
- Guilherme Leme
- Tonico Pereira
- Acauã Sol
