= National Association of Service and Conservation Corps =

The National Association of Service and Conservation Corps (NASCC), now known as The Corps Network, is an association of Service and Conservation Corps in the United States.

It took shape in 1985, when the nation's first 24 Corps directors banded together to secure an advocate at the Federal level and a central clearinghouse of information on how to start and run "best practice"-based corps. Early support from the Ford, Hewlett and Mott Foundations was critical to launching the Association. The Corps Network has grown to encompass 143 Corps programs, both urban and rural, and has assisted in the birth of virtually all of these Corps. The Corps Network is governed by a board of directors composed of Corps program directors and nationally known individuals who bring expertise in national service, evaluation, youth development, education, conservation and employment and training.

Currently operating in 44 states and Washington, D.C., Corps annually enroll more than 29,000 young men and women who annually mobilize approximately 227,000 community volunteers who in conjunction with Corpsmembers generate 21.3 million hours of service every year.

Service and Conservation Corps are a direct descendant of the Civilian Conservation Corps (CCC) that built parks and other public facilities still in use today. Like the legendary CCC of the 1930s, today's Corps are a proven strategy for giving young men and women the chance to change their communities, their own lives and those of their families. Service and Conservation Corps provide a wealth of valuable conservation, infrastructure improvement and human service projects. Some Corps tutor and some fight forest fires. Others complete a wide range of projects on public lands. Still others improve the quality of life in low-income communities by renovating deteriorated housing, engaging in environmental restoration, creating parks and gardens and staffing after-school programs.
