= Nucleus (order theory) =

In mathematics, and especially in order theory, a nucleus is a function $F$ on a meet-semilattice $\mathfrak{A}$ such that (for every $p$ in $\mathfrak{A}$):

1. $p \le F(p)$
2. $F(F(p)) = F(p)$
3. $F(p \wedge q) = F(p) \wedge F(q)$

Every nucleus is evidently a monotone function.

== Frames and locales ==
Usually, the term nucleus is used in pointless topology (when the semilattice $\mathfrak{A}$ is a frame).

Proposition: If $F$ is a nucleus on a frame $\mathfrak{A}$, then the poset $\operatorname{Fix} F$ of fixed points of $F$, with order inherited from $\mathfrak{A}$, is also a frame.
