= René Le Corre =

French poet (1923–2021)

- Born: 12 March 1923; Pouldreuzic, France
- Died: 5 May 2021 (aged 98); Pouldreuzic, France
- Occupation: Poet

René Le Corre (12 March 1923 – 5 May 2021) was a French poet.

A professor of philosophy, he published numerous poems. He was a member of Les Plumes du paon, which sought to promote literature from Bigouden.

== Works ==
- Bretagne, le clos et l'ouvert (1982)
- Pourquoi la mer ? (1984)
- Couleur du temps (1985)
- Livre de chevet des hommes et des femmes du xxie siècle (1995)
- L’Ombre bleue (1996)
- L'Inespéré (2007)
- Les saisons (2011)
- Un monde de rosée (2017)
