= Pascal Le Corre =

French pianist, teacher and author

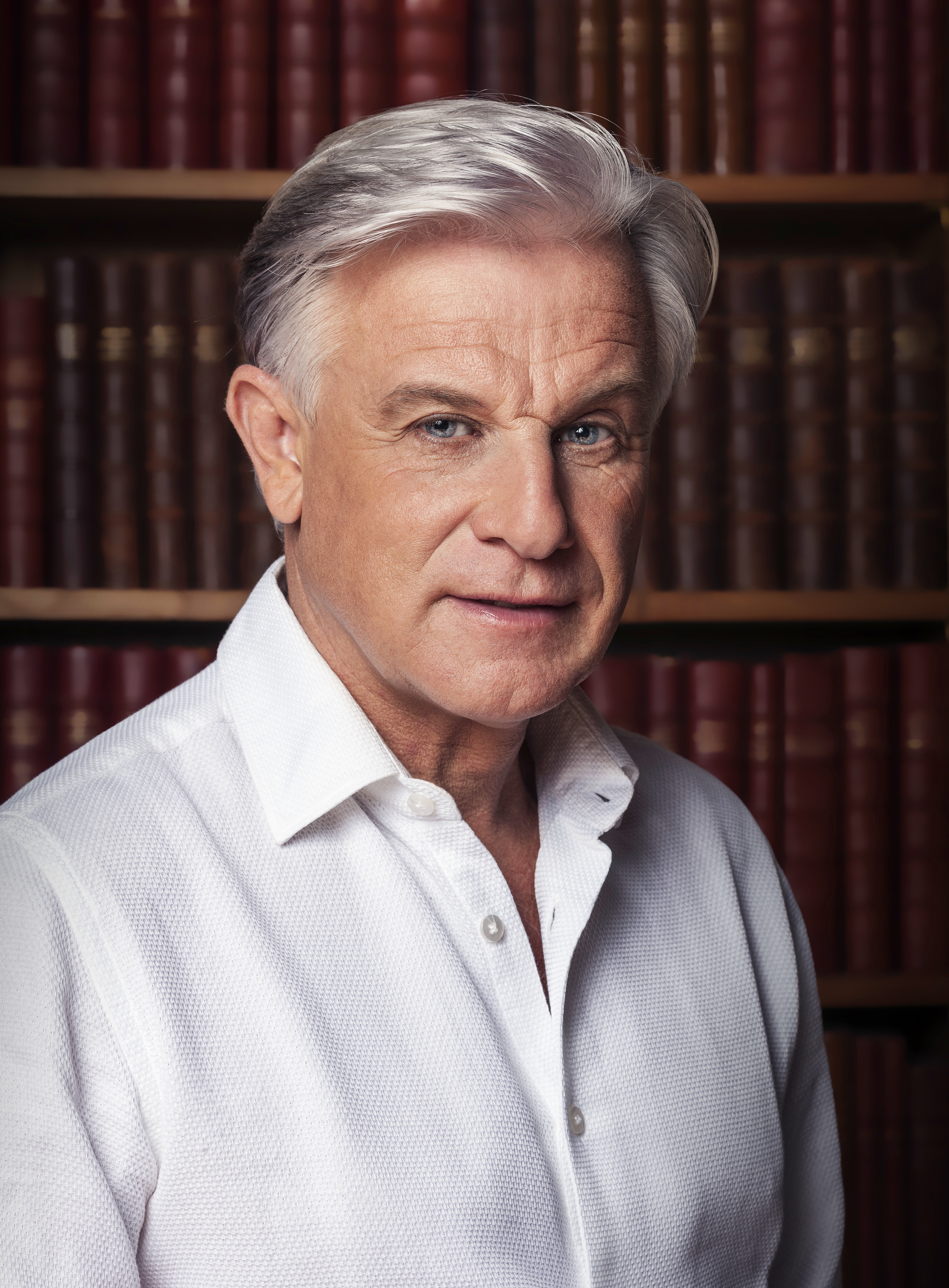
Pascal Le Corre in 2016

Pascal Le Corre (born 1959) is a French classical pianist, teacher and author

== Life ==
Pascal Le Corre studied the piano at the Conservatoire de Paris with Pierre Audon and Aldo Ciccolini (about whom he wrote the book Aldo Ciccolini. Je suis un lirico spinto...), chamber music with Jean Hubeau, musical analysis with Betsy Jolas, piano accompaniment with Jean Koerner and instrumentation with Marius Constant. He won prizes at the 1984 "Maria Callas international piano competition" in Barcelona and was a scholarship holder of the Yehudi-Menuhin- and the Georges-Cziffra-Foundation and the Action Musicale Philip Morris and obtained the teaching master for piano, piano accompaniment and chamber music.

As a pianist, Le Corre has performed primarily in Europe, the US and Japan. He worked with the Orchestre Lamoureux and the Concerts Orchestre, the Ensemble Orchestral de Paris and the Orchestre de Paris. In addition to Beethoven's, Mozart's und Liszt's works, his repertoire includes the compositions of 20th century composers such as Francis Poulenc, Eric Satie, Tōru Takemitsu, Heitor Villa-Lobos and Stavros Xarchakos. On record he played among others, piano works by Florent Schmitt, compositions for violin and piano by Karol Szymanowski (with Annick Roussin) and the piano version of Claude Debussy's opera Pelléas et Mélisande.

From 1983, Le Corre was professor for piano accompaniment at the Conservatory of Amiens. In 1986 he became assistant in Jean-Claude Pennetier's piano class at the Conservatoire de Paris. He is now head of studies and chamber music teacher in the CRR and PSPBB of Paris
