= DataSpring =

American non-profit organization

- Abbreviation: CAQH
- Founded: July 22, 1998; 28 years ago
- Legal status: non-profit mutual benefit corporation
- Purpose: Health care, information technology
- Headquarters: Washington, D.C.
- Services: CAQH CORE; CAQH Solutions; CAQH Insights
- CEO: Sarah Ahmad
- Website: www.dataspring.com
- Remarks: $42.2 million in assets (2017)

The Council for Affordable Quality Healthcare, Inc. (CAQH), now known as DataSpring, is a non-profit organization incorporated in California as a mutual benefit corporation. CAQH has since been merged into a Delaware corporation of the same name. It was first incorporated under the name Coalition for Affordable, Quality Healthcare, Inc., and then renamed the Council for Affordable Quality Healthcare, Inc. on August 8, 2002. It is based in Washington, D.C.

CAQH was formed by a number of health insurance companies with the goal of creating a forum for healthcare industry stakeholders to discuss administrative burdens for physicians, patients, and payers.

== Membership ==
Members include Aetna, Anthem, America's Health Insurance Plans, AultCare, the BlueCross BlueShield Association, Blue Cross Blue Shield of Michigan, BlueCross BlueShield of North Carolina, BlueCross BlueShield of Tennessee, CareFirst BlueCross BlueShield, Centene Corporation, Cigna, Horizon Blue Cross Blue Shield of New Jersey, Humana, Kaiser Permanente and UnitedHealth Group.
