= 1924 24 Hours of Le Mans =

2nd 24 Hours of Le Mans endurance race

Previous: 1923	Next: 1925
Index: Races | Winners

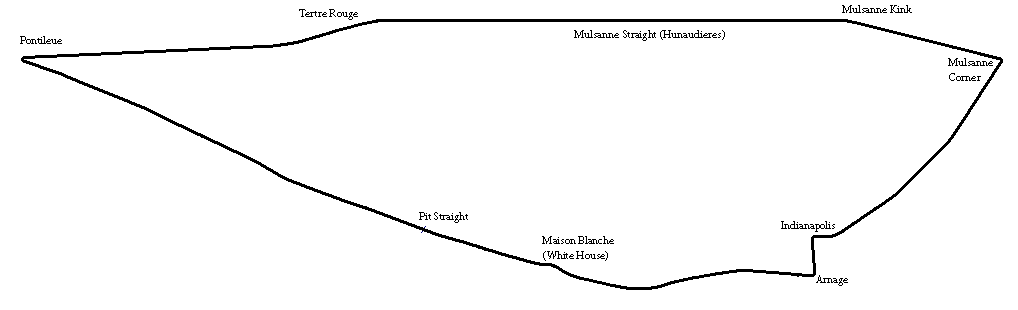
Le Mans in 1924

The 1924 24 Hours of Le Mans was the 2nd Grand Prix of Endurance, and took place on 14 and 15 June 1924. It was the second part of three consecutive annual races for the Rudge-Whitworth Triennial Cup, as well simultaneously being the first race in the new 1924-25 Rudge-Whitworth Biennial Cup.

With tougher target distances, as well as hot weather, the cars had to be pushed harder and this year only 12 of the 41 starters completed the 24 hours. The 4-litre Chenard-Walcker of the 1923 winners René Léonard and André Lagache had the early lead, for the first three hours, until it caught fire on the Mulsanne Straight. Thereafter it was a battle between the three-car Lorraine-Dietrich team and the British Bentley.

The first Lorraine-Dietrich had been delayed on Saturday night, the second went off the road during the night and the third was held up with two punctures then a blown engine trying to make up the lost time. The Bentley also had its problems but with two hours to go it had a significant lead when it pitted for a precautionary wheel-change. This soon became a big problem as one wheel could not be taken off and half an hour was lost. The delay meant its remaining laps would not be counted according to the new race-regulations, as the average speed would be below that achieved to reach their target distance. Although the remaining two Lorraines pushed hard they fell just one lap short.

The Bentley victory brought international acclaim and cemented the popularity of the race as a significant European event.

== Regulations ==
After the success of their inaugural 24-hour event, the Automobile Club de l'Ouest (ACO) set about making further improvements. Firstly, the race-timing was moved to the summer solstice in late June to make the best use of the extended daylight as well as the higher probability of better weather. The ACO also recognised that the Triennial Cup format was unworkable after an unexpectedly large number of cars had qualified from the year before. The current trophy stayed active, but not renewed. Émile Coquille, co-organiser and representative of the sponsor Rudge-Whitworth was still keen on a multi-year format, so a compromise Biennial Cup was initiated instead. Teams had to nominate which of their cars would compete for the Triennial Cup, while all entries were eligible for the Biennial Cup.

Specifications were tightened up on chassis features like windshields, running boards and seats to prevent abuse by manufacturers trying to save weight. It became compulsory to carry one spare wheel on board, exhausts had to be aligned to not blow dust off the road, and cars had to have functioning headlights between designated hours of darkness (8.30pm to 4am). In the original interests of furthering the advance of touring-car technology, convertibles had to come in after 5 laps and put up their hoods. Then after running for at least two laps with hoods up, they would come in and have them officially checked for robustness before dropping them back down. Failure would result in disqualification. Finally, the car companies also had to present written evidence of the requisite 30 production examples.

In the interests of driver safety, protective headgear now had to be worn. A minimum of 20 laps had to be driven before a car could stop to replenish fuel, water or oil fluids, still done solely by the driver. Cars did not need to complete the final lap at the end of the 24 hours if they had met their target distance, but any extra laps had to be done at or above the average speed of the rest of their race to be counted. After the lenient minimum target distances of the previous year, these were lifted significantly particularly for the smaller engined cars The distances included the following:

Engine size	1923 Minimum laps	1924 Minimum laps	Required average speed
3500cc	82	119	85.6 km/h
3000cc	79	115	82.7 km/h
2000cc	70	102	73.4 km/h
1500cc	63	93	66.9 km/h
1100cc	52	85	61.1 km/h

== The Track ==
Once again, an effort was made to apply a temporary mixture of gravel, dirt and tar to the road surface in spring-time. A third layer was put down on the long Hunaudières straight from Le Mans city to Mulsanne (more commonly known as the Mulsanne Straight).

For the spectators, further efforts were made to provide entertainment through the event. As well as the cafés and jazz-band, a new dance-hall, a boxing ring and a chapel were built. The first campsite area was also designated for people to stay on-site overnight.

== Entries ==
There were 30 finishers from the 1923 eligible for entry in the race, but only 21 were taken up. Six of the eleven manufacturers did not return, however another six French manufacturers stepped in to fill their places, leaving Bentley as the only foreign entry. Sunbeam had put in an entry, but withdrew it later to focus on the French Grand Prix racing.

Category	Entries	Classes
Very large engines	5	over 3-litre
Large-sized engines	7	2 to 3-litre
Medium-sized engines	13	1.5 to 2-litre
Small-sized engines	16	up to 1.5-litre
Total entrants	41	

After a winning debut in the 1923 race, Chenard-Walcker returned with a big team of six cars. The biggest car in the field was a 4-litre, rated at 22CV and built by effectively putting two 2-litre engines end to end. It delivered about 125 bhp giving a claimed 170 kp/h (105 mph) top speed. It was given to the previous year's winners René Léonard and André Lagache. A 3-litre 15CV, similar to the successful 1923 models was raced by the two Bachmann brothers, Raoul and Fernand. For the Triennial Cup, the team entered its smaller cars: a pair of the Type TT 12CV 2-litres as well as one of the two new Type Y 1.5-litre cars present.

After being initially sceptical the previous year, W. O. Bentley was now a firm convert, and offered to provide John Duff full factory support for a return to Le Mans. Learning from the previous year, his new Bentley 3 Litre now had four-wheel brakes, and wire mesh put over the headlights and matting wrapped the fuel tank – both measures put in to reduce potential damage from flying stones. The durable Rapson tyres were employed again on the Rudge-Whitworth wheels. Duff also advised changes to make mechanical fixes quicker during the race and recommended some team members be stationed at Mulsanne corner with a telephone so he could signal if he was going to be pitting at the end of the lap. He also did extensive practise putting up and taking down the hood.

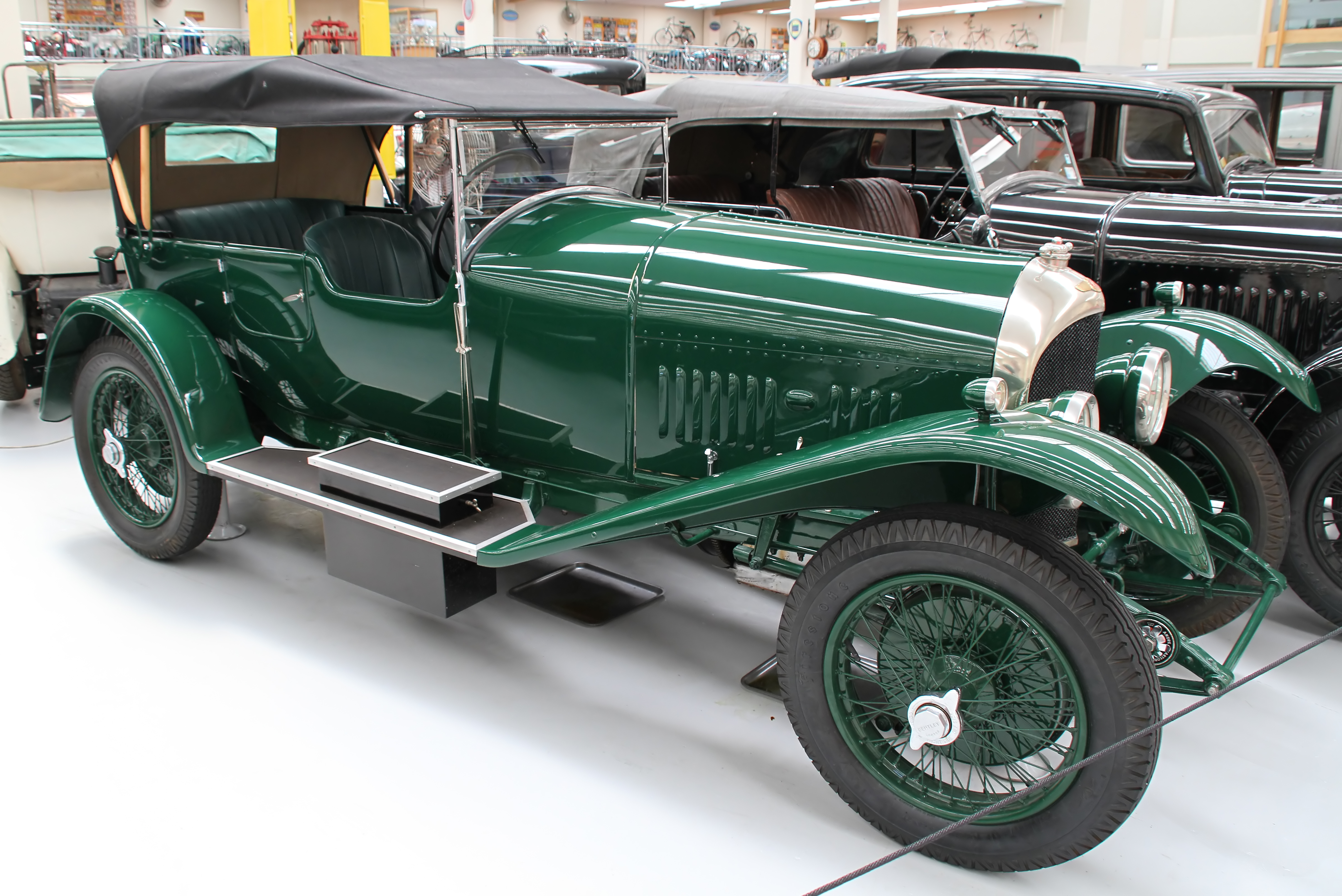
Bentley 3-Litre tourer

A new range of the La Lorraine-Dietrich B3-6 3.5-litre cars were unveiled at the end of 1923, including a Sport version deliberately built for racing. Now with a 4-speed gearbox, the new engine put out 115 bhp, getting the car up to 145 kp/h (90 mph). Three cars were entered, two running on Michelin tyres and the other on Englebert.

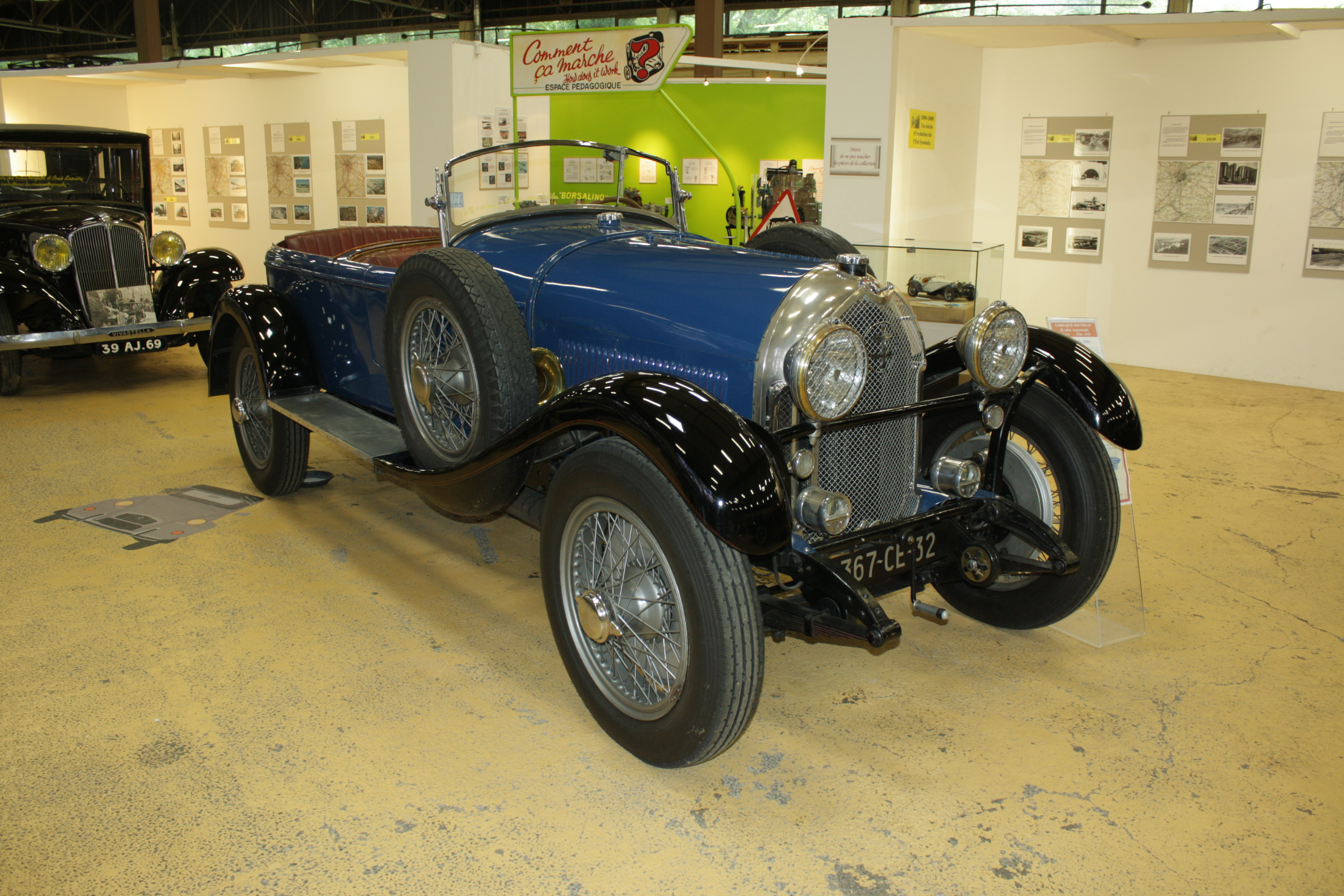
Lorraine Dietrich B3 6 Sport

Bignan doubled its team this year to four cars with their distinctive triple headlights. The new 3-litre engine was powerful, putting out 124 bhp and the 2-litre cars were new models, without the expensive “Desmo-chromique”engine. The team had already done well, winning the first post-war Monte Carlo Rally and setting 24-hour endurance records on the new Montlhéry circuit.

Ariès was a new entrant this year and arrived with four cars. It was founded in 1903 by former Panhard et Levassor engineer Baron Charles Petiet and had competed in the early inter-city races. Two shortened GP versions of the standard Type S were prepared, one with a 3.2-litre and the other with a 3-litre engine. There were also two 1100cc cars entered: an older CC2 and a new CC4 4-seater. Getting back into post-war racing in 1924 Petiet assembled a team of well-known drivers. Fernand Gabriel was leading the ill-fated 1903 Paris-Madrid race when it was stopped. Arthur Duray had set land speed records before the war and finished second in the 1914 Indianapolis 500 behind René Thomas. Robert Laly had been Thomas’ riding mechanic in the same race.

Rolland-Pilain again had four cars entered. The latest C23 version had a 2-litre engine capable of 50 bhp and 120 kp/h (75 mph). For the race the company entered lengthened four-seat tourer versions. Brasier returned with another pair of its 2.1-litre TB4 model with its 4-speed gearbox. Charles Montier also returned with his modified Ford special, now fitted with 4-wheel brakes. Again Montier drove it himself with his brother-in-law Albert Ouriou.

Oméga-Six was another new entrant this year. A venture founded in 1922 by Gabriel Daubech, who had made his money in timber. He wanted to get into the mid-range car market with a new option – a high-end 6-cylinder. The cars had a torpédo bodystyle, 4-speed gearbox with a 2-litre engine produced 50 bhp capable of 120 kp/h (75 mph). Louis Chenard (unrelated to Chenard-Walcker) had a small self-named Parisian car-factory. He ran one of his torpedo-style Type E tourers having a 1.2-litre Chapuis-Dornier engine, with his brother Émile. Likewise Georges and René Pol, who made taxis and delivery vans, wanted to venture into the sports car field. So they built a simple 1.7-litre car, named the GRP, and entered it into the race.

Georges Irat arrived with a “Compétition Spéciale” version of the 4A. With a higher-revving 2-litre engine that put out 60 bhp getting it up to 135 kp/h (85 mph). This year Corre La Licorne had three of its new model, the Type V16, now with a 10CV 1.5-litre SCAP engine. The “boat-tail” chassis had a 4-speed gearbox and 4-wheel brakes. New entry Alba also used the 1.5-litre SCAP engine, and also had its patented servo-less four-wheel braking also used by the Citroën Type C.

SARA had three of its ATS 2-seater model, one entered in the Triennial Cup and the other two in the Biennial Cup. This year Amilcar brought two cars – the same privately owned CV that had done well the previous year, and a new Type C Grans Sport. Its 1074cc engine produced 33 bhp and was driven by works drivers André Morel and Marius Mestivier. Majola had been racing cycle-cars after the war, but arrived at Le Mans with a bigger 1.1-litre 7CV 4-seater tourer.

== Practice ==
Once again, with no official practice session, several teams arrived earlier in the week before the scrutineering on Friday to do some practice laps. However, Maurice Rost crashed his Georges Irat and it could not be repaired in time to take the start.

== Race ==
=== Start ===
The ACO were vindicated for changing the event date, with hot, dry weather over race-week. This carried on into the weekend and dust would prove to be the issue this year. Rudge-Whitworth representative Émile Coquille was the official starter this year. Last away was Charles Montier whose Ford Special proved temperamental to start. At the end of the first lap, it was the 3-litre Bignans of de Marne and Ledure with Lagache's big 4-litre Chenard-Walcker between them setting the pace.

Straight away, de Marne easily beat Clement's lap record from the previous year by 15 seconds. Then after five laps, the convertibles had to come in to do their compulsory raising of the hood. Lagache almost missed his pit signal, having to brake heavily and reverse 100 metres to his pit spot. Duff's practicing paid off as he only took 40 seconds to put his up. But fastest of all were Montier and Lucien Erb, in his SARA, who only took 27 seconds.

But many cars were already in the pits early. Two of the Corre-La Licornes, an Alba and Duray's Ariès had already retired with engine troubles. The Bachmann's Chenard-Walcker caught fire while in the pits, the two Oméga-Six then retired as did the leading Bignans, suffering from overheating. De Marne was disqualified when he refilled water too early after the radiator plug came loose. Louis Chenard's only appearance at Le Mans also ended early when a stone through the radiator stopped it seven laps before the 20-lap replenishment point. Duff came in to refuel but was warned by an official he had only done 19 laps. Fortunately, the Bentley still had enough to complete one further lap and avoid disqualification. But the Rolland-Pilain team was in even direr straits – they had fitted their cars with fuel tanks that were too small. De Marguenat ran out of fuel after 18 laps, and the others (after being frantically told to slow down) only just made their first stop. Thereafter the cars had to be driven very conservatively to make it through to each stop. Marinier miscalculated and ran out of fuel on Sunday morning, but the other cars survived and, from not having been driven hard, ran well and still exceeded their race targets.

So, without close pursuit, Lagache was able to set about building a sizeable lead, while lowering the lap record even further. At the 3-hour mark he was leading from Laly's Ariès, the Lorraine triad, the Georges-Irat then Duff in the Bentley. Then at 8pm as dusk fell, soon after Léonard took over the leading car, the big Chenard-Walcker caught fire going down the Mulsanne Straight. He was able to pull over and get out safely, but the car was destroyed.

=== Night ===
After six hours as night fell, there were already only 25 cars left in the race. The Ariès had been leading after the demise of the Chenard-Walcker, then was delayed. The leading four cars had done 33 laps. Duff had to pit to clear a blockage in his gearbox. After half an hour and much hammering it was found to be an electrics staple. Just before midnight, Laly's 3.2-litre Ariès had to be retired with a blown head gasket. The two Bignans were now running 5th and 6th, the best of the 2-litre cars.

At 2am the two Lorraines still had a narrow lead over the Bentley in third. But at 3am de Courcelles slid off the road and bent his Lorraine's chassis delaying it as repairs were done, and slowing it for the rest of the race. The Bentley moved up when Robert Bloch then had to stop to repair broken rear shock absorbers – the Lorraine's Hartford duralumin units not strong enough for the treatment on the rough roads.

With the problems of the bigger cars, the de Tornaco/Barthélémy Bignan then found itself in second place overall at half-time. The 12CV Chenard-Walcker running 7th lost two laps when de Zúñiga burnt his hand doing engine repairs, but his co-driver Dauvergne could not be found to take over and had to be hailed over the loudspeakers.

=== Morning ===
As a clear morning dawned the leading two cars were still dicing until a second puncture on the Lorraine at 9am gave the Bentley a solid lead. At 10am, at three-quarter distance, Duff had done 97 laps with a 2 minute-lead over Bloch (96 laps) and further back, de Tornaco's Bignan (93 laps), Pisart's Chenard-Walcker and the other Bignan in 6th. Clement started putting in fast laps, extending his lead by ten seconds a lap, and it started overworking the Lorraine's engine as it struggled to keep up. Overtaken by the other two Lorraines moving back up the field, the Bignans slowed down. Soon after noon the Marie/Springuel car had to retire and the de Tornaco/Barthélémy car was delayed with engine issues.

Then, at 1pm, a valve broke in Bloch's engine and his Lorraine had to be retired. Meanwhile, the other two Lorraines, had been going as hard as they could to make up lost time and got themselves back up to second and third after their earlier delays.

=== Finish and post-race ===
Although the Rapson tyres were still working well, at 2.30pm Bentley called their car in for a precautionary change of the rear wheels. This soon became a major problem when one of the wheels appeared to have tampered with and could not be taken off. When they finally got out the pits with an hour still to run, Duff had done 120 laps (five ahead of their target). The long stop had, however, left the Bentley very close to losing the race as its final five laps (including pit-stop time) would be well below their prior race-average and therefore not be counted per the updated ACO regulations. So although Duff did five more laps over the last hour, they were not included. However, their lead was such that the 120 they had before the stop was just enough to take the victory by just one lap. It also meant the Bentley covered a shorter distance than Lagache/Léonard had covered in the previous year.

The two Lorraine-Dietrichs came in second and third, half a lap apart (having only just made their target distances), eight laps clear of the two 2-litre Chenard-Walckers. Neither of those cars were actually running at the end, when both drivers were left marooned when their cars’ brakes locked up solid out on the track in the last hour, however having exceeded their targets they were classified. The little 1-litre Amilcar, after an excellent run the previous year, was the final classified finisher. Doing two laps fewer than 1923 it was still enough to meet its new target and qualify for the third race.

The speed and weather had taken its toll on the big cars, and many only just made their assigned target distances. Best performances, winning the second interim leg of the Triennial Cup was the Verpault/Delabarre Brasier, ahead of the 2-litre Chenard-Walcker of Dauvergne/de Zúñiga and the Bentley. Only nine cars, of the twenty-one eligible, qualified for the third leg. As it transpired, Brasier leading the competition would not return to compete for the Cup. Financial troubles meant the company was sold in the early months of 1926.

Although neither of the 2-litre Chenard-Walckers were running at the finish they had still met their qualifying distance and were the two leading cars for the Biennial Cup, for which only eight cars qualified. In contrast two of the SARAs were unlucky to break down just laps short of meeting their target distances.

Just five weeks later another iconic endurance race had its inaugural race – the Spa 24 hours was won by a privateer 3-litre Bignan, ahead of the Lagache/Pisart Chenard-Walcker. Colomb's Corre-La Licorne won the 2-litre class and a privateer Amilcar won the 1100cc class.

== Official results ==
=== Finishers ===
Results taken from Quentin Spurring's book, officially licensed by the ACO Although there were no official engine classes, the highest finishers in unofficial categories aligned with the Index targets are in Bold text.

Pos	Class (Note: There were no official class divisions for this race. These are unofficial categories (used in subsequent years) related to the Index targets.)	No.	Team	Drivers	Chassis	Engine	Tyre	Target distance*	Laps
1	**3.0**	**8**	**(United Kingdom) Bentley Motors Limited**	**(Canada) John Duff** **(United Kingdom) Frank Clement**	Bentley 3 Litre Sport	Bentley 3.0L S4	Rapson	115 [T]	120 (125**)
2	**5.0**	**6**	**(France) Société Lorraine De Dietrich** **et Cie**	**(France) Henri Stoffel** **(France) Édouard Brisson**	Lorraine-Dietrich; B3-6 Sport	Lorraine-Dietrich 3.5L S6	**M**	119	119
3	5.0	5	(France) Société Lorraine De Dietrich et Cie	(France) Gérard de Courcelles (France) André Rossignol	Lorraine-Dietrich; B3-6 Sport	Lorraine-Dietrich 3.5L S6	**E**	119 [T]	119
4	**2.0**	**31**	**(France) Chenard-Walcker SA**	**(Belgium) André Pisart** **(France) Joseph Chavée**	Chenard-Walcker; Type TT 10/12CV	Chenard et Walcker 1973cc S4	**M**	101	111
5	2.0	30	(France) Chenard-Walcker SA	(France) Christian Dauvergne (Spain) Manso de Zúñiga	Chenard-Walcker; Type TT 10/12CV	Chenard et Walcker 1973cc S4	**M**	101 [T]	109
6	2.0	17	(France) Établissements Automobiles; Rolland et Pilain SA	(France) Gaston Delalande (France) Georges Guignard	Rolland-Pilain C23 Sport	Rolland-Pilain 1997cc S4	**M**	102 [T]	107
7	3.0	15	(France) Société des Automobiles; Brasier	(France) Eugéne Verpault (France) Marcel Delabarre	Brasier TB4	Brasier 2.1L S4	**D**	103 [T]	112 ***
8	3.0	16	(France) Société des Automobiles; Brasier	(France) . Migeot (France) Léopold Jouguet	Brasier TB4	Brasier 2.1L S4	**D**	103 [T]	105
9	2.0	19	(France) Établissements Automobiles; Rolland et Pilain SA	(France) Louis Sire (France) Louis Tremel	Rolland-Pilain C23 Sport	Rolland-Pilain 1997cc S4	**M**	102 [T]	104
10	2.0	28	(France) Établissements Industriels; Jacques Bignan	(Belgium) Baron Raymond de Tornaco (France) Francis Barthélémy	Bignan 2 Litre Sport	Bignan 1979cc S4	**E**	102 [T]	102
11	**1.1**	**51**	**(France) Société des Automobile**; **Ariès**	**(France) Fernand Gabriel** **(France) Henri Lapierre**	Ariès CC4	Ariès 1085cc S4	**M**	85	91
12	1.1	46	(France) Société des Automobiles à Refroidissements par Air	(France) André Marandet (France) Louis Francois	SARA ATS [7CV]	SARA 1099cc S4	**E**	85	89
13	1.1	50	(France) Société des Automobile; Ariès	(France) Louis Rigal (France) Roger Delano	Ariès CC2 Sport	Ariès 1085cc S4	**M**	85	89
14	1.1	52	(France) Société Nouvelle de l'Automobile Amilcar	(France) Maurice Boutmy (France) Jérôme Marcandanti	Amilcar CV	Amilcar 1004cc S4	**M**	83 [T]	87
N/C ****	1.5	38	(France) Chenard-Walcker SA	(France) Pierre Bacqueyrisses (France) Georges Delaroche	Chenard-Walcker; Type Y 9CV	Chenard-Walcker 1496cc.S4	**M**	93 [T]	84
N/C ****	1.5	40	(France) Constructions Métallurgiques; Usines Alba	(France) Raoul Roret (France) Bruno Calise	Alba S4 10/12CV	SCAP 1481cc S4	**D**	92	79

- Note *: [T]= car also entered in the Triennial Cup.
- Note **: Final laps not counted, as average speed was too slow.
- Note ***: Unknown why this many laps did not place the car 3rd overall, but still 1st in the Rudge-Whitworth competition.
- Note ****: Not Classified because did not meet target distance.

=== Did Not Finish ===
Pos	Class	No	Team	Drivers	Chassis	Engine	Tyre	Target distance**	Laps	Reason
DNF	5.0	4	(France) Société Lorraine De Dietrich et Cie	(France) Robert Bloch (France) Henri Stalter	Lorraine-Dietrich; B3-6 Sport	Lorraine-Dietrich 3.5L S6	M	119 [T]	112	Engine (21 hr)
DNF	2.0	29	(France) Établissements Industriels; Jacques Bignan	(France) René Marie (France) Henri Springuel	Bignan 2 Litre Sport	Bignan 1979cc S4	E	102	88	Engine (21 hr)
DNF	1.5	37	(France) Chenard-Walcker SA	(France) Robert Sénéchal (France) Raymond Glaszmann	Chenard-Walcker; Type Y 9CV	Chenard-Walcker 1496cc.S4	M	93 [T]	83	Engine (morning)
DNF	1.1	45	(France) Société des Automobiles à Refroidissements par Air	(France) Lucien Erb (France) Léon Fabert	SARA ATS [7CV]	SARA 1098cc S4	E	85 [T]	82	? (afternoon)
DNF	1.1	47	(France) Société des Automobiles à Refroidissements par Air	(Spain) Julio de Ségovia (France) . Alcain	SARA ATS [7CV]	SARA 1098cc S4	E	85	80	Engine (afternoon)
DNF	3.0	7	(France) Société des Automobile; Ariès	(France) Robert Laly (France) Charles Flohot	Ariès Type S GP	Ariés 3.2L S4	M	117	64	Engine (8hr)
DNF	2.0	20	(France) Établissements Automobiles; Rolland et Pilain SA	(France) Gérard Marinier (France) Antoine Dubreil	Rolland-Pilain C23 Sport	Rolland-Pilain 1997cc S4	M	102 [T]	60	Out of fuel (morning)
DNF	2.0	32	(France) Georges et René Pol	(France) Louis Henry (France) Jean Vaurez	G.R.P. 9CV	G.R.P. 1690cc S4	M	97	59	Engine (15hr)
DNF	1.5	43	(France) Société Française des Automobiles Corre	(France) Paul Drouin (France) Louis Balart	Corre La Licorne V16; 10CV Sport	SCAP 1481cc S4	M	92 [T]	58	Engine (15hr)
DNF	2.0	27	(France) Automobiles Georges Irat	(France) Jean Dourianou (France) Pierre Malleveau	Georges Irat Type 4A; Sport	Georges Irat 2.0L S4	M	102 [T]	42	Accident (late night)
DNF	2.0	23	(France) Établissements; Charles Montier et Cie	(France) Charles Montier (France) Albert Ouriou	Ford-Montier Speciale	Ford 1996cc S4	E	102 [T]	40	Engine (late night)
DNF	5.0	3	(France) Chenard-Walcker SA	(France) André Lagache (France) René Léonard	Chenard-Walcker; Type U 22CV Sport	Chenard-Walcker 3.9L S8	M	124	26	Fire (4 hr)
DNF	1.1	49	(France) Automobiles Majola	(France) Charles Follot (France) Fernand Casellini	Majola Type A	Majola 1088cc S4	D	85	22	Engine (evening)
DNF	2.0	18	(France) Établissements Automobiles; Rolland et Pilain SA	(France) Jean de Marguenat (France) René Gaudin	Rolland-Pilain C23 Sport	Rolland-Pilain 1997cc S4	M	102 [T]	18	Out of fuel (evening)
DNF	1.1	48	(France) Société Nouvelle de l'Automobile Amilcar	(France) André Morel (France) Marius Mestivier	Amilcar CGS	Amilcar 1089cc S4	E	85	13	Oil tank (evening)
DNF	1.5	33	(France) Louis Chenard	(France) Louis Chenard (France) Émile Chenard	Louis Chenard Type E	Chapuis-Dornier 1496cc S4	E	93	13	Radiator (evening)
DNF	2.0	25	(France) Automobiles Oméga-Six	(France) Marcel Mongin (France) Roland Coty	Oméga-Six Type A	Oméga 1996cc S6	M	102	11	Accident (evening)
DNF	3.0	11	(France) Établissements Industriels; Jacques Bignan	(France) Jacques Ledure (France) Jean Matthys	Bignan 3 Litre Sport	Bignan 3.0L S6	E	115	10	Engine (3 hr)
DNF	2.0	24	(France) Automobiles Oméga-Six	(France) Jacques Margueritte (France) Louis Bonne	Oméga-Six Type A	Oméga 1996cc S6	M	102	9	Engine (3 hr)
DSQ	3.0	10	(France) Établissements Industriels; Jacques Bignan	(France) Philippe de Marne (France) Jean Martin	Bignan 3 Litre Sport	Bignan 3.0L SI6	E	115 [T]	8	Premature refill (2 hr)
DNF	3.0	9	(France) Chenard-Walcker SA	(France) Raoul Bachmann (France) Fernand Bachmann	Chenard-Walcker; Type U 15CV Sport	Chenard-Walcker 3.0L S4	M	115	6	Fire (2 hr)
DNF	1.5	44	(France) Société Française des Automobiles Corre	(France) Fernand Vallon (France) Joseph Paul	Corre La Licorne V16; 10CV Sport	SCAP 1481cc S4	M	92	5	Engine (1 hr)
DNF	1.5	42	(France) Société Française des Automobiles Corre	(France) Albert Colomb (France) Waldemar Lestienne	Corre La Licorne V16; 10CV Sport	SCAP 1481cc S4	M	92 [T]	3	Engine (1 hr)
DNF	3.0	12	(France) Société des Automobile; Ariès	(France) Arthur Duray (Italy) Giulio Foresti	Ariès Type S GP	Ariés 3.0L S4	M	115	3	Engine (1 hr)
DNF	1.5	41	(France) Constructions Métallurgiques; Usines Alba	(France) . Hatton (France) . Dreux	Alba S4 10/12CV	SCAP 1481cc S4	D	92	1	Radiator (1 hr)

=== Did Not Start ===
Pos	Class	No	Team	Drivers	Chassis	Engine	Reason
DNS	2.0	26	(France) Automobiles Georges Irat	(France) Maurice Rost (France) Jean Lassalle	Georges Irat Type 4A; Sport	Georges Irat 2.0L S4	Practice Accident
DNA	8.0	1	(France) Automobiles Delage SA		Delage GL	Delage 6.0L S6	Did not arrive
DNA	3.0	2	(France) Automobiles Delage SA		Delage GL	Delage 6.0L S6	Did not arrive
DNA	3.0	13	(United Kingdom) Sunbeam Car Company	(United Kingdom) Kenelm Lee Guinness	Sunbeam 3 Litre Super Sports	Sunbeam 2.9L S6	Did not arrive
DNA	3.0	14	(United Kingdom) Sunbeam Car Company	(United Kingdom) Dario Resta	Sunbeam 3 Litre Super Sports	Sunbeam 2.9L S6	Did not arrive
DNA	2.0	21	(France) Automobiles Ettore Bugatti		Bugatti Type 30	Bugatti 1997cc S8	Did not arrive
DNA	2.0	22	(France) Automobiles Ettore Bugatti		Bugatti Type 30	Bugatti 1997cc S8	Did not arrive
DNA	1.5	34	(France) Automobiles Ettore Bugatti		Bugatti T22	Bugatti 1496cc S4	Did not arrive
DNA	1.5	35	(France) Automobiles Ettore Bugatti		Bugatti T22	Bugatti 1496cc S4	Did not arrive
DNA	1.5	36	(France) Automobiles Ettore Bugatti		Bugatti T22	Bugatti 1496cc S4	Did not arrive
DNA	1.5	39	(France) Automobiles La Perle		La Perle 10CV	Bignan 1493cc S4	Did not arrive

=== Interim Coupe Triennale Rudge-Whitworth Positions ===
Pos	Class	No.	Team	Drivers	Chassis	Target Laps	Laps	Laps Over
1	3.0	15	(France) Société des Automobiles; Brasier	(France) Eugéne Verpault (France) Marcel Delabarre	Brasier TB4	103	112 ***	+9
2	2.0	30	(France) Chenard-Walcker SA	(France) Christian Dauvergne (Spain) Manso de Zúñiga	Chenard-Walcker Type TT 10/12CV	101	109	+8
3=	3.0	8	(United Kingdom) Bentley Motors Limited	(Canada) John Duff (United Kingdom) Frank Clement	Bentley 3 Litre Sport	115	120	+5
3=	2.0	17	(France) Établissements Automobiles; Rolland et Pilain SA	(France) Gaston Delalande (France) Georges Guignard	Rolland-Pilain C23 Sport	102	107	+5
5	1.1	52	(France) Société Nouvelle de l'Automobile Amilcar	(France) Maurice Boutmy (France) Jérôme Marcandanti	Amilcar CV	83	87	+4
6=	3.0	16	(France) Société des Automobiles; Brasier	(France) . Migeot (France) Léopold Jouguet	Brasier TB4	103	105	+2
6=	2.0	19	(France) Établissements Automobiles; Rolland et Pilain SA	(France) Louis Sire (France) Louis Tremel	Rolland-Pilain C23 Sport	102	104	+2
8=	5.0	5	(France) Société Lorraine De Dietrich et Cie	(France) Gérard de Courcelles (France) André Rossignol	Lorraine-Dietrich B3-6 Sport	119	119	+0
8=	2.0	28	(France) Établissements Industriels; Jacques Bignan	(Belgium) Baron Raymond de Tornaco (France) Francis Barthélémy	Bignan 2 Litre Sport	102	102	+0

=== Interim Coupe Biennale Rudge-Whitworth Positions ===
Pos	Class	No.	Team	Drivers	Chassis	Target Laps	Laps	Laps Over
1	2.0	31	(France) Chenard-Walcker SA	(Belgium) André Pisart (France) Joseph Chavée	Chenard-Walcker Type TT 10/12CV	101	111	+10
2	3.0	15	(France) Société des Automobiles; Brasier	(France) Eugéne Verpault (France) Marcel Delabarre	Brasier TB4	103	112 ***	+9
3	2.0	30	(France) Chenard-Walcker SA	(France) Christian Dauvergne (Spain) Manso de Zúñiga	Chenard-Walcker Type TT 10/12CV	101	109	+8
4	1.1	51	(France) Société des Automobile Ariès	(France) Fernand Gabriel (France) Henri Lapierre	Ariès CC4	85	91	+6
5	2.0	17	(France) Établissements Automobiles; Rolland et Pilain SA	(France) Gaston Delalande (France) Georges Guignard	Rolland-Pilain C23 Sport	102	107	+5
6=	1.1	46	(France) Société des Applications à Refroidissements par Air	(France) André Marandet (France) Louis Francois	SARA ATS	85	89	+4
6=	1.1	50	(France) Société des Automobile Ariès	(France) Louis Rigal (France) Roger Delano	Ariès CC2 Sport	85	89	+4
6=	1.1	52	(France) Société Nouvelle de l'Automobile Amilcar	(France) Maurice Boutmy (France) Jérôme Marcandanti	Amilcar CV	83	87	+4
9=	3.0	16	(France) Société des Automobiles; Brasier	(France) . Migeot (France) Léopold Jouguet	Brasier TB4	103	105	+2
9=	2.0	19	(France) Établissements Automobiles; Rolland et Pilain SA	(France) Louis Sire (France) Louis Tremel	Rolland-Pilain C23 Sport	102	104	+2
11=	5.0	5	(France) Société Lorraine De Dietrich et Cie	(France) Gérard de Courcelles (France) André Rossignol	Lorraine-Dietrich B3-6 Sport	119	119	+0
11=	5.0	6	(France) Société Lorraine De Dietrich et Cie	(France) Henri Stoffel (France) Édouard Brisson	Lorraine-Dietrich B3-6 Sport	119	119	+0
11=	2.0	28	(France) Établissements Industriels; Jacques Bignan	(Belgium) Baron Raymond de Tornaco (France) Francis Barthélémy	Bignan 2 Litre Sport	102	102	+0

=== Highest Finisher in Class ===
Class	Winning car	Winning drivers
5 to 8-litre	no entrants	
3 to 5-litre	#6 L Lorraine-Dietrich B3-6 Sport	Stoffel / Brisson *
2 to 3-litre	#8 Bentley 3-Litre Sport	Duff / Clement
1500 to 2000cc	#31 Chenard-Walcker Type TT 10/12CV	Pisart / Chavée
1100 to 1500cc	no finishers	
750 to 1100cc	#51 Ariès CC4	Gabriel / Lapierre

- Note: setting a new class distance record.

With no official class divisions, these are the highest finishers in unofficial categories aligned with the Index targets.

=== Statistics ===
Taken from Quentin Spurring's book, officially licensed by the ACO

- Fastest Lap – A. Lagache, #3 Chenard-Walcker Type U 22CV Sport – 9:19secs; 111.17 km/h (69.08 mph)
- Longest Distance – 2,077.34 km (1,290.80 mi)
- Average Speed on Longest Distance – 86.56 km/h (53.79 mph)

Citations
