= Carrosserie Gaston Grümmer =

Carrosserie Gaston Grümmer was a French coachbuilder based in Clichy, a suburb of Paris. Founded on July 30, 1924, Grümmer designed and produced individual bodies for luxury automobiles in the period between the world wars. In the 1930s, Grümmer was considered a pioneer of lightweight construction and aerodynamics.

== Family history ==
The company was founded by Gaston Grümmer. He came from a family that had lived in Aachen since the 17th century. His grandfather Friedrich Joseph Grümmer moved to Brussels in the 19th century, where he set up a saddlery business that specialized in furnishing high-quality carriages. He later moved to Paris. His son Antoine Joseph worked for the long-established Paris tableware manufacturer Morel since at least the turn of the century. In 1919, Antoine Grümmer's sons, including Gaston, took over the Morels business and renamed it Établissements Grümmer. In the early years, the Grümmer brothers still manufactured high-quality, individual interior fittings for carriages, but then made the switch to automobiles.

== Company history ==
In 1924, Gaston Grümmer left his brothers' business, which continued to exist until 1933, and set up his own business in the Paris suburb of Clichy. In the company named after him, Grümmer initially manufactured bodies based on the Weymann patent, but at the same time worked on independent design features. At the Nice Concours d'Elegance in March 1925, an Oméga-Six with a torpedo body won first prize, the first award for a car with Gaston Grümmer bodywork. At the L'Auto Concours d'Elegance in June 1927, Gaston Grümmer created a surprise by being one of the first coachbuilders to offer upholstery and car interior trim in reptile leather. The following year, Marcelle Rahna presented an eight-cylinder 35 HP Panhard with a coach body and whose interior, covered in snakeskin leather, could be transformed into a sleeping car: the front seats could be converted into a bed, a liquor bar was installed in the dashboard and a picnic kit placed was placed in a wing box.

Grümmer, who took part in the First World War as a pilot, was influenced by aviation and therefore increasingly sought consistent lightweight construction, aerodynamics and body shapes that were as low as possible. In the first few years he worked with the aviation pioneer Étienne Bunau-Varilla. Both developed techniques to lower the center of gravity of automobiles. From 1930 onwards there was a collaboration with Guillaume Busson, who was also a pilot and, like Grümmer, was interested in developing aerodynamically favorable bodies. In 1933 the first Grümmer bodies appeared, the style of which was characterized by aerodynamic criteria. The bodies, called Aéroprofile, had flowing shapes, a windshield that was steeply inclined compared to the usual contemporary bodies, headlights integrated into the body, concealed rear wheels and a long, flat rear. Such bodies were built on chassis from Alfa Romeo, Renault, Hispano-Suiza and more. In 1933, Grümmer also unveiled the Hirondelle, a new style of convertible whose fixed roof line extended onto the rear wing, reminiscent of the wings of a swallow. Some Delage and Hispano-Suiza models received this type of bodywork.

Depending on the source, Gaston Grümmer existed until 1935 or 1939, victim of the economic crisis, after having built around 850 bodies. They were listed as a bankruptcy in August 1935.

== Gallery ==
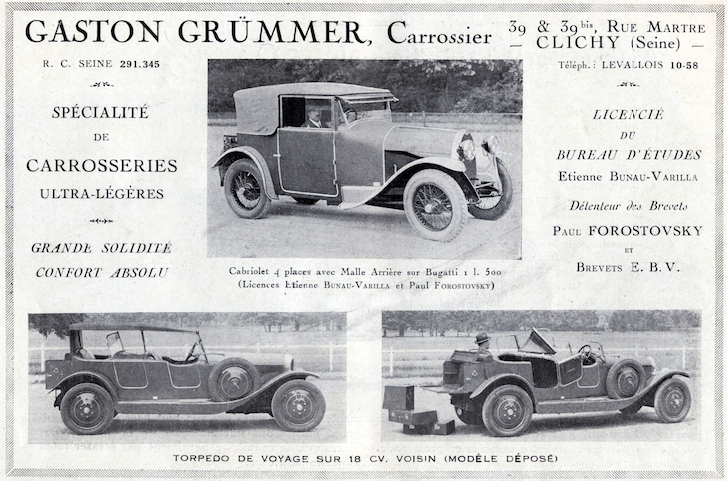
An advertisement from 1925

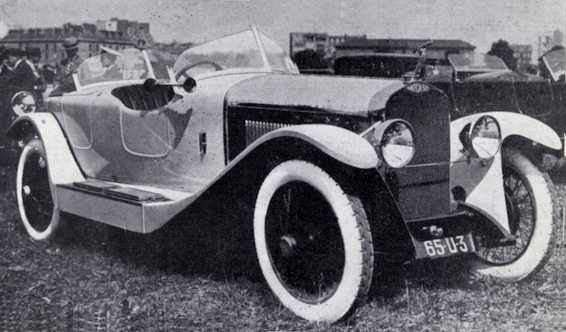
Oméga-Six Type A torpedo bodied by Gaston Grümmer at the 1925 L'Auto Concours d'Elegance (car by Elie Volterra).

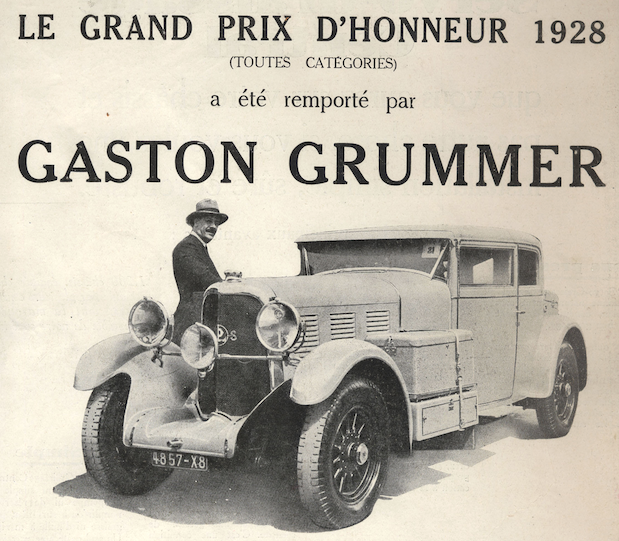
Panhard & Levassor 35 CV low-loaded coach (EBV).

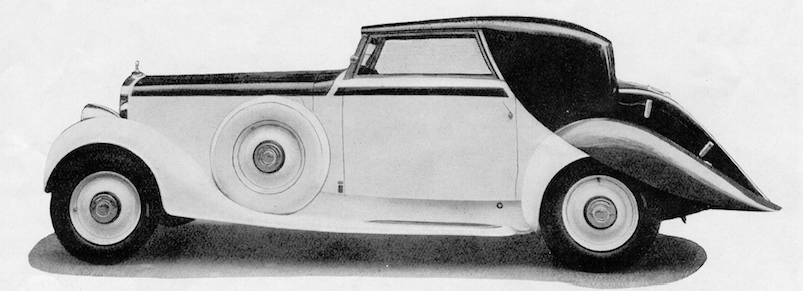
A Delage D8-11 with Hirondelle bodywork by Gaston Grümmer (1933).

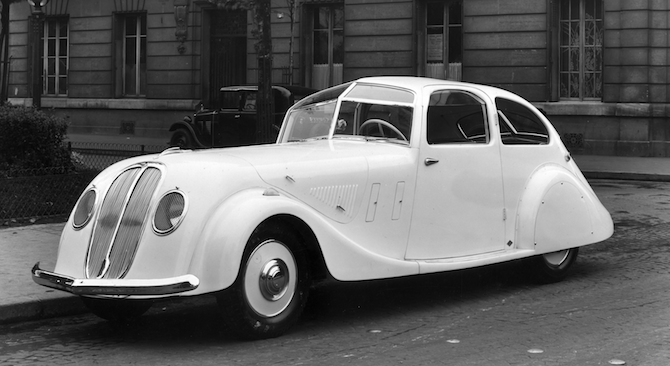
Renault Nervasport coupe with Aéroprofil bodywork by Gaston Grümmer (1934)

== Literature ==
- Grümmer, Philippe; Friry, Laurent (2017), Gaston Grümmer: The Art of Carrosserie, Dalton Watson Fine Book, ISBN 978-1-85443-294-0
- Bellu, Serge (2012), A French Touch of Class. Les Ateliers de carrosserie français, Éditions Nicolas Chaudun, ISBN 978-2-35039-136-6
