= Louis Chenard =

Automobiles Louis Chenard
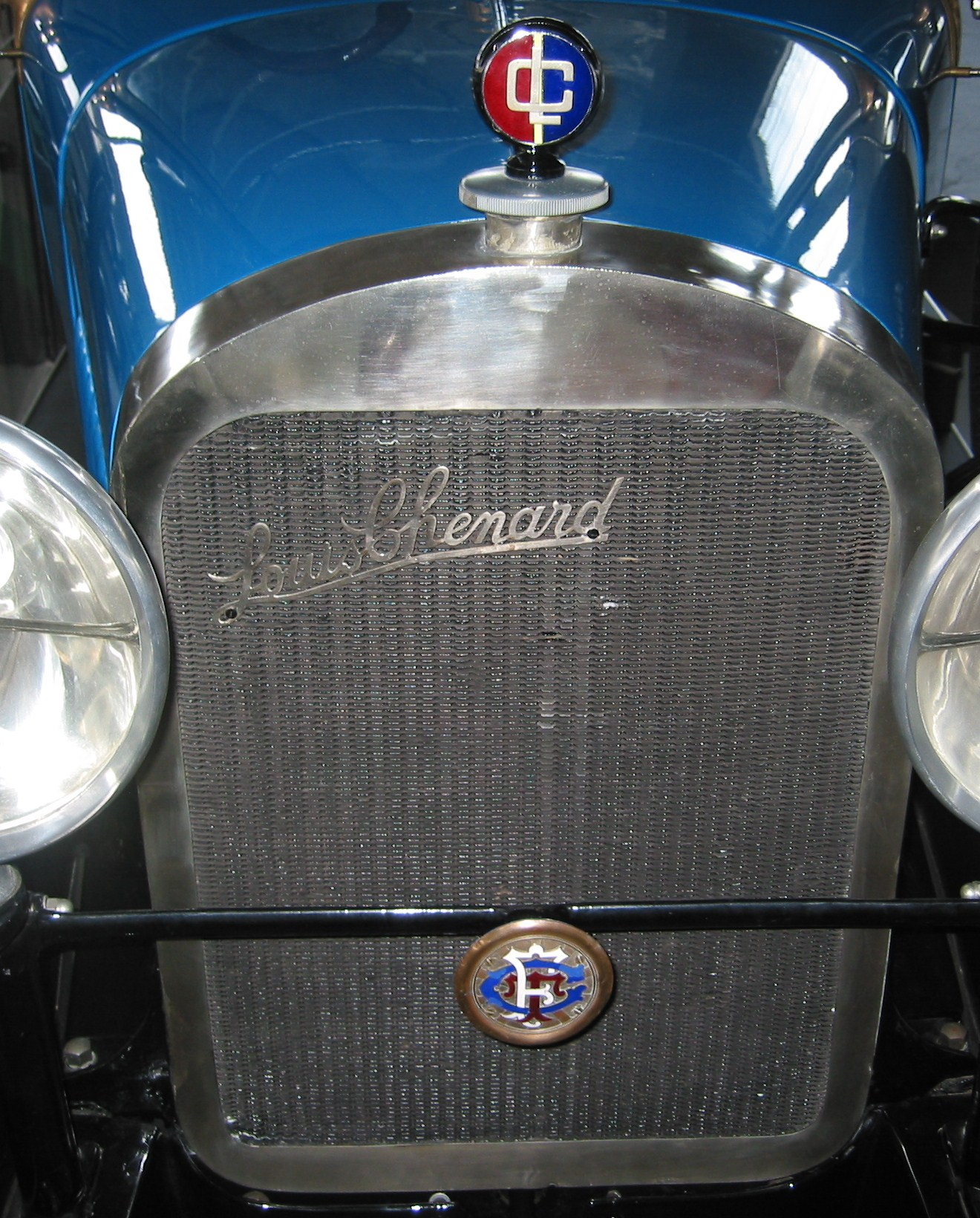
- Industry: Manufacturing
- Founded: 1920
- Defunct: 1932
- Headquarters: Colombes, France
- Key people: Louis Chenard
- Products: Automobiles

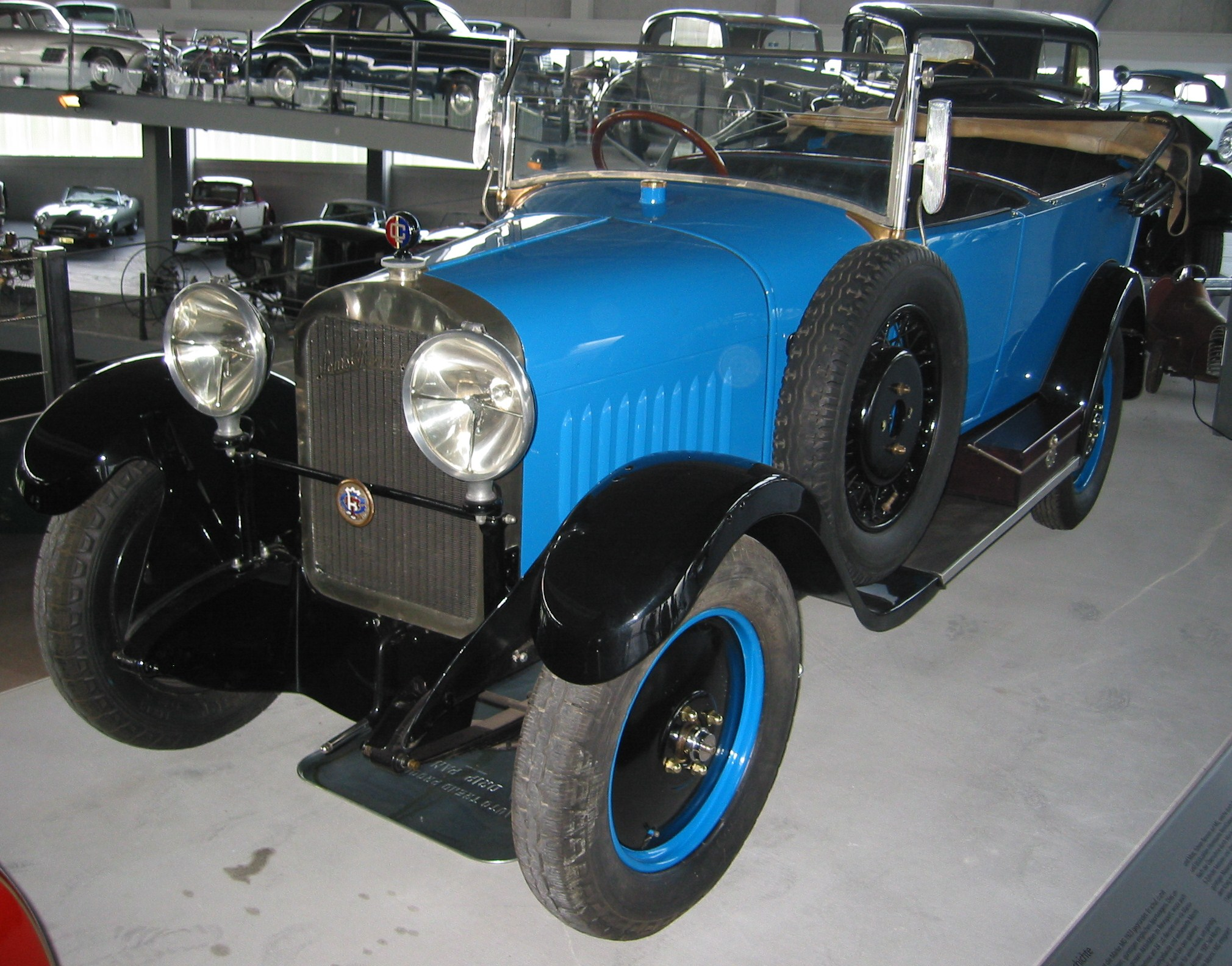

Louis Chenard was a French producer of automobiles, making cars at Colombes, near Paris from 1920 till 1932. Louis Chenard was always a relatively low volume manufacturer. Engines were bought in, mostly from Chapuis-Dornier.

There is no connection between Louis Chenard and the larger, better remembered Chenard & Walcker company.

== The cars ==
Louis Chenard's first car was a 7/9CV presented in 1920, featuring a 4-cylinder 1¼-litre engine and 3 forward speeds. 4-speed transmissions and a choice of engines soon followed.

At the time of the 19th Paris Motor Show, in October 1924, the Louis Chenard range was focused on two models. The "Louis Chenard Type D" competed in the 7HP class. It was powered by a 1095cc overhead valve engine and sat on a 2,600 mm (102 in) wheelbase. The other model closely resembled the "Type D", but its 1495cc engine placed it in the 10HP class, and its 2,850 mm (112 in) wheelbase made it slightly longer. Fitted with "Torpedo" bodies the two models were in 1924 priced by the manufacturer at respectively 18,000 francs and 22,900 francs.

The same range was on offer two years later at the 20th Paris Motor Show in October 1926. Prices had increased, however, and "Torpedo" bodied versions were in 1926 priced by the manufacturer at 26,950 francs (7HP) and 32,750 francs (10HP).

== Competition ==
A Louis Chenard competed in the 24 Hour Race in 1924, driven by Louis Chenard himself (with a family member as a co-driver). The car retired after 13 laps. However, that year there were many early retirements, and Louis Chenard had kept going for long enough to be placed 32nd out of the 39 cars that started.

== Reading list ==
- Harald Linz, Halwart Schrader: Die Internationale Automobil-Enzyklopädie. United Soft Media Verlag, München 2008, ISBN 978-3-8032-9876-8. (German)
- George Nick Georgano (Chefredakteur): The Beaulieu Encyclopedia of the Automobile. Volume 3: P–Z. Fitzroy Dearborn Publishers, Chicago 2001, ISBN 1-57958-293-1. (English)
- George Nick Georgano: Autos. Encyclopédie complète. 1885 à nos jours. Courtille, Paris 1975. (French)
