= Majola =

French automobile and engine manufacturer

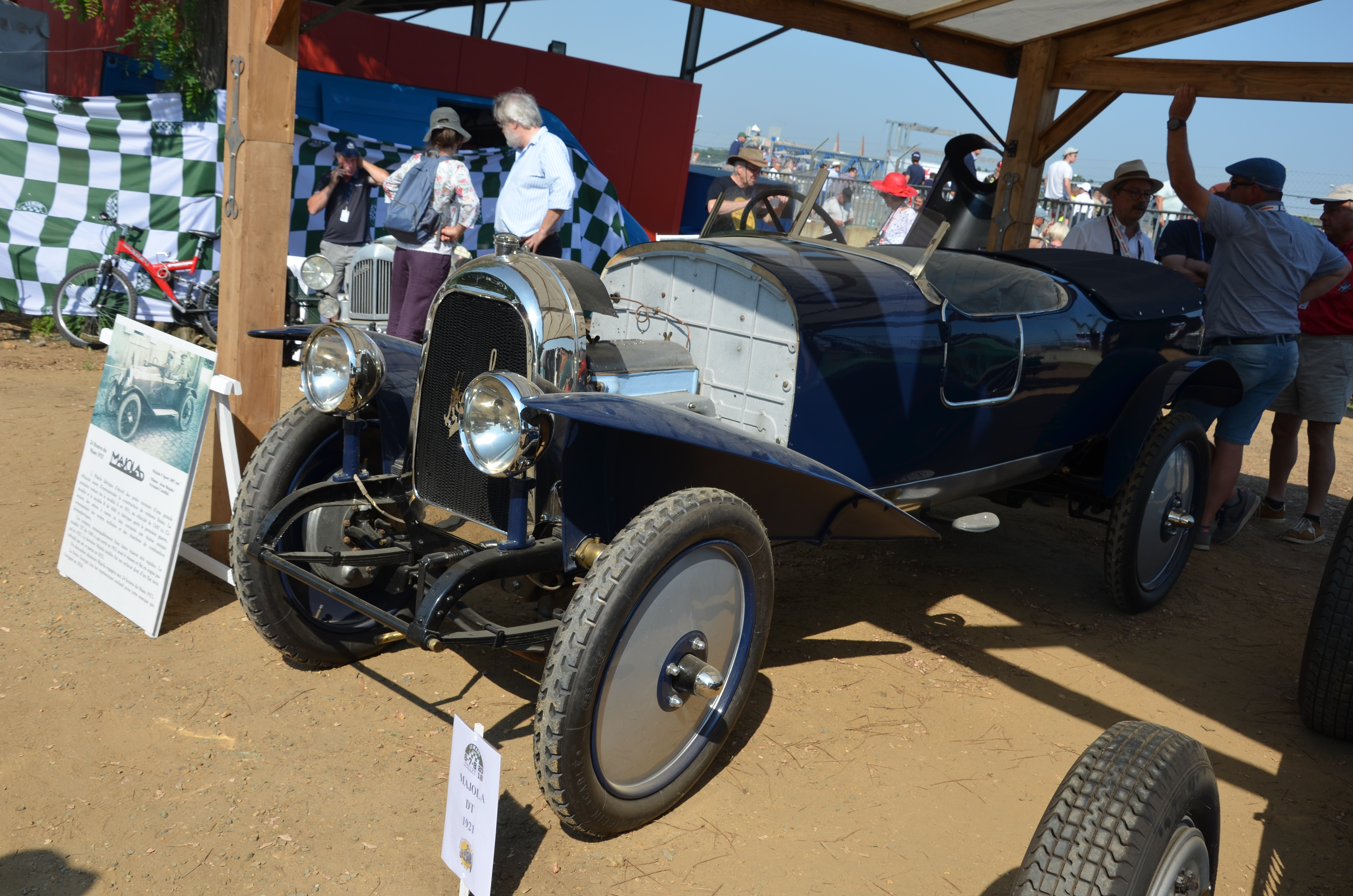
- Majola DT 1921 at the 2018 Le Mans Classic
- Industry: Manufacturing
- Founded: 1908
- Defunct: 1928
- Headquarters: Initially Saint-Denis subsequently Chatou; France
- Key people: Jean Majola; Georges Irat
- Products: Automobiles, engines

Majola was a French producer of engines and automobiles, established in 1908 and producing automobiles from 1911 till 1928.

== The business ==
Jean Majola founded the company in 1908 at Saint-Denis on the north side of Paris, initially for the production of automobiles engines. Automobiles, developed during this early period by a man called F.Doutré, followed in 1911. The business was taken over by Georges Irat in or at some stage after 1920, and by 1925 production had been shifted the short distance to the Georges Irat home town of Chatou.

Production ended in 1928.

== The cars ==
The first car, the "Majola Type A" appeared in 1911. It was powered by a 4-cylinder engine of 1.3-litres. Soon afterwards a second model, the "Majola Type B" was added, also powered by a 4-cylinder engine, but the engine on the "Type B" was only a 1-litre unit. Both these models would reappear after the war.

The two little 4-cylinder engined cars comprised the range exhibited at the 15th Paris Motor Show in October 1919. The more powerful was identified as the Majola 10/20 HP, its engine size given as 1,390cc, and the less powerful 6/12 HP was powered by a 983cc 4-cylinder power unit. The wheelbases were respectively 2,800 mm (110 in) and 2,300 mm (91 in). Contemporary photographs show both cars fitted with "Torpedo" bodies which provided seating for four on the longer chassis and for two on the shorter one.

At the 19th Paris Motor Show in October 1924 Majola again exhibited two small cars with 4-cylinder engines. The larger engine was still of 1,390cc. The smaller engine retained the 90 mm (3.54 in) piston stroke of the car exhibited five years before, but the cylinder diameter (bore) had been increased by 3 mm (0.12 in) giving rise to an overall capacity increase to 1,088cc. The increased cylinder bore also raised the car tax band and the car was branded as a "7 HP". The 2,800 mm (110 in) wheelbase of the larger model was, like the engine size, unchanged, but the less powerful model now sat on a 2,450 mm (96 in) wheelbase. In October 1924 The manufacturer was quoting a prices for the two cars, when fitted with a 4-seater "Torpedo" bodies. of 24,300 francs and 18,900 francs.

There was no Paris Motor Show in October 1925, the venue having been booked instead for an Exhibition of Decorative Arts. In October 1926 the Motor Show returned. Majola again took a stand, and again exhibited their "7 HP" and "10 HP", powered by the same 1,088cc and 1,390cc engines as before. This time the familiar models were joined by a 5 HP Cyclecar powered by an air-cooled engine designed by an engineer called Vaslin, who had built his reputation as the creator of a succession of light-weight aero-engines.

== Competition ==
A sports bodied 1,390cc Majola participated in the Le Mans 24 Hour race in 1925, driven by Jean Majola himself (partnered by Fernand Casellini), but the car failed to distinguish itself, retiring after 14 laps.

== Reading list ==
- Harald Linz, Halwart Schrader: Die Internationale Automobil-Enzyklopädie. United Soft Media Verlag, München 2008, ISBN 978-3-8032-9876-8. (German)
- George Nick Georgano (Chefredakteur): The Beaulieu Encyclopedia of the Automobile. Volume 3: P–Z. Fitzroy Dearborn Publishers, Chicago 2001, ISBN 1-57958-293-1. (English)
- George Nick Georgano: Autos. Encyclopédie complète. 1885 à nos jours. Courtille, Paris 1975. (French)
