= François-Louis =

François-Louis is a French masculine compound given name which may refer to:

- François-Louis David Bocion (1828–1890), Swiss painter, designer and art professor
- François-Louis de Brach, 18th century French Navy lieutenant-colonel
- François-Louis Cailler (1796–1852), Swiss entrepreneur and early chocolatier, founder of Cailler, the first modern brand of Swiss chocolate
- François-Louis Chartier de Lotbinière (1716–1785 or later), a priest in New France (now Canada)
- François-Louis Crosnier (1792–1867), French theatre manager, politician and playwright
- François-Louis Dejuinne (1786–1844), French painter
- François-Louis Français (1814–1897), French painter, lithographer, illustrator and printmaker
- François-Louis Gand Le Bland Du Roullet (1716–1786), French diplomat and playwright
- François-Louis Gounod (1758–1825), French painter
- François-Louis Henry (1786–1855), French baritone
- François-Louis Laporte, comte de Castelnau (1810–1880), French naturalist
- François-Louis Lessard (1860–1927), Canadian major general
- François-Louis du Maitz de Goimpy (1729–1807), French Navy officer
- François-Louis Perne (1772–1832), French composer and musicographer
- François-Louis de Pourroy de Lauberivière (1711–1740), fifth bishop of the diocese of Quebec
- François-Louis Schmied (1873–1941), French painter, wood engraver, printer, editor, illustrator and bookbinder
- François-Louis Tremblay (born 1980), Canadian Olympic champion speed skater

== See also ==
- François Louis, Prince of Conti (1664–1709), French nobleman
- François Louis, Count of Harcourt (1623–1694) French nobleman
- François Louis de Rousselet, Marquis de Châteaurenault (1637–1716), French vice-admiral, maréchal and Governor of Brittany
- François Louis Bourdon (1758–1797), French politician
- François Louis Dedon-Duclos (1762–1830), French lieutenant general
- François Louis Michel Chemin Deforgues (1759–1840), French politician and Foreign Minister
- François Louis Alfred Durrieu (1812–1877), French major general and Governor of Algeria
- François Louis de Fitte (1751–1793), French royalist general
- François Louis Fournier-Sarlovèze (1773–1827), French general of the Napoleonic Wars
- François Louis Thomas Francia (1772–1839), French watercolour painter
- François Louis Ganshof (1895–1980), Belgian medievalist
- Francois Louis Paul Gervais (1816–1879), French palaeontologist and entomologist
- François Louis de Salignac (1722–1767), French soldier, playwright and Governor of Martinique
- Francois Louis, inventor of the aulochrome, a woodwind musical instrument
- François-Louis-Joseph Watteau (1758–1823), French painter
- Louis-François (disambiguation)
