= Jean-Marie Corre =

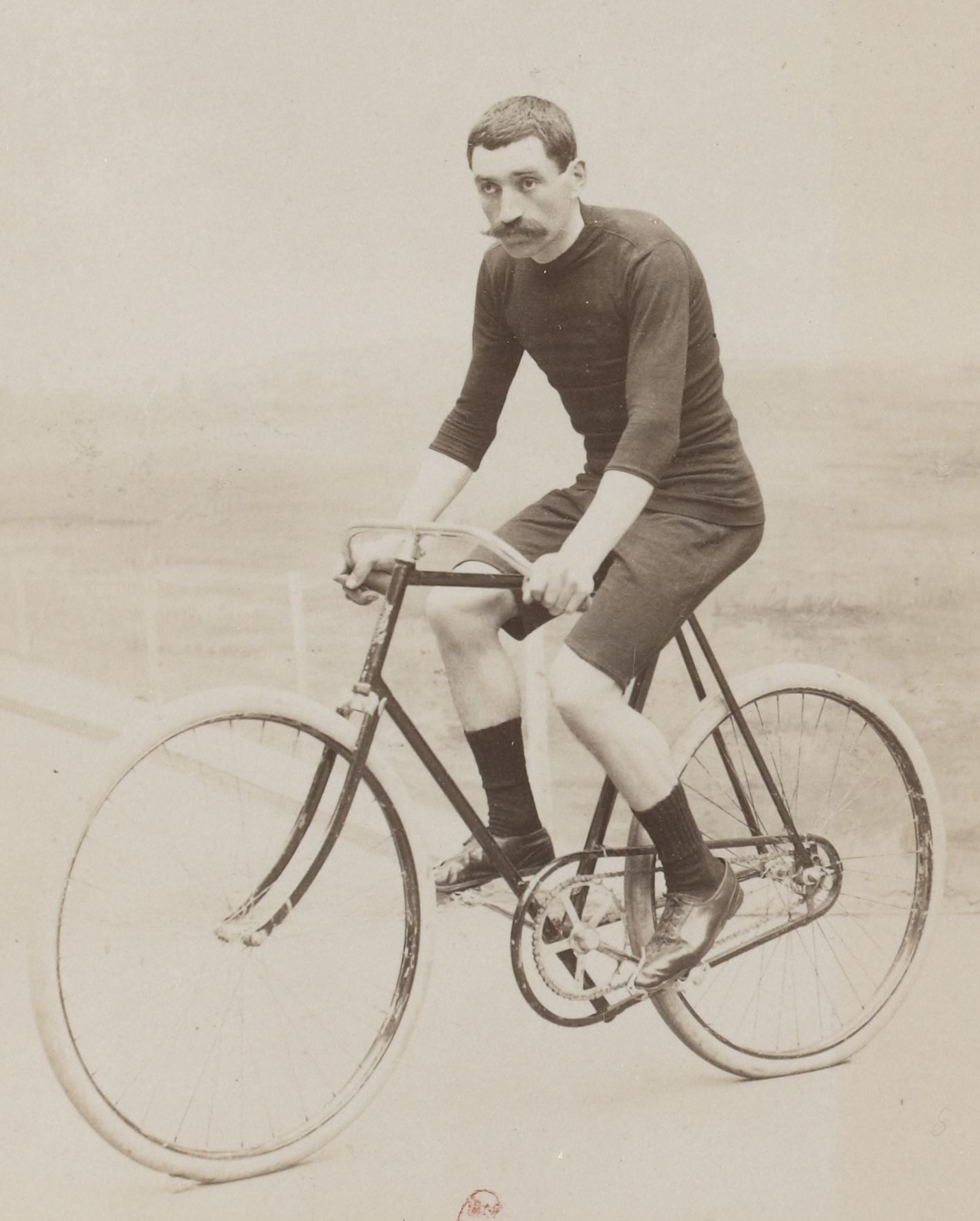
Jean Marie Corre (1898)

Jean-Marie Corre (21 May 1864, Tremel, Côtes-d'Armor – 18 September 1915) was a French cyclist and bicycle maker from 1895 to 1914, with workshops in Paris and Rueil, and an automobile manufacturer under the brand Corre, and later Corre La Licorne, with the factory located in Levallois-Perret.

In 1907, the Lestienne family, industrial spinners from Nord, took over the Société française des automobiles Corre. The arms of this family were a unicorn (fr: licorne), which became the mark and gradually the name of the firm. It remained active until 1949 under the name of Licorne or La Licorne, before being taken over by Berliet. This takeover followed steel shortages due to the plan Pons, a five-year program for the recreation of French industry through policies such as manufacturing sports and luxury cars, as well as Citroen's decision to stop delivering engines.

Jean-Marie Corre continued a side business of artisanal automobile manufacturing branded "Corre, JC and Le Cor" until 1913.

He married Marie-Augustine Kerharo in Plestin-les-Grèves on 17 August 1892.

== See also ==
- Corre La Licorne
