= Oméga-Six =

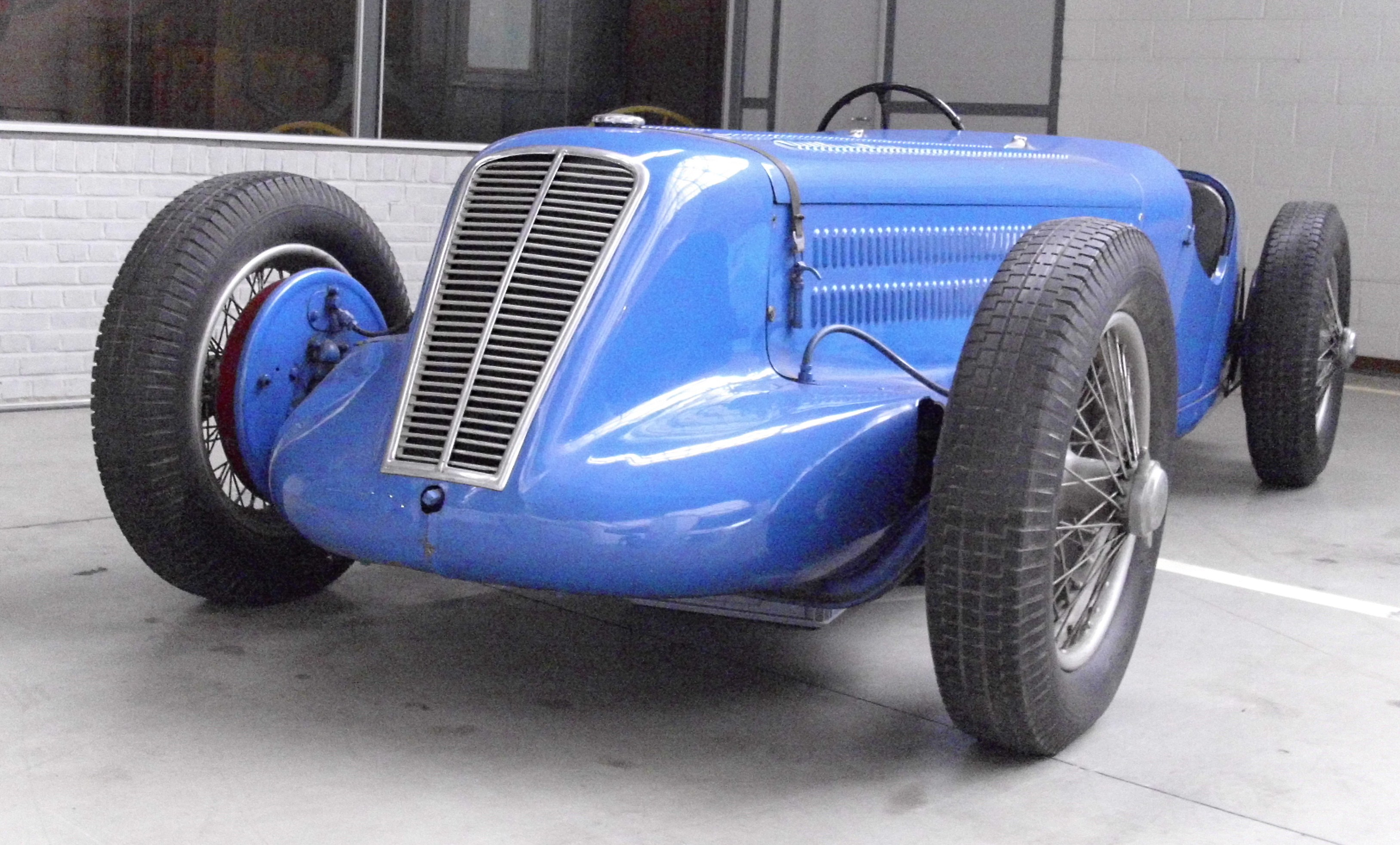
- Industry: Manufacturing
- Founded: 1922
- Defunct: 1930
- Headquarters: Boulogne-Billancourt, France
- Key people: Gabriel Daubeck; Maurice Gadoux; Jacques (Francis Georges Achille) Boyriven
- Products: Automobiles

Automobiles Oméga-Six was a French automobile manufactured in the Paris region by Gabriel Daubeck between 1922 and 1930.

== Etymology ==
Initially the cars used six-cylinder engines, hence the word "Six" in the company name.

== History ==
Jules Daubeck founded the business in Pantin in north-eastern Paris in 1922. Later, in 1925, the business relocated to the west side of the city, to premises at Boulogne-Billancourt in the Rue de Silly. Production ended in 1930.

The cars were designed by Maurice Gadoux, who previously had worked for Hispano-Suiza, and focused on the same "compact luxury" market segment.

Approximately 50 cars were produced annually.

== Cars ==
The first model used a 1996cc overhead camshaft engine that placed it in the 12 HP car tax band and produced a claimed 50 hp of power. Claimed top speed for an open topped sports-bodied car was 120 km/h (75 mph). There was a choice of 3,050 mm (120 in) or 3,300 mm (130 in) wheelbases. Available body styles included a "Touring car", a "Limousine" (sedan/saloon) and "Coupé de Ville" (town car).

For 1924 Solex carburettors were fitted, power increased to 55 hp, and four speed transmission replaced the three speeds with which it had been launched.

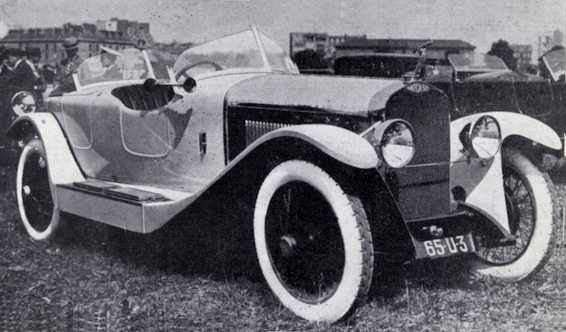
Oméga-Six type A torpédo body by Gaston Grümmer at a Concours d'élégance de L'Auto in June 1925

At the 19th Paris Motor Show in October 1924 the 1996cc overhead camshaft engine had twin carburetors and the wheelbase was increased to 3,250 mm (128 in). It was priced, in bare chassis form, at 60,000 francs.

A larger 2660cc engine was available in 1926, and was exhibited alongside the 1996cc model in October 1926 at the 20th Paris Motor Show. In October 1926 the list prices for the base chassis were 65,000 francs (1996cc) and 70,000 francs (2660cc).

At the 22nd Paris Motor Show in October 1928 the six cylinder cars were still on display, using the 3,250 mm (128 in) chassis and now priced, in bare chassis form, at 80,000 francs (1996cc) and 85,000 francs (2660cc). There was also a 3-litre 6-cylinder "competition" engine that used twin "Cozette" carburetors and for which 150 hp was claimed.

In 1929 the 6-cylinder range was supplemented by two new 8-cylinder engined cars with displacement respectively of 3-litres and 4-litres (17CV and 24CV). The 8-cylinder cars had a 3,600 mm (142 in) wheelbase and were priced at 115,000 francs and 120,000 francs.

== Competition ==
Oméga-Six 1929

In 1924 two cars entered the Le Mans 24 Hour race, but both retired and were classified 33rd and 35th.

At the 1925 Le Mans 24 hours the three Oméga-Sixes did not start because of problems during practices. They were car no. 25 of Jacques Margueritte and Louis Bonne, car no. 26 of Roland Coty and Albert Clement, and car no. 27 of "Sabipa" and Jacques Achilles Boyriven.

At the Circuit des Routes Pavées event in September 1926 J Achilles Boyriven finished 4th, in 1929 he finished 3rd, and in 1930 he finished 7th after completing 507 km in the 5 litre class. In 1928 Louis Bonne finished first in the S3.0 class.

At the Spa 24 Hours race J Achilles Boyriven finished second in 1928 and third in 1929.

In 1929, Boyriven 'did not arrive' for the II Grand Prix d'Algèrie in April, but Bayssières finished second at the V Grand Prix de Picardie in June and then did not arrive for the I Grand Prix de Dieppe.

In 1929, Oméga-Six recorded its only victory of note when Hellé Nice won the all-female Grand Prix Féminin, a short (50 km) handicap race contested by just five cars at the end of the 3rd annual Journée Féminine de l'automobile held on 2 June at Autodrome de Linas-Montlhéry.

== Reading list ==
- Harald Linz, Halwart Schrader: Die Internationale Automobil-Enzyklopädie. United Soft Media Verlag, München 2008, ISBN 978-3-8032-9876-8. (German)
- George Nick Georgano (Chefredakteur): The Beaulieu Encyclopedia of the Automobile. Volume 3: P–Z. Fitzroy Dearborn Publishers, Chicago 2001, ISBN 1-57958-293-1. (English)
- George Nick Georgano: Autos. Encyclopédie complète. 1885 à nos jours. Courtille, Paris 1975. (French)
