= Michel Irat =

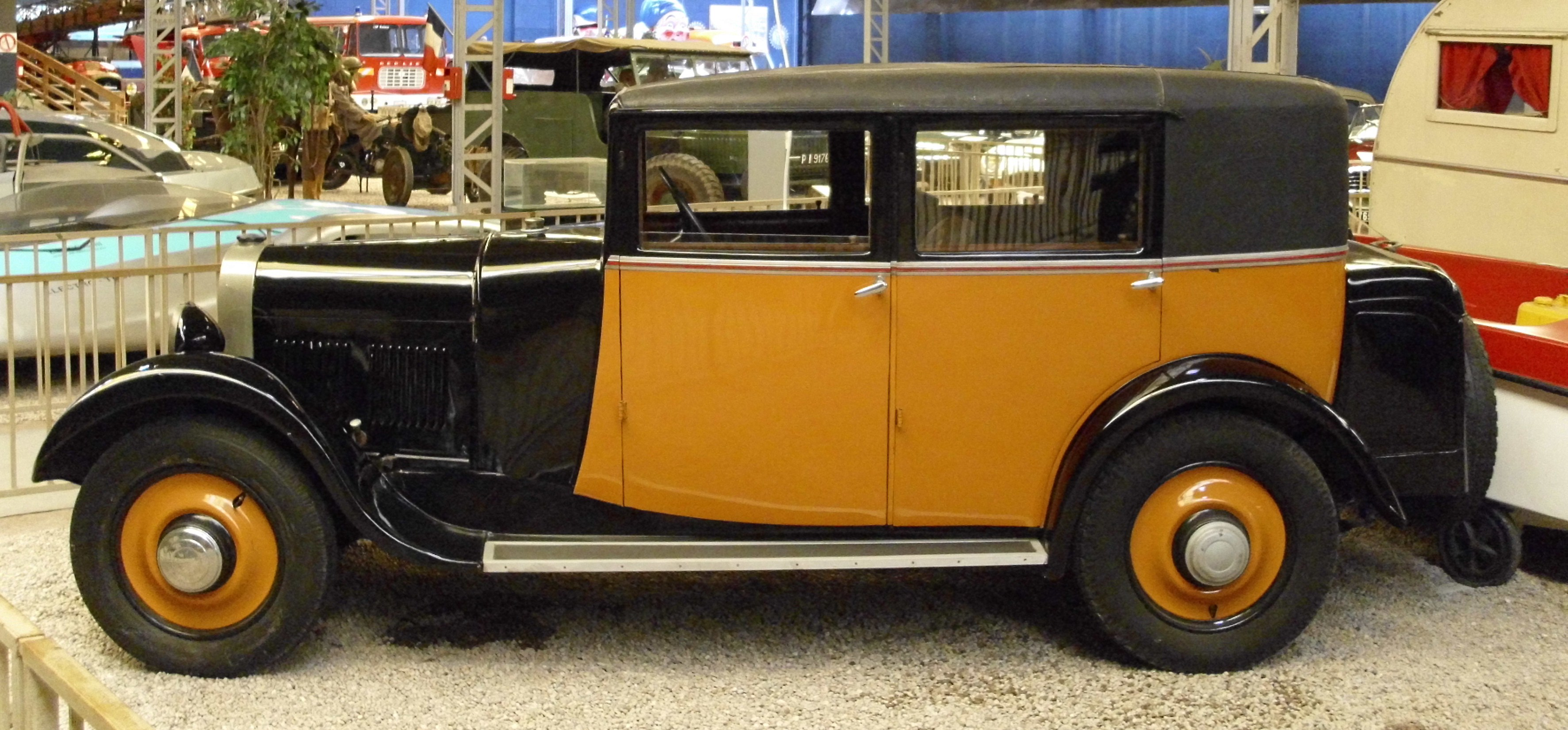
Musée Automobile Reims Champagne

The Michel Irat was a French automobile manufactured from 1929 until 1930 in Paris.

Georges Irat bought the Chaigneau-Brasier company and changed its name to that of his son Michel. Production continued of the old models which used a side valve 1086 cc four-cylinder engine.

In 1930 Georges Irat combined the company with his own larger operation.

At least one example (1929) survives in private ownership in England, whilst another was rumoured to exist in Belgium in 1985.
