= Corre La Licorne =

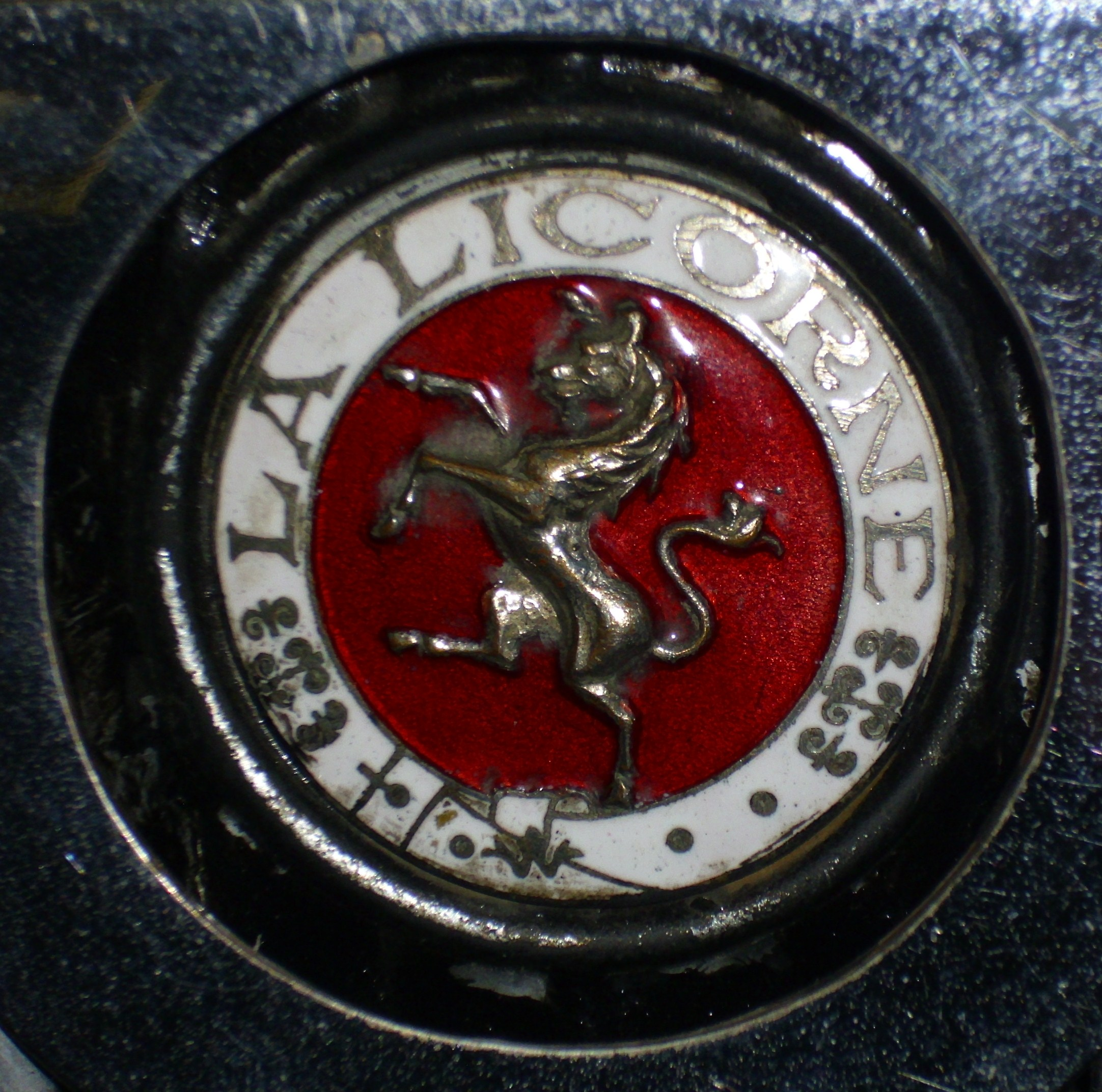
- Industry: Automotive
- Founded: 1901
- Defunct: 1949
- Fate: ceased production
- Headquarters: Levallois-Perret, France
- Key people: Jean-Marie Corre
- Products: Automobiles

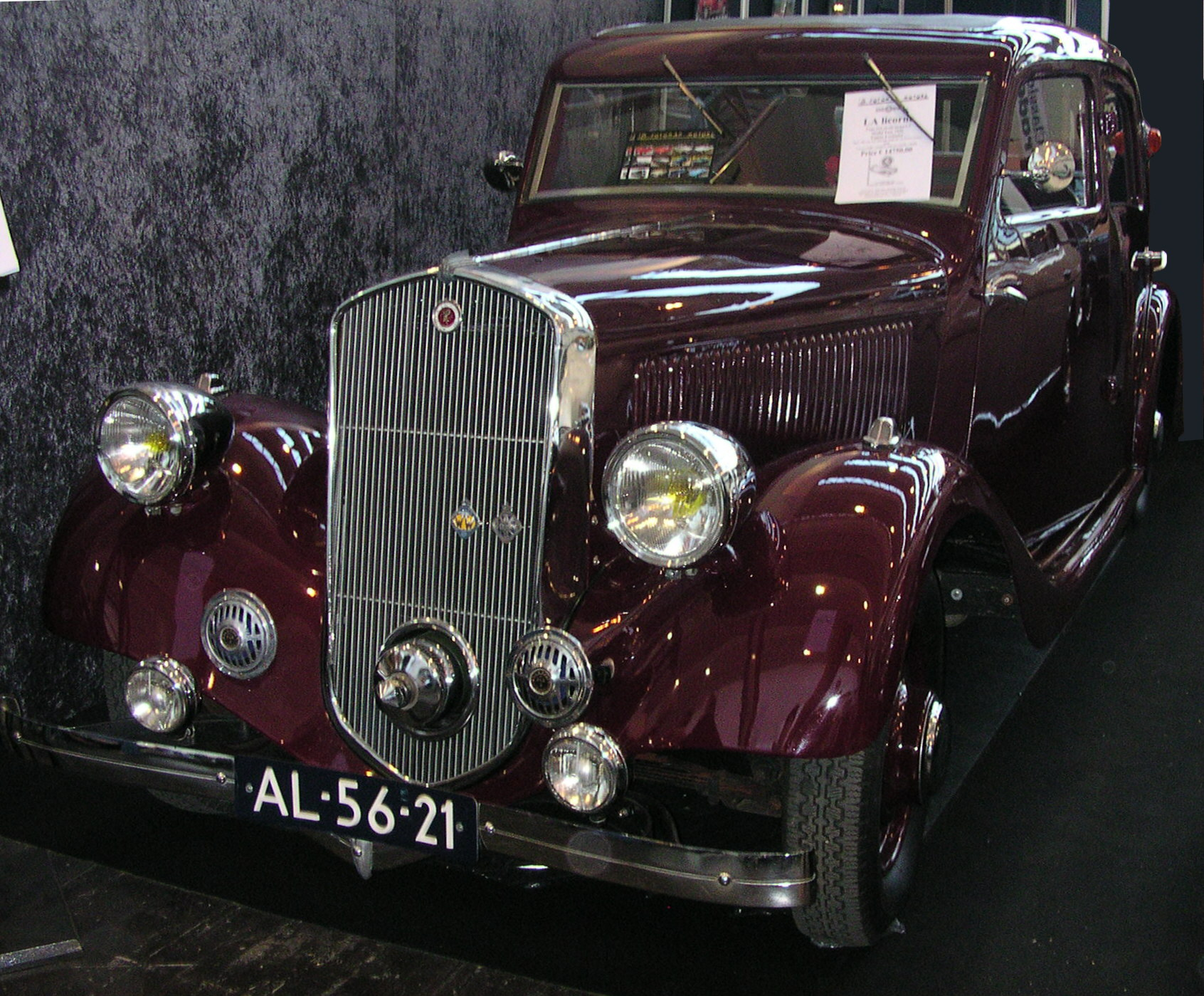
Licorne 415 Rivoli

Corre La Licorne was a French car maker founded 1901 in Levallois-Perret, at the north-western edge of central Paris, by Jean-Marie Corre. Cars were produced until 1947.

== The names ==
The first cars were named Corre, but racing successes by a driver named Waldemar Lestienne, who came from an old family with a crest featuring a unicorn, led to the company adopting the name Corre La Licorne. Nevertheless, this was a long name for a small car, and by the 1950s, even in France, the car was generally remembered simply as the Licorne.

== Beginnings ==
Business began with the production of tricycles and a single-cylinder quadricycle cabriolet using De Dion-Bouton components. Early sales volumes were modest. To give greater prominence to the brand, the company began to participate in competition, and racing victories, in particular in 1903 by the driver Waldemar Lestienne, gave the company valuable recognition. Sales improved and were soon challenging those of longer established brands such as Renault, Peugeot and De Dion-Bouton.

Early on the business was afflicted by litigation and after a trial against Renault that lasted five years. The firm's founder, Jean-Marie Corre, found himself bankrupt and obliged to sell his business to Lestienne Firmin, a skilled financial administrator in 1907. It was at this point that the Corre name was changed to Corre-La Licorne.

In 1910 the model list included three models: one with a single-cylinder engine, one with twin 1.7-liter and a third model powered by a four-cylinder. But by eve of World War I in 1914, the range had already been broadened substantially. The 4-cylinder engines were derived from Ballot and Chapuis-Dornier units.

With the outbreak of war, the business was moved to new premises in nearby Neuilly.

== 1918–1926 ==
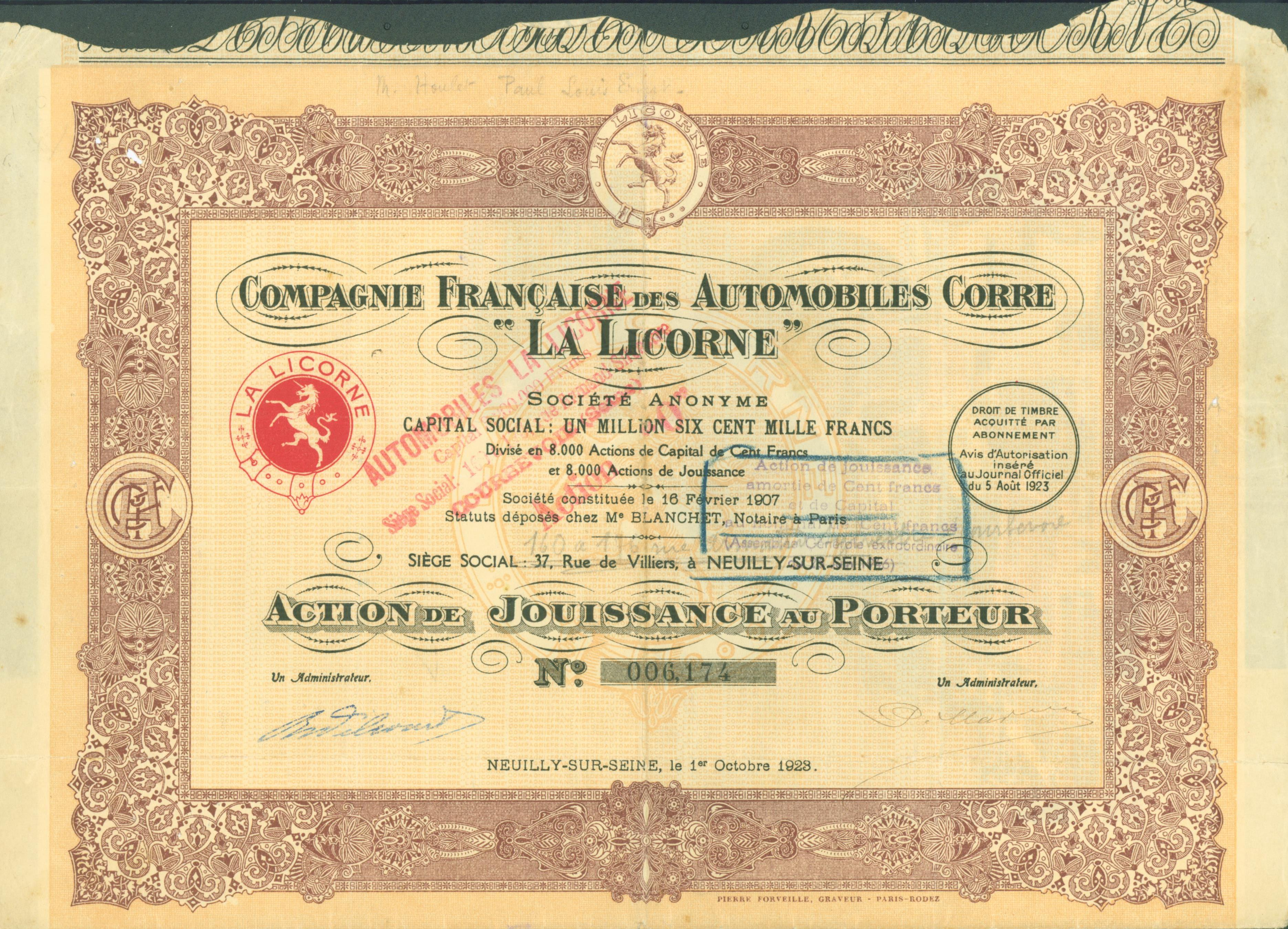
Certificate of the Automobiles Corre "La Licorne" S. A., issued 1 October 1923

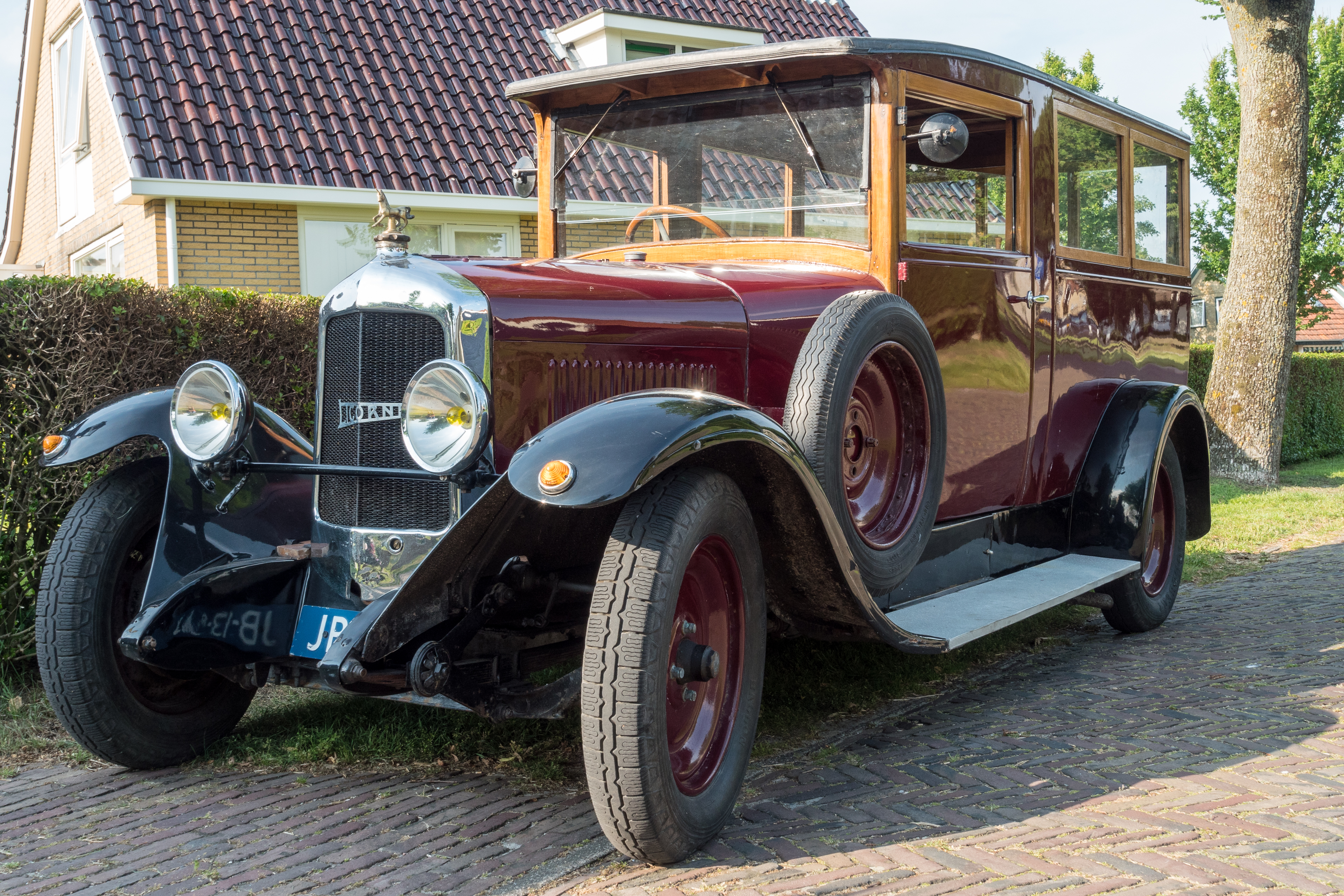
1926 La Licorne B7W4

After the war a new model with a 1.2-liter engine was presented. This was a new version of an earlier model dating back to before the war. By the mid-1920s, the Neuilly manufacturer was offering a wider range, and the cars were joined by new commercial vehicle versions and even small buses.

In rural areas Corre-La Licorne cars were valued by farmers and small businessmen for their robust simplicity and the ease with which they could be maintained, but their reliability and economy also appealed to urban consumers. By the time of the October 1924 Motor Show, the basic Corre-La Licorne passenger vehicle range extended to four mid-range cars, all with four cylinder engines, as follows:

- 1390cc (8CV) with 2,700 mm (110 in) wheelbase, listed at 20,500 francs
- 1685cc (9CV) with 2,890 mm (114 in) wheelbase, listed at 21,400 francs
- 1614cc ohc (10CV) with 2,890 mm (114 in) wheelbase, listed at 26,500 francs
- 2292c (12CV) with 3,310 mm (130 in) wheelbase, listed at 38,000 francs

The prices shown are for a car with a standard body already fitted. In each case the cars were offered with a standard Torpedo-style body designed to seat four or, in the case of the longer 12CV, six people.

== 1927–1939 ==
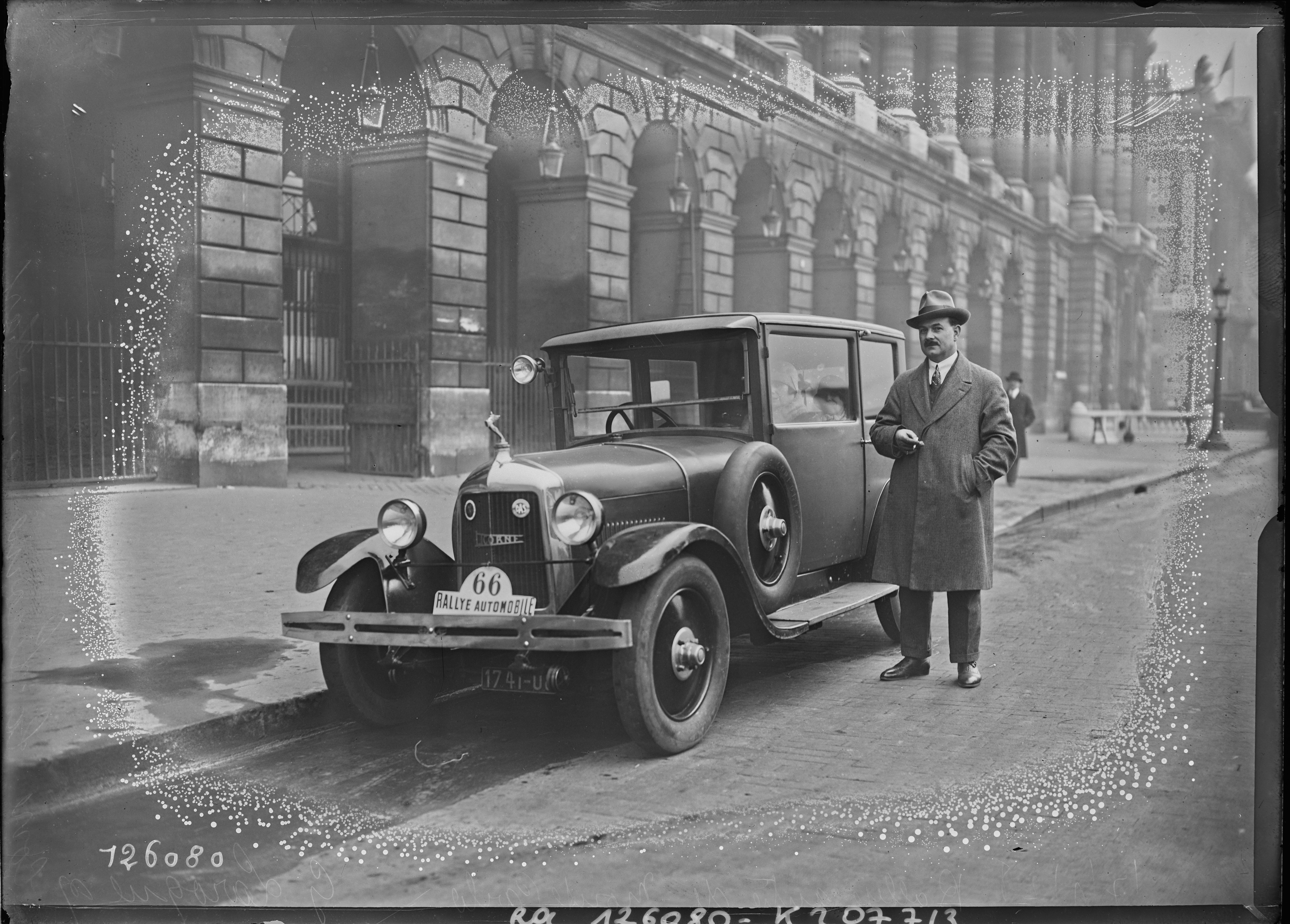
A La Licorne automobile at the 1928 Monte Carlo Rally

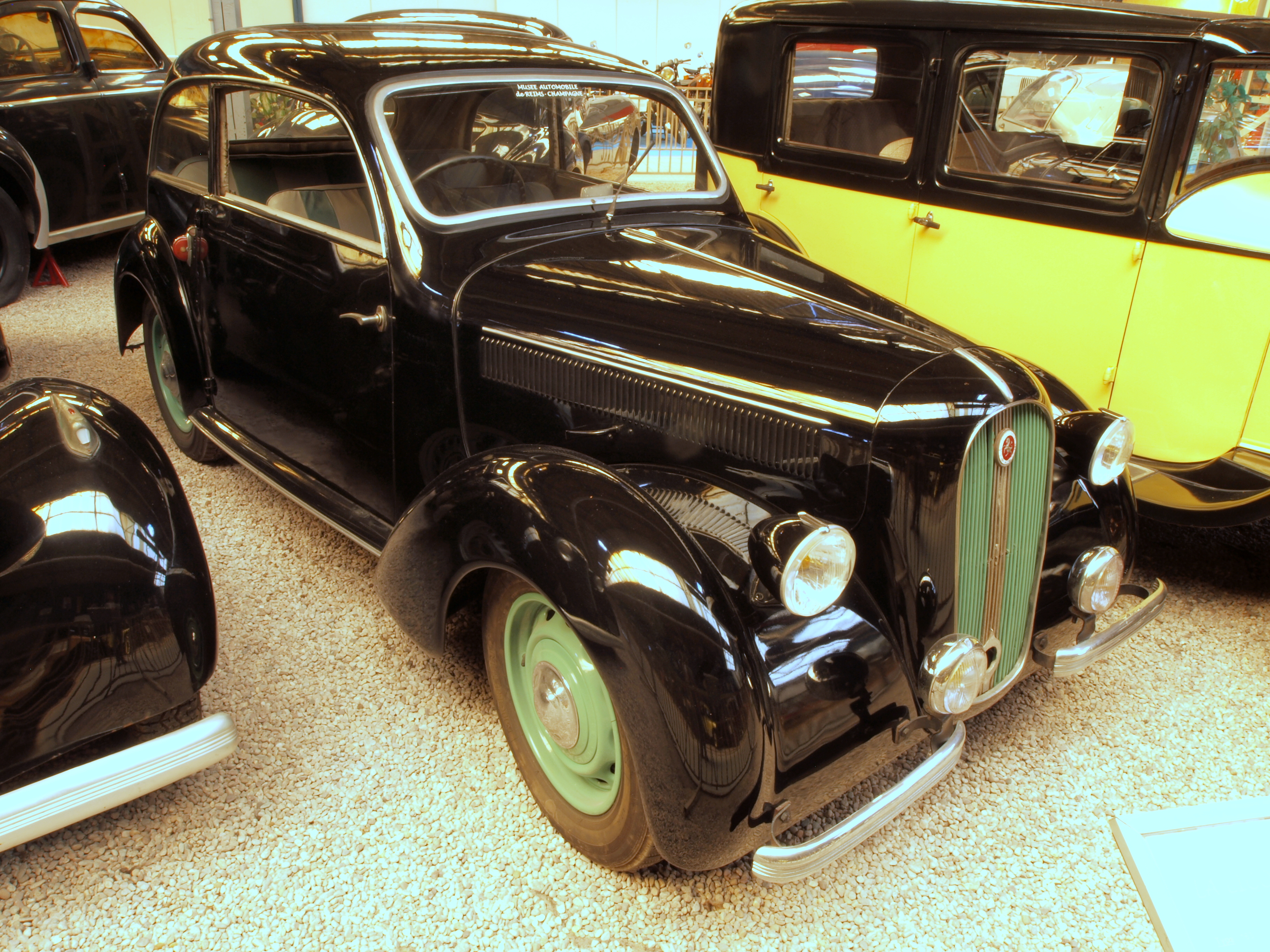
1939 La Licorne 163

In 1927, the factory moved again, this time to Courbevoie. The company began to buy in sub-assemblies from Citroën, as part of a dependency relationship that would be extended in the 1930s. In the same year new 5V and 6CV models were introduced. These would remain in production for a decade.

1932, saw more new model introductions in the small/medium category. The cars were focused on the lower end of the market: they were both well finished and relatively affordable, and they met with some success. By 1935, the range also included slightly larger 10CV and 11CV models.

The switch to all-steel car bodies at the end of the 1920s transformed the economics of auto-production in western Europe. The heavy steel presses now needed to stamp out the body pressings were hugely expensive. Manufacturers not able to afford to buy presses could subcontract steel body production to specialists in volume car body production, notably Chausson, but prices charged by such companies were set to recover their own capital investment costs, and further issues arose from the high capital costs of the individual dies, different for each panel shape produced. At the higher end of the French auto-industry Hotchkiss, still cash rich thanks to their lucrative armaments business, simply purchased their own steel press in 1929. Other higher end automakers responded by moving ever further upmarket, providing cars, as before, in bare chassis form to be bodied by traditional "bespoke" coach-builders who still took a more artisanal approach to producing steel panels.

At least through the 1930s, several French luxury auto-makers were able to survive as low volume producers, dependent for their revenue on a relatively small number of rich customers willing to afford handmade cars. In the small and medium car sectors, larger manufacturers such as Peugeot, Renault and Citroën configured their ranges to reduce the variety of models (and different body shapes) produced, and to introduce a level of commonality between the body panels for different models.

The idea was to produce a sufficient volumes to permit the capital cost of the presses and dies to be amortized over so many units that the selling prices of the individual vehicles remained attractive to customers. The 1930s was a difficult decade for the French auto-industry, during which even Citroën was driven to bankruptcy, surviving only because they were rescued by their largest creditor. For manufacturers of small or mid-market cars, unable to sell steel bodied cars in the volumes needed to finance the capital cost of the presses and dies needed for stamping out the body panels, the squeeze was still more acute.

Respected producers such as Unic and Berliet simply pulled out of passenger car production and reinvented themselves as producers of commercial vehicles. La Licorne, known in the 1920s for producing an unusually wide range of small and mid-market cars, but with less than a 1% share of the French auto-market by the end of the 1920s, confronted the same acute crisis in a different way, entering into an alliance with Citroën.

In Autumn 1936 the manufacturer rebodied their 8CV and 11CV models with a body-shell designed for the Citroën 11 Légère purchased from Citroën. Six months later the Licorne 11CV and 14CV models appeared sharing the body of the Citroën 11 Normale. Six months after that, at the October 1937 Motor Show, Licorne followed the logic of this strategy by launching a version of their Types 316 and 319 badged as the "Licorne Rivoli" sharing not merely the body shells but also the engines of the equivalent Citroën models. There were still differences; the wheelbase on the Licorne car was 10mm shorter than that on the Citroën Traction.

From the outside, the cooling slats cut into the sides of the bonnet/hood were of a more traditional design on the Licorne which also bore a traditional Licorne grille at the front. More significantly, the Licorne retained a traditional rear-wheel drive configuration while the Citroën, famously, was a pioneer of front-wheel drive.

As far as published prices were concerned, The 9CV Licorne Type LSN-316 Rivoli was listed for 26,500 Francs while the saloon/sedan version of the 9CV Citroën 7C was priced at 23,800 Francs. The 11CV Licorne Type LSN-319 Rivoli was priced at 28,500 Francs while an equivalent (albeit front-wheel drive) 2900 mm wheelbase 11CV Citroën 11 Legere was listed at 23,800 Francs.

The French auto-industry did not bounce back from the 1929 economic crash with the same vigour as that experienced in Germany and Britain, but in 1938, with approximately 224,000 passenger cars sold, the car market finally matched the level reached in 1928. For the second tier automakers trying to compete for sales with the market leaders in the small and midsize automobile categories, the news was less encouraging: the 1,972 Licorne cars produced in 1928 had equated to 0.88% of the French auto-market, while the 688 Licorne cars produced in 1938 represented just 0.31% of the market total.

== 1939–1945 ==
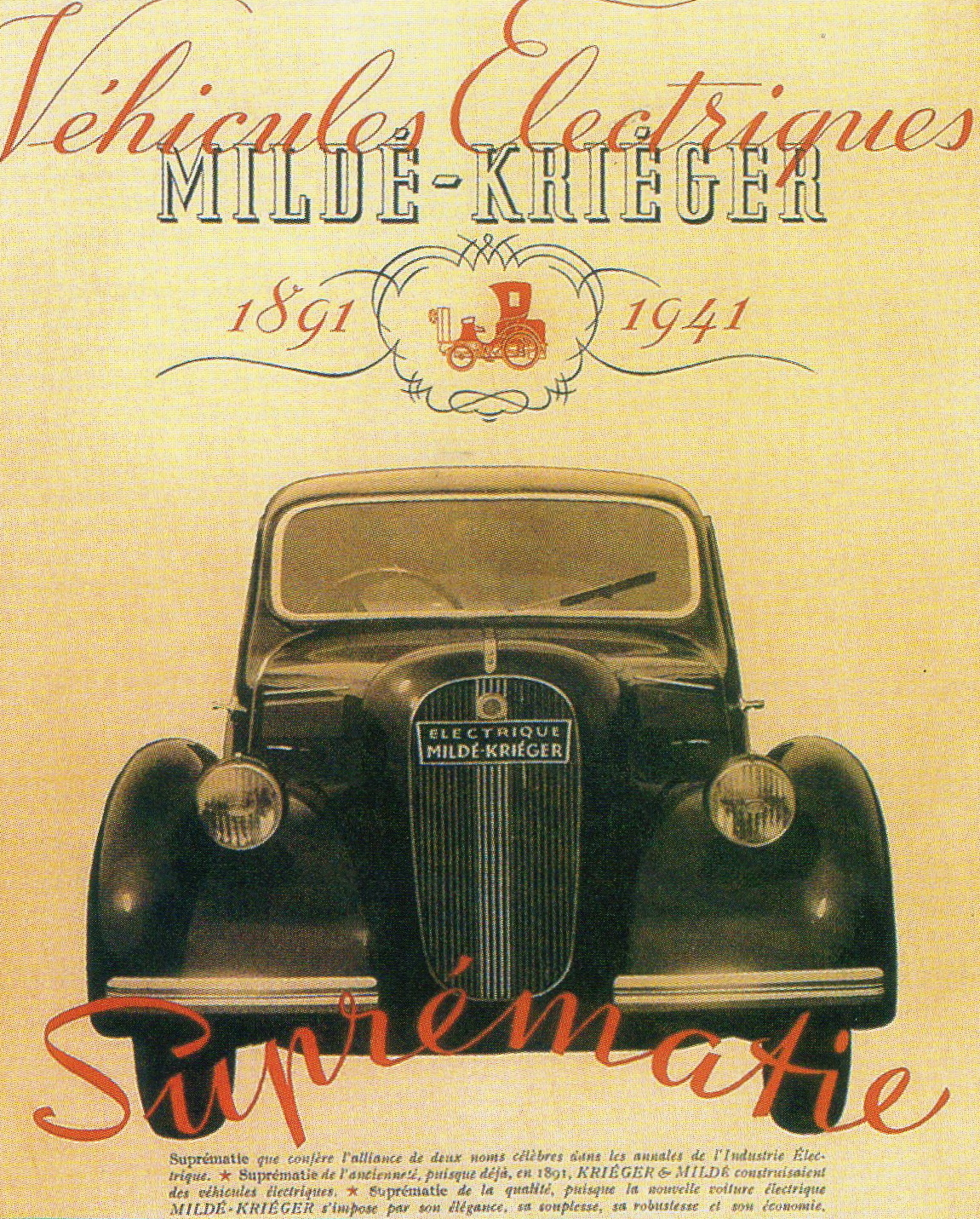
1941 Milde-Kreiger advertisement

During the war, production was limited to a small number of cars of a single model with electric propulsion, using a mechanism devised by Charles Mildé and Louis Kriéger who had been pioneers of electrically powered cars before the First World War. The Licorne 6/8 CV sedan on which the car was based was a conventionally sized small car, so significantly heavier than the cycle cars more usually associated with electric cars in the 1940s. Nevertheless, a range of 90 kilometres (60 miles) and a cruising speed of 40 km/h (25 mph) were quoted. A light van using the same chassis and running gear was also advertised.

== After 1945 ==
The company survived the First World War and the Great Depression, but by the end of the Second World War it was firmly on the critical list. The company was not one of the automakers included in the Pons Plan. The Pons Plan reflected government determination to structure the French auto-industry according to priorities determined by politicians and civil servants: exclusion from it created great difficulties in obtaining necessary permissions and materials.

The company nevertheless took a stand at the Paris Motor Show in October 1947 and exhibited the Licorne Typ 164 LR. Derived from a pre-war car, this was a 8CV medium-sized (by the standards of that time) two-door saloon resembling a slightly more stylish version of the Renault Juvaquatre and powered by a four-cylinder 1,450 cc engine. The top speed of 90 km/h (56 mph) was considered barely adequate, even in 1947. Beside the saloon was displayed a similarly powered cabriolet model which derived from the Licorne Type 415 of 1939.

The models exhibited in 1947 never entered series production although small numbers were turned out until 1949. In 1950 the business shut down.

Records indicate that between 1901 and 1949 the company produced 33,962 cars.

It is possible to see several of the produced cars in museums, for example in the Automobile Museum Reims-Champagne.

== Competition ==
- 1st – Coupe de l'Anjou, 1908, Joseph Collomb
- 1st – Coupe de L'AC du Limousin, 1908, Joseph Collomb
- 1st – Château-Thierry Hill climb (Course de côte), 1908, Voiturette class, Joseph Collomb
- Abdn - Grand Prix automobile de France, 1911, Maurice Fournier, Georges Louvel
- 1st – Tour de France Automobile, 1912, (Joseph Collomb)
- 1st – Gaillon Hill climb (Course de côte), 1920. Voiturette class, Joseph Collomb
- 1st – Grand Prix de Boulogne, 1921, Voiturette class, Joseph Collomb
  - 2nd – Grand Prix de la Marne, 1925, Robert Lestienne
- 1st – Argenteuil Hill climb (Course de côte), 1926, class 1,1 L (Joseph Paul)
- 1st – Grand Prix du Salon, 1927, Michel Doré
- 1st – Coupe voiturettes de l'Armistice (Prix Dunlop) 1927, Michel Doré
- 1st – Château-Thierry Hill climb (Course de côte), 1927 et 1928, Michel Doré
  - 2nd – Coupe de la Commission Sportive, 1927, Michel Doré
  - 2nd – Grand Prix de la Marne, 1927, Michel Doré
  - 2nd – Circuit des Routes Pavées, 1927, Michel Doré
- 1st – Toul-Nancy, 1928, Michel Doré
  - 8th – 1929 Monaco Grand Prix, Michel Doré
- 1st – Argenteuil Hill climb (Course de côte), 1929, Michel Doré
- 1st – Monte Carlo Rally, 1930, (Hector Petit [Hector_Petit])
- 1st – Circuit des Routes Pavées[6 Heures des Routes Pavées], 1931, class 1,1 L (Fernand Vallon)
- 1st – Rallye d'Europe de l'Automobile Club d'Allemagne, 1931, (to Berlin) (new Corre La Licorne 6/8 CV, Petit)
  - 2nd – Bol d'or automobile 1931, (Fernand Vallon)
- 1st – Bol d'or automobile 1932 (Fernand Vallon)
- 1st – Circuit de Torvilliers Voiturettes, 1932, (Fernand Vallon)

Note: French Grand Prix, 1911 – Maurice Fournier died in a crash.
