= Louis-François =

Louis-François or Louis François may refer to:

- Louis François, Prince of Conti (1717–1776), French nobleman
- Louis François, Duke of Anjou (1672–1672)
- Louis François Joseph, Prince of Conti (1734–1814), son of Louis François I
- Louis-François de Bausset (1748–1824), French cardinal and writer
- Louis-François Bertin (1766–1841), French journalist
- Louis-François de Boufflers (1644–1711), Marshal of France
- Louis François Cauchy (1760–1848), French official, father of mathematician Augustin Louis Cauchy
- Louis-François Dunière (1754–1828), businessman in Lower Canada
- Louis-François Richer Laflèche (1818–1898), Roman Catholic Bishop of Trois-Rivières, Quebec, Native American missionary
- Louis-François Lejeune (1775–1848), French general, painter, and lithographer
- Louis François de Pourtalès (1824–1880), American naturalist
- Louis-François Roubiliac (1702–1762), French sculptor
- Louis-François Bertin de Vaux (1771–1842), French journalist, brother of Bertin
- Louis François (wrestler) (1906–1986), French Olympic wrestler

== See also ==
- François-Louis (disambiguation)
