= Georges Irat =

French automobile

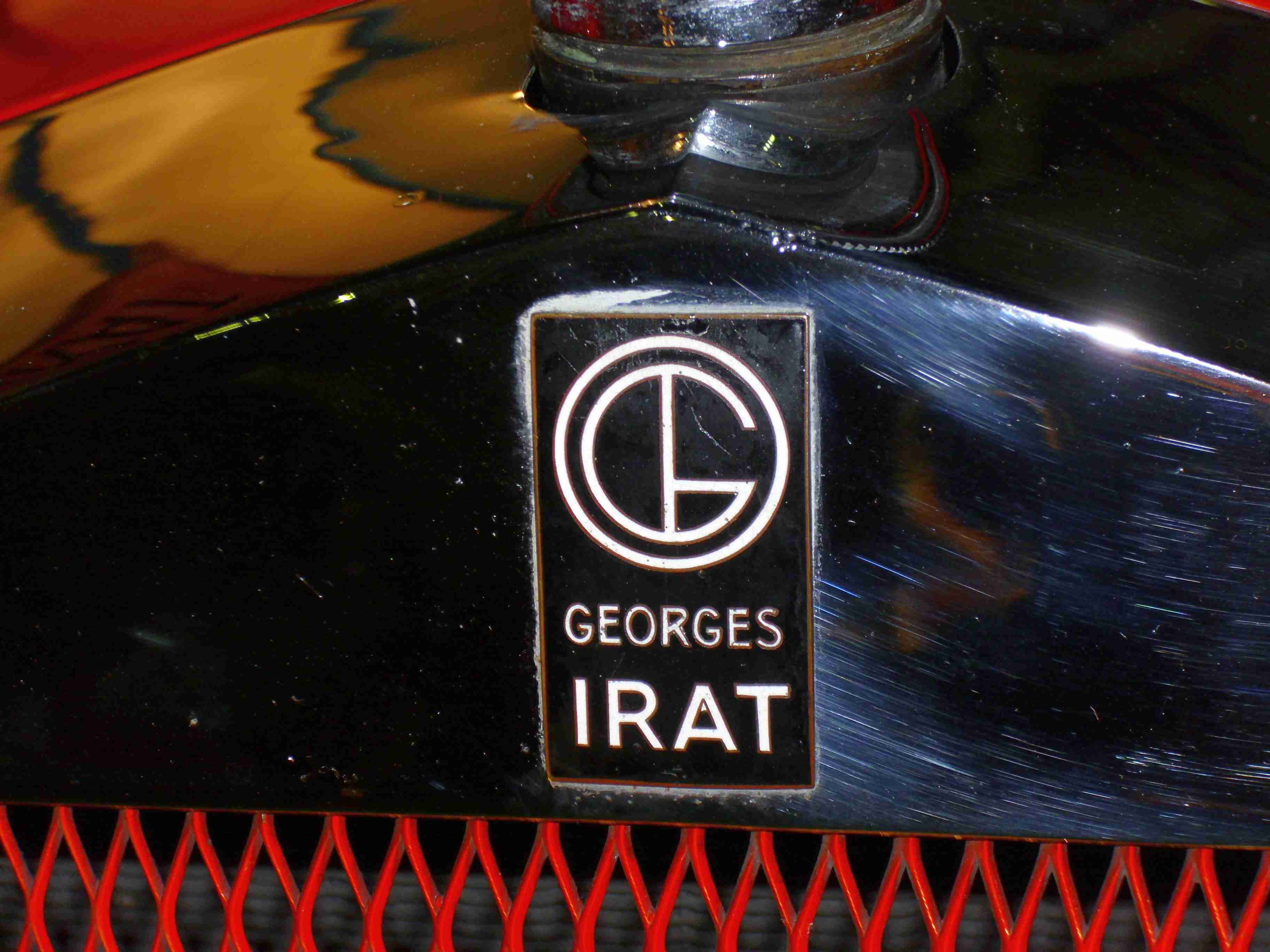

The Georges Irat was a French automobile manufactured by engine builder Georges Irat from 1921 to 1953.

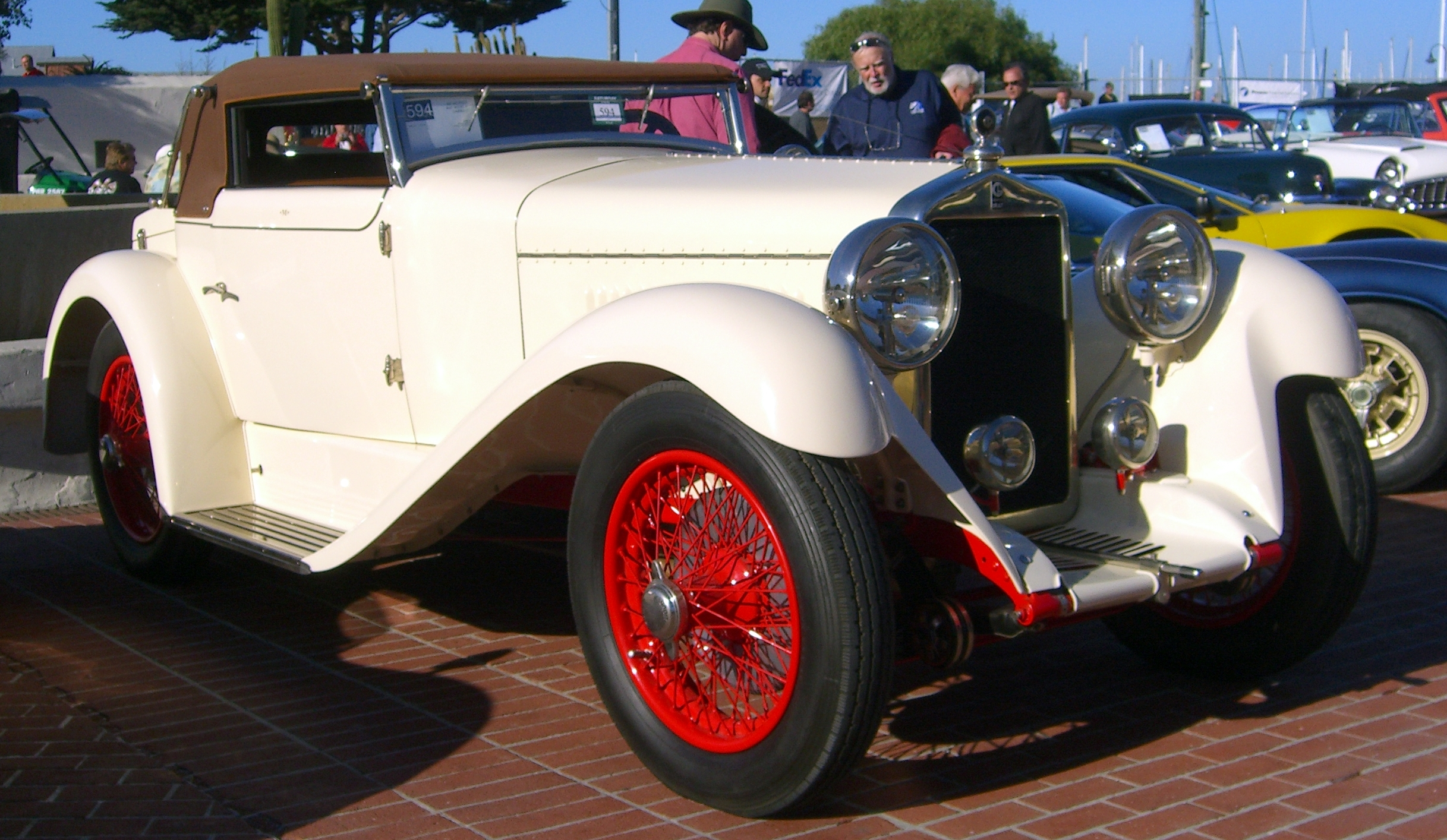
1927 Georges Irat Model A with body by Pourtout

== Between two World Wars ==
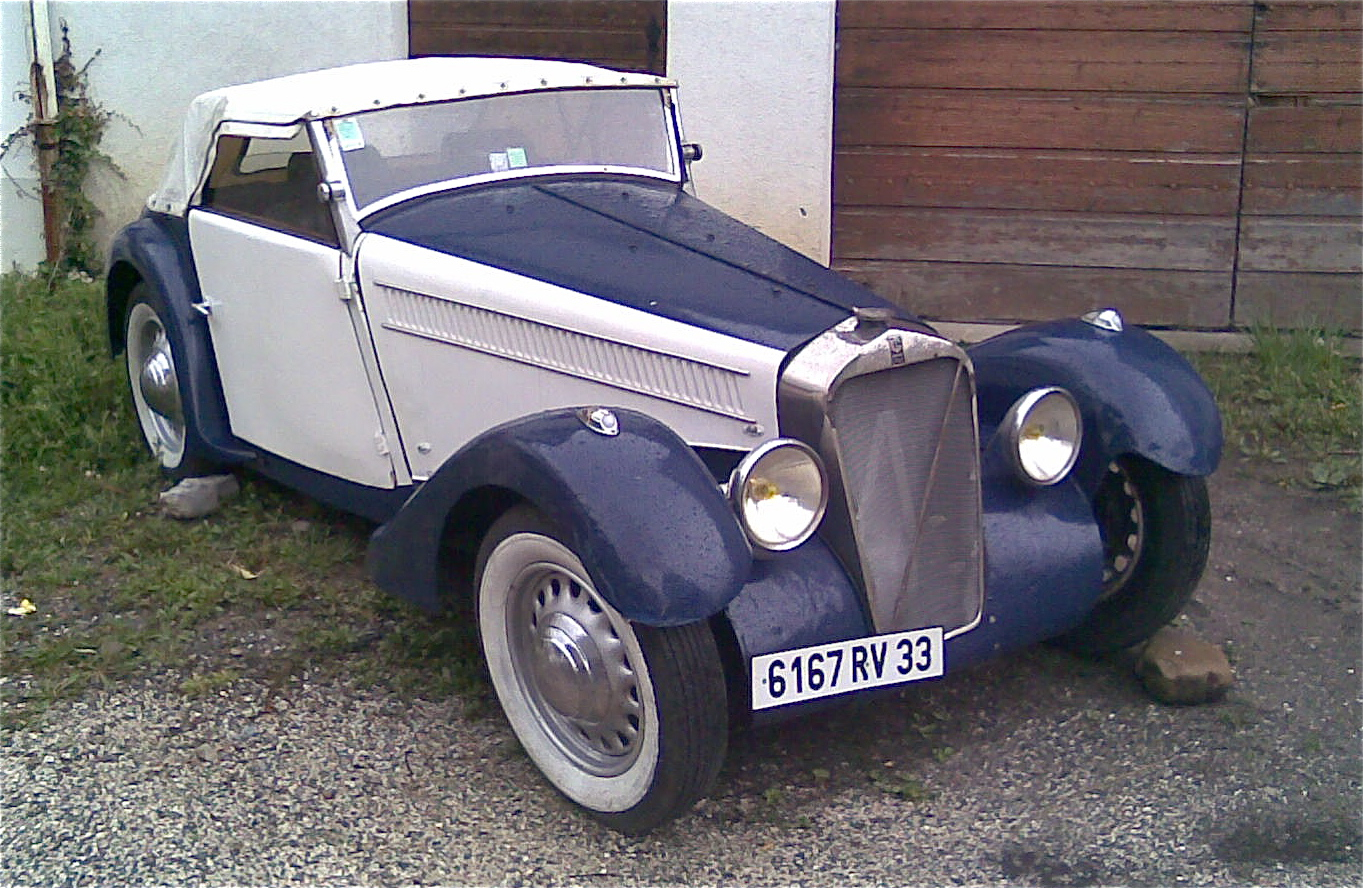
Georges Irat MDU

The company's first product was an ohv 1990cc four-cylinder car designed by Maurice Gaultier who had been with Delage. This was joined in 1926 by a 2985 cc six-cylinder. The company turned to producing Lycoming powered models in 1929, both sixes and eights; this was also the year in which they moved from Chatou to Neuilly. A small car with 1086 cc four-cylinder engine and designed by George's son Michel, was added to the range in 1929 but sales of this and the large cars were poor resulting in a financial crisis.

The manufacturer was partially taken over by Godefroy et Levecque, makers of the Ruby engine, in 1934, consequently moving to that company's works in Levallois. Here they made two front-wheel-drive sporting roadsters, one with an 1100 cc Ruby and the other with a six-cylinder 2450 cc Lycoming engine. The smaller car sold well but there were few takers for the six. In 1938 a new sports car with a 1911 cc engine produced by Citroën with independent suspension using rubber springing on all wheels was announced but war broke out after about 200 had been made.

== During the Second World War ==
After the outbreak of war, Georges Irat was among the first auto-makers to focus on electric cars, there being diminishing quantities of oil based motor-fuel available for civilian use, especially after the German invasion in May/June 1940. An all-new electric car was designed during Summer 1940 and developed rapidly in order to be ready for public launch at the Lyon Fair during the autumn of 1941. The little car was designed to be as light-weight as possible and the electric motor had a number of ingenious features. The vehicle had a top speed of 30–35 km/h (roughly 20 mph) and the lead battery provided for a range of 90-100 kilometres (nearly 60 miles) between charges. Both a small 2-seater cabriolet and a 2-seater mini-van were produced, although most of the rear portion of the car and indeed of the van was permanently occupied by the electric motor and batteries. The first few cars were produced for use by Georges Irat employees, but small batches of the cars were built for sale via an exclusive deal with a car dealer on the Rue de Passy on the western side of central Paris. After the end of 1942 significant levels of auto-production were no longer possible due to the non-availability of materials and labour for civilian production. Production of electric cars did not restart when peace returned in 1945.

== After the Second World War ==
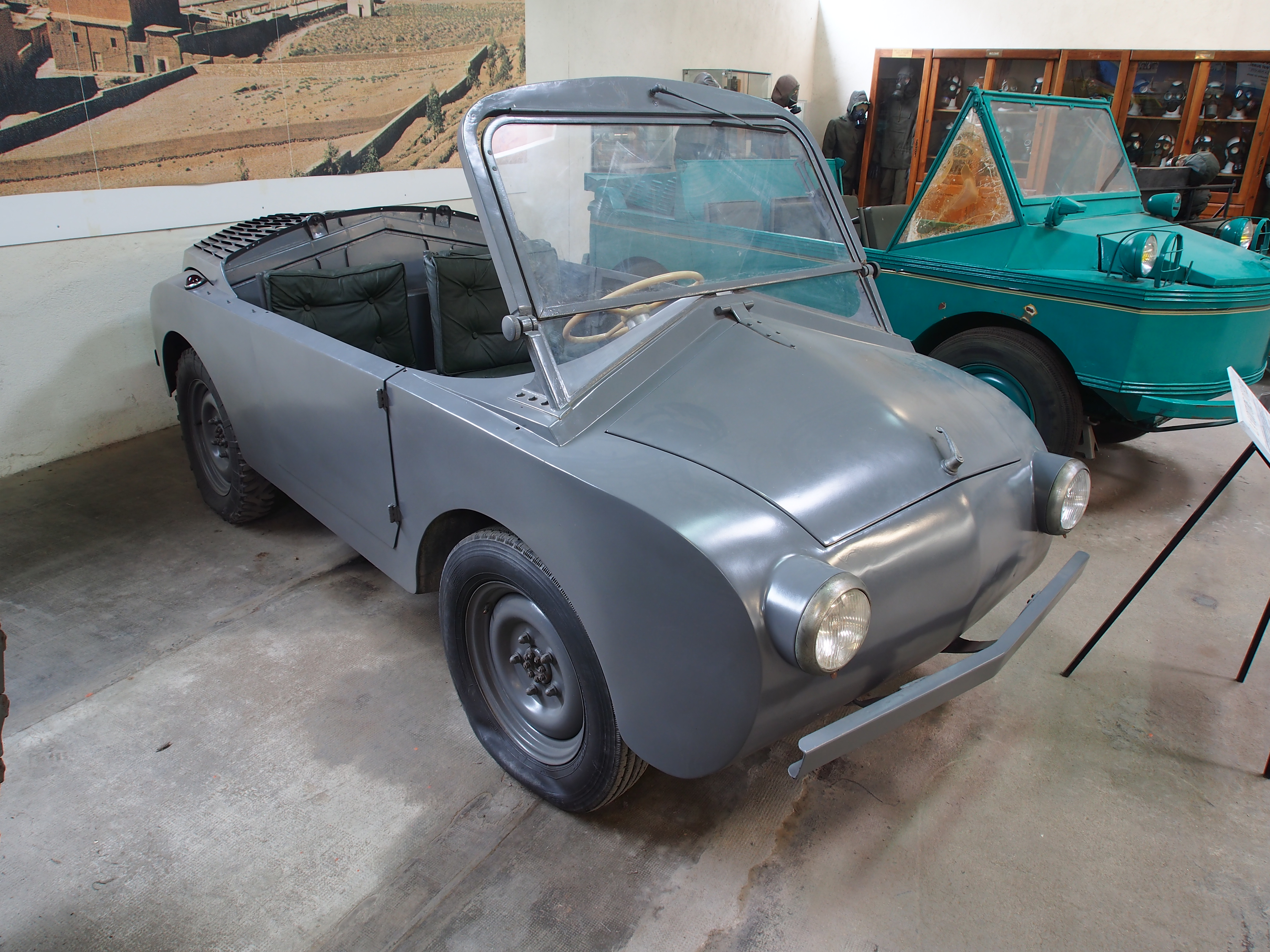
Voiture du Bled (VDB)

A prototype with an 1100 cc flat four engine driving the front wheels was shown at the October 1946 Paris Salon. It reappeared at the 1947 Motor Show looking broadly similar but the front panels were slightly reworked and the headlights were covered over with an extra layer of glass in order to present a smoother profile. Under the bonnet/hood the engine had now been replaced by a 1996 cc 4-cylinder in-line unit featuring a twin overhead camshaft and driving, now, the rear wheels via a more conventional transmission. At this time the French auto-industry was subject to extensive government intervention, and in this dirigiste context Georges Irat thought that the larger-engined car might be classified by the government, which controlled supplies of materials necessary for auto-production, as an "exceptional car reserved in the first instance for export" However, the car never entered production even though it re-appeared at the 1949 show.

In 1950 Georges Irat announced the VdB or "Voiture du Bled" made by a new company, Société Chérifienne George Irat in Casablanca, Morocco. This was a jeep-like three-seat vehicle powered by a rear-mounted Panhard engine. Only a few were made up to 1953. The engine was originally of 610 cc and 28 PS (21 kW), which meant a top speed of 80 km/h (50 mph). It could climb a 40% grade and ford a 60 cm (24 in) deep stream. The vehicle later received updated bodywork, and the car displayed at the 1953 Paris Show had a 745 cc version of the Panhard engine, producing 33 PS (24 kW). With 80 L (21 US gal) and 40 L (11 US gal) in reserve, the effective range of the VdB was 1,500 km (930 mi). It was rear-wheel drive only, but had a locking differential and a low gear transfer case for its three-speed gearbox.
