= Fitzroy Dearborn Publishers =

American academic publisher (1994–2003)

- Status: Defunct
- Founded: 1994
- Founder: Daniel Kirkpatrick and George Walsh
- Successor: Routledge
- Country of origin: United States
- Headquarters location: Chicago
- Publication types: Books
- Nonfiction topics: Reference

Fitzroy Dearborn was an American publisher of academic library reference titles with offices in London and Chicago. It was acquired by Taylor & Francis as an imprint of Routledge Reference in 2002, before Taylor & Francis merged with Informa.

At the time of its sale, the company had a backlist of 350 titles.

== History ==
Fitzroy Dearborn Publishers was founded in 1994 by Daniel Kirkpatrick and George Walsh. The company was a publisher of academic library reference titles with offices in London and Chicago. It was acquired by the UK-based Taylor & Francis Group as an imprint of Routledge Reference in 2002.

At the time of its sale, the company had a backlist of 350 titles, many of them award-winning.

== Name ==
The name of the company was derived from the districts of London and Chicago in which its offices were located, Fitzrovia and Dearborn respectively.

== Titles ==
Fitzroy Dearborn's titles included:

- Dictionary of Artists' Models. ISBN 1-57958-233-8
- Dictionary of Women Artists. ISBN 1-884964-21-4
- Encyclopedia of African History
- Encyclopedia of AIDS. ISBN 1-57958-007-6
- Encyclopedia of Comparative Iconography. ISBN 1-57958-009-2
- Encyclopedia of the Essay. ISBN 1-884964-30-3
- Encyclopedia of Greece and the Hellenic Tradition. ISBN 1-57958-141-2
- Encyclopedia of Historians and Historical Writing. ISBN 1-884964-33-8
- Encyclopedia of Indo-European Culture. ISBN 1-884964-98-2
- Encyclopedia of Interior Design. ISBN 1-884964-19-2
- Encyclopedia of Life Writing. ISBN 1-57958-232-X
- Encyclopedia of Literary Translation into English. ISBN 1-884964-36-2
- Encyclopedia of Mexico. ISBN 1-884964-31-1
- Encyclopedia of Monasticism. ISBN 1-57958-090-4
- Encyclopedia of the Novel. ISBN 1-57958-015-7
- Encyclopedia of the Palestinians. ISBN 1-57958-208-7
- Encyclopedia of Sculpture. ISBN 1-57958-248-6
- Encyclopedia of Television. ISBN 1-884964-26-5
- International Book Publishing An Encyclopedia. ISBN 1-884964-16-8
- Jewish Writers of the Twentieth Century. ISBN 1-57958-313-X
- Reader's Guide to American History. ISBN 1-884964-22-2
- Reader's Guide to the History of Science. ISBN 1-884964-29-X
- Reader's Guide to Lesbian and Gay Studies ISBN 1-57958-142-0
- Reader's Guide to Literature in English. ISBN 1-884964-20-6
- Reader's Guide to Military History. ISBN 1-57958-241-9
- Reader's Guide to the Social Sciences. ISBN 1-57958-091-2
- Reference Guide to Russian Literature. ISBN 1-884964-10-9
