= Atomicity =

Atomicity may refer to:

== Chemistry ==
- Atomicity (chemistry), the total number of atoms present in 1 molecule of a substance
- Valence (chemistry), sometimes referred to as atomicity

== Computing ==
- Atomicity (database systems), a property of database transactions which are guaranteed to either completely occur, or have no effects
- Atomicity (programming), an operation appears to occur at a single instant between its invocation and its response
- Atomicity, a property of an S-expression, in a symbolic language like Lisp

== Mathematics ==
- Atomicity, an element of orthogonality in a component-based system
- Atomicity, in order theory; see Atom (order theory)

== See also ==
- Atom (disambiguation)
