= Atomic =

Atomic may refer to:

- Of or relating to the atom, the smallest particle of a chemical element that retains its chemical properties
- Atomic physics, the study of the atom
- Atomic Age, also known as the "Atomic Era"
- Atomic scale, distances comparable to the dimensions of an atom
- Atom (order theory), in mathematics
- Atomic (coffee machine), a 1950s stovetop coffee machine
- Atomic (cocktail), a champagne cocktail
- Atomic (magazine), an Australian computing and technology magazine
- Atomic Skis, an Austrian ski producer
- Atomic (TV series) a British TV serial

== Music ==
- Atomic (band), a Norwegian jazz quintet
- Atomic (Lit album), 2001
- Atomic (Mogwai album), 2016
- Atomic, an album by Rockets, 1982
- Atomic (EP), by Labrinth, 2013
- "Atomic" (song), by Blondie, 1979
- "Atomic", a song by Tiger Army from Tiger Army III: Ghost Tigers Rise

== See also ==
- Atom (disambiguation)
- Atomicity (database systems)
- Atomism, philosophy about the basic building blocks of reality
- Atomic City (disambiguation)
- Atomic formula, a formula without subformulas
- Atomic number, the number of protons found in the nucleus of an atom
- Atomic chess, a chess variant
- Atomic operation, in computer science
- Atomic TV, a channel launched in 1997 in Poland
- History of atomic theory
- Nuclear power
- Nuclear weapon
- Nuclear (disambiguation)
