= Atomos =

Atomos (Greek undivided) may refer to:

- The Ancient Greek term for the ultimate particles of matter; see Atomic theory
- Atomos (album), a 2014 album by A Winged Victory for the Sullen
- Atomos (magician), a Cypriot magician who appeared in Antiquities of the Jews by Josephus
- Madame Atomos, a fictional villain in a series of novels by André Caroff
- 8th Atomos, two EPs (2008 and 2009) by Seo Taiji
- Atomos (company), digital imaging
- Atomos (hypervisor), hypervisor software

== See also ==
- Atom (disambiguation)
