= Atomic City =

Atomic City may refer to:

== Places ==
- Atomic City, Idaho, a city in Bingham County, Idaho
- Oak Ridge, Tennessee, a city in Anderson and Roane Counties, Tennessee
- A nickname for Las Vegas earned in the 1950s when it was the observation site of above-ground nuclear weapons testing at the Nevada Test Site.
- A nickname for Piqua, Ohio, from it having the first municipal nuclear power plant
- Nilore, Islamabad, Nilore nicknamed "Northern Atomic City" hosted an apex scientific research in the 1960s led under Abdus Salam in Pakistan and it was established in 1960's as a research site for nuclear technology.

== Entertainment ==
- "Atomic City" (Holly Johnson song)
- "Atomic City" (U2 song)
- The Atomic City, a 1952 film
- "Atomic City", a 2016 episode of Timeless (TV series)

== See also ==
- Soviet closed city sites for nuclear development, power, production, research
- Atomic (disambiguation)
- City (disambiguation)
- Nuketown (disambiguation)
