= Atom (disambiguation) =

An atom is a basic unit of matter consisting of a nucleus within a cloud of one or more electrons.

Atom(s) may also refer to:

== Mathematics ==
- Atom (time), a medieval unit of time
- Atom (measure theory), a minimal measurable set
- Atom (order theory)
- Atomic formula, a single predicate in first-order logic
- Atom, an urelement in set theory

== Computing ==
=== Hardware ===
- Intel Atom, a line of microprocessors
- Atom (system on chip), an Intel system on chip platform for smartphones and tablets
- Acorn Atom, an early 1980s home computer

=== Software ===
- Atom (web standard), an XML-based web syndication format
- Atom (programming language), a programming language for real-time embedded software
- Atom (text editor), a deprecated programming text editor developed by GitHub
- AtoM (archival software), an open source software for archival description and access
- Atoms, a fundamental scalar data type in the Lisp programming language, see Lisp (programming language)#Atoms
- A synonym for symbol in some programming languages

== Transport ==
- Ariel Atom, a high performance sports car
- Aston Martin Atom, a 1939 prototype car
- ATOM (IFV), an infantry fighting vehicle jointly developed by Russia and France
- Ozone Atom, a French paraglider design

== Literature ==
- Atom (Asimov book), 1991 nonfiction book by Isaac Asimov
- Atom (Krauss book), 2001 nonfiction book by Lawrence M. Krauss
- Atom (character), the name of several superheroes in DC Comics
- Atom: The Beginning, Japanese manga series
- Captain Atom, a Charlton Comics superhero
- Atom, the narrator of The History and Adventures of an Atom satire by Tobias Smollett

== Music ==
- Atom™, an alias of the German musician Uwe Schmidt (born 1968)
- Atom, an album by Moonbeam
- A.T.O.M (A Twist of Modern), an album by Carbon/Silicon
- "Atom", a song by British Sea Power
- "Atom," a song by Cannibal Ox from The Cold Vein
- Atomi, a Yugoslav rock band

== People ==
- Atom (martyr), a Christian martyr
- Arthur Thomson (fanzines) or ATom (1927–1990), British science fiction artist and writer
- Atom Araullo, a Filipino broadcast journalist
- Atom Egoyan, a Canadian stage and film director, writer and producer
- Maxwell Atoms (born 1974), American animator

== Sports teams ==
- Philadelphia Atoms, American soccer team (1973–1976)
- Philadelphia Atoms SC, American soccer team (founded 2017)
- Jersey City Atoms, American basketball team
- Tri-City Atoms, various American minor league baseball teams from Washington
- Pohang Atoms, a former name of the Pohang Steelers, Korean association football team
- Atoms, the sports teams of Annandale High School in Virginia

== Film and television ==
- A.T.O.M. (TV series), a toy line or its associated animated series
- Atom.com, a former on-line video producer, formerly AtomFilms
  - Atom TV, a television series featuring content from Atom.com
- Springfield Atoms, the fictional football team from Springfield in The Simpsons
- The Atom (1918 film), a 1918 silent film directed by Frank Borzage
- "Atoms", a Series A episode of the television series QI (2003)

== Other uses ==
- Atom Bank, a digital finance company
- Ancient Teachings of the Masters, a new religious movement
- The Atom (sculpture), in Pendle, Lancashire, England
- A British publisher owned by Little, Brown Book Group
- An object lacking proper parts; see Mereology § Axioms and primitive notions
- Atoms (brand), a footwear brand
- Walter Atom, Czechoslovak aircraft engine
- ATOM Myanmar, Burmese telecommunications company

== See also ==
- Atom and His Package, a band whose sole human member is Adam Goren
- Atomic (disambiguation)
- Atomicity (disambiguation)
- Atomism, philosophy about the basic building blocks of reality
- Nuclear (disambiguation)
- Atum, an ancient Egyptian deity
- Adam (disambiguation)
