= Nuketown (disambiguation) =

Nuketown is a multiplayer map featured in Call of Duty: Black Ops.

Nuketown may also refer to:

- "Nuketown" (song), a 2019 song by Ski Mask the Slump God featuring Juice Wrld

== See also ==
- Soviet closed city sites for nuclear development, power, production, research
- Atomic City (disambiguation)
