= Ambident (chemistry) =

In chemistry, ambident is a molecule or group that has two alternative and interacting reaction sites, to either of which a bond may be made during a reaction.

== Ambident dienophile ==
Ambident dienophile 57 reacts with DAPC 54 at the cyclobutene π-bond to produce ligand 58; in contrast, the related ambident dienophile 59 reacts with DAPC 54 at the naphthoquinone π-center to produce adduct 60 (lack of shielding of the methylene protons supports the stereochemical assignment).

== Ambident Nucleophile ==
An Ambident nucleophile refers to an anionic nucleophile that exhibits resonance delocalization of its negative charge over two unlike atoms or over two like but non-equivalent atoms. Enolate ions are Ambident Nucleophile.
