= Allomerism =

Allomerism is the similarity in the crystalline structure of substances of different chemical composition.
