= Condosity =

Measurement of electrical conductivity of a solution

Condosity is a comparative measurement of electrical conductivity of a solution.

The condosity of any given solution is defined as the molar concentration of a sodium chloride (NaCl) solution that has the same specific electrical conductance as the solution under test.

By way of example, for a 2 Molar potassium chloride (KCl) solution, the condosity would be expected to be somewhat greater than 2.0. This is because potassium is a better conductor than sodium.

== Applications ==
The measurement is sometimes used in biological systems to provide an assessment of the properties of bodily or cellular liquids, or the properties of solutes in the physical environment. When measuring the properties of bodily fluids such as urine, condosity is expressed in units of millimoles per litre (mM/L).
