= Atomic (coffee machine) =

Trademark brand of coffee machine

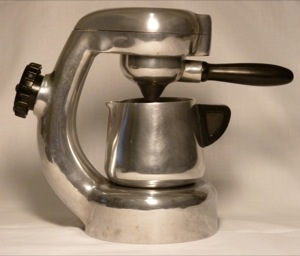
Brevetti Robbiati Model "A"

Atomic is a brand of coffee machine. Both stove-top devices and electrical versions were produced under the name.

The trademark was applied unrelated to their function or design by four different manufacturers in Italy (Brevetti Robbiati), Austria (Stella - Desider Josef Stern was the trademark holder), Hungary (Szigony M.V.), United Kingdom ( A.&M.G. Sassoon).

In Italy, Giordano Robbiati applied a small yellow sticker bearing the Atomic trademark on a small copper and aluminium moka pot. Most of the aluminium cast Model A (flathead) and B (Roundhead) had a black and white circular Atomic badge. As for the Isomac "La splendida", it wore a black sticker Atomic cappuccino which was applied on both white and red models.

In Austria, Desider Stern applied the trademark on various models starting with the 102, 104, 105 and 110 and extending to the 402E series. The inventions related to the Model 105, 110 and 402E were patented by Desider Stern.

The Qualital company in Hungary produced another range of Atomic trademarked machines, which are similar in shape to the Model A of Brevetti Robbiati and the Model 102 of the Stella company, since Desider Stern was Power of Attorney of Giordano Stern and could use the License on the patented Model A.

In the United Kingdom, the A & M.G Sassoon Co. produced its own British-manufactured coffee makers "standard" and "Cappucino" around 1955–1965 that also bore the trademark "Atomic". An example is now on display in the Science Museum in London.
