= Atom (infantry fighting vehicle) =

ATOM
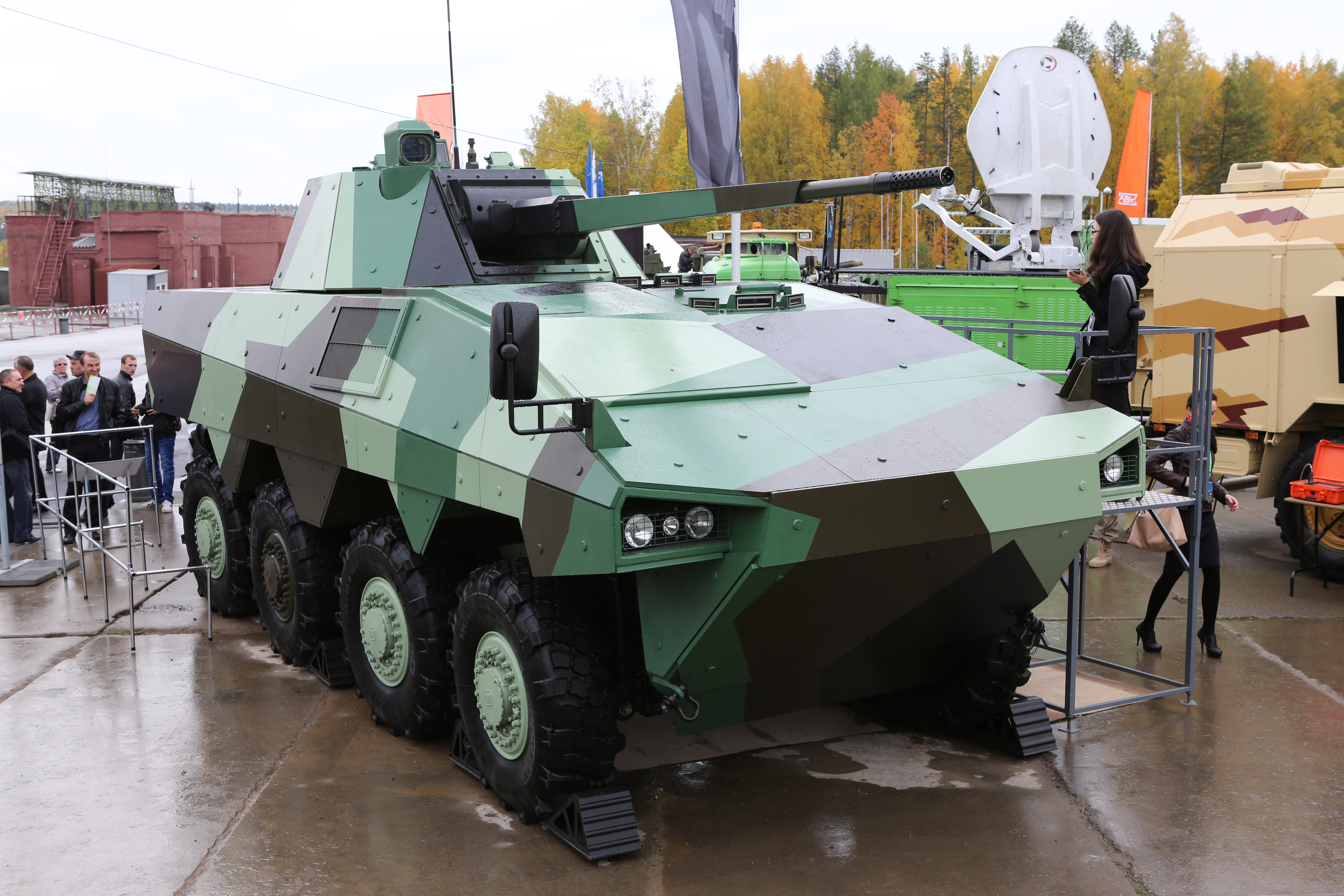
- The ATOM at the 2013 Russian Arms Expo
- Type: Infantry fighting vehicle
- Place of origin: France; Russia

Service history
- Used by: Russia, Prototype

Production history
- Designer: Renault Trucks; JSC "Central Research Institute" Petrel
- Designed: 2013–14
- Manufacturer: Uralvagonzavod
- Produced: since 2013

Specifications (ATOM)
- Mass: 32 t (35 short tons; 31 long tons) (maximum)
- Length: 8.2 m (26 ft 11 in)
- Width: 2.5 m (8 ft 2 in)
- Height: 3 m (9 ft 10 in)
- Crew: 3
- Passengers: 8
- Armor: Up to NATO level 5 STANAG 4569
- Main armament: 57x347mmSR BM-57 rifled autocannon
- Engine: Renault diesel engine 600 hp
- Power/weight: ≥18.75 hp/tonne
- Payload capacity: 7 t (7.7 short tons; 6.9 long tons)
- Suspension: Independent
- Ground clearance: 600 mm (24 in)
- Operational range: 750 km (470 mi)
- Maximum speed: 100 km/h (62 mph) (on even roads)

The ATOM is a heavy 8×8 infantry fighting vehicle (IFV) jointly developed by the Russian company Petrel (a division of Uralvagonzavod) and the French company Renault Trucks. The vehicle is established on the basis of the French Véhicule blindé de combat d'infanterie (VBCI) IFV which is produced by Renault. The prototype of the ATOM was first unveiled during the 2013 Russian Arms Expo at Nizhny Tagil, equipped with a unique fighting module.

On 8 April 2014, Volvo (the parent company of Renault Trucks) froze the joint project of Renault Trucks with Uralvagonzavod. Renault Trucks required consent from the Swedish government to install the engines for the vehicle and were declined because of "uncertainty" according to the Swedish side. The project of cooperation with Uralvagonzavod came under harsh criticism after the 2014 Russian invasion of Ukraine and annexation of its Crimean peninsula. On 18 June 2014, a spokesman for Renault Trucks told IHS Jane's that the program remains frozen, despite contradicting claims given by Rosoboronexport deputy director general Igor Sevastianov.

After the withdrawal of Renault, UVZ continued the project alone. It was planned to make an appearance at the Russian Arms Expo in September 2015.

== Design ==
The ATOM is based on a modified chassis of the French 8×8 VCBI featuring an automatic gearbox and transmission with independent suspension. The chassis, drive with independent suspension, and fire control system are developed and implemented by Renault Trucks while the artillery turret gun is designed by Petrel. In the front of the vehicle, the driver's compartment is located on the left side and power pack on the right side. In the center, the combat compartment is located. The crew consists of three people and eight passengers can be carried. The hinged ramp at the rear of the chassis and four hatches located on the roof serve as an entry and exit point for the vehicle's crew and passengers. The volume of the interior passenger compartment is 10.7 cubic meters.

The ATOM can be equipped with reactive armor and slat armor. Depending on the configuration, this vehicle has up to 5 levels of ballistic protection. The vehicle's armour is expected to provide protection up to STANAG 4569 level 5 which means it is protected against 25 mm armor-piercing projectiles. The same machine can be equipped with CBRN protection against weapons of mass destruction. An active protection system and laser warning devices can also be installed.

The only weapon the ATOM prototype possesses is a 57 mm BM-57 automatic gun. This rifled autocannon is a modification of the Soviet 57 mm S-60, developed by the company Petrel. This high caliber autocannon has an effective range of 6 km and fires at a rate of 120–140 rds/min. The turret traverses 360° across the azimuth and has an elevation range between −8° and +70°. 80–100 rounds are carried within the turret with an additional 100 stowed away. The 57 mm automatic cannon provides engagement of light armoured and soft targets, ATGM crews, and even aerial targets (UAVs, precision-guided munitions, aircraft and helicopters). It takes 1–3 seconds to change the type of munition for the cannon.

== Variants ==
The ATOM IFV will be offered in several variants to meet the requirements of future customers. These variants include: a troop transport vehicle which was shown at the RAE-2013, an infantry combat vehicle armed with a 120 mm mortar or anti-tank missile launchers, an ambulance, a breakdown vehicle, and an armored police vehicle. Certain versions are also designed to be amphibious and air-droppable via Il-76.
