= Atomicity (chemistry) =

Total number of atoms present in a molecule

Atomicity is the total number of atoms present in a molecule of an element. For example, each molecule of oxygen (O_{2}) is composed of two oxygen atoms. Therefore, the atomicity of oxygen is 2.

In older contexts, atomicity is sometimes equivalent to valency. Some authors also use the term to refer to the maximum number of valencies observed for an element.

== Classifications ==
Based on atomicity, molecules can be classified as:

- Monoatomic (composed of one atom). Examples include He (helium), Ne (neon), Ar (argon), and Kr (krypton). All noble gases are monoatomic.
- Diatomic (composed of two atoms). Examples include H_{2} (hydrogen), N_{2} (nitrogen), O_{2} (oxygen), F_{2} (fluorine), and Cl_{2} (chlorine). Halogens are usually diatomic.
- Triatomic (composed of three atoms). Examples include O_{3} (ozone).
- Tetratomic (composed of 4 atoms), Pentatomic (composed of 5 atoms), Hexatomic (composed of 6 atoms), Heptatomic (composed of 7 atoms), Octatomic (composed of 8 atoms)

Atomicity may vary in different allotropes of the same element.

The exact atomicity of metals, as well as some other elements such as carbon, cannot be determined because they consist of a large and indefinite number of atoms bonded together. They are typically designated as having an atomicity of 2.

The atomicity of homonuclear molecule can be derived by dividing the molecular weight by the atomic weight. For example, the molecular weight of oxygen is 31.999, while its atomic weight is 15.879; therefore, its atomicity is approximately 2 (31.999/15.879 ≈ 2).

== Examples ==
There is no general variation in atomicity. It depends on the type of bonding the atom makes with itself to form the molecule of that particular element. The most common values of atomicity for the first 30 elements in the periodic table are as follows:

Atomic Number	Element	Atomicity
1	Hydrogen (H)	2
2	Helium (He)	1
3	Lithium (Li)	1
4	Beryllium (Be)	1
5	Boron (B)	1
6	Carbon (C)	1
7	Nitrogen (N)	2
8	Oxygen (O)	2
9	Fluorine (F)	2
10	Neon (Ne)	1
11	Sodium (Na)	1
12	Magnesium (Mg)	1
13	Aluminium (Al)	1
14	Silicon (Si)	1
15	Phosphorus (P)	4
16	Sulphur (S)	8
17	Chlorine (Cl)	2
18	Argon (Ar)	1
19	Potassium (K)	1
20	Calcium (Ca)	1
21	Scandium (Sc)	1
22	Titanium (Ti)	1
23	Vanadium (V)	1
24	Chromium (Cr)	1
25	Manganese (Mn)	1
26	Iron (Fe)	1
27	Cobalt (Co)	1
28	Nickel (Ni)	1
29	Copper (Cu)	1
30	Zinc (Zn)	1
