= List of Orenstein & Koppel steam locomotives =

The list of Orenstein & Koppel steam locomotives shows photographically documented samples of representative Orenstein & Koppel (O&K) steam locomotives. The factory produced 14,387 steam locomotives from 1899 to 1945 at its Berlin site (Drewitz, Nowawes, Babelsberg) with the works number range from 337 to 12965.

| Works No | Year | Photo | Wheel arrangement | Gauge | Power | Use |
|---|---|---|---|---|---|---|
| 109 | 1895 | | 0-4-0 | 750 mm (2 ft 5 1/2 in) | 45 hp | Irinowska railway, Saint Petersburg N° 6 |
| 226–228 | 1897 | | 2-4-0 | 1,435 mm (4 ft 8 1/2 in) | 150 hp | Vemb-Lemvig-Thyborøn Railway, Denmark |
| 302 | 1898 | | 0-4-0 | 750 mm (2 ft 5 1/2 in) | 50 hp | Sugar factory Tapiau, construction of Zurich Airport, VEBA, Latvia Tp782, preserved at private owner, Rorschach, Switzerland, Täuffelen |
| 366 | 1899 | | 0-4-0 | 600 mm (1 ft 11 5/8 in) | 20 hp | Delivered via the O&K sales office in Budapest to Earl Károly Imre in Nagymágócs near Oroszhaza. 1941 used at the fortifications in Szolyva and in 1945 returned to Mattersburg in Austria. Now being operated in Feld- und Industriebahnmuseum Freiland, Austria. |
| | ca. 1899 | | 0-4-0 | 600 mm (1 ft 11 5/8 in) | 20 hp | Forêt de Meillant |
| 367 | 1899 | | 0-4-0 | 600 mm (1 ft 11 5/8 in) | 20 hp | Delivered via the Swedish general agent Carl Ström to the Hamra–Tumba Järnvägen of Gustaf de Laval on Gotland in Sweden. From 1916 owned by the construction company Byggnads AB, who sold it to the city of Stockholm in 1917 for work on Hammarbyleden. |
| | 1899 | | 0-6-0 FL | | | Fireless locomotive |
| 418 | 1899 | | 0-6-0 | 785 mm (2 ft 6 29/32 in) | | Bröl Valley Railway, BTE 14–17 |
| | 1899 | | 0-6-0 | | | Aktiengesellschaft für Feld- und Kleinbahnen-Bedarf |
| 514 | 1900 | | 0-4-0T | 600 mm (1 ft 11 5/8 in) | 20 hp | Java, Sudhono Sugar Mill N° 5 |
| 531 | 1900 | | 0-4-2 | 600 mm (1 ft 11 5/8 in) | 60 hp | Initially at sugar mill Nakel (Cukrownia Nakło), now Narrow Gauge Railway Museum in Wenecja, Poland |
| 533 | 1899 | | 0-6-2 | 600 mm (1 ft 11 5/8 in) | 60 hp | Kleinbahngesellschaft Krone, für Wirsitzer Kleinbahn '9' |
| 576–578 | 1900 | | 0-4-4-0; Mallet | 750 mm (2 ft 5 1/2 in) | 120 hp | Kalan |
| 591 | 1900 | | 0-4-2 | 600 mm (1 ft 11 5/8 in) | 80 hp | Kirchlengern–Hille railway (Wallückebahn) in Germany |
| 592 | 1900 | | 0–4–0, later 0-4-2 | 600 mm (1 ft 11 5/8 in) | 80 hp | Kirchlengern–Hille railway (Wallückebahn) in Germany |
| 596 | 1900 | | Initially 0–4–0, later 0-6-0 | 1,000 mm (3 ft 3 3/8 in) | 125 hp | Soest No 9 of the Ruhr-Lippe-Eisenbahngesellschaft in Germany. Used on the ‘quarry line’ Hüsten-Müschede and at Neheim-Hüsten station. Decommissioned in 1924, scrapped in 1930 |
| 614 | 1900 | | 0-4-0 | 750 mm (2 ft 5 1/2 in) | 30 hp | Initially Pakis Baru 1, now Statfold Barn Railway |
| 617 | 1900 | | 0-6-2 | 750 mm (2 ft 5 1/2 in) | 100 hp | Two-cylinder locomotive with three coupled axles and one radial axle. Steam bell, outer frame, upper water tanks. Delivered to the Rosenberger Kreisbahn |
| 673 | 1900 | | 0-4-0 | 900 mm (2 ft 11 7/16 in) | 80 hp | Wackerow & Co, branch office Berlin |
| 683 | 1900 | | 0-4-0 | 508 mm (1 ft 8 in) | 10 hp | Dinty, Cosmopolitan Proprietary Mine, Kookynie, Western Australia |
| 683 | 1900 | | 0-4-0 | 508 mm (1 ft 8 in) | 10 hp | Moira Coal Mine, Collie, Western Australia |
| | ca 1900 | | 0-4-0 | | | Transport of rubber in the Dutch East Indies |
| 687 | 1901 | | 0-4-0 | 600 mm (1 ft 11 5/8 in) | 20 hp | Ceper 2, PG Gondang Baru, Klaten, Indonesia |
| 688 | 1901 | | 0-4-0 | 600 mm (1 ft 11 5/8 in) | 20 hp | Delivered to Jonas & Co, Paris |
| 710; 711 | 1900 | | 0-4-2 | 600 mm (1 ft 11 5/8 in) | 30 hp | Cairo, Egypt |
| | | | 0-8-0 | | | |
| 718 | 1901 | | 0-4-0 | 610 mm (2 ft) | 30 hp | Magnet No. 2, Magnet Silver Mining Co, Tasmania, now Wee Georgie Wood Railway |
| 719 | 1901 | | 0-4-0 | 610 mm (2 ft) | 30 hp | Ordered by North Mount Farrell Mining in Tasmania but not operated there, later Cairns Town Council, Edge Hill Tramway, Queensland |
| 722 | 1902 | | 0-4-2 | 600 mm (1 ft 11 5/8 in) | 30 hp | Srage Sugar Mill, Java, Sragi operator's N° 2 |
| 723 | 1900 | | 0-4-0 | 610 mm (2 ft) | 30 hp | Kearsney–Stanger Light Railway in the Colony of Natal (now KwaZulu-Natal in South Africa) |
| 724 | 1900 | | 0-6-0 | 610 mm (2 ft) | 50 hp | Kearsney–Stanger Light Railway in the Colony of Natal (now KwaZulu-Natal in South Africa |
| 725 | 1900 | | 4-2-0 | 600 mm (1 ft 11 5/8 in) | 40 hp | Monte Alegre for the Usina Monte Alegre sugar mill in Piracicaba in São Paulo Brazil |
| 731 | 1902 | | 0-4-2 | 610 mm (2 ft) | 40 hp | East Murchison United Ltd, Lawlers, Western Australia |
| 772 | 1901 | | 0-4-2 | 600 mm (1 ft 11 5/8 in) | 60 hp | Jatiroto J70, Jatiroto, PG Jatiroto, Indonesia |
| 773 | 1901 | | 0-4-2 | 600 mm (1 ft 11 5/8 in) | 60 hp | Ngadirejo 71, PG Ngadirejo, Kediri, Indonesia |
| 777 | 1901 | | 0-4-2 | 600 mm (1 ft 11 5/8 in) | 60 hp | Pajarakan 2 Kelut, PG Pajarakan, Probolinggo, Indonesia |
| | ca 1901 | | 0-4-2 | 700 mm (2 ft 3 9/16 in) | 60 hp | Tender locomotive with open cab, traction pump, suspension, hand bell, melting plug. Built according to Dutch-Indian regulations. Delivered to India. |
| 810 | 1902 | | 0-4-0 | 610 mm (2 ft) | 20 hp | The so-called Stink Express disposed waste and sewage sludge in Jodhpur, Rajasthan, India |
| 819 | 1901 | | 0-4-0 | 825 mm (2 ft 8 1/2 in) | 20 hp | Burdekin, James Boyd, firewood supplier, Charters Towers, Queensland, Australia |
| 851 | 1902 | | 0-4-0 | 600 mm (1 ft 11 5/8 in) | 30 hp | Initially P. Dinndorf, Strasbourg, now agricultural museum in Eschach-Seifertshofen, Germany |
| 882 | Delivered 1901 | | 0-4-4-0; Mallet | 610 mm (2 ft) | 100 hp | Magnet Tramway No. 2, Tasmania. Supplied by Central Mining & Tramway Appliances Proprietary Ltd 1901. |
| 893 | 1901 | | 0-4-2 | 600 mm (1 ft 11 5/8 in) | 60 hp | Merican 4, PG Merican, Kediri, Indonesia |
| 894 | 1901 | | 0-4-2 | 600 mm (1 ft 11 5/8 in) | 60 hp | Merican 6, PG Merican, Kediri, Indonesia |
| 898 | 1901 | | 0-4-2 | 600 mm (1 ft 11 5/8 in) | 60 hp | Rejosari 1 PG Rejosari, Madiun, Indonesia |
| 930 | 1902 | | 0-4-4-0; Mallet | 600 mm (1 ft 11 5/8 in) | 80 hp | No 5 Hamra, Östra Södermanlands Järnväg, Sweden |
| 932-938 | 1902 | | 2-6-0 | 1,000 mm (3 ft 3 3/8 in) | 400 hp | Utrillas & Co, Spain |
| 943 | 1902 | | 0-4-0 | 610 mm (2 ft) | 100 hp | Douglas, Port Douglas Tramway from Mossman to Port Douglas in Queensland, Australia |
| | ca 1902 | | 0-4-0 | | | |
| | ca 1902–1912 | | 0-4-4-0; Mallet | 750 mm (2 ft 5 1/2 in) | | Sigi railway, Tanzania |
| 979–981 | ca 1903 | | 0-6-0 | 1,435 mm (4 ft 8 1/2 in) | | Merzig-Büschfeld railway company, Merzig/Saar, service No. 1-3 |
| 1001 | 1905 | | 0-6-0 | 750 mm (2 ft 5 1/2 in) | 107 hp | Asturias, No. 6, narrow gauge railway Valdepeñas–Puertollano (El trenillo de La Calzá), Spain |
| 1079 | 1903 | | 0-6-0 | 1,000 mm (3 ft 3 3/8 in) | 80 hp | Sold to J.E. Marland for Mercier France (see also N° 1081) |
| 1080 | 1903 | | 0-6-0 | 1,000 mm (3 ft 3 3/8 in) | 80 hp | Sold to Jallut via the Orenstein & Koppel office in Brussels |
| 1081 | 1903 | | 0-6-0 | 1,000 mm (3 ft 3 3/8 in) | 80 hp | Sold to J.E. Marland for Mercier France (see also N° 1079) |
| 1089 | 1903 | | 0-4-4-0; Mallet | 1,000 mm (3 ft 3 3/8 in) | 150 hp | Lenz Type ii, built by Orenstein & Koppel, No 11–16 |
| 1134 | 1903 | | 0-4-0 | 762 mm (2 ft 6 in) | 40 hp | Port Kunda Cement Factory |
| 1193 | 1903 | | 0-4-0 | 600 mm (1 ft 11 5/8 in) | 20 hp | Topham, Jones & Railton, London, who owned also O&K N° 1511/1905 for use at Lyness, Orkney Islands |
| 1162 | 1903 | | 0-4-0 | 750 mm (2 ft 5 1/2 in) | 80 hp | Initially Jacob & Bartisch construction company, Leipzig, later lignite mine Concordia, Nachterstedt, from 1930 lignite mine Gewerkschaft Humboldt, Thüste-Wallensen 8, since 1966 exhibited at the playground Seelze-Letter, since 1994 Emmerthal-Lüntorf, since 1996 narrow gauge museum Rittersgrün, Saxony, Germany |
| 1166 | 1903 | | 0-4-0 | 600 mm (1 ft 11 5/8 in) | 50 hp | Minas de Utrillas |
| 1167 | 1903 | | Bn2t | 600 mm (1 ft 11 5/8 in) | 50 hp | Turba 3, Minas de Utrillas, Spain, since 1983 at the heritage railway Paderborn, since 1985 Guldental 1, Heddesheimer Feldbahn H&G Faust |
| 1211 | 1903 | | 0-6-0 | 1,435 mm (4 ft 8 1/2 in) | 250 or 300 hp | KED Berlin, T3 Han 1858, Han 6197, DRB 89 7458 with Allan straight link valve gear |
| 1339 | 1904 | | 0-4-0 | 600 mm (1 ft 11 5/8 in) | 10 hp | Initially Rigeo–Eretria railway, now railway museum Athens |
| 1358 | 1904 | | 0-4-4-0; Mallet | 600 mm (1 ft 11 5/8 in) | 100 hp | Mallet locomotive with outer cylinders for the Bromberger Kreisbahnen ("von Eisenhardt") |
| 1403 | 1905 | | 0-6-0 | 2 ft (610 mm) | 40 hp | Hacienda Tenextepango, Morelos, Mexico, 24-inch 0-6-0's O&K works Nos. 1403/1905 and 1404/1905 (delivered via Arthur Koppel) and 2128/1906 (via Hermann Sommer). The mill was dynamited in 1913 during the Mexican revolution |
| 1404 | 1905 | | 0-6-0 | 2 ft (610 mm) | 40 hp | Hacienda Tenextepango, Morelos, Mexico, 24-inch 0-6-0's O&K works Nos. 1403/1905 and 1404/1905 (delivered via Arthur Koppel) and 2128/1906 (via Hermann Sommer). The mill was dynamited in 1913 during the Mexican revolution |
| 1411 | 1904 | | 0-4-0 | 22 inch (560 mm) | 20 hp | Northern Colliery Company, Waro Limestone Scenic Reserve, New Zealand. Sold on to New Zealand Cement Co. on Limestone Island in the 1910s and from there to Wilson's Portland Cement Co. in Portland in 1918, where it was operated as Bertha, now the Museum of Transport and Technology in Auckland. |
| 1422 | 1905 | | 0-6-0 | 700 mm (2 ft 3 9/16 in) | 30 HP | Duke Schwarzenberg's Graphite Works Černá v Pošumaví (Schwarzbach) Jihočeský kraj (South Bohemian Region), wood fired |
| 1430 etc | 1904–1912 | | 0-8-0 | 785 mm (2 ft 6 29/32 in) | 200 hp | No 11–20, (since 1910 Kattowitz 113–122), No 23 and 24, Kattowitz 125–126) and Kattowitz 127–130, seven were renumbered to 99 401–406 and 407–408. |
| 1450 | 1905 | | 0-4-4-0 | | 120 hp | Atlamaxac, built for Mr. Sebastian de Mier's ranch in Atlamaxac, Puebla, Mexico. |
| 1459 | 1905 | | 0-4-0 | 1,067 mm (3 ft 6 in) | 125 hp | Domburg of the Utrecht builder J. van Noordenne, who sold it in 1908 to the builder Arntz in Millingen. Unusual track gauge of 1,067 mm (3 ft 6 in) instead of 900 mm. |
| 1466–1470 and 1540 | 1905 | | 0-4-4-0; Mallet | 1,000 mm (3 ft 3 3/8 in) | 200 hp | Lenz & Co for Imperial Colonial Railways in Togo, service weight 31 tons with the simple looking Orenstein patent valve operating system, which like the Hackworth and Klug types was based on Joy's radial valve gear. |
| 1473 | 1905 | | 0-4-4-0; Mallet | 762 mm (2 ft 6 in) | 60 hp | Initially sugar mill Pakis Baru, now Statfold Barn Railway |
| 1475 | 1905 | | 0-4-0 | 785 mm (2 ft 6 29/32 in) | 200 hp | Königliche Eisenbahndirektion Breslau for KWI Kat 16, later Prussian T 37 Nr. 118, used in May 1916 on the Poix-Terron–Châtillon railway |
| | | | 0-4-0 | | | Light Railway Plant supplied for the New Crown Hill Reservoir Works by C. A. Zadig & Co., Queen Victoria Street, London, E.C. A commemorative plaque at the B&Q Carpark in Crownhill Retail Park in Plymouth reads: ""In the early 20 century a reservoir was built here. Its construction was a huge undertaking. Gangs of men and steam-powered engines were used to excavate the reservoir. The soil was loaded onto trucks on a narrow gauge railway specially built to take away the excavated soil." |
| 1479 | 1905 | | 0-4-0 | 600 mm (1 ft 11 5/8 in) | 20 hp | Sydney (Alte Normalien, old standard) was used by Orson Wright & Co between 1907 and 1911 in the construction of the Ambergate Reservoir. The locomotive passed to H. Arnold & Son on 10 May 1912. |
| 1480 | 1905 | | 0-4-0 | 600 mm (1 ft 11 5/8 in) | 20 hp | Beaumont Leys. The Name is recorded in the original O&K records. Older reports of Sydney being N° 1480 were an error caused by confusion of the two locos. The extended buffer beams and the curved pipe to the whistle identify this as N° 1480, and the worksplate can just be read on better versions. |
| 1498 | 1904 | | 0-6-0 | 1,000 mm (3 ft 3 3/8 in) | 50 hp | Rajahgopal, Cochin State Forest Tramway |
| 1539^{?} | 1906 | | 0-4-4-0; Mallet | 600 mm (1 ft 11 5/8 in) | 80 hp | Toul No. 1, Public works company Estrade-Taher, France |
| 1567 | 1905 | | 2-4-0 | 891 mm (2 ft 11 3/32 in) (Swedish 3 ft gauge) | | Borgholm, initially Borgholm-Böda Järnväg (BBJ) No 1, later Ölands Järnvägar Nr. 7 |
| 1568 | 1905 | | 2-4-0 | 891 mm (2 ft 11 3/32 in) (Swedish 3 ft gauge) | | Initially Borgholm-Böda Järnväg (BBJ) No 2, later Ölands Järnvägar No 8 |
| 1602 | 1905 | | 0-4-0 | 600 mm (1 ft 11 5/8 in) | 30 hp | Grytgöl, No. 4, Ljusfallshammar, Sweden |
| 1611 | 1906 | | 0-4-0 | 891 mm (2 ft 11 3/32 in) (Swedish 3 ft gauge) | | Göta sulfitfabrik (Västergötland) |
| 1627 | 1905 | | 0-4-0 | 600 mm (1 ft 11 5/8 in) | 40 hp | Bertha, No. 12, Chemin de fer des Chanteraines |
| 1651 | 1905 | | 0-4-0 | 750 mm (2 ft 5 1/2 in) | 20 hp | Hanko & Co, Argentina, later Dodero, Argentina, now Thomaz Laranjeira Square at Porto Murtinho, Brazil. |
| 1685 | 1905 | | 0-4-0 | 762 mm (2 ft 6 in) | | Thomas Duff & Co. Kalkutta (occasionally listed as fireless). |
| 1694 | 1920 | | 0-4-0 | 610 mm (2 ft) | 125 hp | Gas Light and Coke Co (G. L. C. C.), Kensal Green |
| 1696 | 1906 | | 0-4-0 | 600 mm (1 ft 11 5/8 in) | 20 hp | Forest railway locomotive on the grass verge of Avenida Mitre between Avenida López Torres and Calle 25 de Mayo in Posadas, Argentina. The cow-catcher is probably based on the imagination of the erectors. The driver's cab also seems to be a simplified replica. |
| 1767 | 1905 | | 0-6-0 | 610 mm (2 ft) | 150 hp | Matheran Hill Railway |
| 1775 | 1906 | | 0-4-2 | 610 mm (2 ft) | 50 hp | No. 1 South-Western Railway Company, Knysna, South Africa |
| 1779 | 1906 | | 0-4-2 | 600 mm (1 ft 11 5/8 in) | 40 hp | Stock, Cairo, later South-Western Railway, Knysna, South Africa |
| 1786 | 1905 | | 0-4-4-0; Mallet | 600 mm (1 ft 11 5/8 in) | 80 hp | Pesantren 150, PG Pesantren Baru, Kediri, Indonesia |
| 1787 | 1905 | | 0-4-4-0; Mallet | 600 mm (1 ft 11 5/8 in) | 80 hp | Pesantren 151, PG Pesantren Baru, Kediri, Indonesia |
| 1788 | 1905 | | 0-4-0 | 600 mm (1 ft 11 5/8 in) | 20 hp | Pacific Phosphate & Co, Sydney, used on the phosphate railway Nauru |
| 1847 | 1906 | | 4-4-0 | 891 mm (2 ft 11 3/32 in) (Swedish 3 ft gauge) | 150 hp | Der Kaiser, initially Borgholm–Böda Järnväg BBJ No 3, later Ölands Järnväg ÖJ No 9, since 1947 SJ w3p 3059, scrapped in 1953 |
| 1870–1875, 2069–2070, 2356–2361, 2731–2734, 3182–3184, 4198–4199 | 1906–1910 | | 0–8–0; 1'Dnv2t (No. 1-6); 1'Dn2t (others) | 1,067 mm (3 ft 6 in) | 300 hp | Lüderitz Bay Railway and South African Railways |
| 1878 | 1906 | | 0-6-0 | 600 mm (1 ft 11 5/8 in) | 60 hp | Built for Caminho de Ferro Mossamedes, Angola |
| 1935 | 1906 | | 0-6-0T | about 711 mm (2 ft 4 in) | 140 hp or 160 hp | Ordered and possibly designed by Freudenstein for the Ricken Tunnel construction in Switzerland. Freudenstein had ceased building locomotives in 1905. According to O&K records, it was 140 HP (not 160 as in the catalogue), and it carried the name Wattwil |
| 2029 | 1906 | | 0-4-0T | about 711 mm (2 ft 4 in) | 20 hp | LVD1, Parada Sud Quarry near Pueblo Centenario. Hanko & Co, Argentina, preserved by Círculo de Estudios Ferroviarios del Uruguay (CEFU) at the Railway Museum in Montevideo Central Station, Uruguay, ex Lucas José Obes |
| 2033 | 1906 | | 0-4-0 | about 630 mm (24 13/16 in) | 20 hp | H.P.Taylor & Co, New Zealand, Northern Coal Comp, exhibited at playground in Tauranga, New Zealand, preserved at MOTAT, Auckland, New Zealand |
| 2053 | 1906 | | 0-4-0 | 600 mm (1 ft 11 5/8 in) | 40 hp | Frankfurter Feldbahnmuseum No. 4 |
| 2076 | 1906 | | 0-4-0 | 600 mm (1 ft 11 5/8 in) | 40 hp | Used by ASEA for the construction of the Lidingöbanan |
| 2098 | 1906 | | 0-4-4-0; Mallet | 600 mm (1 ft 11 5/8 in) | 30 hp | Wonolangan 7, PG Wonolangan, Probolinggo, Indonesia |
| 2128 | 1906 | | 0-6-0 | 2 ft (610 mm) | 40 hp | Hacienda Tenextepango, Morelos, Mexico, 24-inch 0-6-0's O&K works Nos. 1403/1905 and 1403/1905 (delivered via Arthur Koppel) and 2128/1906 (via Hermann Sommer). The mill was dynamited in 1913 during the Mexican revolution |
| 2129 | 1906 | | 0-6-0 | 750 mm (2 ft 5 1/2 in) | 135 hpi | Prignitzer Kreiskleinbahnen No. 22, 99 4504; scrapped in 1966 |
| 2220 | 1907 | | 0-4-2 | 1,067 mm (3 ft 6 in) | 30 hp | Khartum–Wadi Halfa railway |
| 2240 | 1907 | | 0-6-0 | 610 mm (2 ft) | 100 hp | No. 2 South-Western Railway Company, Knysna, South Africa |
| 2250 | 1907 | | 0-2-0 | 2 ft (610 mm) | 40 hp | London via Arthur Koppel |
| 2271 | 1907 | | 0-4-0 | 610 mm (2 ft) | 30 hp | Initially Public Works Department of Victoria, land reclamation work at the Coode Canal, Port Melbourne, later Western Australian Public Works Department, Point Samson–Roebourne |
| 2303 | 1907 | | 0-4-0 | 610 mm (2 ft) | 30 hp | Harvey, Western Australia (see also No 2271/1997) |
| 2342 | 1907 | | 0-6-0 | 610 mm (2 ft) | 150 hp | 739 Matheran, Matheran Hill Railway, now National Rail Museum of India, New Delhi. |
| 2343 | 1907 | | 0-6-0 | 610 mm (2 ft) | 150 hp | 740 Matheran, Matheran Hill Railway, now Leighton Buzzard Light Railway |
| 2351 | 1907 | | 0-4-0 | about 655 mm (2 ft 1 25/32 in) | 60 hp | Cia Carbones Asturianos, Nalón, Asturias, Spain |
| 2378 | 1907 | | 0-4-0 | 600 mm (1 ft 11 5/8 in) | 30 hp | Utrillas, Lancashire Mining Museum (West Lancashire Light Railway until 2021) |
| 2424 | 1907 | | 0-4-0 | 600 mm (1 ft 11 5/8 in) | 20 hp | Similar to 2461/1907. Whim Creek Copper Mine near City of Karratha, Western Australia. |
| | 1907 | | 0-8-0 | | | Naters, Switzerland |
| 2346 | 1907 | | 0-6-0 | 600 mm (1 ft 11 5/8 in) | 20 hp | Hacienda San Nicolás del Monte Chaparro, Michoacán, Mexico |
| 2413–2416 | 1907 | | 0-8-0 | | | Loetschberg No.42, Switzerland |
| 2448 | 1908 | | 0-4-0 | 750 mm (2 ft 5 1/2 in) | 40 hp | Delivered to Lötschbergbahn as a construction locomotive, later probably Simplon No. 4, used at Brig during the construction of the Simplon Tunnel |
| 2475 | 1907 | | 0-4-0 | 600 mm (1 ft 11 5/8 in) | 30 hp | Fia, No. 1, Aspa Bruk (Ägare Munksjö AB), Sweden |
| 2502 | 1907 | | | 1,435 mm (4 ft 8 1/2 in) | 250 hp | Arthur Koppel rack railway at the Ougrée-Marihaye Company plant in Belgium |
| 2510 | 1907 | | 0-4-0T | 600 mm (1 ft 11 5/8 in) | 40 hp | Coal fired, delivered to J.L.Hulett & Sons Ltd, Cairo, Luipaardsvlei Estate & Gold Mines, South Africa No 4 610 mm, preserved at Sandstone Heritage Trust, Hoekfontein, Free State, South Africa ex Halfway House ex Krugersdorp Safari Park |
| 2525 | 1908 | | 0-4-0 | 891 mm (2 ft 11 3/32 in) (Swedish 3 ft gauge) | 140 hp | Skånska Järnvägar |
| 2528–2530 or 9738–9739 | | | 0-4-0 | 900 mm (2 ft 11 7/16 in) | 140 hp | N° 17 of the Kindl company during the Elbe regulation 1926–1930, section Kovanice–Poděbrady in the Czech Republic |
| 2531 | 1907 | | 0-8-0 | 600 mm (1 ft 11 5/8 in) | 65 hp | Brigadelok, HFB N° 225 |
| 2532 | 1907 | | 0-8-0 | 600 mm (1 ft 11 5/8 in) | 65 hp | Brigadelok, HFB N° 226, group photo, 1908. In memory of E. 3. Comp. R. II, summer retreat Klausdorf |
| 2534 | 1907 | | 0-9-0 | 600 mm (1 ft 11 5/8 in) | 65 hp | HFB N° 228, We drove the iron horse on iron tracks, but now we are heading home at full steam ('Wir fuhren das Dampfross auf eisernen Wegen, doch jetzt geht es mit Volldampf der Heimat entgegen') |
| 2535 | 1907 | | 0-6-0 | 600 mm (1 ft 11 5/8 in) | 65 hp | Versuchsabteilung der Verkehrstruppen (Research Department of the Railway Troops) Berlin, Klien-Lindner axles, HFB N° 229 |
| 2595 | 1907 | | 0-6-0 | 1,435 mm (4 ft 8 1/2 in) | 300 hp | Ferrovia Valle Brembana |
| 2604 | 1907 | | 0-6-0 | 1,000 mm (3 ft 3 3/8 in) | 150 hp | Cochin State Forest Tramway |
| 2609 | 1907 | | 0-4-4-0; Mallet | 610 mm (2 ft) | 110 hp | Orenstein & Koppel Ltd, London-Berlin, General-Agents, The ‚Central' Mining & Tramway Appliances Proprietary Ltd 40, Hunter Street, Sydney Magnet Tramway, now Bennett Brook Railway |
| 2609 | 1907 | | 0-4-4-0; Mallet | 610 mm (2 ft) | 110 hp | Magnet Tramway No. 3, Tasmania. Supplied by Central Mining & Tramway Appliances Proprietary Ltd between 1903 and 1905. Front (low pressure) cylinders 12 inches × 12 inches; rear (high pressure) cylinders 8 inches × 12 inches; wheel diameter 2 feet 1 inch; rigid wheelbase 4 feet 3 inches; total wheelbase 10 feet; boiler pressure 170 lb per square inch; weight in service 18 tons. |
| 2621 | 1908 | | 0-6-0 | 600 mm (1 ft 11 5/8 in) | 20 hp | British Phosphate Commissioners, Australia, probably for Ocean Island Railway, Replacement boiler N° 10664 |
| 2641 | 1907 | | 0-4-0 | 750 mm (2 ft 5 1/2 in) | | Union Bergb. Wien (1907–), Rheinregulierungsbahn Steffi (1937–), now Technisches Museum, TMW-Depot Marchegg |
| 2649 | 1908 | | 0-4-0 | 600 mm (1 ft 11 5/8 in) | 40 hp | Tacot des Lacs |
| 2667 | 1907 | | 0-4-2 | 700 mm (2 ft 3 9/16 in) | 40 hp | Djatirota sugar mill, Surabaya, Java, Indonesia |
| | ca 1908 | | 0-4-0 | 600 mm (1 ft 11 5/8 in) | | Taube (pigeon), the US army confiscated the German locomotive in World War I near Cierges in France |
| | ca 1908 | | 0-4-0 | 600 mm (1 ft 11 5/8 in) | | Unsere Kleine (our small one), German locomotive in World War I, presumably on the western front |
| 2672 | 1908 | | 0-6-0 | 1,000 mm (3 ft 3 3/8 in) | 125 hp | Coal fired, Bachstein-Koppel Consortium for Ferrocarril Santa Catarina, Brazil, for Blumenau-Harmonia (now Blumenau-Ibirama), preserved at Blumenau, Brazil |
| 2677 | 1907 | | 0-8-0 | 750 mm (2 ft 5 1/2 in) | 200 hp | Loetschberg N° 32, compressed air locomotive |
| 2681 | 1907 | | 0-4-0 | 1,000 mm (3 ft 3 3/8 in) | 20 hp | Bauru, São Paulo, Brazil |
| 2697 | 1908 | | 0-4-0 | 600 mm (1 ft 11 5/8 in) | 40 hp | Moortje, Efteling Stoomtrein Maatschappij, near Kaatsheuvel between Waalwijk and Tilburg, Netherlands |
| 2701 | 1908 | | 2-8-0 | 1,000 mm (3 ft 3 3/8 in) | 300 hp | Usambara Railway, EbN° 11 |
| 2728 | 1908 | | 0-4-4-0; Mallet | 600 mm (1 ft 11 5/8 in) | 60 hp | Rejo Agung 23 Ponen^{II}, PG Rejo Agung, Madiun, Indonesia (See also: N° 4494/1910) |
| 2738 | 1908 | | 0-6-0 | 1,435 mm (4 ft 8 1/2 in) | 350 hp | Valsugana, Italy, Ferrovie Valsugana N° 4, since 1912 FS 87 161 |
| 2748 | 1908 | | 0-4-0 | 610 mm (2 ft) | | Dunkley Brothers, North East Dundas Tramway |
| 2762 | 1907 | | 0-8-0 | 600 mm (1 ft 11 5/8 in) | 35 hp | PG Tulungagung 1, Mojopanggung, Java, Indonesia |
| 2797 | 1908 | | 0-4-4-0; Mallet | 600 mm (1 ft 11 5/8 in) | 80 hp | Initially Compania Minera de Torreon, Mexico, later Cia. Minera de Penoles-Avalos, Mexico, since 1964 No. 1, Cripple Creek and Victor Narrow Gauge Railroad, Colorado, USA |
| 2900 | 1908 | | 0-4-0 | 1,000 mm (3 ft 3 3/8 in) | 20 hp | Tramway locomotive, Arthur Koppel for Russia, possibly for Odesa, 7.7 t operating weight, oil fired |
| 2903 and 2904 | 1908 | | 0-4-0 | 600 mm (1 ft 11 5/8 in) | 30 hp | SA & Ind Forestali, Bibbiena, Italy |
| 2922 | 1908 | | 0-8-0 | 750 mm (2 ft 5 1/2 in) | 30 hp | Steam sawmill Dampfsägewerk Sokoliki GmbH, Sokoliki near Tarnawini, Galizia, KLA (Klien-Lindner hollow axles) |
| 2956 | 1908 | | 0-4-0 | 1,435 mm (4 ft 8 1/2 in) | 170 hp | Sugar factory Samter (now Szamotuły) in Poland, uncertain whether it is still here |
| 2959 | 1908 | | 2–4–0 initially 1’B n2t later 1’B h2t | 1,435 mm (4 ft 8 1/2 in) | 300 hp | Ruppiner Kreisbahn AG, Neuruppin, operating N° 14, DR 70 6176 |
| 2966 | 1908 | | 0-4-2 | 600 mm (1 ft 11 5/8 in) | 40 hp | De Maas 4, PG De Maas, Besuki, Indonesia |
| 2967 | 1908 | | 0-4-2 | 600 mm (1 ft 11 5/8 in) | | Lumajang, PG Jatiroto, Indonesia |
| 3000 | 1908 | | 0-4-4-0 (Mallet) | 1,000 mm (3 ft 3 3/8 in) | 150 hp | Via Lenz & Co to Greifenberg narrow gauge railway in the Gryfice district in Western Pomerania, Poland |
| 3009 | 1908 | | 0-6-0 | 600 mm (1 ft 11 5/8 in) | 140 hpi | KKP No 1, Kleinbahn Klockow–Pasewalk, since 1950 DR 99 4612 |
| 3010 | 1908 | | 0-6-0 | 600 mm (1 ft 11 5/8 in) | 140 hpi | KKP No 2, Kleinbahn Klockow–Pasewalk, since 1950 DR 99 99 4613 |
| 3019 | 1909 | | 0-4-0 | 900 mm (2 ft 11 7/16 in) | 140 hp | Initially Hollandse Anneming Maatschappij, later harbour locomotive of SA Railways in Paardeneiland, Cape Town |
| 3053 | 1908 | | 0-4-0 | 600 mm (1 ft 11 5/8 in) | Steam; 50 hp | Aquilla, initially Wuytack de Gand, Belgium, later S. A. de Beton Belges, then Rail Rebecq Rognon. Currently in operation at Pairi Daiza |
| 3069 | 1908 | | 0-6-0 | 1,435 mm (4 ft 8 1/2 in) | 300 hp | Tender locomotive Ed 3/3 used at Brown, Boveri & Cie, built in 1908 by Orenstein & Koppel in Berlin, loaned to the Seetal railway line as N° 51 until 1910, then sold to Brussels in 1914. |
| 3111–3112 | 1909 | | 0-6-0 | 1,435 mm (4 ft 8 1/2 in) | 350 hp | Becker & Co for secondary railway Friedeberg-Flinsberg |
| 3127 | 1908 | | 0-6-0 | 1,000 mm (3 ft 3 3/8 in) | 125 hp | Gerald & Lorna Dee Collection, Museums Victoria |
| 3136 | 1908 | | 0-4-0 | 600 mm (1 ft 11 5/8 in) or 610 mm (2 ft) | 40 hp | Amberley Museum Railway |
| 3161–3163 | 1908 | | 0-4-0 | 600 mm (1 ft 11 5/8 in) | 40 hp | Island of Angaur in German New Guinea, from 1918 Nanyo-Agency (南洋庁) in the Japanese South Seas Mandate. The following 600 mm (1 ft 11 5/8 in) gauge O&K locomotives were supplied to Deutsche Südseephosphat AG, Angaur: Nos 3161, 3162 & 3163 in 1908, No 4236 in 1910 and No 4783 in 1911. |
| | | | 0-6-0 | | | In Japan with a snow plow |
| 3174 | 1908 | | 0-6-0 | 600 mm (1 ft 11 5/8 in) | 150 hp | Ortal Group K6, Tramways du Lot-et-Garonne, Tonneins, France |
| 3216 | 1908 | | 0-4-0 | 900 mm | 90 hp | J.A. Reif & Kröll of Koblenz, Germany. 1922 Hatt-Haller & Züblin in Zurich, used as No. 1 on the construction site of the Wägitalersee dam. In 1931 it went to the gravel pit at Hardwald in Dietikon. 1939 privat owner Bertrams, 1972 Oswald Steam OSS, Samstagern. Until 1992 private owner J.H. Heuser in Zurich. Conversion to 1000 mm at SLM, since 28.11.2000 stored at the local model railway club in Einsiedeln. In the 2000s memorial at the gravel pit in Hardwald in Dietikon. Nameplate still with the addition Formerly Lokomotivfabrik Berlin-Drewitz (Bhf.) |
| 3247 | 1909 | | 0-6-0 | 600 mm (1 ft 11 5/8 in) | 20 hp | Hacienda San Nicolás del Monte Chaparro, Michoacán, Mexico |
| 3248 | 1909 | | 0-4-0 | 600 mm (1 ft 11 5/8 in) | | Railway from Embleton Quarry to Christon Bank station and to the small harbour at Craster, Northumberland, Fanny Gray (O&K 3248/1909) in front of Dunstanburgh (Jung 812/1904) |
| 3350 | 1909 | | 0-8-0 | 750 mm (2 ft 5 1/2 in) | 120 hp | Shipped to Kiev, Klien-Lindner axles |
| 3377 | 1908 | | 0-8-0 | 750 mm (2 ft 5 1/2 in) | | Glückauf, Trusebahn, later DR 994531 |
| 3430^{?} | 1908 | | 0-8-0 | 785 mm (2 ft 6 29/32 in) | 200 hp | Kattowitz II. The Urskog–Hølandsbanen from Sørumsand to Skulerud in Norway (750 mm (2 ft 5 1/2 in) gauge) got an offer for an O&K locomotive like the one, but never bought it. |
| 3310 | 1909 | | 0-6-0 | 610 mm (2 ft) | 60 hp | German Annie, No. 4, Proserpine Central Mill Co Ltd, Queensland, Australia |
| 3311 | 1909 | | C'1 n2t | 610 mm (2 ft) | 120 hp | Kaiser, Gin Gin Central Mill Co Ltd, Wallaville, Queensland, Australia |
| 3317 | 1909 | | 0-4-2 | 610 mm (2 ft) | 40 hp | Jatiroto 23J, Lumajang, PG Jatiroto, Indonesia |
| 3324 | 1909 | | 0-4-4-0 | 700 mm (2 ft 3 9/16 in) | 80 hp | Sugar mill Ketanen, Modjokerto, East Java, Dutch East Indies (now Indonesia) |
| 3325 | 1909 | | 0-4-4-0 | 700 mm (2 ft 3 9/16 in) | 80 hp | Sugar mill Ketanen, Modjokerto, East Java, Dutch East Indies (now Indonesia) |
| 3354 | 1909 | | 0-6-0T+T | 600 mm (1 ft 11 5/8 in) | 40 hp | Tetyukhe-Pristan railway (near Dalnegorsk) in Olga county of Primorsky region (also known as: Tihoteho Mining Corp Ltd, Brynew, Sibiria) |
| 3358 | 1909 | | 0-3-0 | Monorail locomotive (Ewing System) | 20 hp | Patiala State Monorail Tramways, now National Rail Museum of India, New Delhi. The locomotive's three wheels run with double wheel flanges on a steel rail laid along a road and transfer about 95% of the weight. A support wheel prevents the locomotive from tipping over. |
| 3362 | 1909 | | 0-4-0T | 900 mm or 891 mm | 140 hp | H. Weber, Unnam, construction of the Osterfeld-Hamm railway delivered to Datteln Skanska Cement AB Schweden, later Limhama, preserved as Cementa, N° 16 at Hesselby Jernvägar, Gotland, Sweden |
| 3375 | 1909 | | 0-4-0 | 900 mm | 60 hp | J.A. Reif & Kröll of Koblenz, Germany. 1922 Hatt-Haller & Züblin in Zurich, used as No. 2 on the construction site of the Wägitalersee dam. |
| | ca 1909 | | 0-4-4-0 | | | |
| 3444 | 1909 | | 0-4-0FL; Fireless | 1,435 mm (4 ft 8 1/2 in) | 160 hp | Braunkohlen & Brikettindustrie AG Millygrube, Mückenberg, Lower Lusatia |
| 3452 | 1910 | | 0-4-4-0; Mallet | 700 mm (2 ft 3 9/16 in) | 80 hp | Compagnie de l'Union in Mazaugues, France |
| 3475 | 1909 | | 0-4-0T FL | 500 mm (19 3/4 in) | 30 hp | S.A. minière et industrielle Domsgrube near Jaworzno, fireless locomotive similar to 4464/1910, 4465/1910 and 5150/1911 |
| 3484 | 1909 | | 0-4-0 | 600 mm (1 ft 11 5/8 in) | 50 hp | Entreprise Léon Martin, Montmedy (Meuse), who owned also O&K N° 3245/1909 with 30 hp |
| 3488 | 1909 | | 0-4-0T+T | 600 mm (1 ft 11 5/8 in) | 30 hp | Delivered to Genietroepen, Utrecht for Kamp van Zeist, Netherlands |
| 3493 | 1909 | | 2-4-0T+T | 750 mm (2 ft 5 1/2 in) | 50 hp | The Borneo Co. Ltd. in Lampang in Siam |
| 3498 | 1909 | | 0-4-0 | 600 mm (1 ft 11 5/8 in) | 20 hp | Anita No. 6, Mines at Dícido, Mioño, Spain |
| 3507 | 1909 | | 0-6-0 | 900 mm (2 ft 11 7/16 in) | 140 hp | Steven Arntz, Herne, North Rhine-Westphalia |
| 3508 | 1909 | | 0-6-0 | 900 mm (2 ft 11 7/16 in) | 140 hp | Steven Arntz, Herne, North Rhine-Westphalia |
| 3509 | 1909 | | 0-6-0 | 900 mm (2 ft 11 7/16 in) | 140 hp | Steven Arntz, Herne, North Rhine-Westphalia |
| 3510 | 1909 | | 0-6-0 | 900 mm (2 ft 11 7/16 in) | 140 hp | Steven Arntz, Herne, North Rhine-Westphalia |
| 3524 | 1909 | | 0-8-0 | 750 mm (2 ft 5 1/2 in) | 125 hp | Bakhilovo branch of Count A.A. Orlov-Davydov (А.А. Орлова-Давыдова)), Russia, Klien-Lindner axles |
| 3558 | 1909 | | 0-4-0 | 508 mm (1 ft 8 in) | 30 hp | Kimberley, The Basset Mines Ltd, Illogan, England |
| 3589 | 1909 | | 0-6-0T+T | 600 mm (1 ft 11 5/8 in) | 30 hp | Económico Correntino Nº658 (or Nº651) |
| 3598 | 1909 | | 0-6-0 | 600 mm (1 ft 11 5/8 in) | 30 hp | Sugar factory of Earl Theobald Czernin, Dymokur in Bohemia (now Czech Republic) |
| 3628-3630 | 1909 | | 0-6-0 | 600 mm (1 ft 11 5/8 in) | 125 hp | Tramways de Nice, Klien-Lindner axles. Due to late delivery of the electric trams, three O&K steam locos (N° 3628–3630) were put to work |
| 3724 | 1910 | | 0-4-0 | | 20 hp | Bei Drabo in Östergötland, Sweden |
| 3741 | 1909 | | 0-4-0 | 600 mm (1 ft 11 5/8 in) | 20 hp | Ferrocarril de la República de los Niños, Argentina |
| 3753 | 1909 | | 0-8-0 | 600 mm (1 ft 11 5/8 in) | 60 hp | Pagottan 1, PG Pagottan, Madiun, Indonesia |
| 3771 | 1909 | | 0-6-0 | 610 mm (2 ft) | 50 hp | Goodwood Tramway, Kalgoorlie and Boulder Firewood Co, Beria, Western Australia |
| 3892 | 1910 | | | | | Replacement boiler for K. Pautzmann brick works, Gundorf near Leipzig |
| 3789 | 1910 | | 0-8-0 | 600 mm (1 ft 11 5/8 in) | 100 hp | Kanigoro Nr. 5, PG Kanigoro, Madiun, Indonesia |
| 3902 | 1909 | | 0-4-4-0 Mallet | 600 mm (1 ft 11 5/8 in) | 30 hp | Frankfurter Feldbahnmuseum No 13 |
| 3904 | | | 2-4-0 | 762 mm (2 ft 6 in) or 914 mm (3 ft) | 200 hp | From Orenstein-Arthur Koppel Company, 30 Church St., New York via Schwab & Tillmann, agent for Cuba, San Ignacio 76, Habana to Central dos Amigos, |
| 3937 | 1909 | | 0-4-0 | 500 mm (19 3/4 in) | | Museo Franco Rossi, San Giovanni in Persiceto (BO), Italy |
| | In or after 1909 | | 0-4-0 | 600 mm (1 ft 11 5/8 in) | | Sugar factory in Dutch East Indies, with four head lamps |
| 3939 | 1910 | | 0-6-6-0; Mallet | 1,000 mm (3 ft 3 3/8 in) | 500 hp | 55 t, NWE N° 31 of Nordhausen-Wernigeroder Eisenbahn-Gesellschaft for Brocken Railway |
| 3940 | 1910 | | 0-6-6-0; Mallet | 1,000 mm (3 ft 3 3/8 in) | 500 hp | 55 t, NWE N° 32 Nordhausen-Wernigeroder Eisenbahn-Gesellschaft for Brocken Railway |
| 3973 | 1910 | | 2-6-0 | 1,000 mm (3 ft 3 3/8 in) | 350 hp | Tacna–Arica railway, Direccion de Obras Publicas, Santiago N° 23, service weight 69 tons with tender |
| 3980 | 1910 | | 0-8-0 | 760 mm (2 ft 5 15/16 in) | 80 hp | Initially Toth Mihaly, Budapest, later 764.211, then 6110 Rachita Museum Satului, Bucharest, since 2004 Măriuța, Mocăniță pe traseul CFF Vișeu, Romania |
| 3952 | 1910 | | 0-8-0 | 600 mm (1 ft 11 5/8 in) | 100 hp | Purwodadi 8, PG Purwodadi, Ngawi, Indonesia |
| 3961 | 1910 | | 0-8-0 | 610 mm (2 ft) | 50 hp | Goodwood Timber and Tramway Co Ltd, Port Albert, Victoria, Australia |
| 3999 | 1910 | | 0-6-0 | 1,000 mm (3 ft 3 3/8 in) | 175 hp | Ortal Group K4, Tramways du Lot-et-Garonne, Tonneins, France |
| 4000 | 1910 | | 2-6-0T | 1,435 mm (4 ft 8 1/2 in) | 350 hp | Mecklenburg T 4, Grand Duchy of Mecklenburg Friedrich-Franz Railway, Schwerin, operative number 714, DRB 91 1914 |
| 4011 | 1910 | | 0-6-0 | 600 mm (1 ft 11 5/8 in) | 20 hp | Ferrocarril Austral Fueguino, El Tren del Fin del Mundo, now plinted at the jail of Ushuaia |
| 4017 | 1910 | | 0-4-0 | Initially 600 mm (1 ft 11 5/8 in), later 1,000 mm (3 ft 3 3/8 in) | 20 hp | FC Midland de Buenos Aires and Talleres Libertad, later Domingo Faustino Sarmiento Railway X-5, now Plaza Once, Buenos Aires, Argentina |
| 4025 | 1910 | | 0-4-0 | 600 mm (1 ft 11 5/8 in) | 50 hp | Tramway de Chambéry, Département de la Savoie, France |
| 4028 | 1910 | | 0-8-0 | 600 mm (1 ft 11 5/8 in) | 80 hp | Makatea, Tuamotu, French Polynesia |
| 4051–4052 | 1910 | | 0-8-0 | 600 mm (1 ft 11 5/8 in) | 200 hp | Juan Llamedo, Acámbaro, Mexico for Ferrocarril Acámbaro and Querétaro, Klien-Lindner axles, 8 wheel tender |
| 4058 | 1910 | | 0-4-0 | 1,067 mm (3 ft 6 in) | 50 hp | Carnarvon Tramway, Western Australia |
| 4083 | 1910 | | 0-4-0 | 600 mm (1 ft 11 5/8 in) | 40 hp | Münster |
| 4099 | 1910 | | 0-4-0 | 1,000 mm (3 ft 3 3/8 in) | 70 hp | Acieries de France Forges de C.C.N.M. (Compagnie des forges de Châtillon-Commentry et Neuves-Maisons), Isbergues N° 7 |
| 4101 | 1910 | | 0-4-0 | 600 mm (1 ft 11 5/8 in) | 50 hp | Tramway de la Savoie, 0-4-0 locomotive N° 2 |
| 4115 | 1910 | | 0-8-0T | 750 mm (2 ft 5 1/2 in) | 40 hp | Lovcen, BAr/Virpazar, Montenegro, now on display at Podgorica station |
| 4134 | 1910 | | 0-4-0+t | 750 mm (2 ft 5 1/2 in) | 70 hp | Cornellá, No 14, Narrow gauge railway Palamós–Girona–Banyoles and later narrow gauge railway Valdepeñas–Puertollano |
| 4135 | 1910 | | 0-4-0+t | 750 mm (2 ft 5 1/2 in) | 70 hp | Mercedes, No 15, Narrow gauge railway Palamós–Girona–Banyoles and later narrow gauge railway Valdepeñas–Puertollano |
| 4183 | 1910 | | 0-4-0 fireless | 1,000 mm (3 ft 3 3/8 in) | | Howrah Mills Co. in India |
| 4201 | 1910 | | 2-6-0 | 2 ft (610 mm) | 125 hp | Ingenio Tilapa No.1, Aldama Sugar Mill, Puebla, Mexico |
| 4202 | 1910 | | 2-6-0 | 2 ft (610 mm) | | Ingenio Tilapa No.2, Aldama Sugar Mill, Puebla, Mexico |
| 4244 | 1910 | | 0-8-0 | 600 mm (1 ft 11 5/8 in) | 60 hp | Pagottan 2, PG Pagottan, Madiun, Indonesia |
| 4264 | 1910 | | 0-8-0 | 600 mm (1 ft 11 5/8 in) | 60 hp | Kanigoro 2, Madiun, Java, Indonesia |
| 4300 | 1910 | | 0-8-0 | 600 mm (1 ft 11 5/8 in) | 60 hp | Olean 7, PG Olean, Situbondo, Indonesia |
| 4339 | 1910 | | Built as 0-4-0T, rebuilt to 0-4-2T | 4 ft (1,219 mm) | 100 hp | Ex Mexican Secretary of Navy and War N°1, sold in 1917 to the National Railways of Mexico, became NdeM N°0-A, later renumbered in 1930 as N° 601, now on the National Mexican Railway Museum, Puebla |
| 4360 | 1910 | | 0-8-0 | 600 mm (1 ft 11 5/8 in) | 60 hp | Olean 2, PG Olean, Situbondo, Indonesia |
| 4400 | 1910 | | 0-8-0 | 600 mm (1 ft 11 5/8 in) | 60PS | Kebonagung 2, PG Kebonagung, Malang, Indonesia |
| 4403 | 1911 | | 0-6-0 | 1,435 mm (4 ft 8 1/2 in) | | Preußische Staatsbahn, Gattung T3, N° 89 6143 |
| 4445 | 1910 | | 0-8-0 | 600 mm (1 ft 11 5/8 in) | 60 hp | Purwodadi 10, PG Purwodadi, Ngawi, Indonesia |
| | 1910 | | 0-6-0 | 1,000 mm (3 ft 3 3/8 in) | | Nr. 59. Initially Ferrocarriles del Estado and a construction company of Santiago del Estero, later Tranway Rural Reconquista |
| | 1910 | | 0-4-0 | | 40 hp | Initially Isnardi Alves & Cia, since 1913 Cia. Matte Laranjeira at Estrada de Ferro Guairá a Porto Mendes, since 1944 N° 4 of Serviço de Navegação da Bacia do Prata (SNBP), operational until 1959 or 1916, now exhibited at Guaíra, Paraná, Brazil |
| | ca 1910 | | 2-6-0 | 1,435 mm (4 ft 8 1/2 in) | | |
| 4614–4621 | 1911 | | 2-8-0 | 1,067 mm (3 ft 6 in) | | Lüderitz Bay Railway and South African Railways |
| 4623 | 1911 | | 0-6-0 | Initially 750 mm (2 ft 5 1/2 in), later 914 mm (3 ft) | 60 hp | First locomotive of the FCCSA, preserved at Estación Wánchaq, Cuzco, Peru |
| 4627 | 1911 | | 0-4-0 | 600 mm (1 ft 11 5/8 in) | 30 hp | R.C. Shaw, San Francisco. Probably used for Eureka Road construction. |
| 4631 | 1911 | | Bn2t | 762 mm (2 ft 6 in) | | Grafton Copper Mining Co in Cangai near Grafton in New South Wales, Australia |
| 4359 | 1910 | | 0-8-0 | 600 mm (1 ft 11 5/8 in) | 60 hp | Purwodadi 16, PG Purwodadi, Ngawi, Indonesia |
| 4494 | 1910 | | 0-4-4-0; Mallet | 600 mm (1 ft 11 5/8 in) | 60 hp | Rejoagung No. 23 Ponen^{II} (see also No 2728/1908) |
| 4676 | 1911 | | 0-4-0 | 1,067 mm (3 ft 6 in) | 30 hp | Mizuma Town, Kurume, Fukuoka, Japan |
| 4698–4700 | 1911 | | 0-4-0 | 762 mm (2 ft 6 in) | 15 hp | Japan |
| 4708 | 1911 | | 0-4-0 | 1,435 mm (4 ft 8 1/2 in) | | Fireless locomotive. Imperial Paper Mills Ltd, Gravesend, England |
| 4720 | 1911 | | 0-4-0 | 750 mm (2 ft 5 1/2 in) | 30 hp | Initially Usines Carrières de Vaujours et Livry-Gargan, later Roche-sur-Foron, Haute Savoie, now Stefanie, Chemin de fer touristique d'Abreschviller, France |
| 4760 | 1911 | | 0-4-0 | 600 mm (1 ft 11 5/8 in) | 40 hp | L.M.Canzat Ing. J.Place de Vieilles Halles, Argentan (Orne) |
| 4768 | 1912 | | 0-8-0 | 1,435 mm (4 ft 8 1/2 in) | 500 hp | Société Ané d'Eronville à Crusnes, France, Gölsdorf axles, secondary railway Bossel-Blankenstein N° 3, since 1926 Marburger Kreisbahn N° 5, since 1933 Grube Anna, Alsdorf |
| 4819 | 1912 | | 0-4-0 | 762 mm (2 ft 6 in) | 140 hp | Delivered to Francisco Brunet Manati. The lettering "Orenstein & Arthur Koppel, Comp. Berlin-Nueva York, Agentes Generales para la usla de Puerto-Rico, Koerber & Co, San Juan" is unusual. O&K delivered only 19 locomotives to Puerto Rico, and the name Koerber does not appear in the delivery lists. Orenstein & Koppel – Arthur Koppel was otherwise used. |
| 4843 | 1911 | | 0-4-0 | 762 mm (2 ft 6 in) | 60 hp | Port Kunda Cement Factory, now preserved at Estonian Railway Museum, Lavassaare, Estonia |
| 4852 | 1911 | | 0-4-0 | 600 mm (1 ft 11 5/8 in) | 50 hp | Initially Wuytack de Grand, Brussels, later No. 6 SA de Beton Belges, since 1977 Pistache Rail Rebecq Rognon |
| 4863 | 1911 | | 0-8-0 | 600 mm (1 ft 11 5/8 in) | 60 hp | Gempolkerep 15, Mojokerto, Indonesia |
| 4868 | 1911 | | 0-8-0 | 600 mm (1 ft 11 5/8 in) | 60 hp | Asembagus 16 Slamet, Asembagus, Situbondo, Indonesia |
| 4788 | 1911 | | 0-4-0 | 762 mm (2 ft 6 in) | 10 hp | Delivered to Otto Reimers & Co, for Tokyo, used from December 1913 to June 1916 on the Anbara railway from Shimizu to Ihara Kanaya, a distance of about 5.5 kilometres (3.4 mi) |
| 4789–4790 | 1911 | | 0-4-0 | 762 mm (2 ft 6 in) | 10 hp | Delivered to Otto Reimers & Co, for Tokyo, used from December 1913 to June 1916 on the Anbara railway from Shimizu to Ihara Kanaya, a distance of about 5.5 kilometres (3.4 mi) |
| 4870 | 1911 | | 0-8-0 | 600 mm (1 ft 11 5/8 in) | 60 hp | Wringinanom 6, PG Wringinanom, Situbondo, Indonesia |
| 4880 | 1911 | | 0-8-0 | 610 mm (2 ft) | | South-Western Railway Company, Knysna, South Africa |
| 4930 | 1911 | | 0-4-0 | 600 mm (1 ft 11 5/8 in) | 30 hp | Initially Wegerif, Amsterdam, later brick works Ijsseloord, Arnhem, Netherlands, since 1968 Aagje, Efteling Stoomtrein Maatschappij, near Kaatsheuvel between Waalwijk and Tilburg, Netherlands |
| 4952-4957 | 1912 | | 0-8-0 | 750 mm | 200 hp | Ак class 1–6, Beloretsk railway (Uralbahn), Klien-Lindner axles |
| 4975 | 1912 | | 0-4-0 | 600 mm (1 ft 11 5/8 in) | | Cabo Ráper lighthouse on the Taitao Peninsula in the Aysén Region of Chile |
| 4987 | 1920 | | 0-6-0 | 1,000 mm (3 ft 3 3/8 in) | 60 hp | Diss & Co, Puerto de Adra, Spain |
| 4990 | 1911 | | 0-8-0 | 600 mm (1 ft 11 5/8 in) | 60 hp | Wonolangan 2, PG Wonolangan, Probolinggo, Indonesia |
| 4991 | 1911 | | 0-4-4-0; Mallet | 600 mm (1 ft 11 5/8 in) | 80 hp | Asembagus 8, Asembagus, Situbondo, Indonesia |
| 5020 | 1911 | | 0-8-0 | 600 mm (1 ft 11 5/8 in) | | Tx2-355, Narrow Gauge Railway Museum in Wenecja, Poland, now Plac Strzelecki, Wrocław |
| 5041–5045 | 1911 | | 0-6-0 | 762 mm (2 ft 6 in) | 50 hp | Otto Reimers & Co for Japan, Yamaguchi Line, N° 5044 (N° 2) is preserved at Kubiki Station in Jōetsu, Niigata, Japan |
| 5044 | 1911 | | 0-6-0 | 762 mm (2 ft 6 in) | 50 hp | Otto Reimers & Co for Japan, Daimuru pvd Seibu Railway, Yamaguchi line. In 1911, Daimaru-gumi imported five locomotives (Nos. 5041–5045) for construction work around the JNR Ohi Works and Shinagawa Statio. After that, No. 5044 was sold to Nagareyama Railway, where it was exchanged with Kubiki Railway No. 4. It was used as No. 2 on the Kubiki Railway, but after the closure of the Kubiki Railway, it was loaned to the Seibu Railway's Yamaguchi Line, and is currently preserved at Kubikino Rail Park, located on the site of the Kubiki Railway's Hyakkenchou depot. |
| | 1911 | | 0-6-0 | | | Japan |
| 5081 | 1911 | | 0-6-2 | 508 mm (1 ft 8 in) | 50 hp | The Sons of Gwalia Ltd, Leonora, Western Australia, Koppel |
| 5102 | 1912 | | 0-4-0 | 914 mm (3 ft) | 140 hp | Poldark Mine bei Wendron, Cornwall |
| 5109-5110 | 1911 | | 0-6-0 | 780 mm (2 ft 6 23/32 in) | 150 hp | Basalt AG, Linz am Rhein |
| 5152 | 1911 | | 0-8-0 | 600 mm (1 ft 11 5/8 in) | 80 hp | Kanigoro 4, PG Kanigoro, Madiun, Indonesia |
| 5168 | 1911 | | 0-6-0T+T | 762 mm (2 ft 6 in) | 110 hp | Central Alianza Arcibo & Camry N° 2, Puerto Rico |
| 5175 | 1912 | | 0-8-0 | 700 mm (2 ft 3 9/16 in) | | Ingenio Ledesma, Argentina |
| 5179 | 1912 | | 0-4-0 | 600 mm (1 ft 11 5/8 in) | 50 hp | Katharina, Moor- und Fehnmuseum Elisabethfehn in Barßel, Germany |
| | ca 1912 | | 0-4-0 | 750 mm (2 ft 5 1/2 in) | 50 hp | |
| 5185 | 1913 | | 0-6-0T+T | 750 mm (2 ft 5 1/2 in) | 40 hp | PKP C6-614 (Narrow gauge railway Biała Podlaska – Konstantynów, Poland), since 1942 DRB 99 2532 with additional tender |
| 5199 | 1911 | | 0-8-0 | 600 mm (1 ft 11 5/8 in) | 60 hp | Rendeng 02, PG Rendeng, Kudus, Indonesia |
| 5200 | 1911 | | 0-4-0 FL | 600 mm (1 ft 11 5/8 in) | 60 hp | Fireless locomotive of the municipal drinking water supply pipeline of Rotterdam, |
| 4843 | 1911 | | 0-4-0 | 762 mm (2 ft 6 in) | 60 hp | № 5, Port Kunda Cement Factor, Pärnu-Valga railway, Estonian Railway Museum, Lavassaare, Estonia |
| 5201–5212 | 1912 | | 2-6-0 | 1,000 mm (3 ft 3 3/8 in) | 350 hp | Chilean Longitudinal Railway N° 21–32 |
| 5217 | 1912 | | 0-8-0 | 600 mm (1 ft 11 5/8 in) | 60 hp | Gempolkerep 14, Mojokerto, Indonesia |
| 5297 | 1912 | | 0-4-0 | 1,067 mm (3 ft 6 in) | 40 hp | Miyazaki Kotsu Railway SL No 1 (1913–1962), now JR Lyushu Nichinan Line |
| 5301–5305 | 1912 | | | | 20 hp | Delivered to Argentina. The main dimensions changed in 1912 from 145 mm × 260 mm cylinders and 900 mm axle distance (Alte Normalien, old standard) to 150 mm × 275 mm cylinders and 1200 mm axle distance (Neue Normalien, new standard) |
| 5335 | 1912 | | 0-6-0 | 750 mm (2 ft 5 1/2 in) | 80 hp | Sri Maharacha Timber Company SRJ, Si Racha, SRJ 6, now Surasak Montri Public Park, Si Racha Thailand |
| 5414 | 1912 | | 0-6-0 | 1,435 mm (4 ft 8 1/2 in) | 350 hp | Municipal Construction Office, Duisburg, since 1924 Marburger Kreisbahn N°4, since 1954 AG Aufbau, Allendorf |
| 5438 | 1912 | | 0-8-0 | 600 mm (1 ft 11 5/8 in) | 60 hp | Merapi 15, Asembagus, Situbondo, Indonesia |
| 5440 | 1912 | | 0-4-0 | 600 mm (1 ft 11 5/8 in) | 60 hp | Olean 4, PG Olean, Situbondo, Indonesia |
| 5441 | 1912 | | 0-4-0 | 610 mm (2 ft) | 15 hp | Otto Reimers, Teikokou Sharyo (914mm), Japan |
| 5343 | 1912 | | D n2 | 2 ft (610 mm) | 100 hp | N° 4 ‘ASPILLAGA’, 100 hp, ordered for Hacienda Cayalti in Cayalti District, Región de Lambayeque, Peru |
| 5449 | 1912 | | 0-8-0 | 600 mm (1 ft 11 5/8 in) | 80 hp | Ferrocarril Económico Correntino, Argentina. Preserved at Paraná Station, Argentina |
| 5455 | 1912 | | 0-4-0 | 1,000 mm (3 ft 3 3/8 in) | 250 hp | Funilense E.B., São Paulo, 4 axle tender, Estrada de Ferro Funilense, N° 8, service weight 26 plus 17 tons |
| 5605 | 1912 | | 0-4-0 | 600 mm (1 ft 11 5/8 in) | 40 hp | N° 2, Kapsa & Müller, Prague |
| 5632 | 1912 | | 0-4-0 | 600 mm (1 ft 11 5/8 in) | 20 hp | Pittsburgh, Pennsylvania. Probably used by Costello & Co., contractors, Philadelphia in the summer of 1912 for installing a sewage disposal plant at Bristol, Pennsylvania. |
| 5658 | 1912 | | 0-4-0 | 600 mm (1 ft 11 5/8 in) | | Stockholms Elektricitetsverk, Untraverket 1, 1916 decommissioned, since 1917 Vattenfall CF 10, decommissioned 1952. |
| 5662 | 1912 | | 0-4-0 | 600 mm (1 ft 11 5/8 in) | 50 hp | Initially Argentina, now Apedale Valley Light Railway. After leaving Statfold Barn Railway for a private site in Whaley Bridge in 2013, it came to Apedale in May 2022 after a full restoration to steam. The original livery from Argentina has been retained by the owners, and it is paired with a tender from its time in Argentina. It will be based at Apedale for the foreseeable future and will operate occasionally on passenger trains throughout the year. |
| | ca 1912 | | 0-4-0 | 600 mm (1 ft 11 5/8 in) | 20 hp | 2-2 coupled tender locomotive, 5.4 tonnes (5.3 long tons; 6.0 short tons) used at the Battles of the Isonzo, 25 May 1918 |
| | ca 1912 | | 0-4-0 | 600 mm (1 ft 11 5/8 in) | 20 hp | Constructor's locomotive of E. Blok, Rotterdam |
| 5668 | 1913 | | 0-4-0 | 600 mm (1 ft 11 5/8 in) or 610 mm (2 ft) | 30 hp | Initially Penrhyn Quarry Railway. 1963 sold to Bressingham Steam and Gardens'. Since 1995 at Bredgar and Wormshill Light Railway. |
| 5672 | 1912 | | 0-6-0 | 600 mm (1 ft 11 5/8 in) | | Petter, No 1, Lindfors-Bosjöns Järnväg |
| 5745 | 1912 | | 0-4-0 | 600 mm (1 ft 11 5/8 in) | 20 hp | Initially Ferrocarriles en el cono sur FCS (Argentina), now Chapel Hydraulique GmbH, Kimmerle-Ring, Günzburg, Germany |
| 5754 | 1913 | | 2-6-0 | 1,000 mm (3 ft 3 3/8 in) | 200 hp | E 94, Vale de Vouga, Comboios de Portugal, Portugal |
| 5755 | 1912 | | 2-6-0 | 1,000 mm (3 ft 3 3/8 in) | 200 hp | E 96, Decauville-Locomotive No. 5755/1913, Vale de Vouga, Comboios de Portugal, Portugal, now Musée des tramways à vapeur et des chemins de fer secondaires français in Butry-sur-Oise in département Val-d'Oise, 30 kilometres (19 mi) north of Paris |
| 5756 | 1913 | | 2-6-0 | 1,000 mm (3 ft 3 3/8 in) | 200 hp | Companhia Real dos Caminhos de Ferro Portuguese E 91, Vale de Vouga, Comboios de Portugal, Portugal |
| 5757 | 1913 | | 2-6-0 | 1,000 mm (3 ft 3 3/8 in) | 200 hp | Companhia Real dos Caminhos de Ferro Portuguese E 97, Vale de Vouga, Comboios de Portugal, Portugal |
| 5767 | 1912 | | 0-4-0T | 600 mm (1 ft 11 5/8 in) | | Italian military railway, Palmanova, FD-3a-III-17 / 1914-18 German military railways / 19xx Argentinia / 200x Preston Services. |
| 5805 | 1912 | | 0-6-0 | 762 mm (2 ft 6 in) | 90 hp | No 201 of Japanese government railways, later LCK 31 of the Taiwaneses government railway, now plinthed in Hualien, Taiwan |
| 5826–5828 | 1913 | | 0-6-0 | 762 mm (2 ft 6 in) | 50 hp | Japanese Railways, Replica exhibited at Uwajima Station (see also 9846/1922, 10838/1924 and 10886/1924) |
| 5744 | 1912 | | 0-4-0 | 600 mm (1 ft 11 5/8 in) | | Initially Obras de Irrigacion del Territoria del Rio Negro, later Moño Azul, near Vista Alegre Sur and Centenario, Neuquén, Argentina, now Rebecca, Devon Railway Centre, Bickleigh, Devon, England |
| 5829 | 1913 | | 0-4-0 | 600 mm (1 ft 11 5/8 in) | 50 hp | Train de Rillé |
| 5834 | 1913 | | 0-4-0 | 610 mm (2 ft) | 20 hp | No 11, P C Allen, weight: 5.57 tonnes. Was in service at a Solvay Alkali Plant in Torrelavega, Spain. Named after the chairman of ICI from 1968 to 1971, who was a light railway enthusiast and instigated the rescue of this locomotive. Now Leighton Buzzard Light Railway. |
| 5855 | 1912 | | 0-8-0 | 760mm | 110hp | U45.905 "Barbora" Považská lesná železnica 1939-1972 Now in preservation at Múzeum Liptovskej dediny, Pribylina, Slovakia |
| 5856 | 1912 | | 0-8-0 | 600 mm (1 ft 11 5/8 in) | 60 hp | Olean 1, PG Olean, Situbondo, Indonesia |
| 5857 | 1912 | | 0-8-0 | 600 mm (1 ft 11 5/8 in) | 60 hp | Sumberharjo 2, PG Sumberharjo, Pemalang, Indonesia |
| 5859 | 1912 | | 0-8-0 | 600 mm (1 ft 11 5/8 in) | 60 hp | Pesantren 9, PG Pesantren Baru, Kediri, Indonesia |
| 5885 | 1912 | | 0-4-0 | 1,067 mm (3 ft 6 in) | 40 hp | Johoku Kotsu Park, Itabashi, Tokio, Japan |
| 5896 and 5897 | 1912 | | 0-8-0 | 600 mm (1 ft 11 5/8 in) | | Nybergs Gruv AB 1 and Nybergs Gruv AB 2, Nyberget Morgårdshammar (Nybergets Järnväg NJ, Nybergs Gruv – Avesta Jernverks AB), Sweden |
| 5896 and 5897 | 1912 | | 0-8-0 | 600 mm (1 ft 11 5/8 in) | | Nybergs Gruv AB 1 and Nybergs Gruv AB 2, Nyberget Morgårdshammar (Nybergets Järnväg NJ, Nybergs Gruv – Avesta Jernverks AB), Sweden |
| 5898 | 1912 | | 0-8-0 | 600 mm (1 ft 11 5/8 in) | 80 hp | Makatea, Tuamotu, French Polynesia |
| 5911 | 1913 | | 0-6-0 | 1,435 mm (4 ft 8 1/2 in) | 650 hp | This was 5000th locomotive built by O&K in 1913 and delivered to the Royal Prussian State Railway Administration as G8 Bromberg 4823, according to a commemorative publication for the 5000th locomotive, later PKP Tp3-75 and DRB 55 1669. |
| 5933 | 1913 | | | | | Putte was used from 1914 to 1934 between Båven and the Likstammen lake (Båven–Likstammen Järnväg, Axalabanan), Sweden |
| 5978 | 1913 | | 0-4-0 | 700 mm (2 ft 3 9/16 in) – 750 mm (2 ft 5 1/2 in) | | Speer, Hammel & Matten, Essen |
| 5990 | 1912 | | originally 0-4-0T, later 0-4-2T | 600 mm (1 ft 11 5/8 in) | 60 hp | Sold in 1912 to Decauville São Paulo (as an agent or reseller), later Craig & Martin Brasil, later Estrada de Ferro Perus – Pirapora – EFPP No. 8 (chemin de fer de Cimento Portland Perus – Cajamar), later converted to 0–6–2, now LP Assessoria Industrial e Restaurações Ltda. – Votorantim, SP |
| 6008 | 1912 | | 0-4-4-0; Mallet | 600 mm (1 ft 11 5/8 in) | 60 hp | Candi 6, Sidoarjo, Indonesia |
| | | | 0-4-0 | 600 mm (1 ft 11 5/8 in) | | The US army confiscated the German locomotive in World War I near Abainville in France and applied the lettering U.S.A. X6023 (but this was not O&K 6023, which was a 0-8-0+T, for sugar mill Tjoekir, Java) |
| 6021 | | | 0-6-0 | 750 mm (2 ft 5 1/2 in) | | Delivered to Cia Azucarera del Toa in Porto Rico. The locomotive of 110 hp could haul a train of 75 sugar cane cars of 1.5 ton capacity each at Central Constancia, Toa Baja, Puerto Rico, a plantation of Compania Azucarera del Toa, San Juan |
| 6023^{?} | 1913 | | 0-8-0T+T | 700 mm (2 ft 3 9/16 in) | 60 hp | Theo, Sugar mill Tjoekir in Jombang, Indonesia |
| 6024 | | | 0-4-4-0; Mallet | 610 mm (2 ft) | | Cia. Minera Penoles-Avalos, Mexico |
| 6163-65 | 1912 | | 0-8-0 | 7500 mm | 200 hp | Ак class 7–9, Beloretsk railway (Uralbahn), Klien-Lindner axles |
| 6254–6255 | 1913 | | 0-10-0 | 1,435 mm (4 ft 8 1/2 in) | | Heavy ten-wheel wet steam locomotive with a Stroomann water tube boiler developed by O&K for the Waltrop (Westphalia) mining inspectorate with the road numbers 20 and 21. Both locomotives received normal superheated steam boilers in 1921. They were subsequently used as no. 22 and 28 in the Gladbeck (Westphalia) harbour area. |
| 6273 | 1913 | | 0-4-0 | 700 mm (2 ft 3 9/16 in) | 90 hp | Lignite mine and briquette Roddergrube, Brühl |
| 6320 | 1913 | | 0-6-0 | 760 mm (2 ft 5 15/16 in) | 30 hp | Elza, former Zrenjanin Sugar locomotive, at Mokra Gora |
| 6039 | 1912 | | 0-8-0 | 600 mm (1 ft 11 5/8 in) | 60 hp | Purwodadi 11, PG Purwodadi, Ngawi, Indonesia |
| 6126 | 1913 | | 0-4-0 | | | Hällefors Bruk, No. 6 |
| 6378 | | | 2-8-0 | 1,435 mm (4 ft 8 1/2 in) | | Ruppiner Eisenbahn, RE 25 |
| 6385-6387 | 1913 | | 0-8-0 | 7500 mm | 200 hp | Ак class 10–12, Beloretsk railway (Uralbahn), Klien-Lindner axles |
| 6389 | 1913 | | 0-8-0 | 600 mm (1 ft 11 5/8 in) | 80 hp | Tasik Madu III, Solo, Java, Indonesia |
| 6395 | 1914 | | 0-4-0 | 600 mm (1 ft 11 5/8 in) | 60 hp | Military railway in Mainz, Germany (Verkehrsoffizier vom Platz Mainz), later Beton & Monierbau |
| | | | 0-4-0 | 600 mm (1 ft 11 5/8 in) | | The US army confiscated the German locomotive in World War I near Abainville in France and applied the lettering U.S.A. X6030 (but this was not O&K 6030, which was a 0–6–0, for Vaterländische Forstindustrie AG, Hungary) |
| | | | | 600 mm (1 ft 11 5/8 in) | | Used by the Imperial German Army at the Western Front of World War I |
| 6476 | 1936 | | 2-8-0 | 1,435 mm (4 ft 8 1/2 in) | | Ruppiner Eisenbahn, RE 26 |
| 6519 | 1913 | | 0-4-0 | 610 mm (2 ft) | 10 hp | Sold via Decauville to the South Australian Irrigation and Reclamation Department in Pompoota on the Murray River |
| 6520 | 1913 | | 0-4-0 | 610 mm (2 ft) | 10 hp | Sold via Decauville to the South Australian Irrigation and Reclamation Department in Pompoota on the Murray River. |
| 6521–6524 | 1914 | | 0-6-6-0T | 1,000 mm (3 ft 3 3/8 in) | 500 hp | Constructor Simon Patino for the Machacamarca-Uncía line in Bolivia, the locos are similar to Brockenbahn N° 3939–3940 of 1910 |
| 6533 | 1913 | | 0-4-0 | 762 mm (2 ft 6 in) | 50 hp | Initially Mitsui Bussan Kaisha, Kobe, now Ikasa Railway, Okayama, Japan |
| 6534 | 1913 | | 0-4-0 | 762 mm (2 ft 6 in) | 50 hp | Initially Mitsui Bussan Kaisha, Kobe, now Classic Golf Club, Shin'ichi, Japan |
| 6535 | 1913 | | 0-4-0 | 762 mm (2 ft 6 in) | 50 hp | Initially Mitsui Bussan Kaisha, Kobe, now Ikada Zoo, Okayama, Japan |
| 6559 | 1914 | | 0-8-0 | 600 mm (1 ft 11 5/8 in) | | Société Sucrière de Pithiviers, Sermaises, second from left in the photo |
| 6602 | 1913 | | 0-4-0 | 600 mm (1 ft 11 5/8 in) | 20 hp | Spanish Morocco |
| 6603 | | | 0-4-0 | 600 mm (1 ft 11 5/8 in) | 20 hp | Ezeiza, Argentina |
| 6620 | 1913 | | 0-4-0 | 600 mm (1 ft 11 5/8 in) | 20 hp | Lotta 1 Östra Södermanlands Järnväg |
| 6625 | 1913 | | 0-4-0T | 600 mm (1 ft 11 5/8 in) | | Joh. Köppe, Bitterfeld, Finkenherd, Strabag, later Museum Prof. Dr. Bandtlow, Passau, preserved as Monika N° 3 at Besucherbergwerk Fortuna, Solms-Oberbiel, Germany |
| 6641 | 1913 | | 0-4-0 | 600 mm (1 ft 11 5/8 in) | 30 hp | Montalban, West Lancashire Light Railway |
| 6655 | 1913 | | 0-4-2 | 3 ft (914 mm) | 50 hp | 2, ordered for FC de Pimentel, Peru |
| 6717 | 1913 | | 0-8-0 | 600 mm (1 ft 11 5/8 in) | 80 hp | Sugar factory of Knight von Horsky, Klien-Lindner axles |
| 6760 | 1913 | | 0-4-0 | 600 mm (1 ft 11 5/8 in) | | Initially gas and electricity works, Stockholm, since 1918 Stockholm 5 at Stockholms Stads Lantegandomsnämnd, since 1933 Smöjens Kalkbrott 4, ausgemustert 1956. |
| 6763 | 1914 | | | | | Gypsum mines at Reisdorf in Luxemburg |
| 6770 | 1914 | | 0-4-0 | 600 mm (1 ft 11 5/8 in) | 40 hp | Smedjebacken, Sweden |
| 6780 | 1913 | | 0-4-0 | 750 mm (2 ft 5 1/2 in) | 50 hp | 'E. V. Aegna Kommandatur N° 1' delivered to Peter the Great's Naval Fortress in Reval (Tallinn), Estonia |
| 6789 | 1913 | | "2/3t" | 600 mm (1 ft 11 5/8 in) | 30 hp | Cia del Ferrocarril de Acambaro a Querétaro Ltd, Mexico |
| 6805 | 1914 | | 0-4-0 | | | Millaquin Mill, Bundaberg, Queensland |
| 6837 | 1914 | | 0-4-0 | 600 mm (1 ft 11 5/8 in) | 30 hp | Delta Hardware Company, Chicago. Possibly used at Rapid River, Michigan |
| 6884 | 1914 | | 0-4-0 | 750 mm (2 ft 5 1/2 in) | 90 hp | 'E. V. Aegna Kommandatur N° 2' delivered to Peter the Great's Naval Fortress in Reval (Tallinn), Estonia |
| 6885 | 1914 | | 0-4-0 | 750 mm (2 ft 5 1/2 in) | 90 hp | 'E. V. Aegna Kommandatur N° 3' delivered to Peter the Great's Naval Fortress in Reval (Tallinn), Estonia |
| 6892 | 1920 | | 0-6-0 | 1,000 mm (3 ft 3 3/8 in) | 60 hp | Puerto de Adra, Spain |
| 6900 | 1920 | | 0-2-0 FL | 600 mm (1 ft 11 5/8 in) | 60 hp | Fireless locomotive of the yeast factory, Delft, then Van het Hof, Pijnakker, rebuilt to 0-4-2T (B1 n2t) at Stoomtrein Katwijk Leiden, preserved at Rissens Leemspoor, Rijssens, Netherlands |
| 6906 | 1914 | | 0-4-0 | 600 mm (1 ft 11 5/8 in) | 20 hp | This loco, or one of its siblings, was used at DuPont Highway road construction at Ellendale, Delaware, 1918 |
| 6937 | 1914 | | 1'0-4-0 | 600 mm (1 ft 11 5/8 in) | 30 hp | Purwodadi 3, PG Purwodadi, Ngawi, Indonesia |
| 6944 | 1913 | | 0-8-0 | 600 mm (1 ft 11 5/8 in) | 100 hp | Purwodadi 5, PG Purwodadi, Ngawi, Indonesia |
| 6946 | 1913 | | 0-8-0 | 600 mm (1 ft 11 5/8 in) | 60 hp | Kedawung 14, PG Kedawung, Pasuruan, Indonesia |
| 6962 | 1913 | | 0-4-0 | 600 mm (1 ft 11 5/8 in) | 20 hp | Valdés Vergara of the Bories meat packing factory, 4 km from Puerto Natales in Chile. It was bought by the Sociedad Explotadora de Tierra del Fuego in 1915. It was restored for the exhibition in the museum of The Singular Patagonia hotel in the old industrial facilities in Puerto Bories. |
| 6976 | 1913 | | 0-4-2 | 600 mm (1 ft 11 5/8 in) | 30 hp | Tasik Madu XV, Solo Java, Indonesia |
| 7000 | 1914 | | 0-4-0 | 600 mm (1 ft 11 5/8 in) | 30 hp | Société Chiron Frères, Montagnole near Chambéry, Savoie with adhesison and rack drive, sister of 3575/1909, photo by Georges Mangin |
| 7020 | 1914 | | 0-8-0 | 600 mm (1 ft 11 5/8 in) | | Brigadelok, HFB, DHM Klien-Lindner axles, HFB-Nr. 239, here shown at the water tank wagon 'Stettin 700149' during WW1 in an album of military railway directorate MED 6 at Brest-Litowsk |
| 7063 | 1915 | | 0-6-0 | 760 mm (2 ft 5 15/16 in) | | Forest railway Rečkov |
| 7067 | | | 0-6-0 | 600 mm (1 ft 11 5/8 in) | 30 hp | Bakrie Sumatera Plantations Railway, Bunut, Kecamatan Kota Kisaran Barat, Kabupaten Asahan, Sumatera Utara, Indonesia |
| 7082, 7082 and 7085 | 1914 | | 0-8-0 | 600 mm (1 ft 11 5/8 in) | 90 hp | Ordere with Klien-Lindner axles for the Kovno fortress 600mm railway (now Kaunas. Loco N° 7083 was delivered Sochaczew in Poland |
| 7086 | 1914 | | 0-4-0 | 750 mm (2 ft 5 1/2 in) | | Tove. Geliefert an Ramseyer & Brechtbühler, Rubigen, Schweiz. Verkauft 1918 an die Baufirma Wright, Thomsen & Kier. Brabrand 1956. |
| 7148 | 1914 | | 2-8-0 | 3 ft (914 mm) | 200 hp | N° 1, ‘Pimentel’ ordered for FC de Pimentel, Peru |
| 7150 | 1914 | | 0-4-4-0; Mallet | | | La France bei Haudainville, beschlagnahmt bei der Firma Rondant & Demenois. |
| 7191–7198 | 1914 | | 0-6-0 | 750 mm (2 ft 5 1/2 in) | 50 hp | Built at the Drewitz works for Peter the Great's Naval Fortress in Reval (Tallinn), Estonia. The Eesti V.R. locomotive T. 110 was industrially used in 1925 |
| 7191–7198 | 1914 | | 0-6-0 | 750 mm (2 ft 5 1/2 in) | 50 hp | Built at the Drewitz works for Peter the Great's Naval Fortress in Reval (Tallinn), Estonia. The Eesti V.R. locomotive Rt235 was still being used in 1935 |
| 7194 | 1914 | | 0-6-0 | 750 mm (2 ft 5 1/2 in) | 50 hp | Initially Peter the Great's Naval Fortress in Reval (Tallinn), Estonia, later military railway on Kirkkomaa Island, Kotka, since 1946 paper mill Äänenkoski, decommissioned in 1964, plinthed since 1982, Äänekoski Selluloosatehdas, Äänekoski, Finland |
| 7206 | 1914 | | 0-10-0 | 750 mm (2 ft 5 1/2 in) | | Peter the Great's Naval Fortress in Reval (Tallinn), Estonia, Eesti VR K2, later at work on the Dmitrovskoye peat railway in Kalinin Oblast |
| 7208 | 1914 | | 0-10-0 | 750 mm (2 ft 5 1/2 in) | | Peter the Great's Naval Fortress in Reval (Tallinn), Estonia, Eesti VR K4 |
| 7228 | 1914 | | 0-4-0 | about 716 mm (2 ft 4 3/16 in) | 50 hp | Brick works O. Stölzel, Gundorf near Leipzig, Germany |
| 7259–7260 | 1915 | | 0-4-0 | 600 mm (1 ft 11 5/8 in) | 20 hp | Construction company Hermann Klammt, Königsberg, later acquired by the chemical factory of earl Pálffy, Sosnowice |
| 7283 | 1920 | | 0-4-0 | 700 mm (2 ft 3 9/16 in) | 20 hp | G.J.A. van Shingerland, Oosterhout |
| 7300 | 1915 | | 0-6-0 | 600 mm (1 ft 11 5/8 in) | | Lotta, Nr. 2, Lindfors-Bosjöns Järnväg |
| 7322 | 1916 | | 0-6-0 | 600 mm (1 ft 11 5/8 in) | | Delivered to Ostdeutsche Eisenbahngesellschaft, Königsberg N° 7, later Waldbahn Schorfheide |
| 7325 | 1920 | | 0-6-0 | 600 mm (1 ft 11 5/8 in) | | Ojakkala–Olkkala railway, now heritage railway in Kowjoki, Finland |
| 7333 | ca 1915 | | 0-6-0 | 600 mm (1 ft 11 5/8 in) | 30 hp | Koppel Equipment in use in Wayne County, Michigan |
| 7422 | 1914 | | 0-4-0 | 600 mm (1 ft 11 5/8 in) | 40 hp | Office of the Malzov Works |
| 7424–7432 | 1914 | | 0-6-0 | 716 mm (2 ft 4 3/16 in) | | Ordered for Grodno Fortress, taken over and delivered to HFB, Depot Rehagen-Klausdorf (DRK), handed over to the inspection of the transport troops in Kruschwitz |
| 7346 and 7347 | 1916 | | 0-4-0 | 600 mm (1 ft 11 5/8 in) | 30 hp | Materials Depot, Wrocław forest administration Bialowitz, Poland |
| 7429 | 1914 | | 0-6-0 | 600 mm (1 ft 11 5/8 in) | 50 hp | Chemin de fer des Chanteraines |
| | vor 1918 | | 0-4-0 | 600 mm (1 ft 11 5/8 in) | | Used on the narrow gauge railway at Florina, Greece |
| 7443 | 1919 | | 0-4-0 | 600 mm (1 ft 11 5/8 in) | 50 hp | Nr. 3 Dylta, Östra Södermanlands Järnväg |
| 7446 | 1916 | | 0-4-0 | 760 mm (2 ft 5 15/16 in) | 40 hp | Lotte, Phönix Stahlwerk, J. C. Bleckmann, Hönigsberg, Austria |
| 7459 | 1921 | | 0-6-0 | 700 mm (2 ft 3 9/16 in) | | Erst De Danske Hedeselskab, Jllan, heute Hedelands Veteranbane, Høje-Taastrup Kommune, Dänemark |
| 7479 | 1918 | | 0-4-0 | 600 mm (1 ft 11 5/8 in) | 30 hp | Lukas, initially gravel pit Kissingen near Augsburg, later Schinznach-Dorf, Baumschulbahn (orchard railway), Converted into a tram engine |
| 7523 | 1914 | | 0-4-0 | 1,435 mm (4 ft 8 1/2 in) | | Initially in service with Piaggio of Finale Ligure and then sold to Pirelli |
| 7529 | | | 0-4-0 | 600 mm (1 ft 11 5/8 in) | | Golden Valley Light Railway near Swanwick, Derbyshire, UK |
| 7564 | 1916 | | 0-4-0 | 600 mm | 50 hp | Initially Königl. Militärbauamt Paderborn-Sennelager. Later k.u.k. Militärbergbau, Prijedor, kukHB IIe 910 |
| 7610 | 1918 | | 0-4-0 | 762 mm (2 ft 6 in) | 60 hp | Lime and Marl Plants Heinrich Möller, now Railway Museum Bochum-Dahlhausen |
| 7642 | 1922 | | 0-6-0 | 762 mm | | Initially Towada Railway & Co., Sanbongi-machi, Schi-no-hara, later Izumo, Ōigawa Tetsudō, Japan |
| 7683 | 1919 | | 0-6-0 | 747 mm | 200 hp | Railway regiment, Madrid, Spain |
| 7696 | 1919 | | 0-4-0 | 643 mm | | No. 5, Karolina, Delary-Strömsnäsbruks Järnväg, Sweden |
| 7697 | 1920 | | 0-4-0 | 600 mm (1 ft 11 5/8 in) | | Bromberger Kreisbahn |
| | 1920 | | | 750 mm (2 ft 5 1/2 in) | | O&K No. 12, Bañoles, Palamós–Girona–Banyoles railway. They had six O&K locomotives, which had been built in 1910 for a contractor in Belgium. Five of these were 0-4-0 and one was 0–4–2. They were numbered 11 to 16 and were called Andrea, Bañoles, Celrá, Cornellá, Mercedes and Gerona. |
| | ca 1920 | | 0-4-0 | | ca 20 hp | |
| 7729 | 1914 | | 0-6-0 | 785 mm (2 ft 6 29/32 in) | 140 hp | Basaltine, initially Basalt AG, Linz am Rhein, later playground at Bad Godesberg, now Rheinisches Industriebahn-Museum, Cologne, Germany |
| 7767 | 1914 | | | 600 mm (1 ft 11 5/8 in) | | Stavsjö Järnväg, N° 3, Kolmården with a superheated boiler, transferred in 1940 to Munkedals Järnväg as their N° 5, decommissioned in 1955 |
| 7769 | 1918 | | | 891 mm (2 ft 11 3/32 in) (Swedish 3 ft gauge) | | Stockholm–Roslagens Järnvägar No. 33 († 1946) |
| 7776–7780 | 1915 | | 0-4-0 | 760 mm (2 ft 5 15/16 in) | 90 hp | Lenz & Co GmbH, Berlin (Lenz Com 1379) |
| 7850 | | | 0-6-0 | | | Narrow gauge urban railway Jabłonna-Karczew, Poland |
| 7899 | 1921 | | 0-4-0 | 750 mm (2 ft 5 1/2 in) | | Zakłady Starachowickie 9, Starachowice, Polen |
| 7875 | 1914 | | 0-8-0 | 600 mm (1 ft 11 5/8 in) | 70 hp | Pangka 9, PG Pangka, Slawi near Tegal, Indonesia |
| 7878 | 1914 | | 0-8-0 | 600 mm (1 ft 11 5/8 in) | 70 hp | Gempolkerep 11, Mojokerto, Indonesia |
| | 1914 | | D h2t | 785 mm (2 ft 6 29/32 in) | | Oberschlesische Schmalspurbahn, Prussian T 38, Kattowitz 211 to 37, DR 99 411–421, 32,25 t |
| | ca 1914 | | C'1 n2t | 1,000 mm (3 ft 3 3/8 in) | | Ferrocarril Argentino del Norte |
| | before 1918 | | 0–10–0, Luttermöller | 600 mm (1 ft 11 5/8 in) | 90 hp | German military locomotive on the western front of world war I, |
| | ca 1919 | | E h2 | 785 mm (2 ft 6 29/32 in) | | Oberschlesische Schmalspurbahn, Prussian T 39, gear-driven rear axles, System Luttermöller |
| 7900 | 1921 | | 0-4-0 | 750 mm (2 ft 5 1/2 in) | | Narrow gauge railway Rogów–Biała Rawska. She was working together with her twin 7899 in Starachowice. Now exhibited in Rogów railway museum. |
| 7908 | 1917 | | 0-6-0 | 600 mm (1 ft 11 5/8 in) | | Heeresfeldbahn No 508 B, 99.3-016, Baba Milka, Niš, Serbia |
| 7912 | 1916 | | 0-4-0 | 760 mm (2 ft 5 15/16 in) | | Birkfeld-Ratten drag line (Feistritztalbahn), where it replaced locomotive 1 'Meran' from 1942. On 1 December 1943, it collided with a GKB goods train, killing the driver |
| 7961 | 1917 | | 0-8-0 | 891 mm (2 ft 11 3/32 in) (Swedish 3 ft gauge) | | Bahnstrecke Nordmark–Klarälven, Sweden |
| 7999 | 1914 | | 0-8-0 | 600 mm (1 ft 11 5/8 in) | | Heeresfeldbahn Brigadelok No 482, depot administration of the 1. Eb-Brigade, Rehagen-Klausdorf (am Mellensee), later Polish State Railways PKP No 4232, since 1945 No ML 631 Latvian Railways LVD, since 1994 No ML 631, Museum of Maritime Fishing, Ventspils, Lithuania |
| 8065 | 1916 | | 0-6-0 | 1,067 mm (3 ft 6 in) | | Initially Rotterdamsche Tramweg Maatschappij No. 54, Hellevoetsluis, now Rotterdamsche Tramweg Museum RTM, Ouddorp, Netherlands |
| 8076 | 1921 | | 0-4-0 | 750 mm (2 ft 5 1/2 in), also listed as 900 mm (2 ft 11 7/16 in) | 90 hp | Ferrocarril de Mallorca |
| 8083 | 1915 | | 0-4-0 | 600 mm (1 ft 11 5/8 in) | | Tramway de Pithiviers à Toury and Chemin de fer Froissy-Dompierre |
| 8090 | 1916 | | 0-8-0 | 600 mm (1 ft 11 5/8 in) | 1000 hp | Rejosari 10 Salak, PG Rejosari, Madiun, Indonesia |
| 8165 | 1916 | | 0-6-0 | 750 mm (2 ft 5 1/2 in) | | Initially WKD 66, later Ty3-1162, Museum Sochaczew |
| 8233 | 1916 | | 0-8-0 | 600 mm (1 ft 11 5/8 in) | 300 hp | Brigadelok, HFB N° 640, here shown at Thiaucourt incline |
| 8242 | 1917 | | 0-6-0 | 600 mm (1 ft 11 5/8 in) | 50 hp | The chalk inscription reads Jagdstaffel N°11§. The § sign was probably applied in the style of ‘§11 porro bibitur’. The Jasta 11 was the famous Richthofen squadron. The locomotive is one of the 24 Cn2t engines that O&K delivered to the 1st EB Berlin-Schöneberg for the Rehagen-Klausdorf depot in 1917. |
| 8244–8247 | 1916 | | 0-6-0T | 700 mm (2 ft 3 9/16 in) | 70 hp | Donon Light Railway, Vosges |
| 8271 | 1916 | | 0-8-0 | 600 mm (1 ft 11 5/8 in) | | Depot administration of the 1. Eb-Brigade, Rehagen-Klausdorf (am Mellensee) "853", since 1920 4CL-5 or ML 629 Latvian Railways LVD, since 1994 im agricultural museum Talsi, Latvia |
| 8275 | 1917 | | 0-8-0 | 600 mm (1 ft 11 5/8 in) | | HF 857 was built by O&K as N° 8275/1917 and delivered to the depot of the 1st Railway Brigade in Berlin-Schöneberg on 13 January 1917 and dispatched to Rehagen-Klausdorf. After being used presumably in the Baltic States, it remained there and was given the PKP number 4229 in 1920. In 1942, under the administration of DR East, it was assigned to Janòw Poleski depot, which was also home to other brigade locomotives. |
| 8285 | 1917 | | 0-10-0 | 600 mm (1 ft 11 5/8 in) | | Initially Thalbahn Habsheim, later Tramway de Pithiviers à Toury No. 5-3, now Chemin de fer Froissy-Dompierre |
| 8291–8292 | 1916 | | 0-6-0T | 700 mm (2 ft 3 9/16 in) | 70 hp | Donon Light Railway, Vosges |
| 8293 | 1916 | | 0-6-0 | 700 mm | 70 hp | Initially Dononbahn, later Waldeisenbahn Alberschweiler, later Lambert Freres, Cormeilles-en-Parisis, now Stoomtrein Katwijk Leiden |
| 8294 | 1916 | | 0-6-0T | 700 mm (2 ft 3 9/16 in) | 70 hp | Donon Light Railway, Vosges |
| 8329 | 1917 | | 0-8-0 | 600 mm (1 ft 11 5/8 in) | | Heeresfeldbahn, Depot Rehagen-Klausdorf (DRK), Klien-Lindner axles, operator's N° 1282, here shown at Sperenberg, in 1919 transferred to Lettland as ML 608 |
| 8418 | 1917 | | 0-6-0 | Initially 600 mm (1 ft 11 5/8 in), since 1919 760 mm (2 ft 5 15/16 in) | | Depot administration of the 1. Eb-Brigade, Rehagen-Klausdorf (am Mellensee) No 487, since 1919 Hungarian forest railway No 357.305, later plinthed, saw mill Lenti, sice 1996 plinthed at saw mill Csömödér |
| 8421 | 1917 | | 0-6-0 | 600 mm (1 ft 11 5/8 in) | 50 hp | HFB, DRK N° 490 |
| 8457 | 1921 | | 0-4-0 | 600 mm | 20 hp | Spain, preserved at Museum Ponferrada, Spain ex Antracitas Gaiztarro |
| 8496 | 1918 | | 0-6-0T | 760 mm (2 ft 5 15/16 in) | 50 hp | Delivered to kuk Ministry of Defence. Loaned from Pardubice to Michalovce in 1937/1938 for forest railway Michalovce-Lake Morské in Slovakia. The Michalovce-Jovsa forest railway with a branch to Kolačkov was taken over by the Ministry of National Defense in 1938. |
| 8500 | 1918 | | | | | Mariska, Goods railway station Dúbrava (now Vysoká pri Morave zastávka), Zohor–Záhorská Ves railway, Slovakia |
| 8575 | 1918 | | 0-8-0 | 600 mm (1 ft 11 5/8 in) | | Nr. 1958, Depot administration of the 1. Eb-Brigade, Rehagen-Klausdorf (am Mellensee), later Tx 1958 Polish forest administration ZKL, forest railway Hajnowka, since 1987 railway museum Sochaczew, Poland |
| 8590 | 1918 | | 0-8-0 | 600 mm (1 ft 11 5/8 in) | 65 hpi | Tx 1113, Płociczno, Poland |
| | 1918 | | 0-8-0 | 600 mm (1 ft 11 5/8 in) | 65 hpi | Tx 1114, Czarna Białostocka, Poland |
| 8594 | 1918 | | 0-8-0 | 600 mm (1 ft 11 5/8 in) | 70 hp | Initially T.P. Ruvenhorst & Humbert, now Association pour la préservation et l'entretien du matériel à voie étroite, Saint-Germain-d'Arcé, France |
| 8627 | 1918 | | 0-8-0 | 600 mm (1 ft 11 5/8 in) | 70 hp | Initially Heeresfeldbahn Brigadelok No. 13, later Sucreries Coucy-le-Château, now Chemin de fer Froissy-Dompierre |
| 8669 | 1920 | | 0-6-0 | 1,435 mm (4 ft 8 1/2 in) | | Nässjö-Oskarshamns Järnväg, Sweden, N° 26, SJ 1776, Service weight: 36,0 tonnes. Axle weight: 36,0 t. Axle load: 12,0 t. Tractive force: 6,0 t. Length over buffers: 8577 mm |
| 8713 | 1918 | | 0-10-0T+T | 600 mm (1 ft 11 5/8 in) | 90 hp | Heeresfeldbahn (HFB), Depot Rehagen-Klausdorf (DRK), HF N° 2638, Mecklenburg-Pommersche Schmalspurbahn (MPSB) Operators N° 17^{II} |
| 8718 | 1918 | | 0-10-0 | 600 mm (1 ft 11 5/8 in) | | Heeresfeldbahn No 2643 with outer frame and Luttermöller first and fifth axles |
| 8719 | 1919 | | 0-10-0T+T | 600 mm (1 ft 11 5/8 in) | 90 hp | Heeresfeldbahn (HFB), Depot Rehagen-Klausdorf (DRK), HF N° 2644, Mecklenburg-Pommersche Schmalspurbahn (MPSB) Operators N° 18^{II} |
| | ca 1919 | | 0-4-0 | 600 mm (1 ft 11 5/8 in) | | 5,4 t, heated by wood or coal |
| | ca 1919 | | 0-6-0 | 600 mm (1 ft 11 5/8 in) | | 10,2 t, heated by wood or coal |
| | ca 1919 | | 0-4-0 | 900–1,000 mm (3 ft 3 3/8 in) | | 20 t |
| | ca 1919 | | 0-8-0 | 750 mm (2 ft 5 1/2 in) | 110 hp | 21 t |
| | ca 1919 | | | | | Egypt |
| | ca 1919 | | | | | Chemin de fer de Zambezia, Mozambique |
| 8800 | 1920 | | 0-4-0 | 600 mm (1 ft 11 5/8 in) | 50 hp | Niederlausitzer Kohlenwerke (open cast lignite mines) |
| 8998 | 1923 | | 0-10-0T | 1,000 mm (3 ft 3 3/8 in) | 200 hp | Railway Directorate Erfurt, Railway Station Meiningen, DRB 99 183, at DR converted in 1959 to 2-6-2T |
| 9067 | 1920 | | 0-4-0 | 900 mm (2 ft 11 7/16 in) | 160 hp | Gemeentewerken, Deventer |
| 9147 | 1919 | | 0-6-0 | | | Cement factory Klagshamn, Sweden |
| 9103 | 1920 | | 0-8-0 | 600 mm (1 ft 11 5/8 in) | 60 hp | Rejosari 6 Arjuna, PG Rejosari, Madiun, Indonesia |
| 9135 | 1920 | | 0-4-0 | 700 mm (2 ft 3 9/16 in) | 50 hp | Overysselsche Steenfabriek, Deventer, Netherlands |
| 9193 | 1920 | | 0-6-0 | 1,067 mm (3 ft 6 in) | | Erst Rotterdamsche Tramweg Maatschappij No. 56, Hellevoetsluis, heute Rotterdamsche Tramweg Museum RTM, Ouddorp, Netherlands |
| 9199 | 1920 | | 0-6-0 | | | Hällefors Bruk, No. 8, Sweden |
| 9234 | 1920 | | 0-4-0 | 40 hp | | Zylhoff & Zoon, brick factory De Vooruitgang in Terwolde, Netherlands |
| 9244 | 1925 | | 0-4-0 | 600 mm (1 ft 11 5/8 in) | 40 hp | Frankfurter Feldbahnmuseum No 18 |
| 9295 | 1922 | | 0-10-0 | 1,524 mm (5 ft) | 650 hp | Nydquist & Holm, Sweden for Soviet Russia goods locomotive with T4 Locomotive factory in Trollhättan N° 5080 class E.g. |
| | 1922 | | 0-10-0 | 1,524 mm (5 ft) | | |
| 9307 | 1920 | | 0-8-0 | 600 mm (1 ft 11 5/8 in) | 60 hp | Gempolkerep 18, Mojokerto, Indonesia |
| 9308 | 1920 | | 0-8-0 | 600 mm (1 ft 11 5/8 in) | 70 hp | Gempolkerep 2, Mojokerto, Indonesia |
| 9309 | 1920 | | 0-8-0 | 600 mm (1 ft 11 5/8 in) | 60 hp | Purwodadi 15, PG Purwodadi, Ngawi, Indonesia |
| 9310 | 1920 | | 0-8-0 | 600 mm (1 ft 11 5/8 in) | 70 hp | Wonolangan 3, PG Wonolangan, Probolinggo, Indonesia |
| 9349 | 1920 | | 0-8-0 | 600 mm (1 ft 11 5/8 in) | 90 hp | Tulungagung 2, Mojopanggung, Java, Indonesia |
| 9356 | 1920 | | 0-8-0 | 600 mm (1 ft 11 5/8 in) | 60PS | Kebonagung 10, PG Kebonagung, Malang, Indonesia |
| 9358 | 1920 | | 0-8-0 | 600 mm (1 ft 11 5/8 in) | 60 hp | Olean 5, PG Olean, Situbondo, Indonesia |
| 9382 | 1920 | | 0-8-0 | 600 mm (1 ft 11 5/8 in) | 80 hp | Prajekan 3, jetzt Asembagus 3, Asembagus, Situbondo Indonesia |
| 9412 | 1920 | | 0-8-0 | 600 mm (1 ft 11 5/8 in) | 60 hp | Asembagus 5, Asembagus, Situbondo Indonesia |
| 9414 | 1920 | | 0-6-0 | 1,000 mm (3 ft 3 3/8 in) | | Ingenio Ledesma, Argentina |
| 9418 | 1920 | | 0-6-0 | 600 mm (1 ft 11 5/8 in) | | KJI Nr. 23, Nr. 99 4301, Kleinbahnen des Kreises Jerichow I |
| 9423 | 1920 | | 0-6-0 | 760 mm (2 ft 5 15/16 in) | 90 hp | Forestry railway near Spišská Nová Ves (Slovakia), Reiner & Mandula, Iglo sawmill Nalepkovo forestry railway Zakamenne N° 2, scrapped in 1965 |
| 9429 | 1920 | | 0-8-0 | 600 mm (1 ft 11 5/8 in) | 60 hp | Purwodadi 1^{II}, PG Purwodadi, Ngawi, Indonesia |
| 9430 | 1920 | | 0-8-0 | 600 mm (1 ft 11 5/8 in) | 60 hp | Pagottan 3, PG Pagottan, Madiun, Indonesia |
| 9441; 9442; 9443; 9444; 9445; 9449 | 1920 | | 0-4-0 | 500 mm (19 3/4 in) | 20 hp | Soc Francaise des Charbonnages du Tonkin (Vietnam) |
| 9447 | 1910 | | 0-8-0 | 600 mm (1 ft 11 5/8 in) | 80 hp | Kanigoro 5, PG Kanigoro, Madiun, Indonesia |
| 9491 | 1921 | | 0-6-0 | 1,435 mm (4 ft 8 1/2 in) | 400 hp | N° 3 of Zschornewitzer Kleinbahn (ZKB) |
| 9550 and 9551 | 1921 | | 0-6-0 | 762 mm (2 ft 6 in) | | Oficina Peña Chica, Tarapacá Region, Chile |
| 9454 | 1921 | | 1D | 750 mm (2 ft 5 1/2 in) | | No. 7 Loviisa-Vesijärvi railway, now Jokioinen Museum Railway, Finland |
| 9459 | 1920 | | 0-6-0 | 600 mm (1 ft 11 5/8 in) | | Initially De Maas 3, now Asembagus 11, Asembagus, Situbondo, Indonesia |
| 9468 | 1921 | | 0–8–0, Luttermöller | | | Usina Santa Terezinha No. 14, Água Preta, Brazil |
| 9526 | 1921 | | 0–10–0, Luttermöller | 600 mm (1 ft 11 5/8 in) | 90 hp | Military locomotive 'E6' of the Imperial Japanese Army Field Railway |
| 9537 | 1921 | | 0–10–0, Luttermöller | 600 mm (1 ft 11 5/8 in) | 90 hp | Military locomotive 'E17' of the Imperial Japanese Army Field Railway, |
| 9521–9545 o. 11071-11076 | 1921 or 1925 | | 0–10–0, Luttermöller | 600 mm (1 ft 11 5/8 in) | 90 hp | Military locomotive 'E1'-'E18' or 'E101'-'E106' of the Imperial Japanese Army Field Railway, |
| 9576 | 1921 | | 0-4-0 | 600 mm (1 ft 11 5/8 in) | 20 hp | Santianes, Minas de Teverga, Hullasa El Entreao, Asturias, Spain |
| 9567–9569 | 1923 | | 0-6-0 | 762 mm (2 ft 6 in) | | Delivered as new to 'Okinawa Kenoko Tetsudo', verso stamped '13 March 1945, Passed by Construction Battalion No. 101' |
| 9584 | 1921 | | 0-4-0 | 600 mm (1 ft 11 5/8 in) | | Smedjebackens Valsverks AB, Sweden, N° 4 Erk preserved in Sunne, Sweden |
| 9601-9650 | 1921-1922 | | 0-8-0 | 1,435 mm (4 ft 8 1/2 in) | 650 hp | Super heated twin freight locomotive with Schmidt smoke tube superheater for coal and oil, 55 km/h, axle pressure 17 t, for 1400 t trains, delivered to the Romanian State Railways |
| 9684 | 1922 | | 0-4-0 | 1,000 mm (3 ft 3 3/8 in) | 200 hp | Staatliche Waldbahnbauleitung Ruhpolding, Greifenberger Kleinbahn, operator's No 53, after 1945 PKP Tyb6-3401 (redesigned to 0-6-0T) |
| 9685 | 1922 | | 0-6-2 | 1,000 mm (3 ft 3 3/8 in) | | Initially Lok II of Staatliche Waldbahn Ruhpolding–Reit im Winkl, since 1940 Kleinbahn Leer–Aurich–Wittmund 14 |
| 9704 | 1921 | | 0-4-0 | 600 mm (1 ft 11 5/8 in) | 40 hp | Semboro 6, PG Semboro, Jember, Java, Indonesia |
| 9752 | 1921 | | | | | Wakataka, Diorama Kyoto, Japan |
| 9785 | 1921 | | 0-6-0 | 1,000 mm (3 ft 3 3/8 in) | | Delivered to sugar factory Sobbowitz (785mm gauge), Ty 9785 of the sugar mill Gryfice, now exhibited at Pommersche Schmalspurbahnen in Gryfice |
| 9862 | 1921 | | 0-4-0 | 600 mm (1 ft 11 5/8 in) | | Hoogovens in IJmuiden |
| 9864 | 1922 | | 0-6-0 | 2 ft 6 in (762 mm) | 50 hp | N° 5 of the Uwajima Railway, the predecessor of the Yosan Line, shown here as Ke 223 of the government |
| 9881 | 1921 | | 0-4-0 | 600 mm (1 ft 11 5/8 in) | 40 hp | I, Zuckerfabrik PG Tasik Madu, I, Solo, Java, Indonesia |
| 9900 | 1921 | | 0-4-0 | 900 mm (2 ft 11 7/16 in) | | ABM, N° 142 |
| 9906 | 1922 | | 0-8-0 | 600 mm (1 ft 11 5/8 in) | 150 hp | Kebonagung 7, PG Kebonagung, Malang, Indonesia |
| 9908 | 1920 | | 0-4-0 | 1,000 mm (3 ft 3 3/8 in) | | Ingenio Ledesma, Argentina |
| 9998 | | | | 610 mm (2 ft) | | Elouise, initially Matas Nacionais, Portugal, now Old Kiln Light Railway at Rural Life Living Museum in Tilford, near Farnham, Surrey |
| 10001-10018 | 1922-1923 | | 0-10-0 | 1,435 mm (4 ft 8 1/2 in) | 650 hp | Super heated twin freight locomotive with Schmidt smoke tube superheater for coal and oil, DRB class G10, with tender for 16.5 m^{3} of water and 7 tonnes of coal |
| 10119 | 1923 | | 0-6-0 | 1,435 mm (4 ft 8 1/2 in) | 400 hp | Bergwerksgesellschaft Hibernia, Herne, North Rhine-Westphalia, operation number 31 |
| 10145 | 1922 | | 0-4-0 | 600 mm (1 ft 11 5/8 in) | 20 hp | Stoomtrein Katwijk Leiden |
| 10154 | 1922 | | 0-6-0 | 760 mm (2 ft 5 15/16 in) | 90 hp | Zreče, Slovenia. Nos 10151–10180 were delivered to the SHS state railways (State of Slovenes, Croats and Serbs, later Kingdom of Yugoslavia) as German World War I reparations. |
| 10155 | 1922 | | 0-6-0T | 760 mm (2 ft 5 15/16 in) | | Jugoslovenske Železnice, No 11034, JDŽ 71-014 |
| 10156 | 1922 | | 0-6-0 | 760 mm (2 ft 5 15/16 in) | | Initially O-VIII, later SHS 3006, Jesenice Ironworks, later stored at Upper Sava Valley Museum, Jesenice, Slovenia |
| 10157–10177 | 1922 | | 0-6-0 | 760 mm (2 ft 5 15/16 in) | | Jugoslovenske Železnice, Nos 11021–11042, JDŽ 71–001 to 71–013 and 71–015 to 71–022 |
| 10168 | 1922 | | 0-6-0 | 760 mm (2 ft 5 15/16 in) | | Initially O-IX, later 71-012, Slovenian Railway Museum, Ljubljana operational, in use at Zreče, Slovenia |
| 10236 | 1922 | | 0-6-0T | 1,435 mm (4 ft 8 1/2 in) | 350 hp | Allgemeine deutsche Kleinbahn Gesesellschaft for Kleinbahn Aschersleben-Schneidlingen-Nienhagen, Operator's N° 7 and later N° 35, in 1950 renumbered to DR 89 6309 |
| 10261 | 1921 | | 0-6-0T+T | 600 mm (1 ft 11 5/8 in) | 50 hp | Lolita, built for Alfonso Pasquel, La Orduña Sugar Mill, Coatepec, Veracruz, Mexico |
| 10286 | 1926 | | 0-8-0 | 600 mm (1 ft 11 5/8 in) | 90 hp | Merican 7, PG Merican, Kediri, Indonesia |
| 10309 | 1922 | | 0-6-0 | 600 mm (1 ft 11 5/8 in) | 30 hp | Pulau Raja 2, Pulau Raja (PTP VI), Indonesia |
| 10312 | 1922 | | 0-6-0 | 1,067 mm (3 ft 6 in) | 140 hp | Originally built for Niigata Harbor Railway, Awa Denki Kido Kaisha, Japan |
| 10327 | 1922 | | 0–8–0, Klien-Lindner axles | 747 mm | 200 hp, saturated steam | Spanish Government, Ministry of War, Spain, allowing curves of 35 metres (115 ft) radius |
| 10372 | 1922 | | 0-8-0 | 600 mm (1 ft 11 5/8 in) | 90 hp | Pesantren 8, PG Pesantren Baru, Kediri, Indonesia |
| 10431 | 1922 | | 0-4-0 | 500 mm (19 3/4 in) | 10 hp | Soc Agricola, Puente Pietra, Peru, probably used in Santa Rosa, Pueblo Nuevo, Chincha |
| 10442 | 1923 | | 0-8-0 | 600 mm (1 ft 11 5/8 in) | 150 hp | Pagottan 8, PG Pagottan, Madiun, Indonesia |
| 10443 | 1923 | | 0-8-0 | 600 mm (1 ft 11 5/8 in) | 60 hp | Gempolkerep 3L, Mojokerto, Indonesia |
| 10447 | 1923 | | 0-6-0 | 600 mm (1 ft 11 5/8 in) | 30 hp | Kept on stock in Mexico, then delivered to Cia Manufacturera de Cemento SA La Cruz, Cruz Azul, Hidalgo Province, Mexico |
| 10448 | 1923 | | 0-6-0 | 600 mm (1 ft 11 5/8 in) | 30 hp | Cia Manufacturera de Cemento SA La Cruz, Cruz Azul, Hidalgo Province, Mexico |
| 10458 | 1923 | | 0-8-0 | 600 mm (1 ft 11 5/8 in) | 70 hp | Wonolangan 6, PG Wonolangan, Probolinggo, Indonesia |
| 10462 | 1921 | | 0-8-0 | 600 mm (1 ft 11 5/8 in) | 80 hp | Tasik Madu V, Solo Java, Indonesia |
| 10491 and 10492 | 1923 | | 0-8-0 | 600 mm (1 ft 11 5/8 in) | 250 hp | Delivered via H. B. Sloman & Co. to Oficina Brac, around 1978 lying derelict at Oficina Victoria, Chile |
| 10497 | 1922 | | 0-8-2T | | | Caminho de Ferro de Luanda, Angola, Nº 61, Classe 60 |
| 10499 | 1925 | | 0-8-2T | | | Caminho de Ferro de Moçâmedes, Angola, Nº 68, Classe 60 |
| 10501 | 1923 | | 0-8-0 | 750 mm (2 ft 5 1/2 in) | 170 hpi | KJI Nr. 15 der Kleinbahnen des Kreises Jerichow I |
| 10542 | 1923 | | 0-6-0 | 760 mm (2 ft 5 15/16 in) | | CFR 763.148, delivered via subsidiary in Budapest an Căile Ferate Forestiere (governmental forest railways) geliefert, now railway museum Sibiu, Romania |
| 10548 | 1923 | | 0-6-0 | 600mm | | Erst Kungl Domänstyrelsen, Askekärr works, Stockholm, since 1937 Malma–Haggården railway, Kinnekleva, ca 1939 Nya Asfalt AB, ca 1942 Avesta Jernverks AB, since 1963 plinthed at Avesta, later Nr. 10, Avesta, Östra Södermanlands Järnväg |
| 10550 | 1923 | | | | | Forest railway in Sweden |
| 10551 | 1923 | | 0-4-0 | 600 mm (1 ft 11 5/8 in) | | Empresa Mineira do Lena, Portugal |
| 10570 | 1924 | | 0-6-0 | 760 mm (2 ft 5 15/16 in) | | Beregszentmiklós and 1937 Latorica, Ukraine |
| 10580 | 1923 | | 0-6-0 | 1,067 mm (3 ft 6 in) | 180 hp | Kajyma Sangyo Railway, Nippon Carbide 1, preserved at Uozu, Japan (see also N° 10613/1913) |
| 10591 | 1923 | | 0-8-0 | 600 mm (1 ft 11 5/8 in) | 60 hp | Sindanglaut 13, PG Sindanglaut 13, Cirebon Java, Indonesia |
| 10597 | 1923 | | 0-6-0 | 700 mm (2 ft 3 9/16 in) | 90 hp | Sakskøbing Sukkerfabrik N° B1, Denmark |
| 10606 | 1923 | | 0-10-0 | 600 mm (1 ft 11 5/8 in) | 120 hp | Pagottan 6, PG Pagottan, Madiun, Indonesia |
| 10607 | 1934 | | 0-8-0 | 600 mm (1 ft 11 5/8 in) | 150 hp | Gempolkerep 12, Mojokerto, Indonesia |
| 10613 | 1923 | | 0-6-0 | 1,067 mm (3 ft 6 in) | 180 hp | Kajyma Sangyo Railway, Nippon Carbide 2, preserved at Namerikawa, Japan, Japan (see also N° 10580/1923) |
| | | | 0-6-0 | 600 mm (1 ft 11 5/8 in) | | N° 102 and N° 103, Sugar mill La Poveda in Arganda del Rey near Madrid, Spain |
| 10660 | 1923 | | 0-6-0 | 600 mm (1 ft 11 5/8 in) | | N° 104, Sugar mill La Poveda in Arganda del Rey near Madrid, Spain |
| 10677 and 10678 | 1928 | | 0-6-2 | 900 mm (2 ft 11 7/16 in) | 350 hp | Bergwitzer Braunkohlen AG, Bergwitz, superheated steam overburden locomotive heated by lignite |
| 10726 | 1923 | | 0-6-0 | 760 mm (2 ft 5 15/16 in) | | Via subsidiary in Budapest to Wenkheim farm, Mosonszentmiklós, Ungarn, later Hungarian State Railways, forest railway Csömödér No 357.314, finally (shown at the front) Széchenyi-Museumsbahn, Nagycenk, Ungarn |
| 10738 | 1924 | | 0-8-0 | 600 mm (1 ft 11 5/8 in) | 80 hp | Wringinanom 2, PG Wringinanom, Situbondo, Indonesia |
| 10739 | 1924 | | 0-8-0 | 600 mm (1 ft 11 5/8 in) | 80 hp | Tasik Madu IV, Solo Java, Indonesia |
| 10740 | 1923 | | B1 n2t | | | Merican 5, PG Merican, Kediri, Indonesia |
| 10750 | 1923 | | 0-6-0+t | 600 mm (1 ft 11 5/8 in) | | Initially Sragi 14 Max, now Statfold Barn Railway |
| 10781 | 1924 | | 0-6-0+t | 2 ft (610 mm) | 30hp | Hacienda San Juan Bautista, Tuzamapan, Veracruz, México |
| 10808 | 1924 | | 0-6-0 | 610 mm (2 ft) | 90 hp | No. 6 Pedemoura was used in the Duero valley in Portugal, to transport coal from the Minas de Pejao to a jetty on the river. Now preserved on the Leighton Buzzard Light Railway. |
| 10844 | 1924 | | 0-8-0 | 750 mm (2 ft 5 1/2 in) | | Trusetal of Trusebahn |
| 10857 | 1924 | | 0-6-0WT | | | Companhia do Assúcar de Angola, Fazenda S. Francisco, Dombe Grande, Nº 6 |
| 10859 | 1925 | | 0-6-0 (C h2t) | 1,000 mm (3 ft 3 3/8 in) | 200 hp | Kehdinger Kreisbahn, N° 5", transferred on 21 February 1938 to Sylter Inselbahn as N° 2", scrapped 1951 |
| 10891 | 1925 | | 0-8-0 | 600 mm (1 ft 11 5/8 in) | | Tulungagung 3, Mojopanggung, Java, Indonesia |
| 10903 | 1925 | | 0-4-0 | 914 mm (3 ft) | 90 hp | Kinder was used by Lehane McKenzie & Shand Ltd in the construction of the Fernilee reservoir in the Peak District of England |
| 10914 | 1924 | | 0-6-0T | 750 mm (2 ft 5 1/2 in) | 90 hp | Sugar Factory Zbiersk 4 |
| 10922 | 1925 | | | 1,067 mm (3 ft 6 in) | | Kaijima class 32 at Nogata Coal Mine Museum |
| 10934 | 1925 | | | 1,435 mm (4 ft 8 1/2 in) | | Ruppiner Eisenbahn, RE 27–32 |
| 10956 | 1925 | | 0-10-0 | 600 mm (1 ft 11 5/8 in) | | SMT T-907, sugar mill Ingenio San Martin del Tabacal in Argentina. Now on a private field near Sheffield, United Kingdom |
| 11007 | 1925 | | 0-6-0 | 600 mm (1 ft 11 5/8 in) | | Py4-741, Sochaczew, Poland |
| 11037 | 1925 | | 0-6-0 | | | Polnische Schmalspurbahnen, Typ 3–191. Pińczówer Kleinbahn (Świętokrzyska Kolej Dojazdowa). |
| 11073 | 1925 | | 0-10-0 | 600 mm (1 ft 11 5/8 in) | 90 hp | Frankfurter Feldbahnmuseum Lok Nr. 1 |
| 11088 | 1925 | | 0-6-0 | 610 mm (2 ft) | 50 hp | Tulsipur Sugar Mill, Indi |
| 10775 | 1924 | | 0-6-0 | 1,067 mm (3 ft 6 in) | 180 hp | Otto Reimers & Co, Tokio, later Kawasakai Seitetsu, NUS 2, Chiba, now preserved at Sodegaura Primary School, Narashino, Japan |
| 11042 | 1925 | | 0-8-0T | 760 mm (2 ft 5 15/16 in) | 90 hp | Czechoslovakia Oberauraer Industrie AG, Bodenbach Klien-Lindner axles, logging railway Zakamenne, since 1952 logging railway Hronec, since 1954 logging railway Zarnovica |
| 11262 | 1926 | | 0-4-4-0; Mallet | 600 mm (1 ft 11 5/8 in) | 60 hp | Semboro 15, Zuckerfabrik PG Semboro, Jember, Java, Indonesia |
| 11139 | 1926 | | 0-8-0 | 600 mm (1 ft 11 5/8 in) | 110 hp | Pagottan 7, PG Pagottan, Madiun, Indonesia |
| 11142 | 1927 | | 0-8-0 | 600 mm (1 ft 11 5/8 in) | 90 hp | Gempolkerep 19, Mojokerto, Indonesia |
| 11171 | 1926 | | 0-6-0 | 600 mm (1 ft 11 5/8 in) | 50 hp | Delivered to Luis y Carlos Carranza, used at Ingenio La Concepción, Veracruz, Mexico |
| 11277 | 1926 | | 0-4-4-0; Mallet | 600 mm (1 ft 11 5/8 in) | 60 hp | Asembagus 17, Asembagus, Situbondo, Indonesia |
| 11293 | 1926 | | 0-6-0 | 1,067 mm (3 ft 6 in) | 225 hp | Semboro 1, Jember, Java, Indonesia |
| 11309 | 1927 | | 0-8-0 | 600 mm (1 ft 11 5/8 in) | 90 hp | Initially Company Azucarera Conception, Argentina. 2008 Preston Services, GB. 2019 to Böhmetalbahn, Walsrode, Germany. |
| 11238 | 1928 | | 0-10-0 | 1,435 mm (4 ft 8 1/2 in) | 600 hp | RAW Grunewald, Luttermöller end axles, Deutsche Reichsbahn 87 008 to be used in Hamburg harbour, later DB, scrapped 9 Nov 1953 |
| 11338 | 1927 | | 2-6-0 | 1,000 mm (3 ft 3 3/8 in) | 150 hp | Kehdinger Kreisbahn, N° 3³, 1936 to Sylter Inselbahn, N° 15, scrapped in 1955 |
| 11348 | 1927 | | 0-8-0 | 600 mm (1 ft 11 5/8 in) | 70 hp | Merican 8, PG Merican, Kediri Indonesia |
| 11350 | 1927 | | 0-6-6-0; Kitson-Meyer | 600 mm (1 ft 11 5/8 in) | | Ferrocarril Militar de Puente Alto al Volcán |
| 11358 | 1927 | | 0-4-0 | 600 mm (1 ft 11 5/8 in) | 50 hp | Hard stone works and steam gravel works Hartsteinwerke Joh. N. Heiß in Stadtsteinach |
| 11365 | 1927 | | 0-4-0 | 600 mm (1 ft 11 5/8 in) | 50 hp | H. Elias & Co, Berlin Lichterfelde: Rudow near Berlin, later brickworks and match factory near Buchhorst and Lauenburg |
| 11368 | 1928 | | 0-4-0 | 600 mm (1 ft 11 5/8 in) | | Lepra-Heilanstalt auf der Isla del Cerrito in Argentina |
| 11420 | 1927 | | 0-6-2 | 700 mm (2 ft 3 9/16 in) | | Sakskøbing Sukkerfabrik N° B2, preserved at Blovstrødbanen, Hillerød, Denmark ex Dansk Jernbane-Klub, Maribo CRJ 111/17 |
| 11550 | 1927 | | 0-8-0 | 600 mm (1 ft 11 5/8 in) | 90 hp | Kebonagung 5, PG Kebonagung, Malang, Indonesia |
| 11563 | 1928 | | 0-8-0 | 600 mm (1 ft 11 5/8 in) | 110 hp | Rejosari 11 Gedek, PG Rejosari, Madiun, Indonesia |
| 11584 | 1927 | | 0-8-0 | 700 mm (2 ft 3 9/16 in) | 125 hp | Ingenio Ledesma, Argentina |
| 11695 | 1928 | | 0-8-0 | 600 mm (1 ft 11 5/8 in) | 25 hp | Farmor ('Grandmother'), Domänverket Böda locomotive 1 'Mormor' in Böda Kronopark, Böda forest railway, Sweden |
| 11603 | 1928 | | 0-8-0 | 600 mm (1 ft 11 5/8 in) | 60 hp | Sindanglaut 12, Zuckerfabrik PG Sindanglaut 12, Cirebon, Java, Indonesia |
| 11638 | 1928 | | 0-8-0 | 600 mm (1 ft 11 5/8 in) | 150 hp | Gempolkerep 4, Mojokerto, Indonesia |
| 11648 | 1928 | | 0-4-0 | 700 mm | | Veenpark, Barger-Compascuum (Gemeinde Emmen), Netherlands |
| 11684 | | | 0-4-0 | 600 mm (1 ft 11 5/8 in) | | Stoomtrein Katwijk Leiden |
| 11689 | 1928 | | 0-6-2 | 762 mm (2 ft 6 in) | 70 hp | Meiji Seito KK, Japan, later Seibu Park Railway and Restaurant Pupu, Seibuen, Japan. Since 2011 in a museum of the Chen Zhonghe Charity Foundation in Kaohsiung, Taiwan. |
| 11700 | 1928 | | 2-6-0 | 1,000 mm (3 ft 3 3/8 in) | 150 hp | Kehdinger Kreisbahn, N° 7, in 1936 to Greifenberger Kleinbahn (GbKB) as N° 24, in 1940 to Pommersche Landesbahnen (PLB) as N° 137N3406 (Greifenberger Kleinbahn, GbKB), in 1945 to PKP as N° Txa-3323, re-numbered on 25 June 1961 to PKP N° Tya7-3344, scrapped on 8 April 1971 |
| 11735 | 1928 | | Bn2t | 600 mm (1 ft 11 5/8 in) | 50 hp | Initially Steenfabriek IJsseloord near Arnhem, now Stoomloc 6 at Stoomtrein Katwijk Leiden Netherlands |
| 11784 | 1927 | | 0-6-0 | 600 mm (1 ft 11 5/8 in) | | Caminho de Ferro Mineiro do Pejão, São Domingos, Portugal |
| 11788 | 1929 | | 0-8-0 | 600 mm (1 ft 11 5/8 in) | | Phosphate railway near the village of Vaitepaua in the north of the island Makatea |
| 11868 | 1929 | | 0-4-0 | 700 mm (2 ft 3 9/16 in) | 50 hp | Spoorijzer 30, Netherlands |
| 11916–11923 | 1929 | | B n2t | 600 mm (1 ft 11 5/8 in) | 30 hp | Société Générale des Colonies, Paris for Indochina, coal fired |
| 11927 | 1928 | | C fl | 600 mm (1 ft 11 5/8 in) | | Semboro 3, Jember, Java, Indonesia |
| 11198 | 1926 | | 0-6-0 | 1,000 mm (3 ft 3 3/8 in) | | Tren de Arganda bei Madrid |
| 11695 | 1928 | | 0-6-0 | 1,000 mm (3 ft 3 3/8 in) | | Le Petit Train de la Baie de Saint-Brieuc, Association des chemins de fer des Côtes-du-Nord |
| 11591 | 1928 | | 0-4-0 | 600 mm (1 ft 11 5/8 in) | | Stoomtrein Katwijk Leiden |
| | ca 1928 | | 2-6-0 | 1,000 mm (3 ft 3 3/8 in) | | 22 t, Saigon–Mỹ Tho railway, Vietnam |
| 11882 | 1929 | | 0-4-0 | 600 mm | 30 hp | Consorzio bonifica Pò di Revere, attualmente in restauro a Castel del Rio (BO) Italy |
| 11990 | 1929 | | 0-6-0 fl | 750 mm | | Fireless locomotive, Äänekoski–Suolahti railway, Minkiö narrow gauge railway museum |
| 12063 | 1929 | | 0-8-0 | 760 mm (2 ft 5 15/16 in) | 110 hp | Latorica of Latorica AG, Czechoslovakia, heated by wood |
| 12183 | 1930 | | 0-6-0 | 914 mm | 50 hp | Sir William, ex sucrerie de Beauchamp, Musee L'Aventure du Sucre in Pamplemousse, Mauritius (or Deep River Sugar Estate, 750 mm) |
| 12185 | 1930 | | 0-8-0 | 600 mm | 110 hp | Azucarera de Madrid GÖA, preserved at Ind. Lopez Soriano, Zaragoza, Spain |
| 12203 | 1933 | | 0-4-0 | 600 mm (1 ft 11 5/8 in) | 50 hp | Tulangan 5 Mojopahit, scrap heap at CV Tersana Baru, Kediri, Indonesia |
| 12214 | 1930 | | 0-6-0 | 600 mm (1 ft 11 5/8 in) | 50 hp | N° 14. Delivered to Soforbel in Brussels for Zingal, Turkey |
| 12234 | 1931 | | 0-4-0 | 750 mm (2 ft 5 1/2 in) | 50 hp | Eight-wheel coupled locomotive, type D, 150 hp, for wood fuel with separate 4-axle bogie tender, delivered to A.O. Meyer, Hamburg for Siam, Klien-Lindner hollow axles, sugar factory Lampang N° 9 |
| 12237 | 1930 | | 2-8-0 | 914 mm (3 ft) | 500 hp | Delivered to Ingenio Cooperativa El Mante, Tamaulipas, Mexico, with 4-axle bogie tender, resold in the 1950s to the Cuatotolapan Ciasa Mill, in Veracruz |
| 12246 | 1933 | | 0-4-0 | 600 mm (1 ft 11 5/8 in) | 50 hp | Yvonne, initially Steenfabriek Rijswijk Netherlands, later Eerste Drentse Vereniging van Stoomliefhebber EDS, Museum Veenpark |
| 12247 | 1911 | | 0-4-0 | 700 mm | 50 hp | Sawit Seberang 6 (previously 7), Sumatra, Indonesia |
| | 1930–1932 | | 0-4-0 | 750 mm (2 ft 5 1/2 in) | | O&K 0-8-0 Klien-Lindner narrow gauge locomotive No 22 on a French post card with handwritten note "Roblès Meu". Probably one of a batch of O&K locos built for contractors Léon Chagnaud & Fils for the Bou Hanifia dam in Algeria. O&K built 20 of these locos, 750mm gauge, in 1930–32 for the Bou Hanifia dam construction, of which seven or more ended up with Brazilian sugar mills (probably in payment of French war debts to Brazil). Frei Caneca had two, O&K 12259 and 12337, both of which survived. No. 6 is at Usina Alta Paulista in Junqueiropolis SP, No. 5 is at an engineering firm in Catende PE. No. 32 from the dam construction looks identical. |
| | | | 0-4-0 | 1,435 mm (4 ft 8 1/2 in) | | Fireless locomotive, Semtín |
| | | | 0-4-0 | 600 mm (1 ft 11 5/8 in) | | Bánhida (now part of Tatabánya része) - Tolna (now Vértestolna) narrow gauge railway in Hungary |
| 12262 | 1931 | | 0-4-0 | 600 mm (1 ft 11 5/8 in) | | Rendeng 08, PG Gondang Baru, Klaten, Indonesia |
| 12331 | 1931 | | 0-6-0 | 760 mm (2 ft 5 15/16 in) | | Sub Nigel Gold Mines No. 3 in Dunnattar, Transvaal, South Africa |
| 12347 | 1931 | | 0-8-0 | 750 mm (2 ft 5 1/2 in) | 750 hp | Mansfeld AG, Bergbau- u Hüttenbetrieb, Eisleben preserved at Mansfeld Museum, Hettstedt, Germany as N° 8^{II} IRB 583/27 |
| 12348 | 1931 | | 0-8-0 | 750 mm (2 ft 5 1/2 in) | 750 hp | Mansfeld AG, Bergbau- u Hüttenbetrieb, Eisleben preserved at Mansfelder Bergwerksbahn eV, Mansfeld, Germany as N° 7^{II} IRB 583/28, also known as 99 4011 |
| 12349 | 1931 | | 0-8-0 | 750 mm (2 ft 5 1/2 in) | 750 hp | Mansfeld AG, Bergbau- u Hüttenbetrieb, Eisleben |
| 12350 | 1931 | | 0-8-0 | 750 mm (2 ft 5 1/2 in) | 750 hp | Mansfeld AG, Bergbau- u Hüttenbetrieb, Eisleben, initially preserved at Mansfelder Bergwerksbahn eV, Mansfeld, Germany as N° 9^{II} IRB 583/28, now Yekaterinburg children railway |
| 12375 | 1932 | | 0-8-0 | 600 mm (1 ft 11 5/8 in) | 90 hp | Pangka 10, PG Pangka, Slawi bei Tegal |
| 12388 | 1932 | | 0-6-0 | Initially 762 mm (2 ft 6 in); later 600 mm (1 ft 11 5/8 in) | | Initially Beau Sejour Estate, Mauritius, now L'Aventure du Sucre, Beau Plan, near Pamplemousses, Mauritius |
| 12400 | 1932 | | 2-8-2 | 900 mm (2 ft 11 7/16 in) | | DR 99 2321–0, Bäderbahn Molli, Germany |
| 12401 | 1932 | | 2-8-2 | 900 mm | | DR 99 2322–8, Bäderbahn Molli, Germany |
| 12402 | 1932 | | 2-8-2 | 900 mm | | DR 99 2323–6, Bäderbahn Molli, Germany |
| 12435 | 1933 | | 0-4-0 | 600 mm (1 ft 11 5/8 in) | 50 hp | Tulangan 2 Sriwijaya, Kediri, scrap metal merchant CV Tersana Baru, ex PG Tulangan, Sidoarjo Indonesia |
| 12473 | 1934 | | 0-4-0T+WT | 1,600 mm (5 ft 3 in) | | Orenstein & Koppel CSÉT Shunting Locomotives |
| 12662 | 1935 | | 0-4-0T+WT | 1,600 mm (5 ft 3 in) | | Orenstein & Koppel CSÉT Shunting Locomotives |
| 12493 | 1934 | | 0-6-0 | 500 mm | 30 hp | Initially sugar factory Companhia de Assúcar de Angola, Fazenda Tentativa, Caxito, Angola, Nº 7, now Feldbahn-Museum 500, Nuremberg, |
| 12503 | 1934 | | Initially 0–4–0, later 2-4-0 | 600 mm (1 ft 11 5/8 in) | | Peter Büscher & Sohn, construction company, Münster, now No 43 heritage railway at Silver Dollar City, Missouri, United States |
| 12513 | 1935 | | 0-6-2 | 600 mm (1 ft 11 5/8 in) | 135 hp | Estudios y Obras del Riachuelo, Buenos Aires, Argentina |
| 12518 | 1934 | | 0-8-0T+T (D h2t+t) | 600 mm (1 ft 11 5/8 in) | 180 hp | N° 12^{II} of Mecklenburg-Pommersche Schmalspurbahn (MPSB), Dampf-Kleinbahn Mühlenstroth, No. 12, Mecklenburg |
| 12536 | 1934 | | 0-4-0WT | | | Companhia de Assúcar de Angola, Fazenda Tentativa, Caxito, Angola, Nº 8 |
| 12540-12559 | 1934–1935 | | 2-6-0 | 1,000 mm (3 ft 3 3/8 in) | | Tatungen-Puchow Railway, China, with 3-axle tenders, weight in working order 28.3 t plus 21.5 t |
| 12595 | 1935 | | 0-4-0 | 600 mm (1 ft 11 5/8 in) | | T1-009, Narrow Gauge Railway Museum in Wenecja, Poland |
| 12643 | 1935 | | | 600 mm (1 ft 11 5/8 in) | | Lundebanen |
| 12701 | 1936 | | 0-4-0 | 600 mm (1 ft 11 5/8 in) | 50 hp | Delivered to G. Maar, Kaiserslautern, later construction company Tiefbaugesellschaft Oltsch & Cie, Zweibrücken N° 34 |
| 12708 | 1936 | | 0-6-0 | 610 mm (2 ft) | | Buckeye used in Africa, in the 1980s on Gwelo & District Light Railway in Zimbabwe and finally on Peter Nott's Norgrove Gardens Railway in California |
| 12722 | 1936 | | | | | Bredgar and Wormshill Light Railway |
| 12738 | 1936 | | 0-8-0 | 750 mm (2 ft 5 1/2 in) | 750 hp | Mansfeld AG Berg-u Hüttenbetrieb, Eisleben now Kombinat W. Piek Mansfeld BNr.10, preserved at Mansfelder Bergwerksbahn eV, Mansfeld, Germany as N° 10^{II} IRB 583/28 |
| 12740 | 1936 | | | 610 mm (2 ft) | | In use until 1971 at Likomba Development Company, Cameroon, Africa, wood-fired, with a spark arrestor, now Elf, Leighton Buzzard Light Railway switched to coal |
| 12782 | 1936 | | 0-6-0 | 750 mm (2 ft 5 1/2 in) | | Initially Åminnefors Railway, Pohja, later Jokioinen Railway, Finland |
| 12788 | ca. 1936 | | 0-4-0 | 900 mm (2 ft 11 7/16 in) | | J.P. Broekhoven, Nijmegen, Operator N° 50 preserved at Neve, Vreeswijk later SVM Valkenburg, preserved at NSS, Valkenburg, Netherlands (Foto) |
| 12861 | 1936 | | 0-4-0 | | | Trelew in Chubut, Argentina |
| 12791 | 1936 | | 0-6-0 | 800 mm | | Medine Estate, now Casela Bird Park, Cascavelle, Mauritius |
| 12805 | 1936 | | 0-4-0 | 600 mm (1 ft 11 5/8 in) | | Dampfkleinbahn-Mühlenstroth, Gütersloh, Germany |
| 12814 | 1936 | | 2-6-0 | 600 mm (1 ft 11 5/8 in) | 40 hp | Gunung Malayu 01, Gunung Malayu, PT Lonsum Sumatra, Indonesia Joaquín Salabert's archive. |
| 12854 | 1936 | | 0-6-0 | 600 mm (1 ft 11 5/8 in) | 70 hp | Cia Manufacturera de Cemento SA La Cruz, Cruz Azul, Hidalgo Province, Mexico, preserved at soccer stadium of Cruz Azul Cement Works, Hidalgo, Mexico. |
| 12900 | 1937 | | 0-4-0 | 600 mm (1 ft 11 5/8 in) | | Initially Bungenäs, since 1951 Smöjens Kalkbrott 5 since 1964 in a museum in Gotland |
| 12941 | 1937 | | | | | Berlin-Drewitz |
| 12952 | 1937 | | 2-10-0 | | | Tóngpú Railway Decapod steam locomotive N° 324 |
| 12956 | 1937 | | | 1,676 mm (5 ft 6 in) | | Now in Ferroclub Argentino, Rem. De Escalada Works, Argentina |
| 12974 | 1937 | | | 600 mm (1 ft 11 5/8 in) | | Stoomtrein Katwijk Leiden |
| 13088 | 1937 | | 0-4-0T | 891 mm (2 ft 11 3/32 in) (Swedish 3 ft gauge) | 50 hp | Kullgrens Enka AB, Uddevalla, Sweden, initially preserved at Museum Uddevalla, now preserved at Hjo harbour, Sweden |
| 13021 | 1937 | | 0-6-0 | 920mm | 160 hp | SA Belge des Mines d'Aljustrel, Aljustrel, Portugal |
| 13101 | 1938 | | 0-10-0 | 600 mm (1 ft 11 5/8 in) | | T911, sugar mill San Martin del Tabacal in Salta, Argentina |
| 13103 | 1938 | | 0-4-0 | 750 mm (2 ft 5 1/2 in) | 110 hp | Quarz-Susi, Quarzwerke, Frechen, Bachem/Frechen, now Rheinisches Industriebahn-Museum, Cologne, Germany |
| 13118 | 1938 | | 0-8-0 | 600 mm (1 ft 11 5/8 in) | 90 hp | Jatibarang 12, PG Jatibarang, Tegal, Indonesia |
| 13165 | 1938 | | 0-4-0 | 600 mm (1 ft 11 5/8 in) | 70 hp | Deinste 9, Dossenheim quarries, Porphywerk Altvatter & Co, Dossenheim, later Witten-Bommern, Zeche Nachtigall coal mine |
| 13168 | 1939 | | Initially 0–4–0, later 2-4-0 | 600 mm (1 ft 11 5/8 in) | 70 hp | A31034/1, Müller-Altvater Co. construction company, Stuttgart, later Northfield & Cannon Valley Railroad in Northfield, Minnesota, now No. 13 , heritage railway at Silver Dollar City, Missouri, United States |
| 13169 | 1939 | | 0-4-0 | 600 mm (1 ft 11 5/8 in) | 70 hp | A31034/2, Müller-Altvater Co. construction company, Stuttgart, later Northfield & Cannon Valley Railroad in Northfield, Minnesota, now No. 14, heritage railway at Silver Dollar City, Missouri, United States |
| 13177 | 1939 | | | | | |
| 13200 | 1938 | | | 1,435 mm (4 ft 8 1/2 in) | | Deutsche Reichsbahn N° 99 3361, ex Mecklenburg-Pommersche Schmalspurbahn N° 14^{II} |
| 13216 | 1940 | | 0-8-0 | 750 mm (2 ft 5 1/2 in) | 750 hp | Mansfeld'scher Kupferschiefer Bergbau AG, Eisleben preserved at Mansfelder Bergwerksbahn eV, Mansfeld, Germany as N° 11^{II} IRB 583/28 |
| | | | 0-4-0 | 600 mm (1 ft 11 5/8 in) | | HK 27, probably owned by Hermann/Hugo Klammt AG. Another photo shows a different O&K locomotive with an attributed works number of 7259, HK 4. Hermann Klammt had about 4 steam locomotives seized from their Königsberg premises in August 1941, but no numbers were given, to identify them. |
| 13239 | 1939 | | 0-4-0 | 600 mm (1 ft 11 5/8 in) | 60 hp | The photo shows probably HF 6011, which was used on an unspecified field railway in the central section of the Eastern Front in 1942/43. It is a 60 hp 0-4-0T. The relevant literature shows a number of pictures of the engine pushing a two-axle light railway wagon of Type 1a in front of it, which was apparently converted into a water wagon. The arrangement in front of the locomotive probably also served as a mine protection wagon. |
| 13306 to 13308 | 1939 | | 0-6-6-0, C'C' h4t, Kitson Meyer | 600 mm (1 ft 11 5/8 in) | 310 PSI, 250 PSE | DR 99 1641 to DR 99 1643, later PKP Tyyl-691 to Tyyl-693 |
| 13513 | 1943 | | 2-8-2 | 1,435 mm (4 ft 8 1/2 in) | | Ruppiner Eisenbahn, RE 42, later DR 93 6481 |
| 13571 | 1941 | | 0-4-0 | 900 mm (2 ft 11 7/16 in) | 110 hp | Dollart (Borkum^{III}), Borkumer Kleinbahn |
| 13573 | 1942 | | 0-6-0 | 762 mm (2 ft 6 in) | 70 hp | Salzkammergut-Lokalbahn |
| 13574 | 1942 | | 0-6-0 | 762 mm (2 ft 6 in) | 70 hp | Salzkammergut-Lokalbahn |

== Literature ==
- Roland Bude, Klaus Fricke and Martin Murray: O&K-Dampflokomotiven : Lieferverzeichnis 1892–1945. Verlag Railroadiana, Buschhoven 1978, ISBN 3-921894-00-X. (Partial reprint of an Orenstein & Koppel publication)
- Delivery lists of the locomotive works at werkbahn.de (nominal charge)
