= Likstammen =

Lake in Nyköping Municipality, Sweden

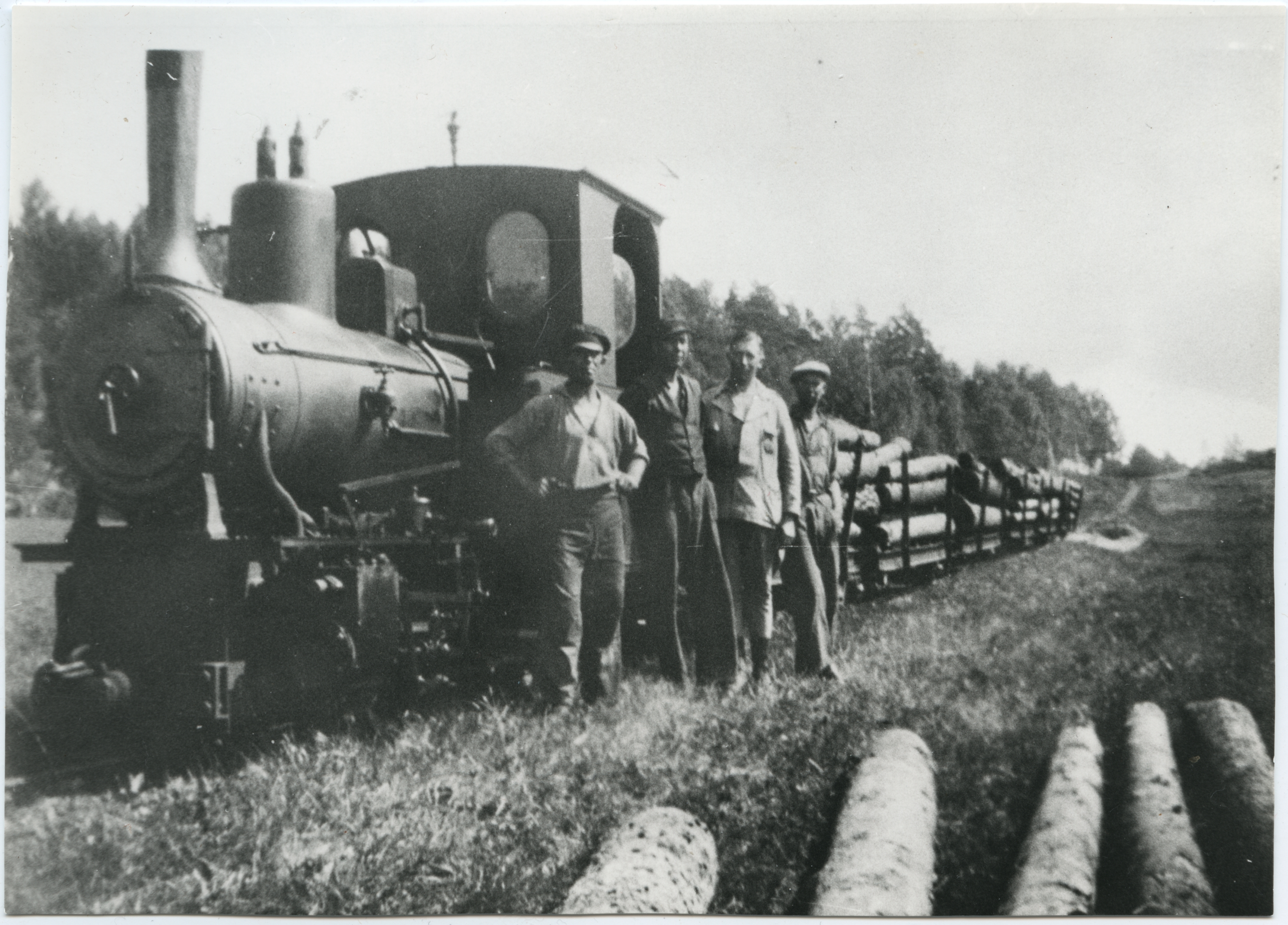
- The O&K locomotive 'Putte' operated from 1914 to 1934 between Likstammen and Båven, (Axalabanan)

- Location within Södermanland Location within Sweden
- Coordinates: 58°58′N 17°12′E
- Basin countries: Sweden

Likstammen is a lake in Södermanland, Sweden.
