= Abainville =

- Commune
- Coat of arms
- Location of Abainville
- Location within France Location within Grand Est
- Coordinates: 48°31′56″N 5°29′43″E
- Country: France
- Region: Grand Est
- Department: Meuse
- Arrondissement: Commercy
- Canton: Ligny-en-Barrois
- Intercommunality: Portes de Meuse

Government
  - Mayor (2020–2026): Jean-Claude Herpierre
- Area^{1}: 13.67 km^{2} (5.28 sq mi)
- Highest elevation: 388 m (1,273 ft)
- Lowest elevation: 282 m (925 ft)
- Population (2023): 280
  - Density: 20/km^{2} (53/sq mi)
- Demonym(s): Abainvillois, Abainvilloises
- Time zone: UTC+01:00 (CET)
  - Summer (DST): UTC+02:00 (CEST)
- INSEE/Postal code: 55001 /55130
- ^{1} French Land Register data, which excludes lakes, ponds, glaciers > 1 km^{2} (0.386 sq mi or 247 acres) and river estuaries.

Abainville (French pronunciation: [abɛ̃vil]) is a commune in the Meuse department in the Grand Est region in northeastern France.

== Population ==
Historical population

Year	Pop.	±% p.a.
1793	290	—
1800	321	+1.46%
1806	334	+0.66%
1821	314	−0.41%
1831	514	+5.05%
1836	519	+0.19%
1841	572	+1.96%
1846	675	+3.37%
1851	783	+3.01%
1856	664	−3.24%
1861	687	+0.68%
1866	776	+2.47%
1872	770	−0.13%
1876	735	−1.16%
1881	725	−0.27%
1886	718	−0.19%
1891	668	−1.43%
1896	598	−2.19%
1901	612	+0.46%

Year	Pop.	±% p.a.
1906	272	−14.97%
1911	493	+12.63%
1921	523	+0.59%
1926	443	−3.27%
1931	384	−2.82%
1936	377	−0.37%
1946	364	−0.35%
1954	322	−1.52%
1962	349	+1.01%
1968	369	+0.93%
1975	327	−1.71%
1982	349	+0.93%
1990	305	−1.67%
1999	318	+0.46%
1999	318	+0.00%
2007	333	+0.58%
2012	293	−2.53%
2017	301	+0.54%
2023	280	−1.20%

Source: EHESS and INSEE

== See also ==
- Communes of the Meuse department
