= Csömödér =

- Village
- Flag Coat of arms

- Location of Csömödér
- Coordinates: 46.609°N 16.6393°E
- Country: Hungary
- Region: Western Transdanubia
- County: Zala
- District: Lenti

Area
  - Total: 7.79 km^{2} (3.01 sq mi)

Population (1 January 2025)
  - Total: 572
  - Density: 73.4/km^{2} (190/sq mi)
- Time zone: UTC+1 (CET)
  - Summer (DST): UTC+2 (CEST)
- Postal code: 8957
- Area code: (+36) 92
- Website: csomoder.hu

Csömödér is a village in Zala County, Hungary.
