= List of Decauville railways =

The following is a list of Decauville railways.

- Decauville railway at Exposition Universelle (1889)
- Decauville railway Tianjin – Jinnan
- Decauville Railway of the Cobazet Estate
- Decauville railway Vigía Chico-Santa Cruz
- Decauville railway of the Watissart quarries
- Decauville Railway of the Bancalari Mill
- Decauville railway at Diégo Suarez
- Soignes Forest Railway
- Sousse–Kairouan Decauville railway
- Decauville railway Narès–Inglis–Topçin–Vatiluk
- Naphtha Hill Decauville Railway
- Kodza Déré Decauville Railway
- Decauville Tramway at Exposition Universelle in Gent, 1913
- Bathurst Decauville Tramway
- Beverloo Camp Railway
- Benjamin Constant railway
- Rufisque tramway
- Ocampo Railway
- Tramway of Quend-Plage and Fort-Mahon
- Rainforest Ecological Train
- Elsenborn Camp Railway
- Société Coloniale des Chaux et Ciments de Portland de Marseille
- Tehran–Rey Railway
- Vittorio di Africa
- Decauville railway at Láchar
- Narrow-gauge railways in Luxembourg
- Euville light railways
- Narrow-gauge railways in the Netherlands
- Réau
- Spalding railway
- Italian colonial railways
- Tramway at Darvault
- Chemins de fer du Calvados
- Eiffel Bridge, Láchar
- Tramway de Pithiviers à Toury
- Sakaramy
- Durrës-Vlorë railway
- Greek industrial railways
- Narrow-gauge railways in former French Morocco
- Palamutluk–Balya–Mancılık railway
- Diakopto–Kalavryta railway
- Donon Light Railway
- Bandraboua
- Vittorio di Africa
- Southern Fuegian Railway
- Narrow-gauge railways of France
- Eritrean Railway
- Mogadishu–Villabruzzi Railway
- Saint-Élie
- Chemin de Fer Touristique du Tarn
- Jardin d'Acclimatation railway
- Sian Kaʼan Biosphere Reserve
- Haute-Soule forest railway
- British military narrow-gauge railways
- Yerba Buena Steam Tram
- Mindanao historical railways
- Gebishi railway
- Italian Somali Divisions (101 and 102)
- Chemin de fer du Val de Passey
- Muséotrain
- Chambéry tramway
- Jaffa–Jerusalem railway
