= Soignes Forest Railway =

Railway line in Belgium

Overview
- Native name: Chemin de fer de la forêt de Soignes
- Status: Closed and disappeared

Service
- Type: Decauville

History
- Opened: 1902
- Closed: 1918

Technical
- Line length: 2.5 km (1.6 mi)
- Number of tracks: 1
- Track gauge: 600 mm (1 ft 11 5/8 in)
- Electrification: No

The Soignes Forest Railway was a Belgian type Decauville railway, which has disappeared since its closing in 1918.

== History ==
Put into service in 1902, this railway linked the Petite-Espinette in the Brussels municipality of Uccle (at the limit of Rhode-Saint-Genèse), then served by the old line to Waterloo of the Brussels tram, to Boitsfort railway station, on the Brussels–Namur–Luxembourg railway line. Established in the Sonian Forest, the line was 2.5 kilometres (1.6 mi) long.

After the First World War, it was abandoned for reasons of unprofitability. This railway line transported gravelling materials for the laying of forest paths, and was also used to transport wood.

== Location ==
Starting from the beginning of the Drève Saint-Hubert, the railway crossed the Drève de Lorraine and then ran along a large part of the Drève des Deux Montagnes.

== Gallery ==
=== The railway ===
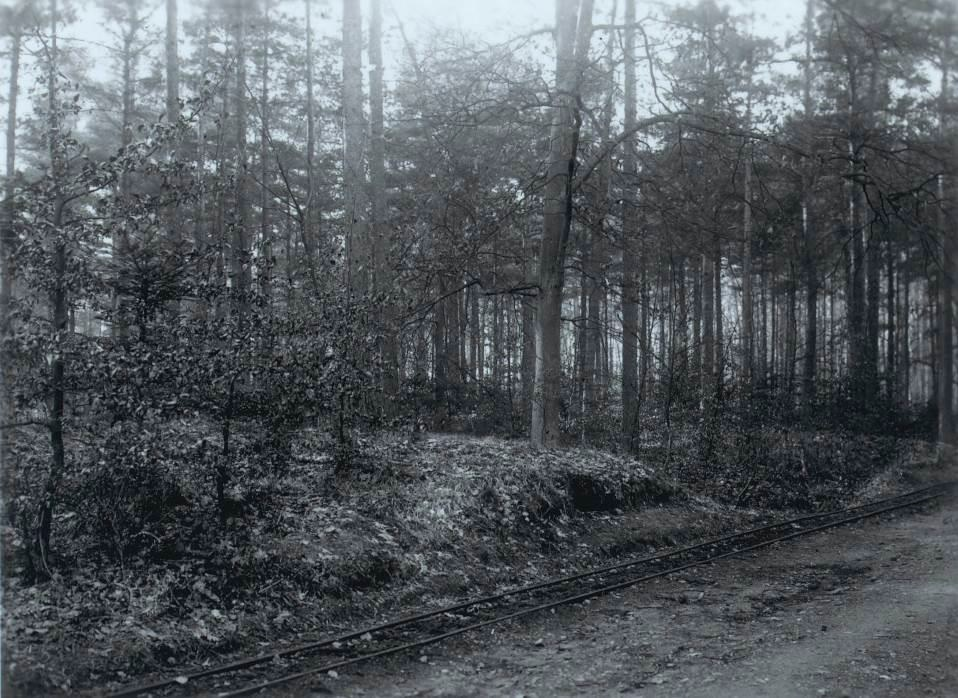
The railway before 1920 (Chemin des Deux Montagnes)

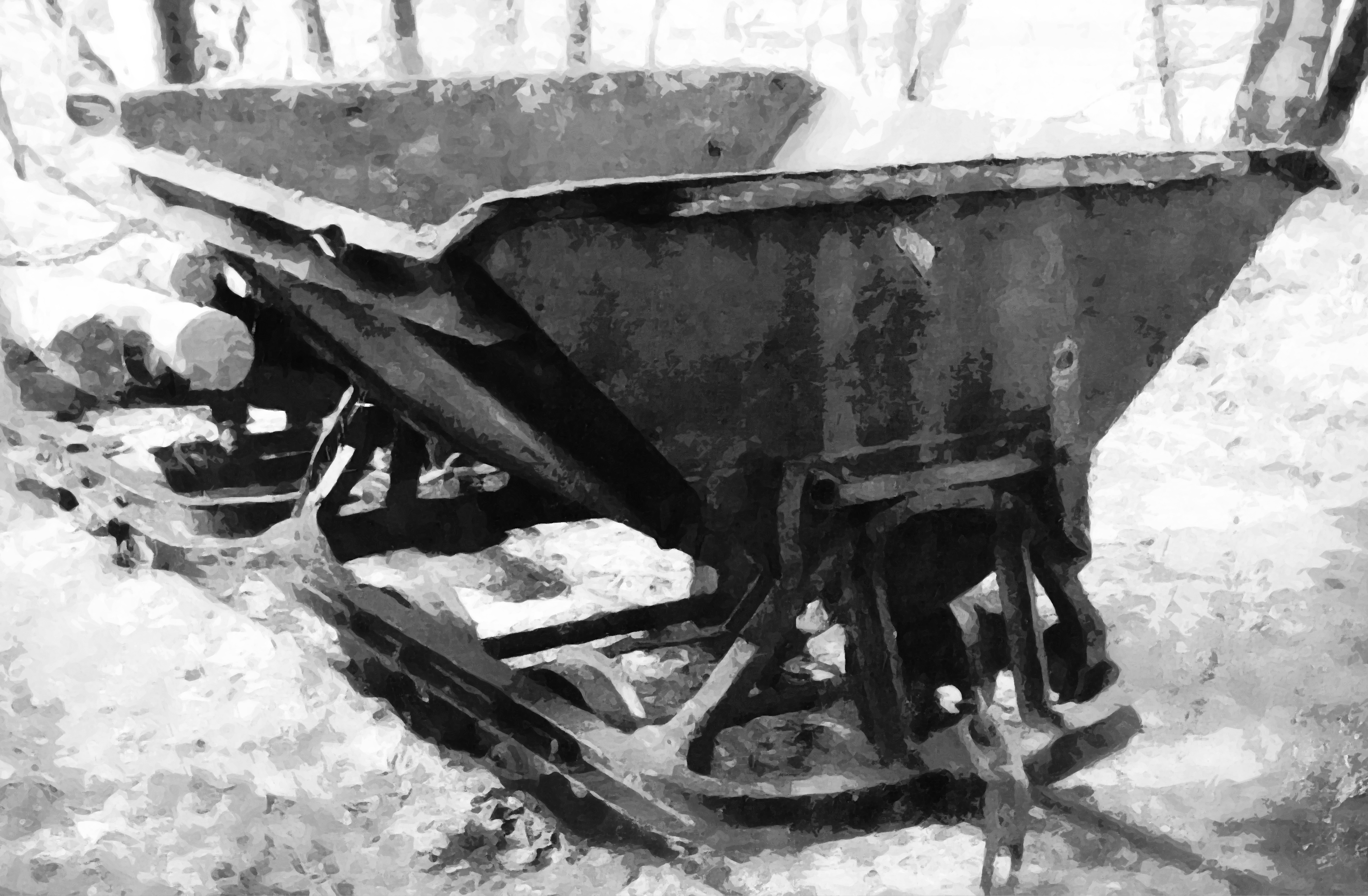
Decauville wagon or open wagon used at the time

=== The shed ===
The shed, built in 1902 like the line, was renovated in 2003. Having served as a shed for the rolling stock, it is the only remnant of the old railway. In the 2010s, this building served as a storage facility and shelter for foresters.

The shed in 2017

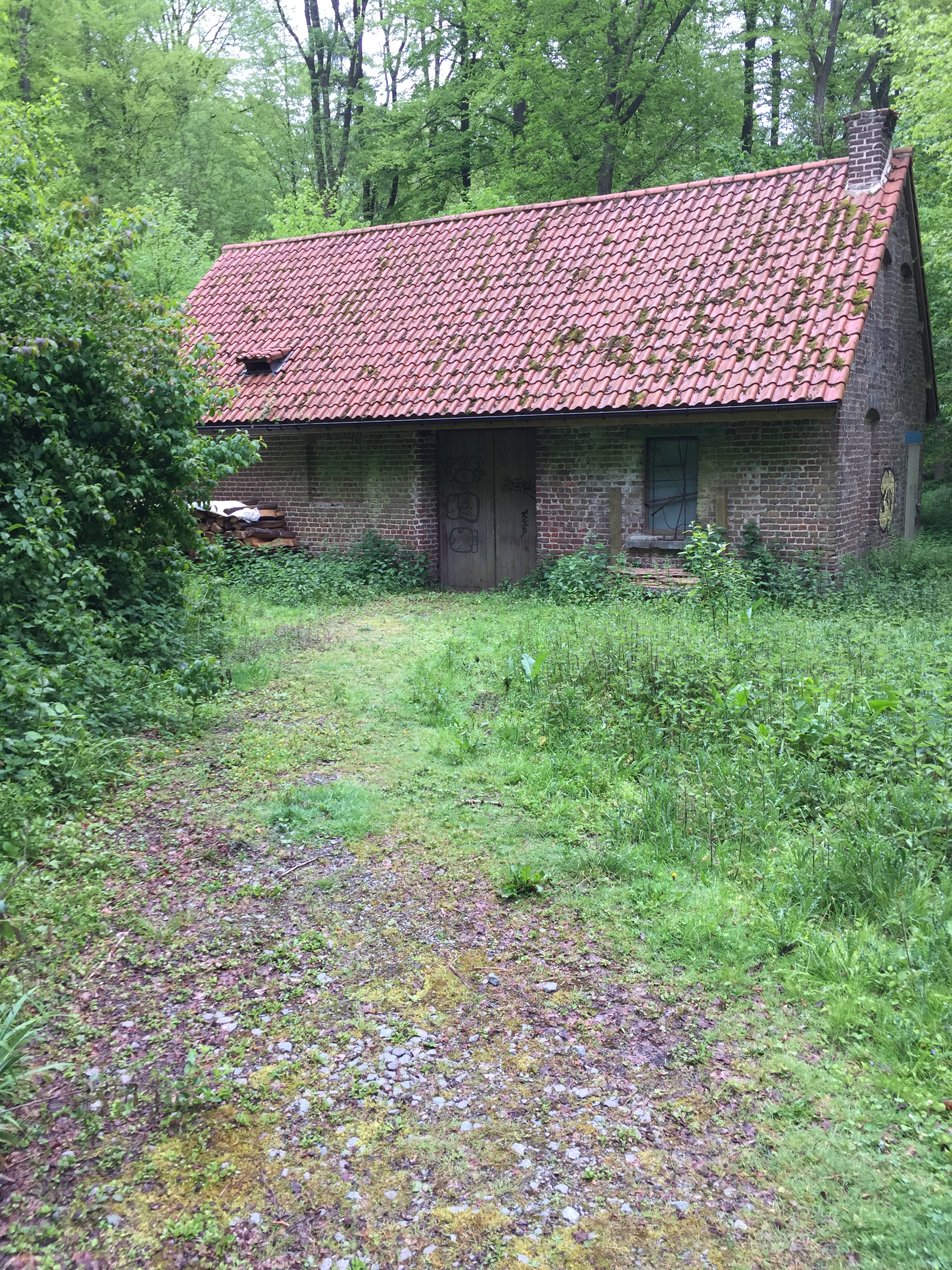
Shed in the Sonian Forest

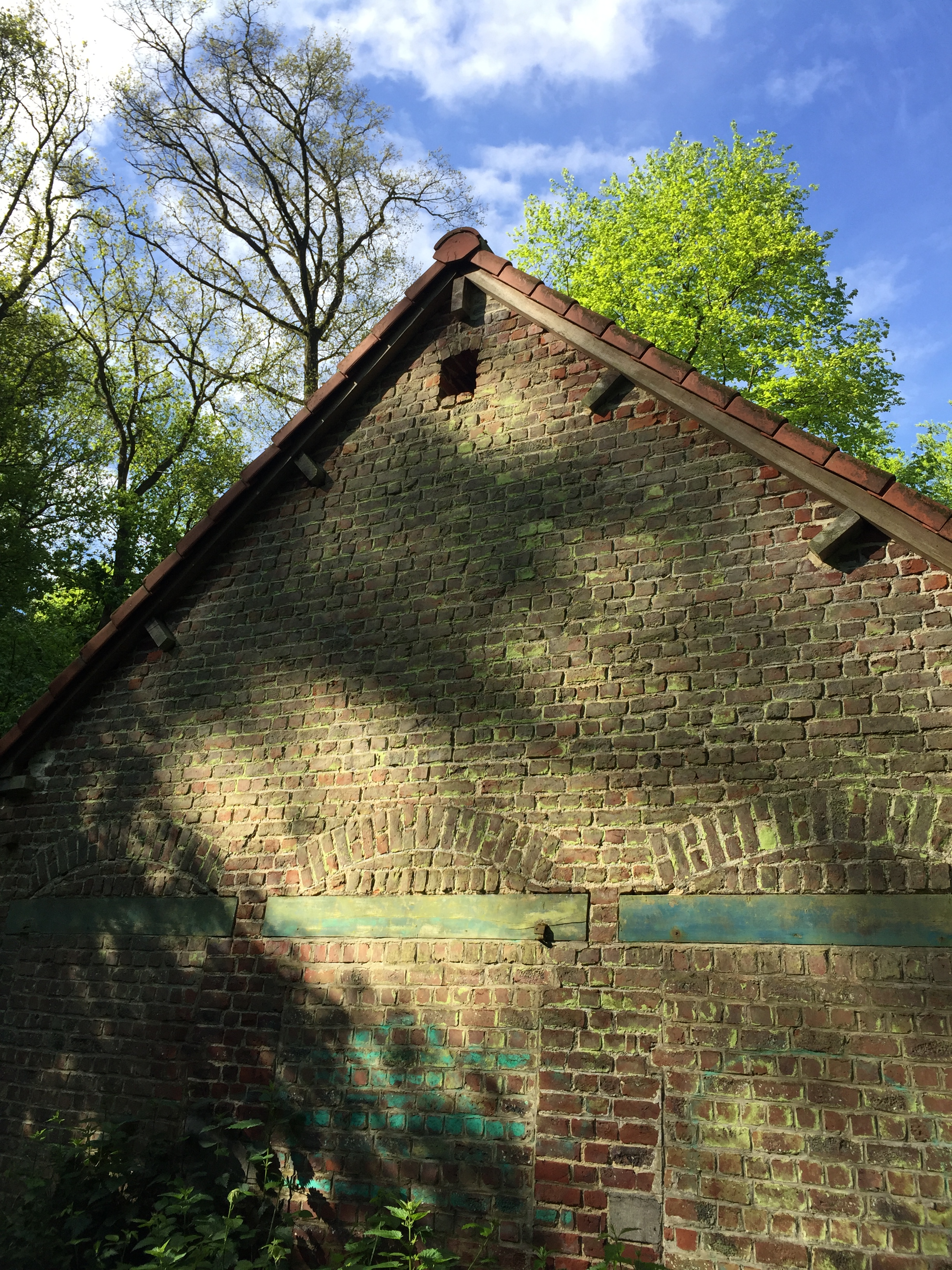
Traces of the three old rolling stock access gates

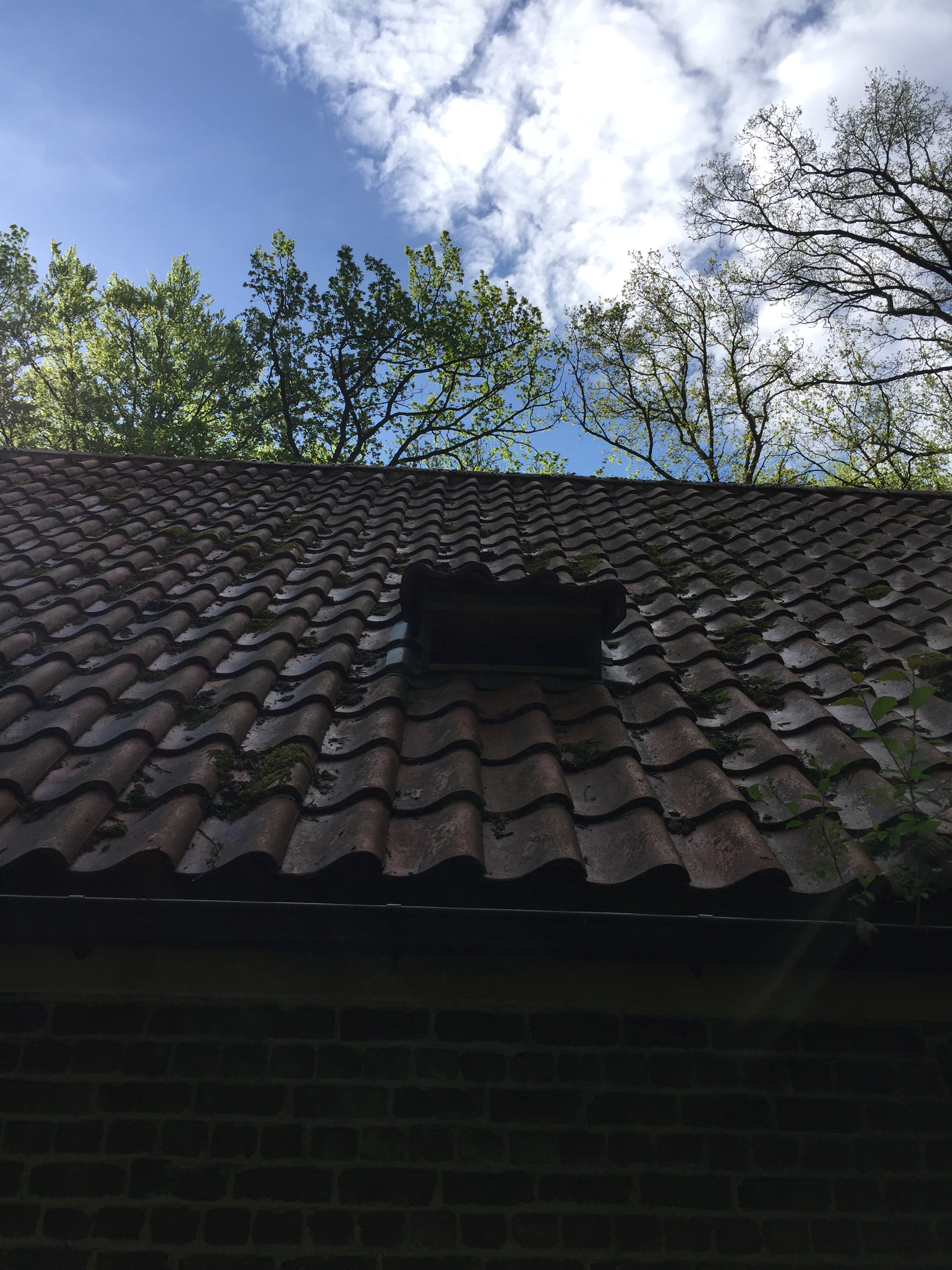
Entrance for bats, fitted into the roof

== See also ==
- Drève des Deux Montagnes^{(fr)}
- Drève Saint-Hubert^{(fr)}
- Drève de Lorraine^{(fr)}
- Forest railway
- List of Decauville railways
- Narrow gauge railway
- Soignes Forest

== Literature ==
- Stéphane Vanwijnsberghe und Jean-Christophe Prignon: Beheerplan voor het Brussels gedeelte van het Zoniënwoud. Boek III. Beheerplannen voor de archeologische sites, natuurreservaten en bosreservaten.
- Stéphane Vanwijnsberghe und Jean-Christophe Prignon: Plan de gestion de la Forêt de Soignes bruxelloise. Livre III. Plans de gestion des réserves archéologiques, naturelles et forestières.
- Bart Vanmontfort, Els Meirsman und Roger Langohr: Archeologische evaluatie van de neolothische site (Bosvoorde-Vijvers) Twee Bergenlaan in Watermaal-Bosvoorde.
