= Decauville railway Tianjin – Jinnan =

Railway line in China

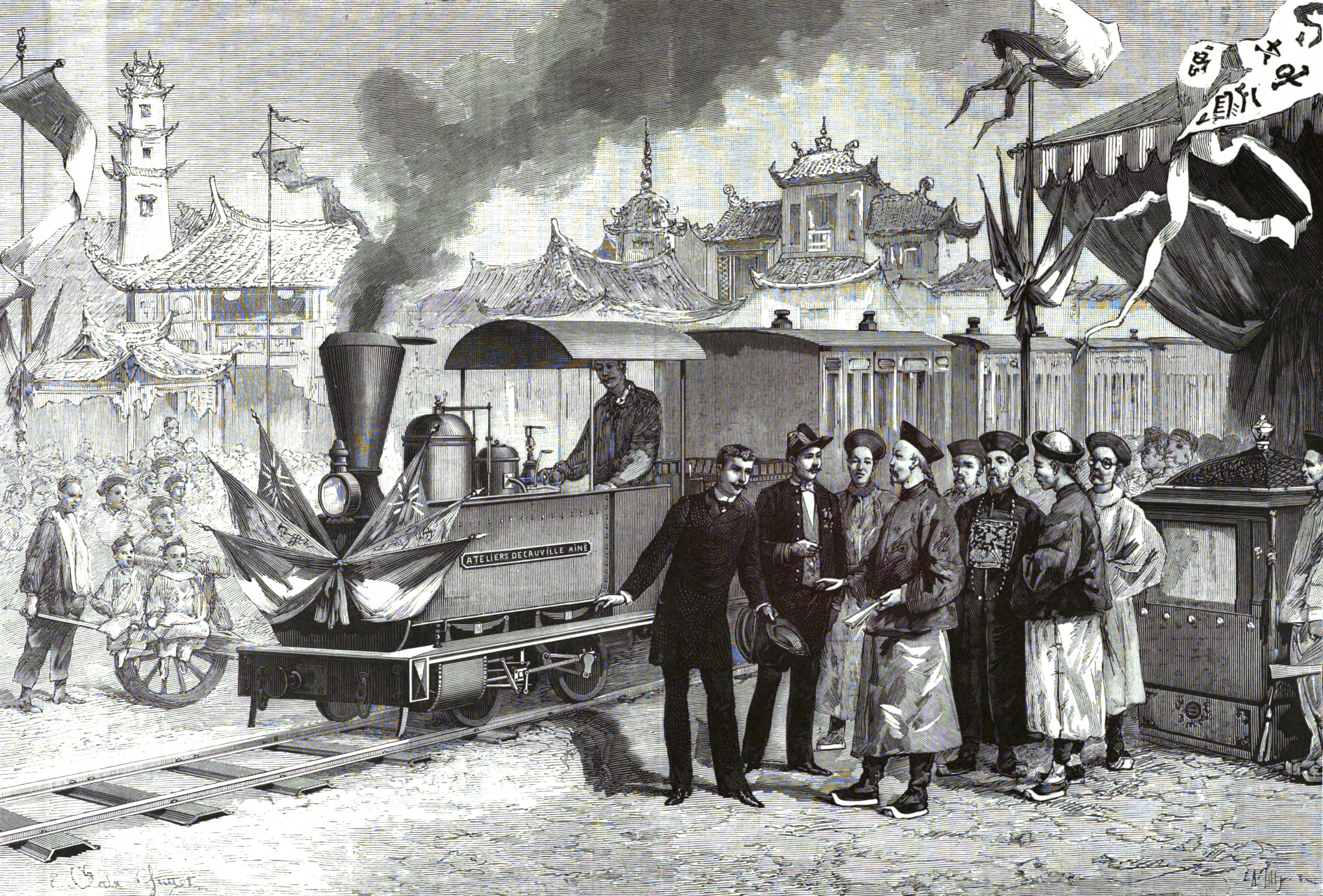
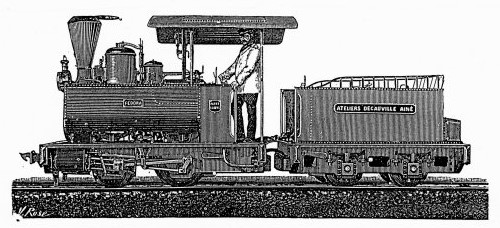
- Demonstration of the Decauville railway on 20 November 1886 Decauville locomotive Fedora, N° 26, empty weight: 4.5 t (9,900 lb)

Technical
- Line length: 2 km (1.2 mi)
- Track gauge: 600 mm (1 ft 11 5/8 in)

The Decauville railway Tianjin – Jinnan was a short 3 kilometres (1.9 miles) narrow gauge railway in China temporarily laid with a track gauge of 600 mm (1 ft 11 5/8 in) in Tianjin (Tientsin) in 1886.

== History ==
The test track was built with prefabricated and imported Decauville rails. It was officially inaugurated on 21 November 1886. The people of Tianjin gathered in front of the house of Zeng Laisun. The latter was the interpreter of General Li Hongzhang, who as Viceroy of Zhili initiated numerous reforms to modernise the country. The square in front of this house served as a railway station. The assembled visitors greeted the railway with enthusiasm, recognising the benefits such a system would bring to the nation. No protest was heard.

On 20 November 1886, or according to other accounts as early as 20 August 1886, a trial run was held in the presence of Li Hongzhang and other dignitaries including the Chairman of the Salt Tax Commission. This had been prepared by Gaston Galy. In the afternoon between 3:00 and 4:00 p.m. the Chinese politicians were received by a large group of foreigners and foreign consuls. The locomotive, which was decorated with flags of China, France and England, pulled 1st, 2nd and 3rd class carriages and a baggage car. The trial run was successful.[6] The train took less than 8 minutes to complete the winding route. The fact that Li Hongzhang had taken part in the demonstration was seen as a positive sign for the future.

The three-kilometre long demonstration railway (French chemin de fer portatif, genre Decauville) had a contract value of 48,100 silver Taels (269,360 Francs). It had previously been demonstrated in Hong Kong and in Canton (Guangzhou) in 1886 with the assistance of engineer Gaston Galy of the English-based commercial agency Jardine, Matheson Co, with whom Decauville had signed an exclusive ten-year contract in 1984 for the distribution of the Decauville system in China.

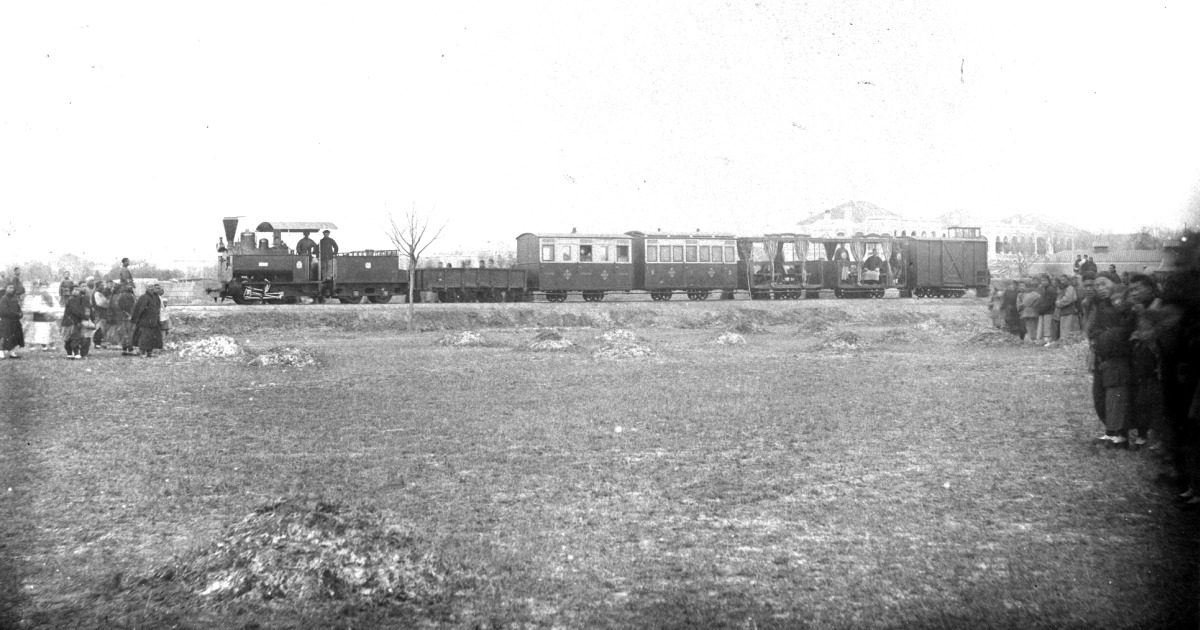
Decauville steam locomotive N° 26 Fedora with a train at Tianjin

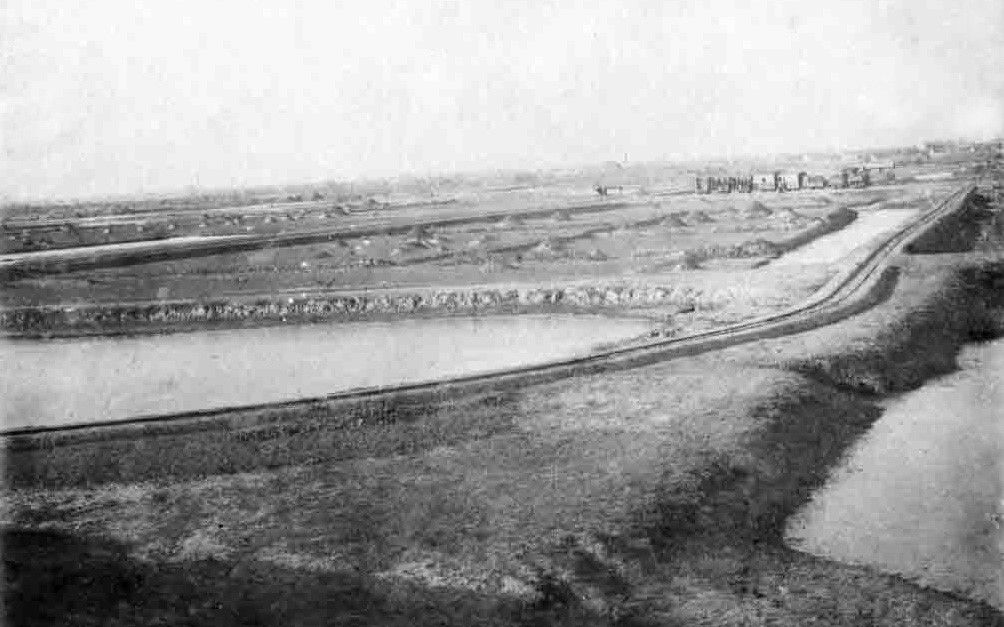
The train on the temporary Decauville track at Tianjin

The Frenchmen Thévenet and Paul Mignard had difficulties with the mandarins in the military administration because they opposed progress, as reported in March 1887. Thévenet hoped to build a narrow-gauge railway from Tianjin to Beijing. In April 1887, as the Chinese Admiralty recognised the importance of railways in troop transport at Tianjin and elsewhere, it was thought in France that there was a need for 4500 km of French-style narrow-gauge railway lines from Beijing beyond Canton to Hanoi.

Nearby, the Germans built another light railway in 1901, which connected the Tianjin coal yard with the Provisions Office 4 km (2.5 mi) away, for which a 20 m (66 ft) bridge was built. It was operated by horses until the arrival of locomotives.

== Literature ==
- P. A. Crush Chinese Railway Collection. Extracts from books, periodicals & newspapers. (PDF file, 1,4 MB)
- Dieter Brötel: Frankreich im fernen Osten: imperialistische Expansion in Siam und Malaya, Laos und China, 1880–1904. 1996.
- Early Chinese Narrow Gauge Railways - Part 1 by Peter Crush [ 柯睿思](external link to download PDF file, 6.86 MB)

== See also ==
- List of Decauville railways
