= Tramway of Quend-Plage and Fort-Mahon =

Railway line in France

Coordinates: 50.3181°N 1.5957°E

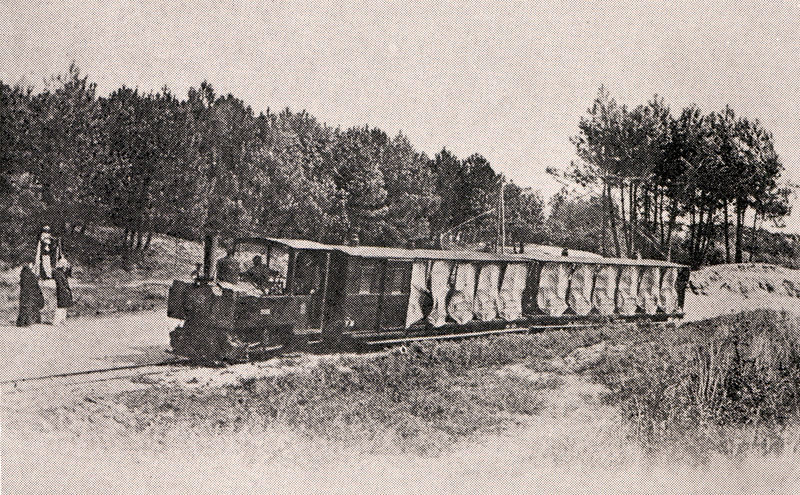
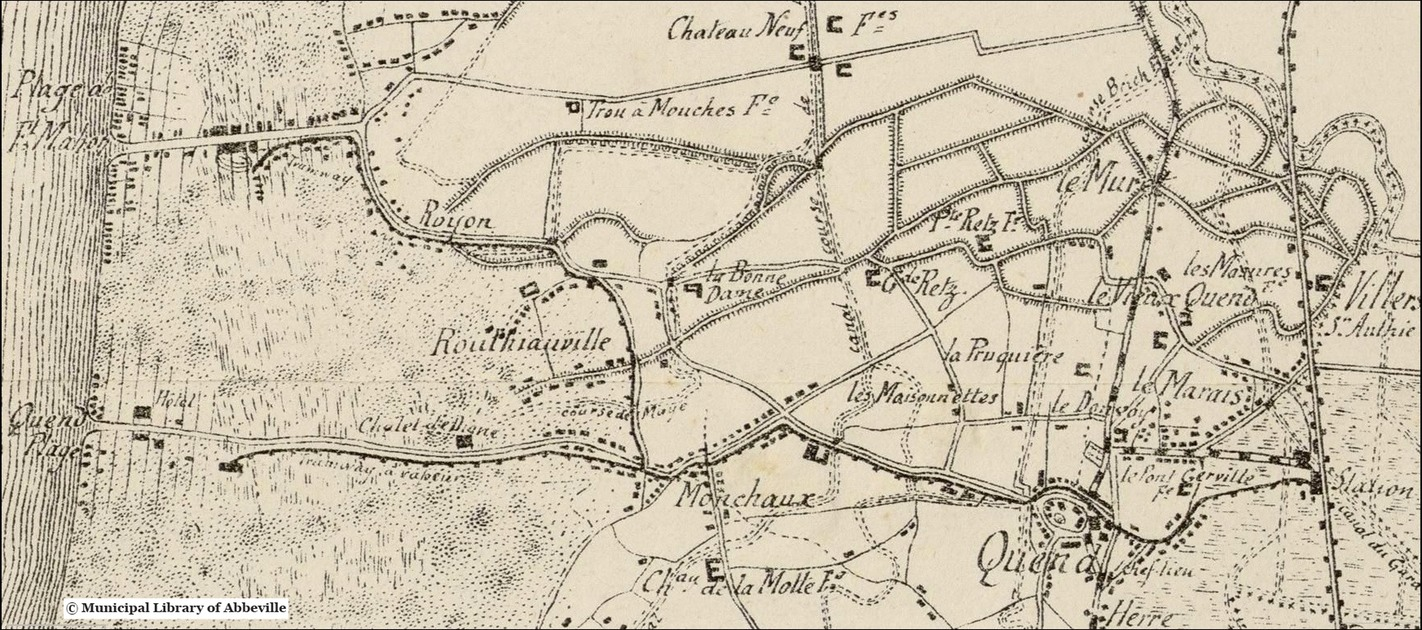
- Decauville summer cars as known from Expo 1889 Route

Overview
- Native name: Le tramway du Marquenterre

Technical
- Line length: 12.8 km (8.0 mi)
- Track gauge: 600 mm (1 ft 11 5/8 in)
- Minimum radius: 30m

The Tramway of Quend-Plage and Fort-Mahon (French: le tramway de Quend-Plage et Fort-Mahon or le tramway du Marquenterre) was a 12.8 km (8.0 mi) long 600 mm (1 ft 11 5/8 in) gauge railway line, which operated from 1898-1914 and 1921-1934.

== History ==
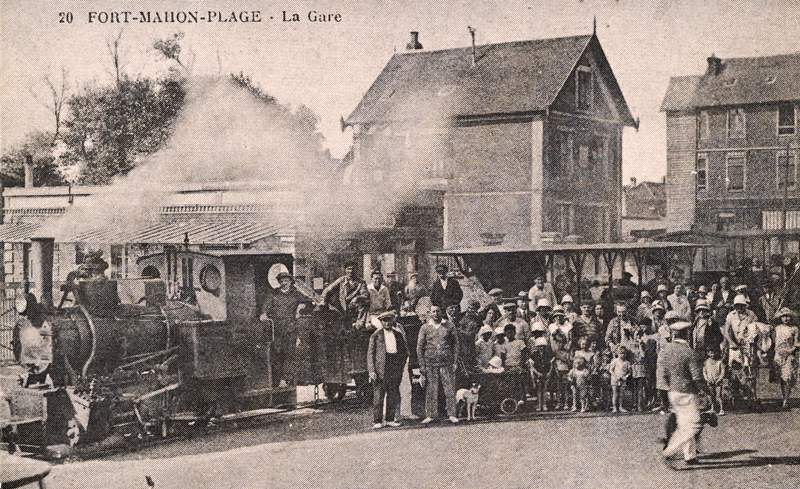
Station at Fort-Mahon-Plage

The Société Immobilière de Saint-Quentin-Plage built the 8 km (5.0 mi) long narrow-gauge tramway from the station Quend-Fort-Mahon to the beach at Quend-Plage (previously known as Saint-Quentin-Plage). (Note: The Société Immobilière de Saint-Quentin-Plage was set-up in 1893 by Félix Martin under the name of Goutelon et Compagnie in Paris. It was re-incorporated on 27 August 1896 as Société Anonyme de Quend-Plage, a PLC with a capital of 700,000 Franc with its headquarters in 47 rue Taitbout in Paris. Félix Martin and Goutelon were the main share holders.) The tramway was inaugurated in 1898. In 1903, a 4.8 km (3.0 mi) long branch line was built to the beach at Fort-Mahon-Plage. A single journey from Quend-Fort-Mahon to Quend-Plage lasted 30 min, and to Fort-Mahon-Plage it lasted 40 min.

In 1914, the portable pieces of track with a rail weight of 9.5 to 15 kg/m (19 to 30 lb/yd) were lifted to be used during World War I and re-laid in 1919. The tramway was re-commissioned on 13 Juli 1921. The tramway was used until May 1932 and formally closed on 26. February 1934.

== Rolling stock ==
=== Locomotives ===
Name	Type	Manufacturer	Works No	Year	Weight	Comments
Jeanette	0-4-0T	Decauville	N°230	1898	5 t	Mark 3.1, obtained second-hand from Coulange & Tayart
Bienvenue	0-4-2T	Decauville	N°279	1899	7,2 t	
Minus	0-4-0T	Decauville				Mark 3.2
	0-6-2T	Borsig/Decauville	N°7966		10 t	Delivered in April 1911
Marie-Antoinette	0-4-0T	Orenstein & Koppel				

=== Carriages ===
Initially, two open Decauville summer cars, one Decauville saloon car and three V-skip trucks were used.
