= Elsenborn Camp Railway =

Coordinates: 50.4645°N 6.1888°E

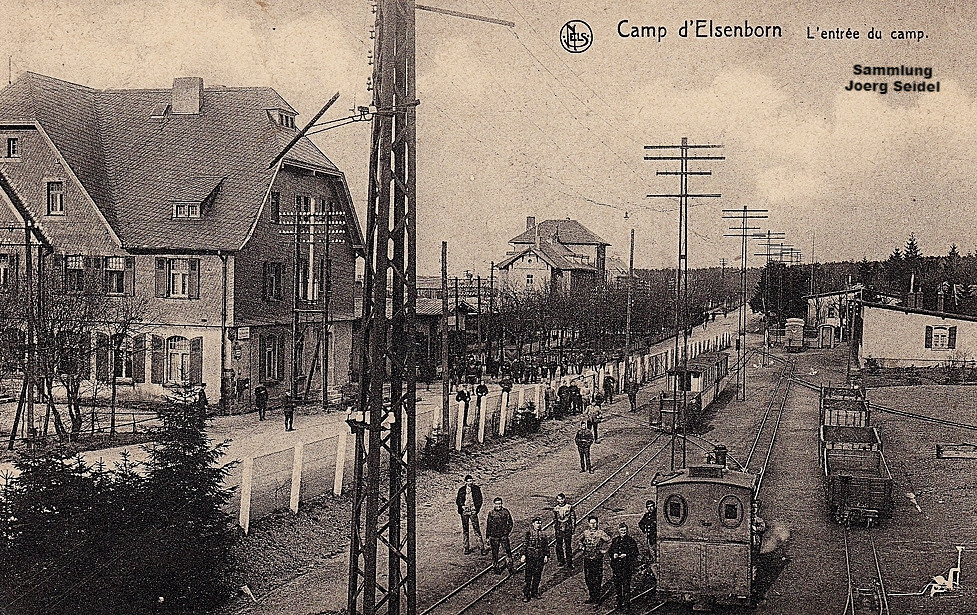
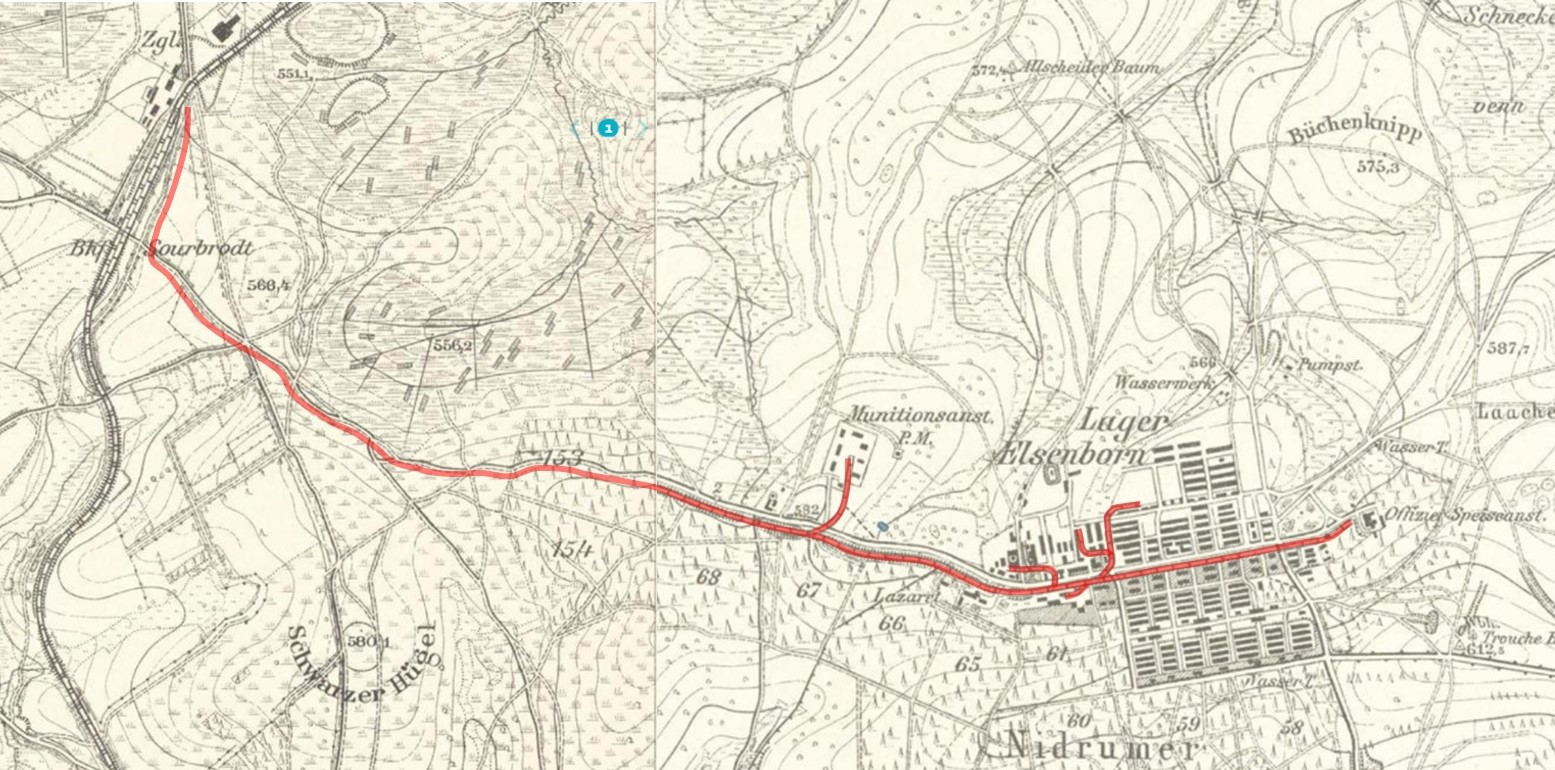
- Brigade steam locomotives in the 1920s Route from Elsenborn Camp to Sourbrodt on the standard gauge Vennbahn

Technical
- Line length: 3.2 km (2.0 mi)
- Track gauge: 600 mm (1 ft 11 5/8 in)

The Elsenborn Camp Railway was a 3.2 km (2.0 mi) long 600 mm (1 ft 11 5/8 in) gauge railway line which connected the Elsenborn Camp near Elsenborn with Sourbrodt railway station on the standard gauge Vennbahn in Belgium from 1901 to 1939.

== History ==
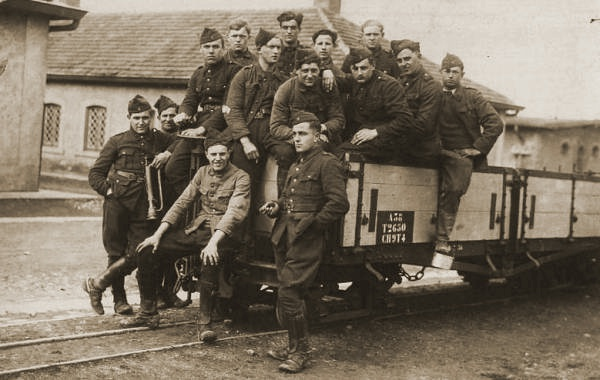
Regiment Spoorweg troops on a narrow gauge waggon

The track was laid in 1900 and inaugurated in 1901. Since 1918 German 0-8-0 brigade steam locomotives of the Heeresfeldbahn were used on the line. The railway was subsequently nicknamed Elijah's Chariot of Fire (Feuriger Elias) and used for goods and passenger trains. Reverend Pietkin was not amused by the increasing alcohol consumption and prostitution around the railway station, when he warned from the pulpit about the railway's curse with the aphorism: "C'est le chemin de l'enfer!" ("This is railway to hell!")

The transport unit employed about 70 civilians, most of whom were recruited from the surrounding population. It was moved to the Bressoux barracks during the winter months, when there were no exercises on the square. In the run-up to World War II, the camp, with the exception of permanent employees, was largely abandoned due to the general mobilization of Belgium, and in 1939 the narrow-gauge railway was taken out of use and its track was lifted.
