= Naphtha Hill Decauville Railway =

Former railway in Turkmenistan

Coordinates: 39.350053°N 54.176432°E

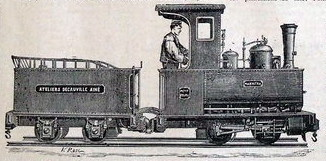
- Oil fired Decauville steam locomotive in Turkestan

Technical
- Line length: 32.5 km (20.2 mi)
- Track gauge: 500 mm (19 3/4 in)
Route map
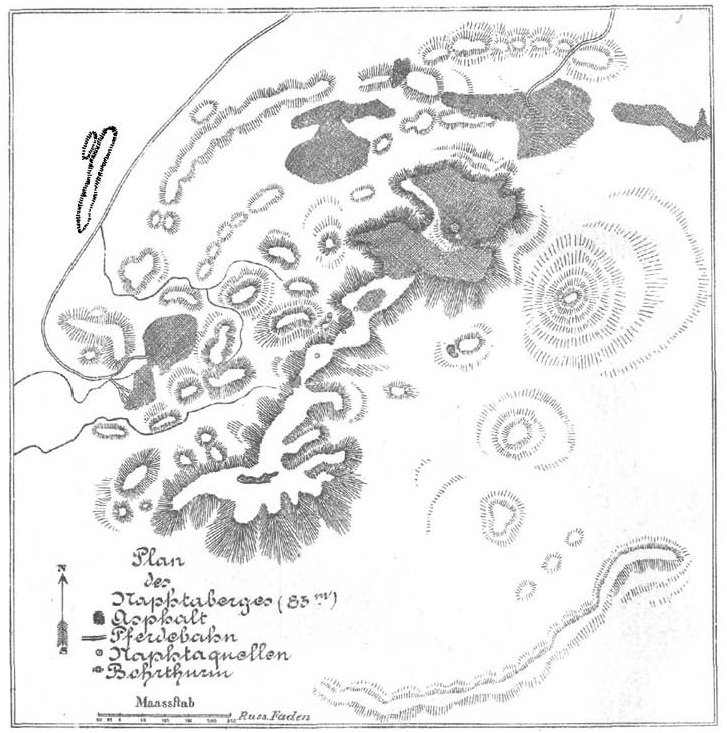
Horse-drawn tramway at Naphtha Hill, 1887

The Naphtha Hill Decauville Railway was a 32.5 km (20.2 mi) long horse-drawn railway with a gauge of 500 mm (19 3/4 in), which was supplied by the French company Decauville. It operated around 1885-1889 near Bala-Ischem, 12 km (7.5 mi) southeast of Balkanabat in Turkestan (historical name for a part of today's Turkmenistan and six other states). Its track and rolling stock were originally used during the construction of the Transcaspian Railway to transport the rails and sleepers to the construction site using two oil-fired Decauville steam locomotives with works numbers N° 9 and N° 10. It was built with portable track, i.e. 5 m long rail panels prefabricated in France with a track gauge of 500 mm (19 3/4 in).

== History ==
During the construction of the 5 ft (1,524 mm) broad-gauge railway from Mikhailovsk to Kysyl-Arwat (now Serdar), the engineers and construction workers used the portable Decauville railway with a length of 100 km (62 mi), which was powered by two small oil-fired Decauville steam locomotives. As soon as the broad-gauge tracks had been laid, the narrow-gauge tracks were dismantled at the start of the narrow-gauge line and laid to new construction sites at the end of the line. By the time the broad-gauge railroad to Serdar was completed, the Decauville line was already running to Bami. The line would probably have remained there for maintenance and transportation, if huge naphtha and ozokerite deposits had not been found at Naphtha Hill, 26.5 km (16.5 mi) southwest of the Tagyr wells.

The ozokerite could be used to produce naphtha fuel for the broad-gauge locomotives. It had previously to be delivered from Baku or the Cheleken Peninsula. As a result of this discovery, the Decauville railway was moved to Naphtha Hill (Neftjanaja Gora). It transported all the fuel for the locomotives of the broad-gauge line.

The line was presumably always operated only by horses. At least, it was called a horse-drawn tramway in 1887. Kyrgyz Horses were used, which could haul about 800 to 1,000 kg (1,800 to 2,200 lb) per working day over a distance of 40 km (25 mi). In 1889 the line was already closed.

Today, a shorter broad-gauge line runs straight from Balkanabat to Uzboý on Naphtha Hill (also known until 1939 as Neftedag or gora Neftjanaja in Turkmen language, i.e. literally Naphtha or Petrol Hill, and until 2003 as imeni 26 Bakinskich Kommissarow in Russian).

== Location ==
The horse-drawn railway connected Bala-Ischem railway station with Naphtha Hill. The 32.5 km (20.2 mi) long line ran in an almost straight line in a west-southwesterly direction. On the way back the extracted naphtha was transported from the mine to the Transcaspian Railway.

The Bala-Ischem station was located on the Transcaspian Railway. It was 57 km (35 mi) away from the end point of the railway at that time at Michailovski saliv (Михайловский залив) and 9 km (5.6 mi) south of the Uly Balkan mountains. The station was located about 10 km (6.2 mi) south of a spring a few hundred meters above the steppe.

The Naphtha mountain is of only insignificant height. It rises only 83 m (272 ft) above the level of the steppe at Bala-Ischem and cannot be compared with the Uly Balkan (1,817 m (5,961 ft) above sea level) or the Small Balkan (875 m (2,871 ft) m above sea level). The actual Naphtha mountain consists of a mountain range running from southwest to northeast of about 2 km (1.2 mi) length and 1 km (0.62 mi) width. I has no particularly steep slopes and gradually descends in the longitudinal direction to the level of the steppe. Parallel to the mountain, there are smaller hills on its north and south sides. The oval plateau bounded by them has a size of 3 km × 4 km (1.9 mi × 2.5 mi).

== Route and geology ==
On the first 5 kilometres (3 mi) behind the station, the route led over a flat steppe area consisting of prehistoric clay mixed with sand, in which numerous round-cut stones, mostly less than the size of hazelnuts, are embedded.

From the fifth kilometre (third mile) onwards, the route led through brown hills consisting of clay layers with dense horizontal stratification. These formations are probably sediments from the nearby old riverbed of the Usboj, to which the section shortly afterwards led down without any noticeable difference in level. At this point, the river must have expanded into a wide, very shallow lake or pond. The ground here is saturated with salt, like the ponds on both sides of the railway wall, in which several centimetres thick, white or light bark of pure salt was present. Layers of pure salt were found everywhere under the surface. These salt deposits had a thickness of 125–150 mm (5–6 in) and were only covered by 25–75 mm (1–3 in) deep, hard baked sand. No grass grew in this desert, and no trace of life made itself felt. The only stones encountered were broken pieces of salt, and along the way there was a house built entirely of carved salt blocks, which was not damaged by the weak rain that rarely occurred in this area. This salt desert is 12–15 km (7.5–9.3 mi) wide.

From the 24th kilometre (15th mile) on, dunes and drifting sand began to form, they continued and multiplied the closer one came to Naphtha Hill. This section was in constant battle with the moving sand mountains and required constant shifting and renewal of the route. In the valley behind the ring wall-like elevation, the horse-drawn carriage led to the drilling rigs No. 1 and No. 2, which stood on layers of sand and grey, sandy clay. On the southern slope of the mountain there were layers strongly saturated with asphalt. On the ridge there were springs from which salty water, naphtha and hydrocarbon gas came. The westernmost of these springs was about 67 m (220 ft) higher than the drilling rigs. It flowed into a round, boiling swamp with a diameter of 1 m (3.3 ft) and abundant salt deposits all around the walls. Black, thick naphtha floated on its surface. Small pieces or spheres of earth wax rose together with the naphtha in this spring. The wax was brown, kneadable, and had an aromatic odor. It accumulated at the edges of the spring and the associated outlet channel. The quality was not particularly good, as it was coffee or chocolate brown, while the better Galician earth wax was yellow. It was assumed that there had to be considerable amounts of earth wax in the depths, as quite a lot flowed out.

== Locomotives ==
In Turkestan, two oil-fired Decauville steam locomotives were used on the track material of the constructor's railway, which was subsequently reused to build the horse-drawn tramway. It is not known whether these locomotives were still in working order during the construction and operation of the Naphtha Hill line around 1885.

Manufacturer	Works No	Year	Type	Gauge	Empty weight	Loaded weight	Name	Operator
Decauville	N° 9	ca 1880	0-4-0	500 mm (19 3/4 in)	2,75 t	3,5 t	Малютка/Maljutka (»Baby«)	Government of Russia (Turkestan War)
Decauville	N° 10	ca 1880	0-4-0	500 mm (19 3/4 in)	2,75 t	3,5 t	Бы́стрый/Bystry (»Quickly«)	Government of Russia (Turkestan War)
