= Decauville railway Narès–Inglis–Topçin–Vatiluk =

Coordinates: 40.7640°N 22.7000°E

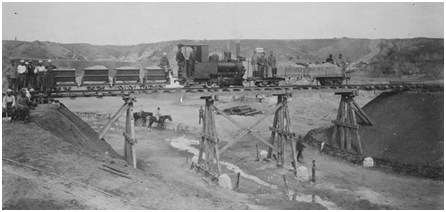
- Bridge over the Vatiluk Gorge

Technical
- Line length: 30–35 km (19–22 mi)
- Track gauge: 600 mm (1 ft 11 5/8 in)
Route map
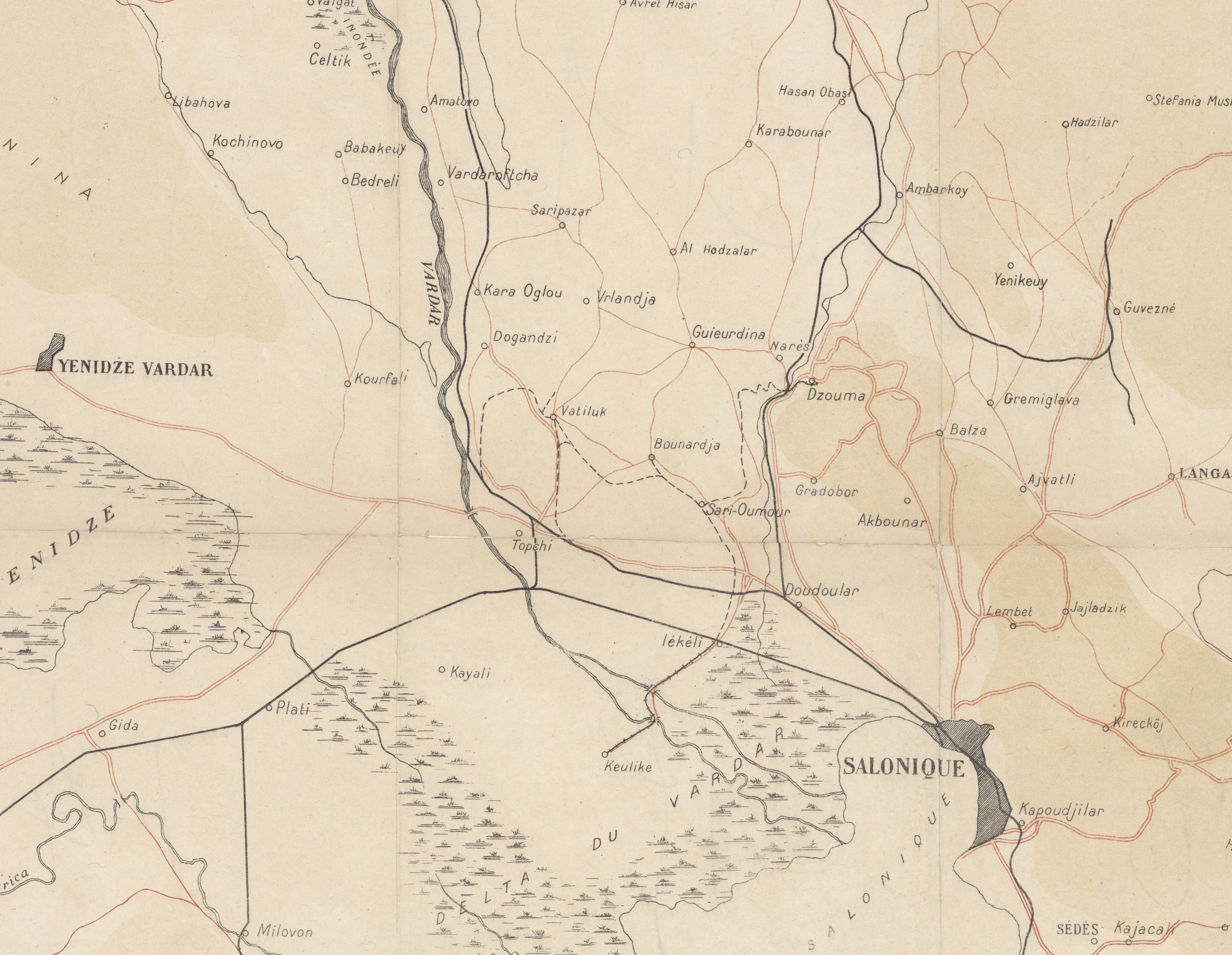
Route on 1 January 1918

The Decauville railway Narès–Inglis–Topçin–Vatiluk was around 1916 a 30–35 km (19–22 mi) long narrow-gauge military railway near Thessaloniki in Greece with a gauge of 600 mm (1 ft 11 5/8 in)

== Route ==
The 30–35 km (19–22 mi) long semicircular narrow gauge network with a track gauge of 600 mm (1 ft 11 5/8 in) from Narès (now Nea Filadelfeia, Νέα Φιλαδέλφεια) via Bumardza (now Bougaríevo, Μπουγαρίεβο), Sari-Omer (Σαρή Ομέρ), Inglis (now Anchialos, Αγχίαλος) and Topçin (now Gefyra, Γέφυρα) to Vatiluk (now Vathylakkos, Βαθύλακκος).

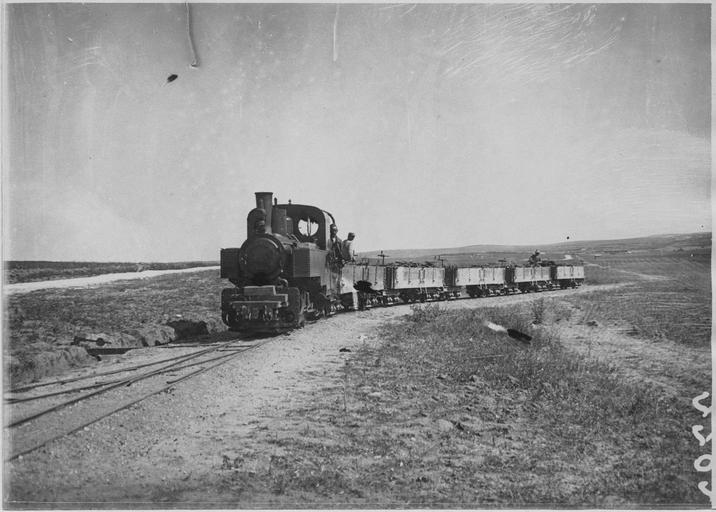
Near Topçin, June 1916

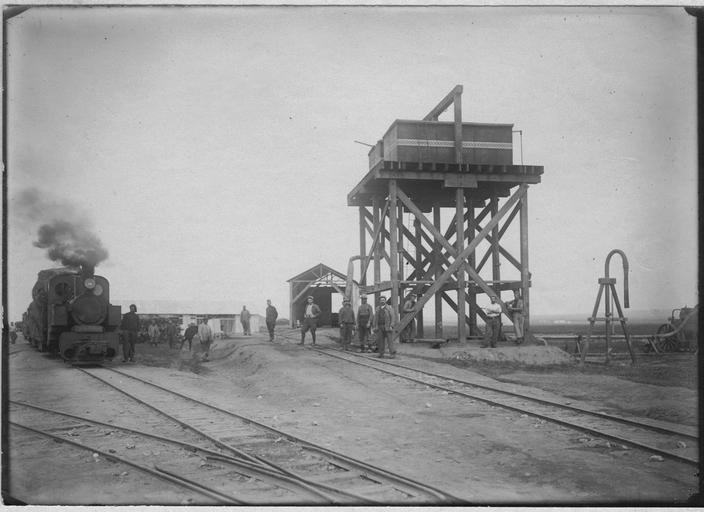
Inglis station

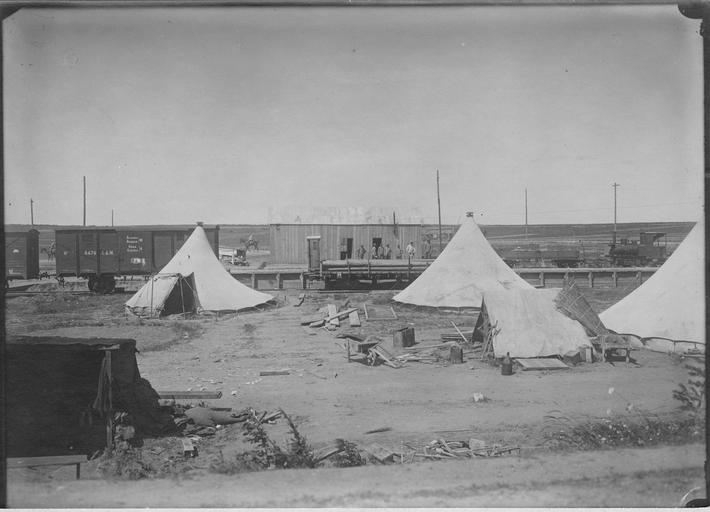
Tents

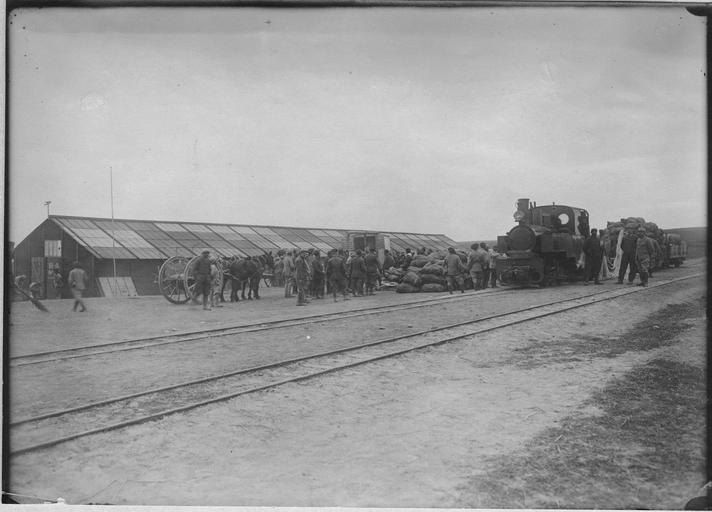
Station, Dec. 1916

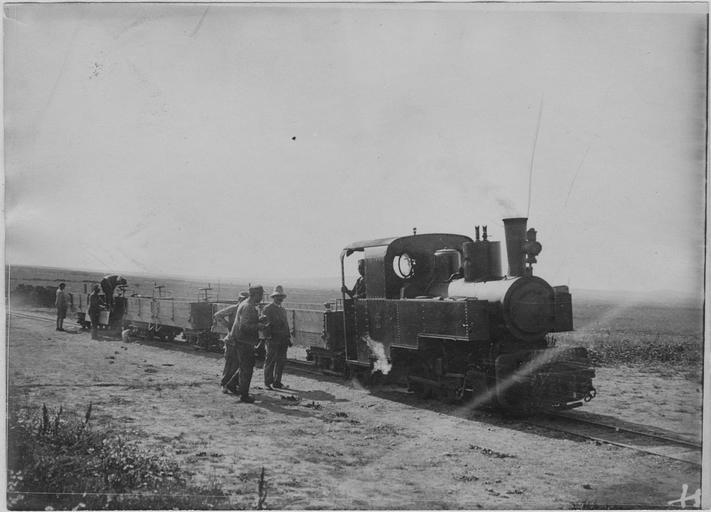
Decauville loco
