= Decauville Railway of the Bancalari Mill =

Coordinates: 34.47193°S 58.99263°W

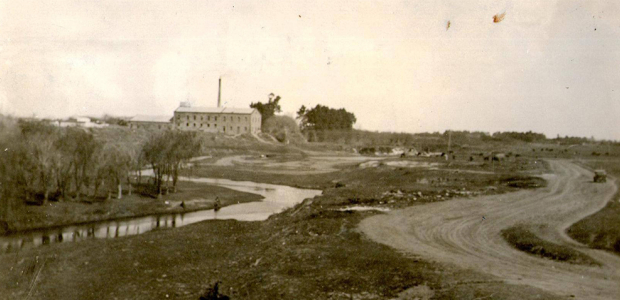
- The Bancalari Mill building (with its chimey visible at background) in 1887

Overview
- Native name: Ferrocarril Decauville del Molino Bancalari
- Locale: Pilar Partido
- Termini: Molino Bancalari; Manzanares

Service
- Type: Commuter rail

History
- Opened: 1889
- Closed: 1920s

Technical
- Line length: 12 km (7.5 mi)
- Number of tracks: 1
- Track gauge: 600 mm (1 ft 11 5/8 in)
Route map
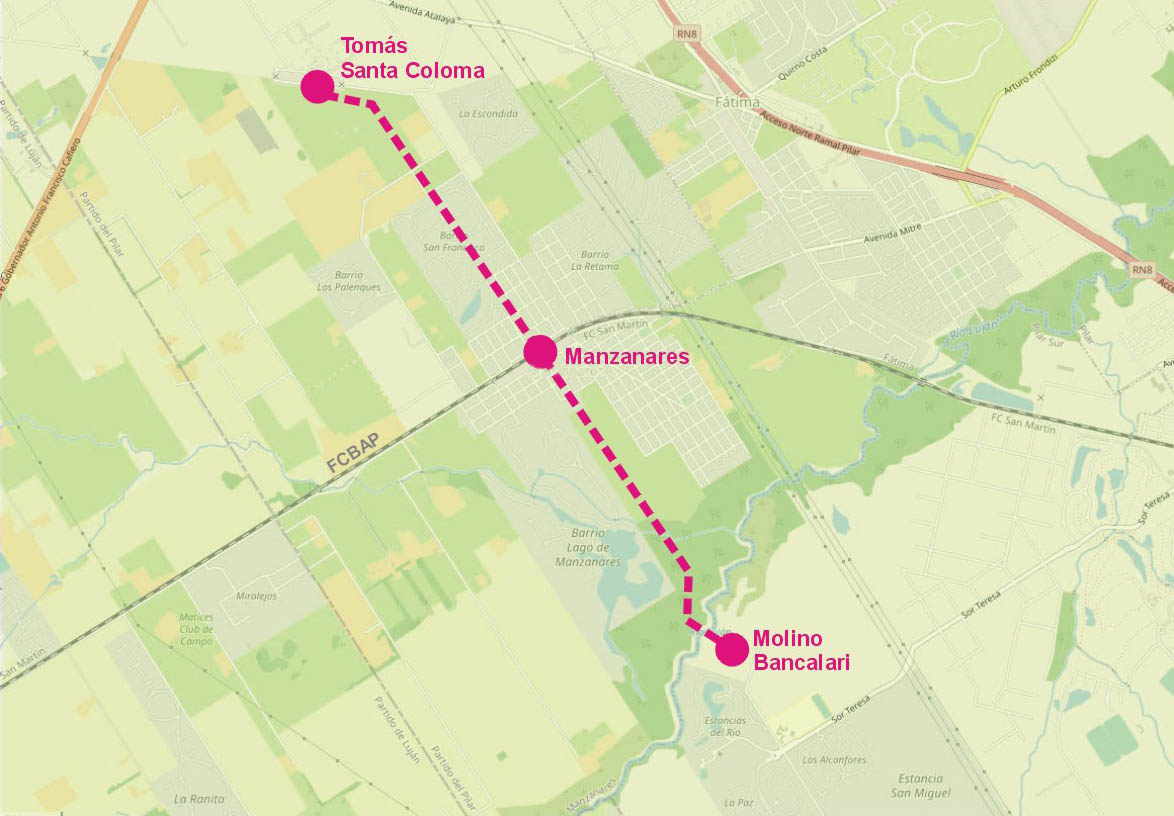
Former route superimposed onto modern map

The Decauville Railway of the Bancalari Mill (Spanish Ferrocarril Decauville del Molino Bancalari) was a 5.4 km (3.4 mi) long narrow-gauge railway with a gauge of 600 mm (1 ft 11 5/8 in), which was laid around 1889 in Manzanares, a town belonging to Pilar Partido in the Buenos Aires Province of Argentina.

The mill was founded in 1874 by Italian immigrant to Argentina, Miguel Bancalari, being also the first industry in Pilar Partido.

== History ==
The 5 m (16 ft) long track panels with Vignoles rails on steel sleepers as well as the light railway wagons were probably imported from Decauville in France to build up a flood protection embankment running in parallel to the river. The portable track, of which a picture from 1887 is still preserved, was repeatedly extended on the dam and then dismantled in sections until the dam was completed.

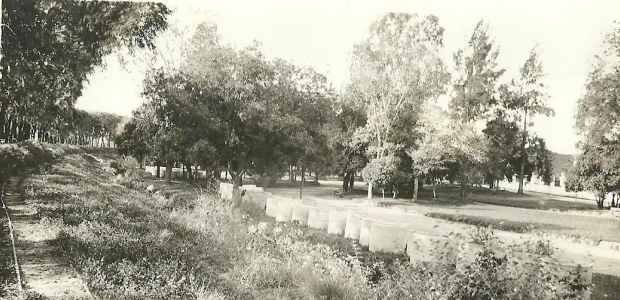
Decauville railway track on the flood water embankment of the Luján River

The family of the Italian immigrant Miguel Bancalari ran since 28 February 1874 a grain mill on the Luján River near the town of Pilar. They re-laid the Decauville railway after the opening of the "Tranvia Rural de la Provincia de Buenos Aires" ('Rural Tramway of the Buenos Aires Province'), whose former route is still visible in satellite photos.

When the Buenos Aires and Pacific Railway was built, it would have had to cross the existing Decauville railway on an elaborate bridge structure. When the Manzanares station was opened on 24 May 1889, the shortened Decauville railway ended on its southern side.

After the mill was closed, the railway continued to operate to bring milk cans from nearby dairy farms to Manzanares.

Similar Decauville railways were also used in the construction of the Basilica of Our Lady of Luján to bring the bricks from what is now San Bernardo to the Descanso del Peregrino workshop. Later, they were used for the construction of other historical buildings on the banks of the river as well as for excursions.

== Route ==
The route led from the Tomás Santa Coloma station (built by the "Tranvía Rural" company, property of the Lacroze brothers to serve the mill) on today's Camino de Rio Hondo and the Camino de El Trébol through the village of Manzanares in a southeasterly direction. In the area of the Luján River the route crossed a high and narrow dam and several watercourses, in particular using a steel bridge over the Arroyo Las Flores. Finally, it crossed the Luján River on a brick dam and ended at the Bancalari mill.

When the mill closed in 1919, the train continued operation for some time to transport milk from dairy industries in the zone.
