= Société Coloniale des Chaux et Ciments de Portland de Marseille =

Coordinates: 43.36769883434299°N 5.3052360256555335°E

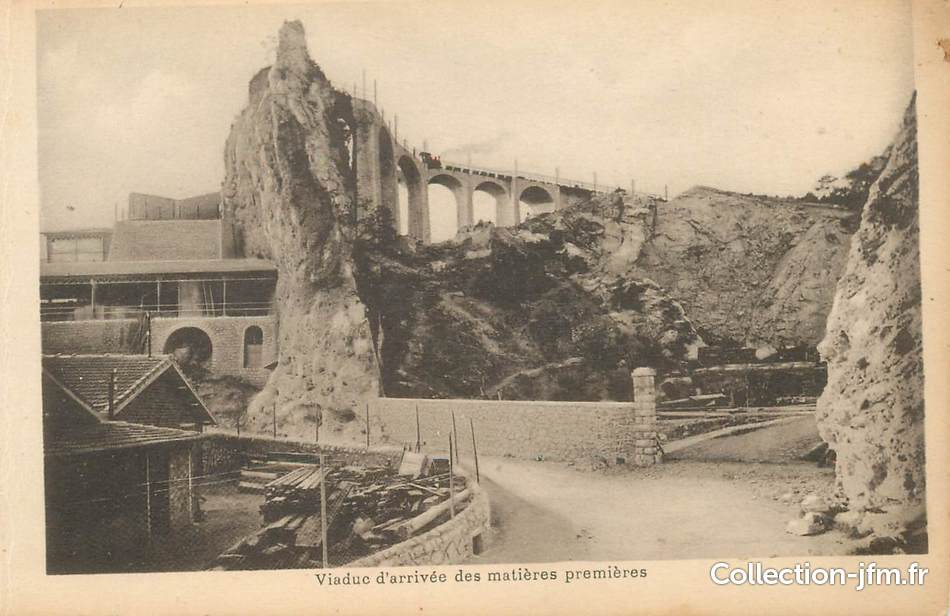
Decauville railway on the bridge to feed the cement plant in L'Estaque

The Société Coloniale des Chaux et Ciments de Portland de Marseille (Occitan: Societat Coloniala de Calçs e Ciments de Portland de Marselha; Colonial Company for Lime and Portland Cements in Marseille) owned and operated cement works in L'Estaque near Marseille in the department of Bouches-du-Rhône.

== History ==
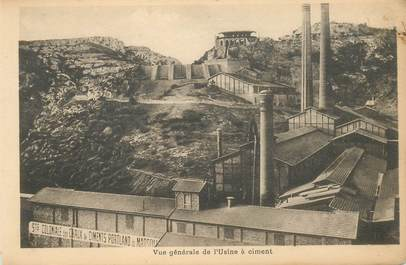
Cement works

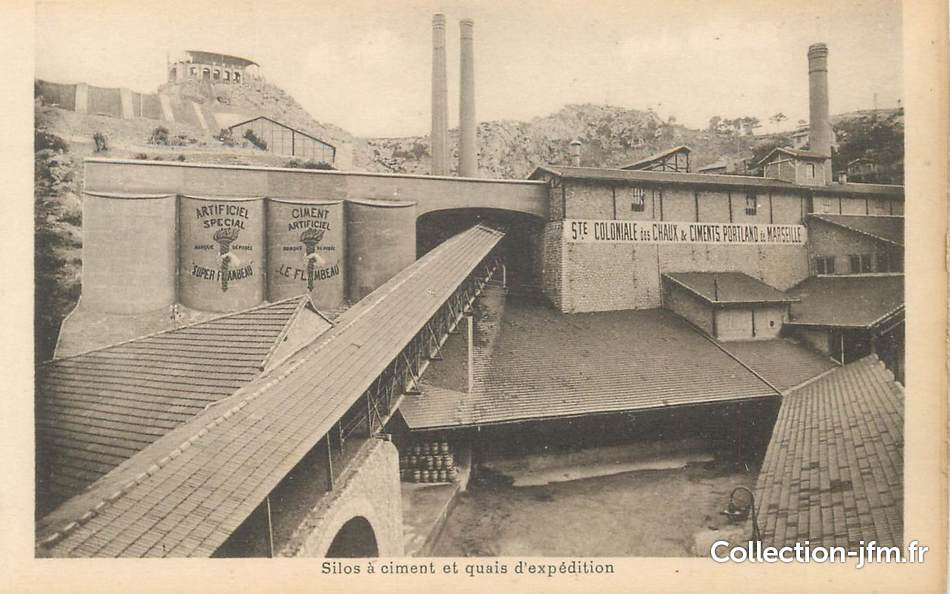
Conveyor and silos

The joint-stock company was founded on 20 November 1913 with a share capital of 4 million francs for a period of 50 years. The initial capital was increased to 2.5 mio francs in 1919, to 4.25 mio francs in April 1923 and to 5 mio francs in May 1929.

Messrs M. Siegfried, A. Cailler, J. Lindenmeyer, G. Bonnet, P. Bourcart, H. Gunthert, G. Roussy and M. Obellianne were appointed to the Board of Directors.

== Purpose of the Company ==
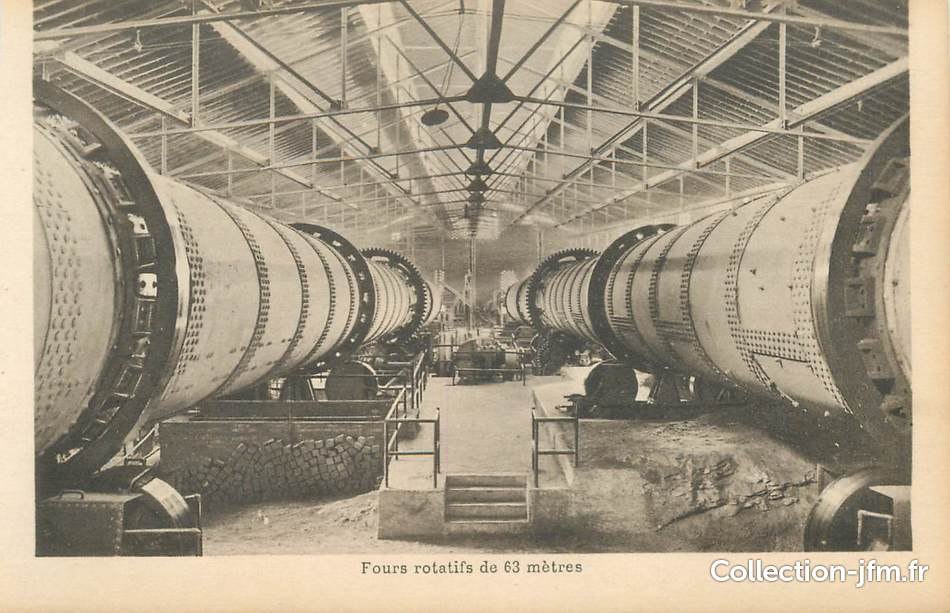
Rotary kilns

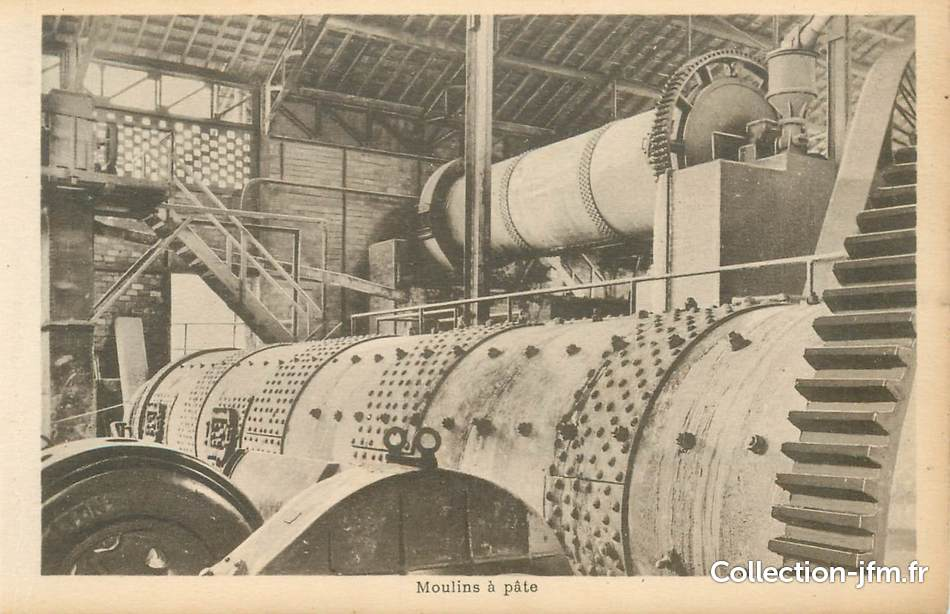
Cement mill

The objectives of the company were as follows:

1. Manufacture, sale and export of lime, cement and hydraulic products.
2. Acquisition, lease, development and operation of lime and cement quarries in the department of Bouches-du-Rhône or in another region, in particular the quarries in La Nerthe.
3. Acquisition, construction and operation of all plant necessary for the company and the development of buildings and all movable and immovable property transactions.
4. Industrial or financial operations related to the above objects.

== Narrow gauge railway ==
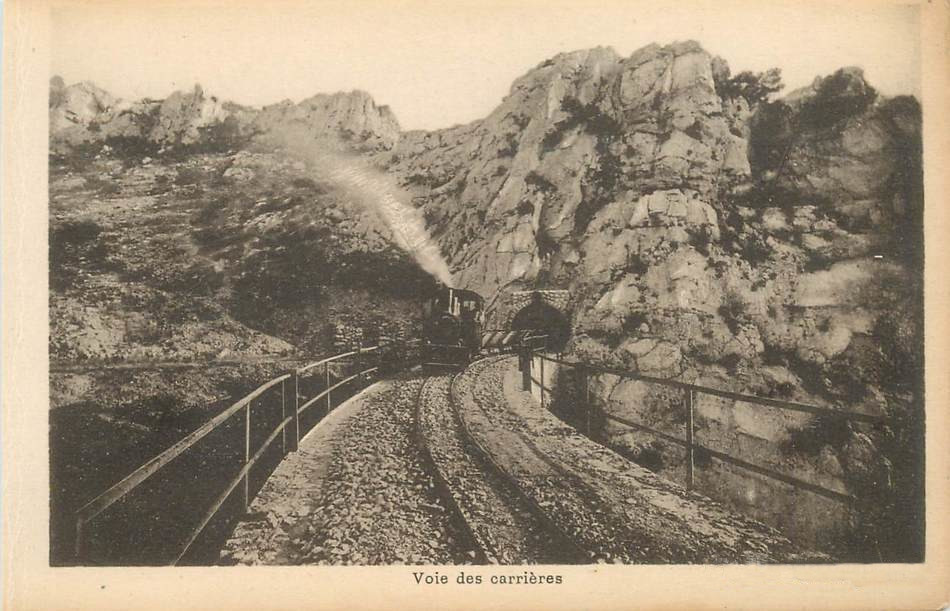
Decauville locomotive with V skip wagons from the quarry to the kilns

The company operated a works-owned Decauville railway with a gauge of 600 mm (1 ft 11 5/8 in) from the quarries to the cement factory.

== Shipping ==
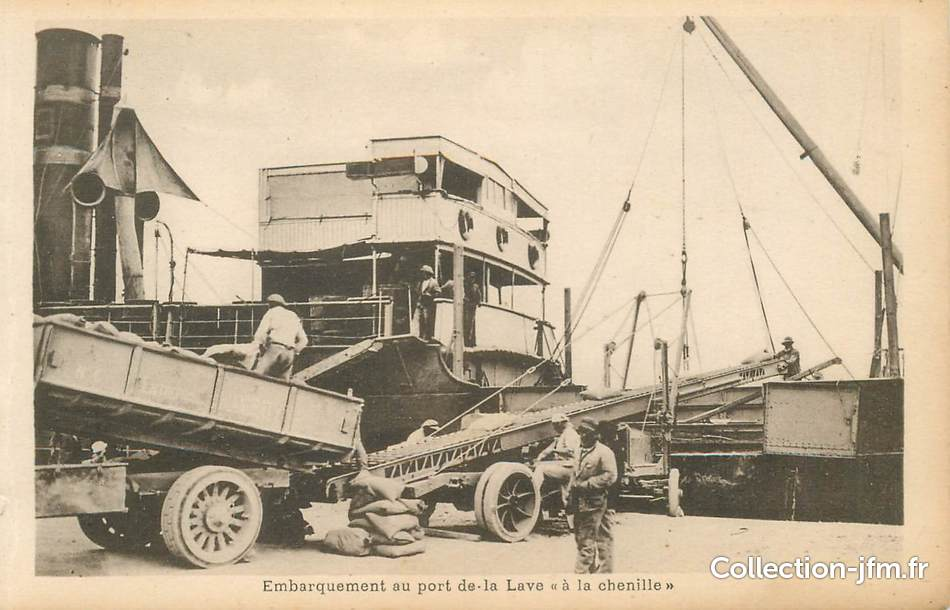
Shipping 'a la chenille' by conveyor belt

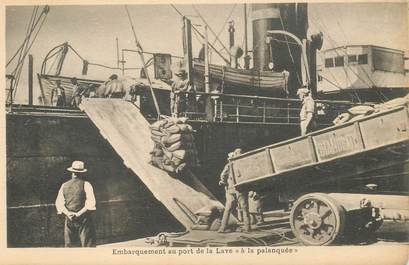
Shipping 'a la palanquée' by crane and ramp

Finished products destined for export were transported by lorry to the Port de la Lave, where they were loaded onto cargo ships. Two methods were used for this:

- 'A la chenille', packed in bags as general cargo via a conveyor belt.
- 'A la palanquée', packed in sacks as general cargo by crane over a ramp.

== See also ==
- Decauville wagon
