= Rufisque tramway =

Coordinates: 14.715001°N 17.272388°W

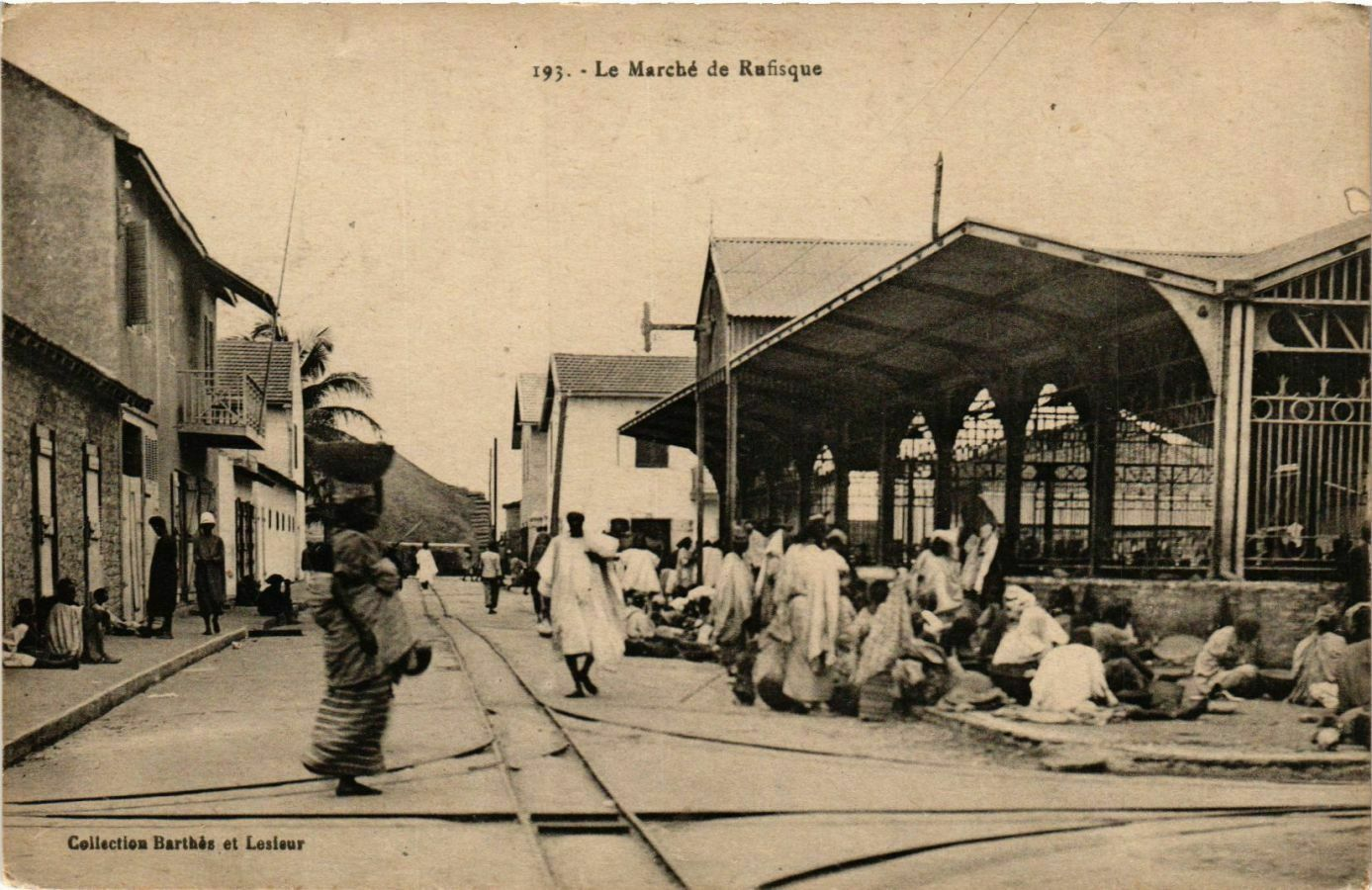
- Crossing at the market

Technical
- Line length: 14 km (8.7 mi)
- Track gauge: 400 mm (15 3/4 in) and 600 mm (1 ft 11 5/8 in)

The Rufisque tramway (French Le Decauville Municipal de Rufisque) was a 14 km (8.7 mi) long, hand-operated light railway with track gauges of 400 mm (15 3/4 in) and 600 mm (1 ft 11 5/8 in) in Rufisque in Senegal.

== History ==
Around 1860, at least around 1,500 tonnes (1,653 short tons; 1,476 long tons) and in 1867 around 5,600 tonnes (6,173 short tons; 5,512 long tons) of unpeeled peanuts were shipped in the port of Rufisque, which were brought there by camel.^{p. 405} According to more recent estimates, this figure could have been more than 23,000 tonnes (25,353 short tons; 22,637 long tons) by 1880.

In order to simplify transport, the first manually operated Decauville Railway was laid in the city around 1880. Initially, individual peanut trading companies, known as escales, installed the rails for various light railways on their own initiative for their own needs, but later the company's own tram systems were consolidated into a municipal system.

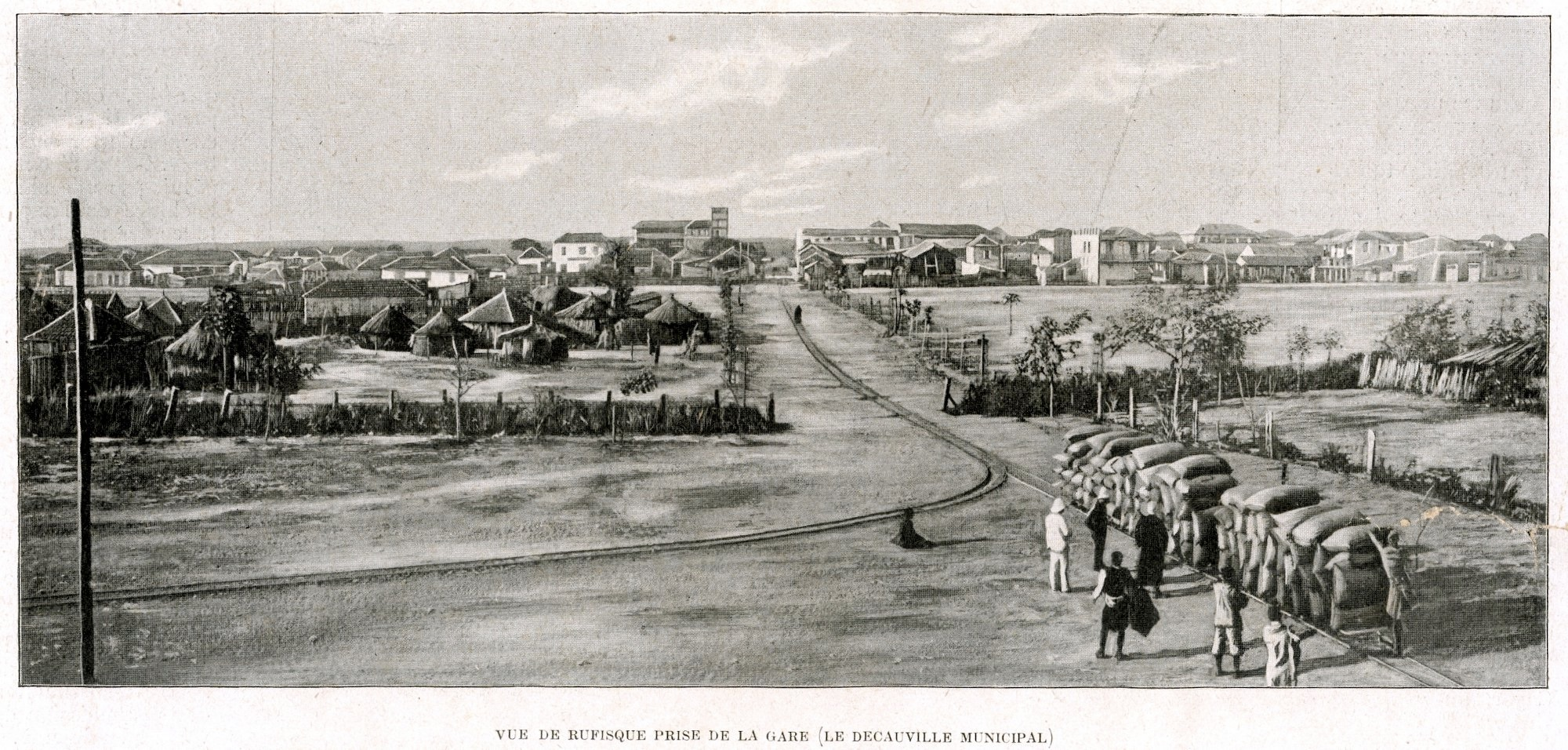
"Le Decauville Municipal", c. 1895

From 1883 there was also a 1,000 mm (3 ft 3 3/8 in) metre gauge railway from Rufisque to Dakar.^{S. 413}

Because of the insufficient water depth in the harbour for ocean-going vessels, small boats transported the sacked peanuts from the quay to the ships anchored outside the city. A 1200-ton ship needed four days in Rufisque to pick up a full load, one day more than in the deep-sea port of Dakar. Around 1905 it was decided to build a 200-metre (660 ft) long pier.

A toll of two francs had to be paid to transport a ton of peanuts on the Decauville inner-city railway. This toll, which was the main source of income for the city budget, amounted to three francs after the construction of the pier, because economic competition with Dakar no longer played a significant role for Rufisque since then.

From 1902 the economic situation in Rufisque worsened because Dakar, 28 km (17 mi) to the northwest, became the capital of French West Africa, after and due to the construction of a deep sea port and the metre gauge railway, which made it more accessible than before. The population of Rufisque nevertheless increased during this period from 4500 in 1866 to 8000 in 1891 and 15,000 in 1914.^{p. 420}

In 1910, 1660 ships docked at Rufisque, importing 50,000 tonnes (55,116 short tons; 49,210 long tons) and exporting 140,000 tonnes (154,324 short tons; 137,789 long tons). The most important import was coal.

== Old post cards ==
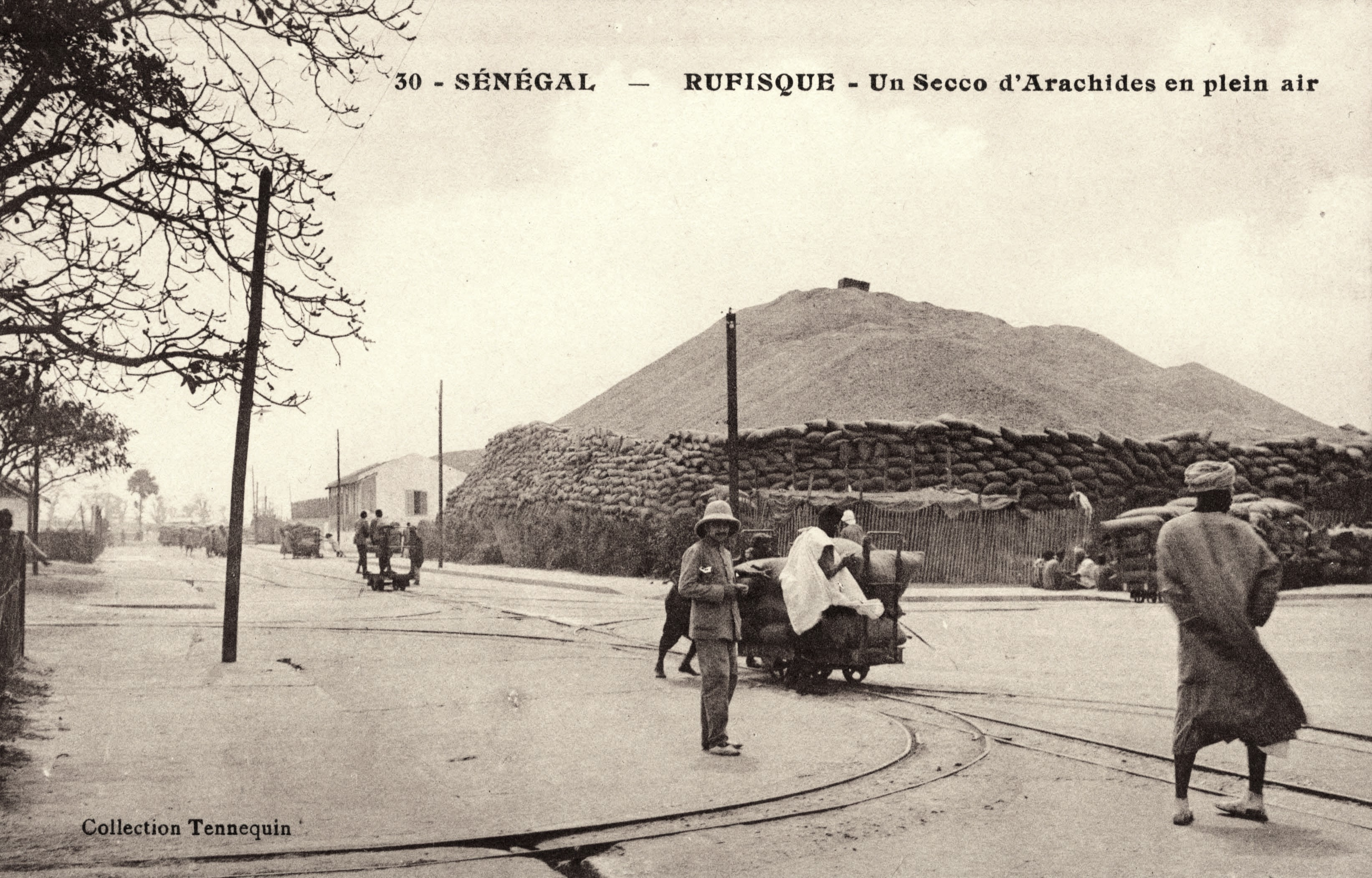
Open-air peanuts dump

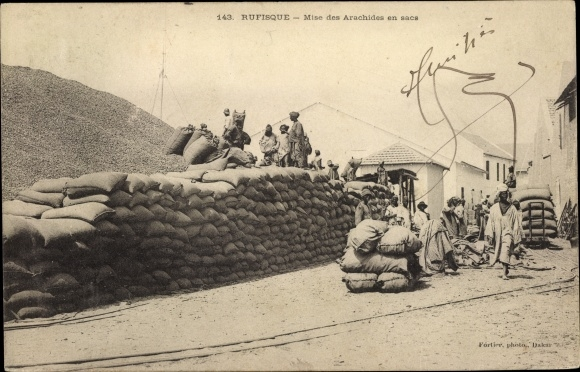
Packing into sacks

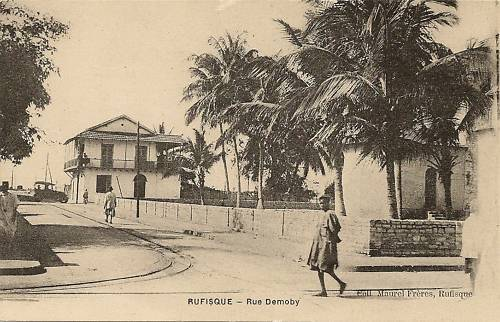
Rue Demoby

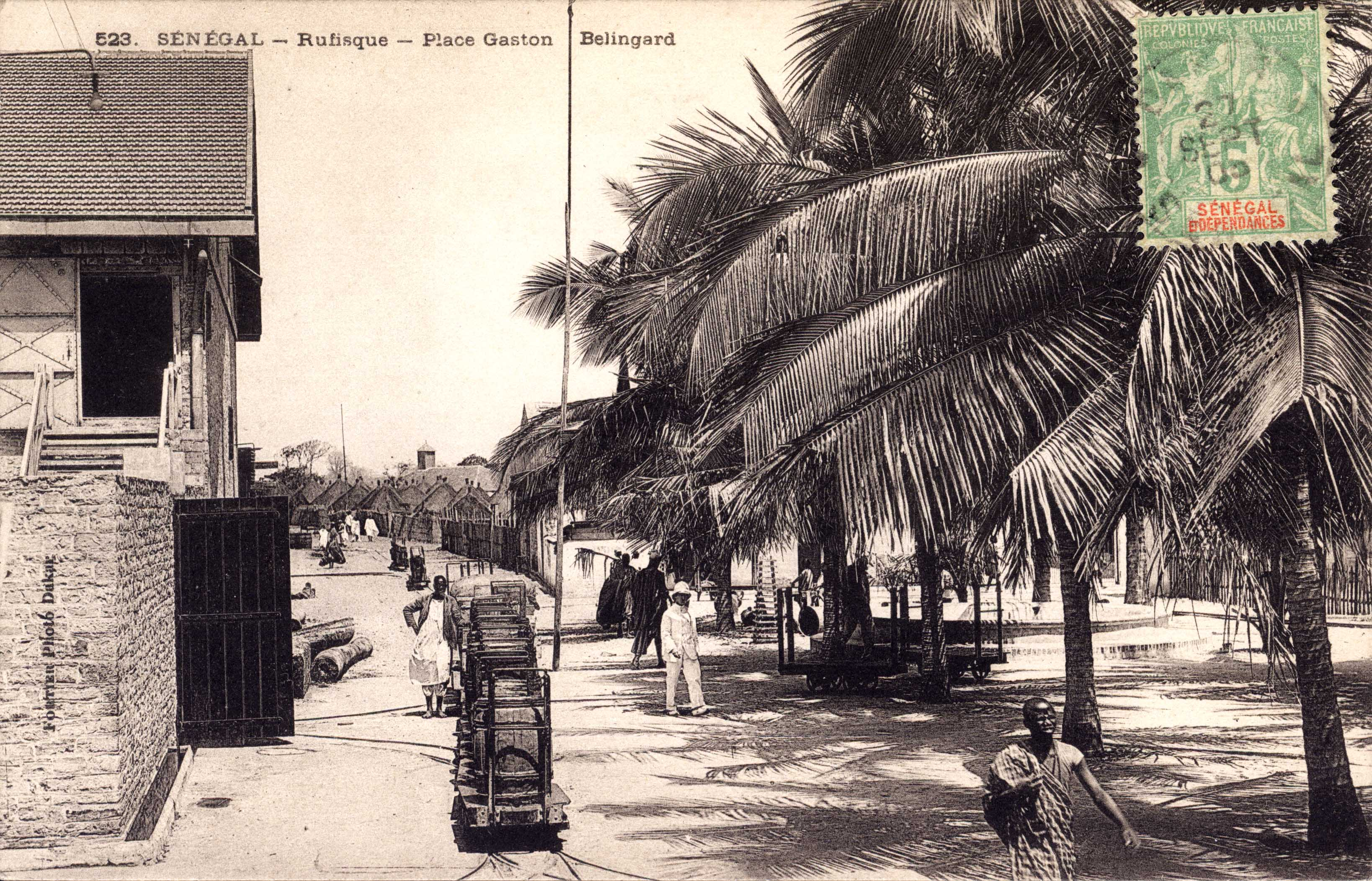
Place Gaston Belingard

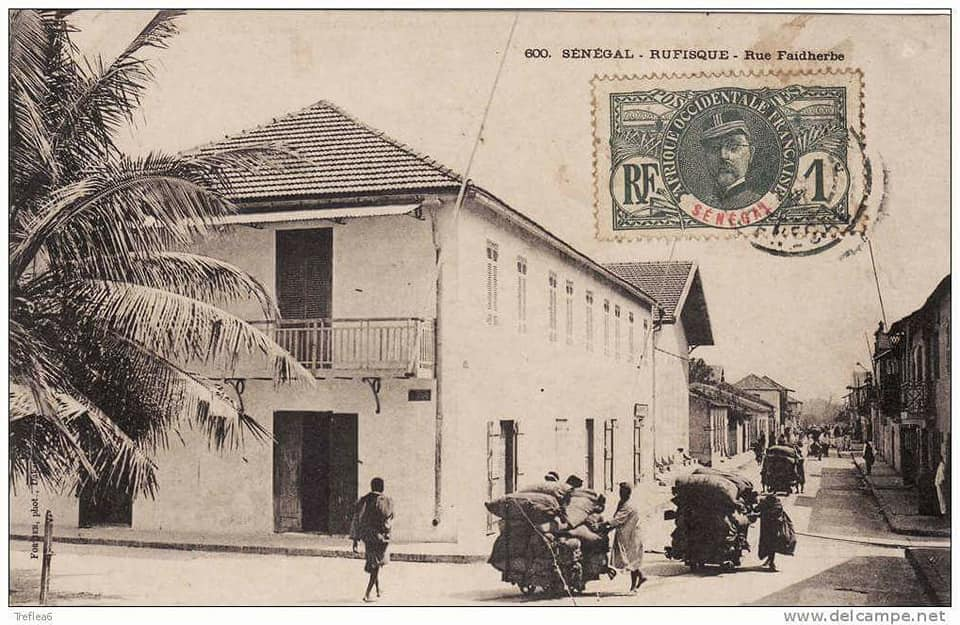
Rue Faidherbe

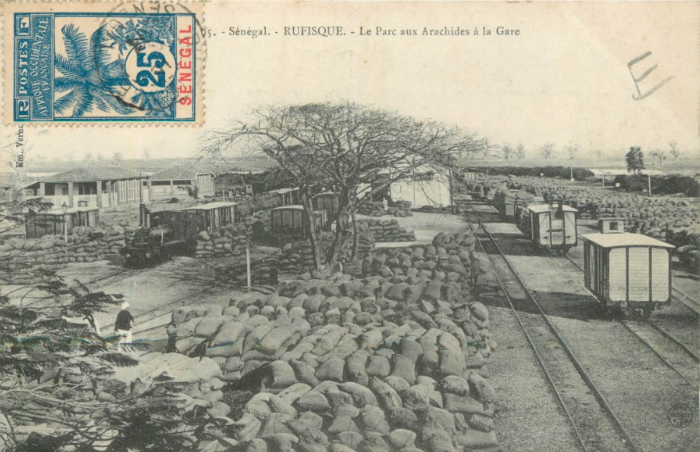
At right 400-mm-gauge Decauville at station
