= Ocampo Railway =

Railway line in Argentina

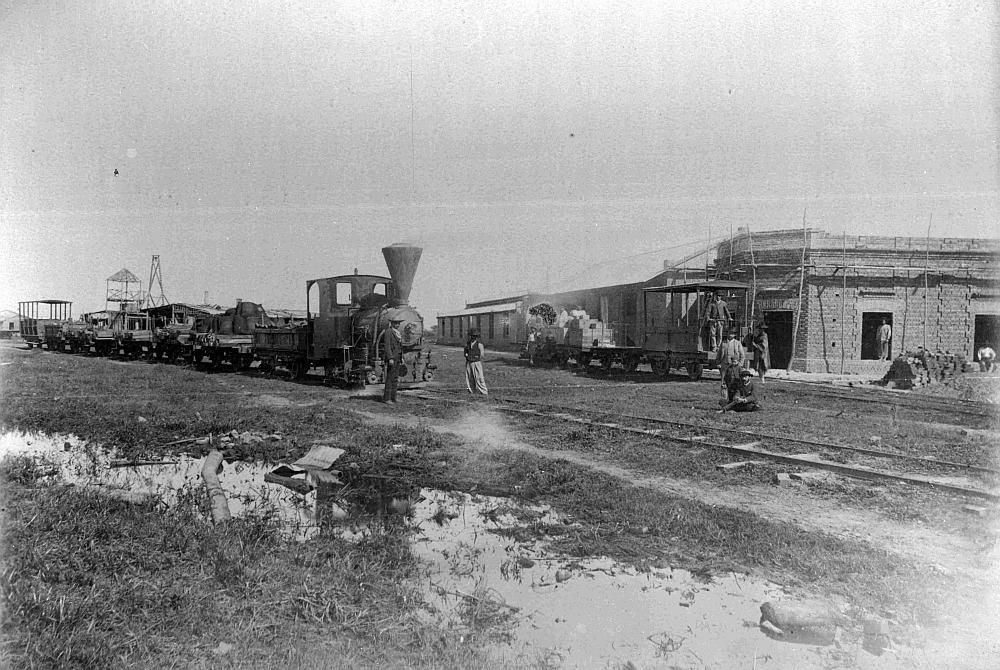
- Colonia Ocampo station C. 1887

Overview
- Native name: Ferrocarril Ocampo
- Status: Closed
- Termini: Los Tábanos; Puerto Ocampo

Service
- Operator(s): Manuel Ocampo (1884–1910); La Forestal (1910–1963)

History
- Opened: 1884
- Closed: c. 1963 (transferred to General Belgrano Railway)

Technical
- Line length: 40 km (25 mi)
- Track gauge: 1,000 mm (3 ft 3 3/8 in) metre gauge
Route map
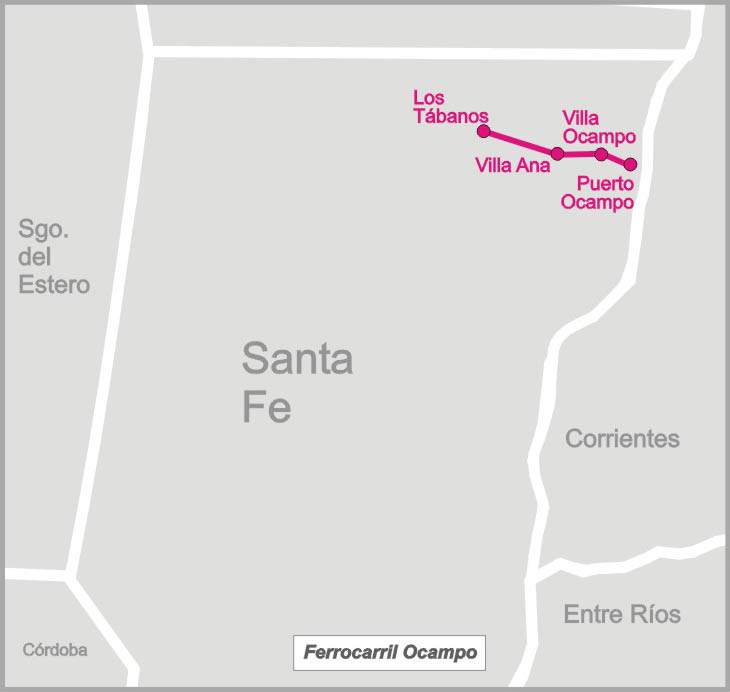

The Ocampo Railway, also called the first Chaco Railway and later La Forestal Railway, was the first railway of Villa Ocampo, of the North of Santa Fe and of the Gran Chaco Territory. It was 1,000 mm (3 ft 3 3/8 in) gauge and was opened on July 26, 1884. It was established by local settler Manuel Ocampo Samanés, who had also founded the city of Villa Ocampo (as "Colonia Ocampo") in 1878.

The railway line was strategically designed to join some of the city's industries such as the "Carlota" sawmill, the "Manolo Ocampo" sugar mill (later "Ingenio Arno") and the "Don Emilio" distillery, all around Villa Ocampo, to Puerto Ocampo, on an arm of the Paraná River called "Paraná Miní".

== Overview ==
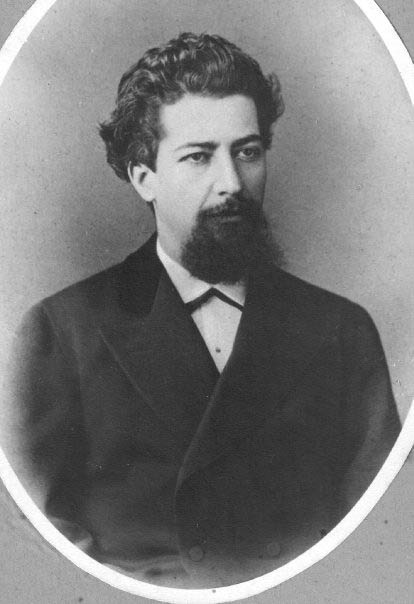
Manuel Ocampo Samanés, owner of the company that founded the railway

It was built with rolling stock brought from Germany, from the Decauville system. At first it was 25 km long from Villa Adela to Puerto San Vicente. Later, in 1910, it was transferred to the British-owned company La Forestal, which extended it to Villa Ana (the place where its tannin factory was located) to the west and to Puerto Ocampo, to the east. In this way it reached the Paraná River, covering several kilometers between islands and the flood valley with three large bridges, 27 minor ones and several culverts. It had three locomotives, three first class wagons, a dual carriageway and 60 flat wagons, it had four stations, warehouses for merchandise and a repair shop.

In its maximum extension, under the name of "FC La Forestal", it reached the station km 366 of the Branch F of the General Belgrano Railway, where today the town of Los Tábanos is located.

With the decline of the company in the 1960s, the railway line also declined, leaving few vestiges of it as such today. The disappearance of this railway also meant, for many years, the disconnection between Puerto San Vicente, on the Paraná Mini river, with Puerto Ocampo, on the Paraná. At present, its embankments are preserved for automotive transport.

After La Forestal ceased operations in Argentina, the railway line was transferred to the General Belgrano Railway.

== Gallery ==
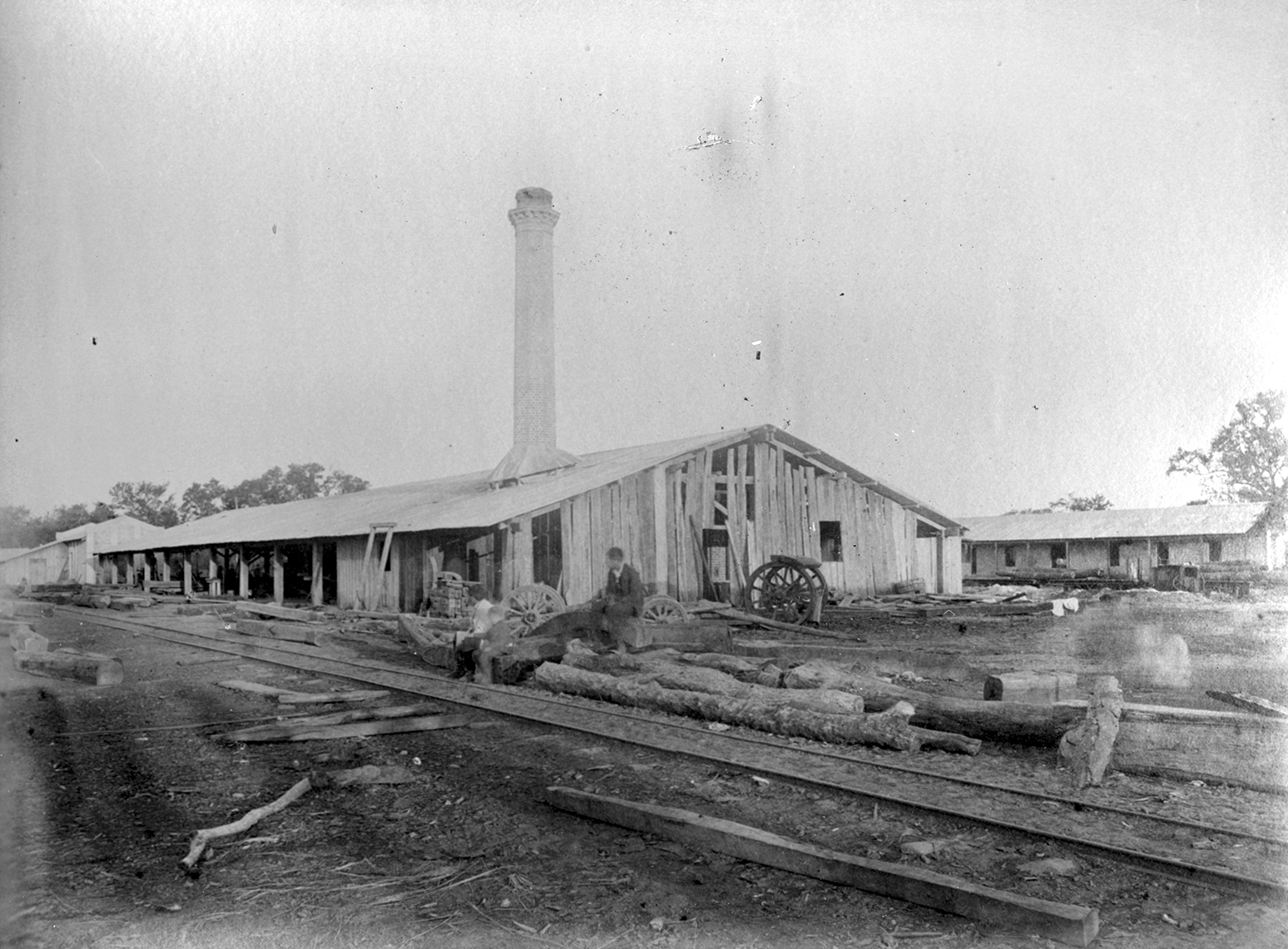
Carlota sawmill

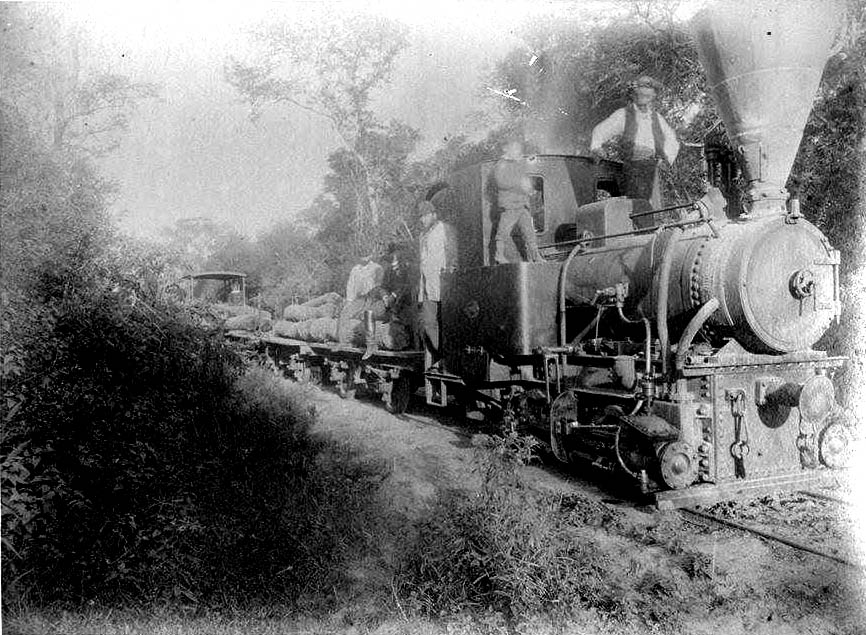
Train carrying trunks

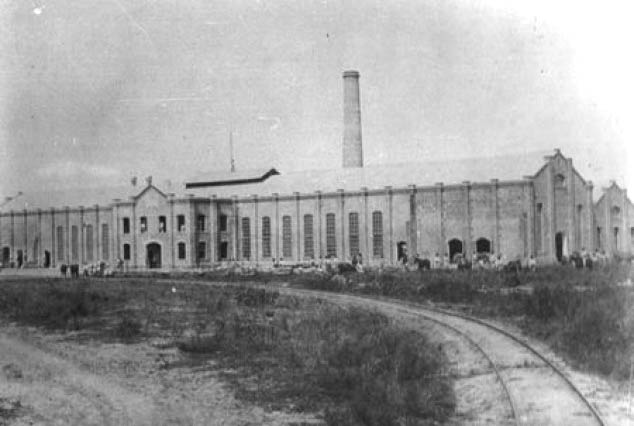
Manolo sugar mill

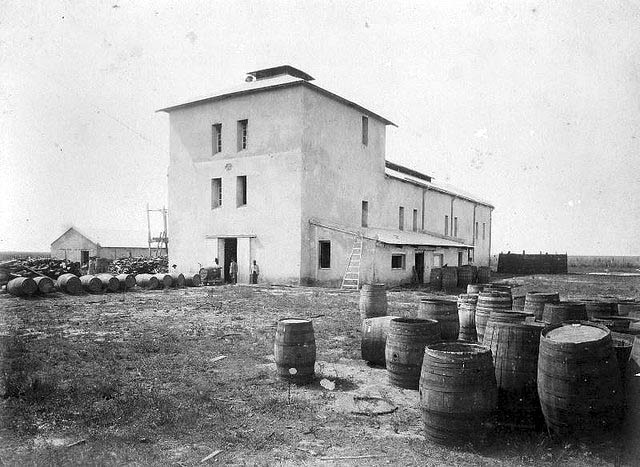
Don Emilio distillery

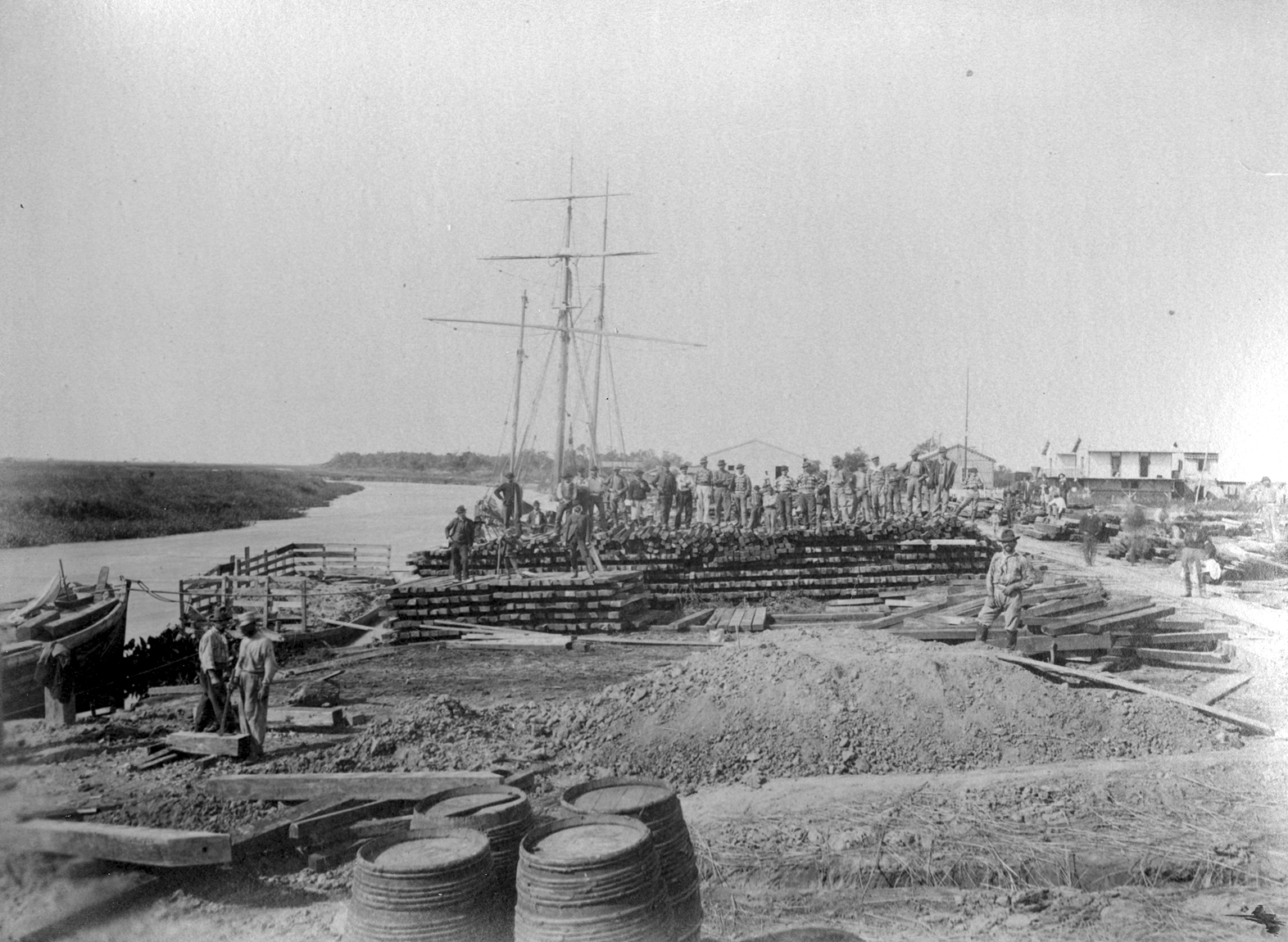
San Vicente port

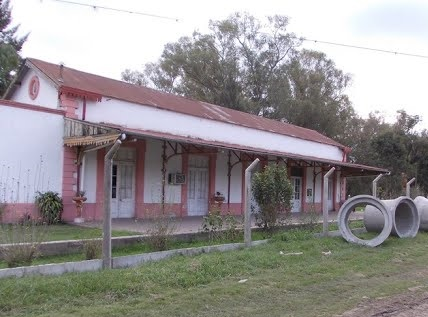
Villa Ocampo station in 2013
