= Decauville Railway of the Cobazet Estate =

Coordinates: 42.66733°N 2.24435°E

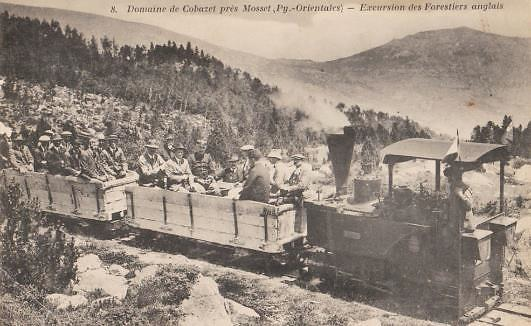
- Decauville 0-4-0 locomotive Stéatite

Overview
- Native name: Chemin de fer de la domaine de Cobazet

Technical
- Line length: 12 km (7.5 mi)
- Track gauge: 600 mm (1 ft 11 5/8 in)
Route map
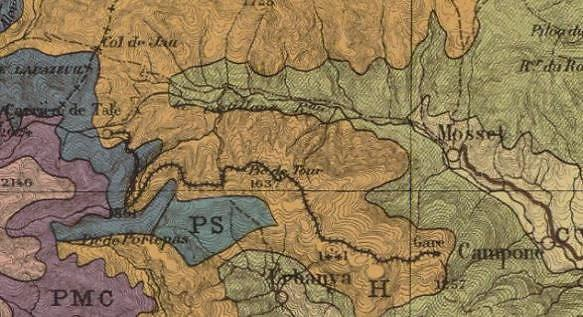
Route on an historic map

The Decauville Railway of the Cobazet Estate (French Chemin de fer de la domaine de Cobazet) was a 12 km (7.5 mi) long narrow-gauge railway with a gauge of 600 mm (1 ft 11 5/8 in) near Mosset in the Pyrénées-Orientales department in southern France.

== History ==
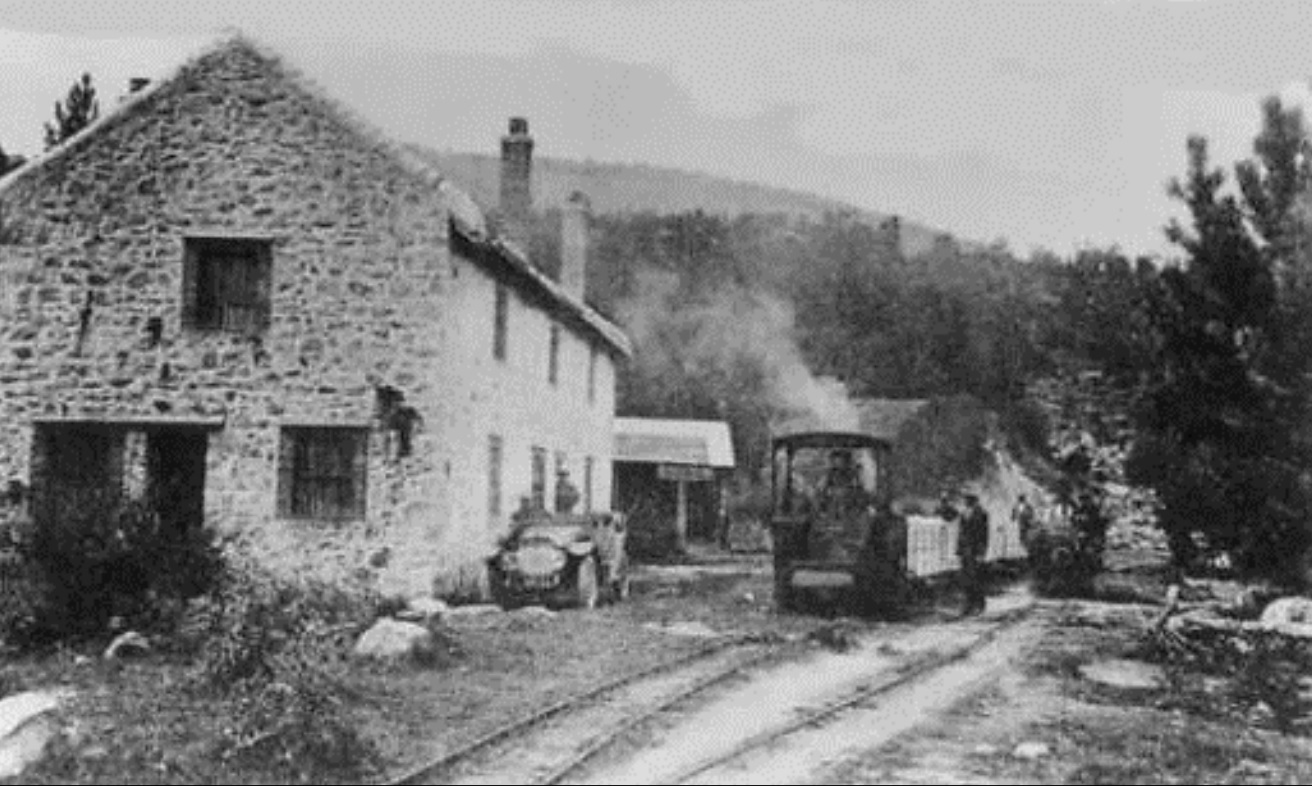
The quarry path came to the left of the building and went back in front after a tight loop

Baron Fernand Marie de Chefdebien-Zagarrira (1836-1914) acquired the Cobazet Estate at an auction in 1883. It was a very large estate with 1,851 hectares (4,570 acres) near Mosset. In addition to willows and pine, fir and beech forests, there was also a quarry above the Refuge de Caillau. There the foreman Remy Jacomy (1818-1889) had mined talc.

The Baron built a narrow-gauge railway to transport the talc-containing soapstone (French: Stéatite) from the quarry at an altitude of 1,600 metres (5,200 ft) to the Gare d'Estardé, the mountain station of an aerial tramway at an altitude of 1,220 metres (4,000 ft). In order to market the soapstone mined in the quarry, he converted it into talc at a chemical factory in Prades in Poudre Chefdebien, which was used to treat vine diseases.

== Track construction ==
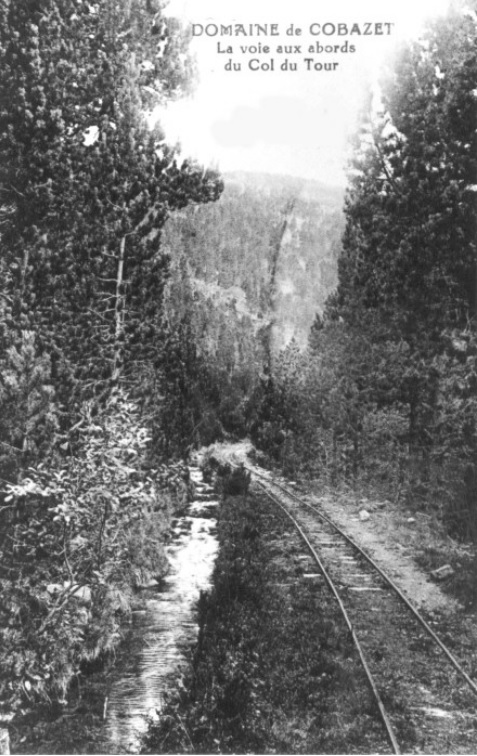
The route near the Col du Tour

The rails were each 6 metres (20 ft) long. They came from the Tamaris forge in Alès and were either straight or curved. The surveyor calculated the arches of the track so that their length was a multiple of 6 metres. The first rails were delivered in numbered packages at the end of September 1885, to make the assembly as easy as possible, just like with a Meccano set.

The first 330 metres (360 yd) of track were laid on 10 October 1885. After a winter-break caused by the first snowfall, laying the section from Caillauet to Canrec began on 14 May 1886. Only one bridge over the Còrrec de Canrec was necessary en route. The route was to reach Cobazet at a rate of 300 metres (330 yd) per day by 15 June 1886 at the latest, despite delays caused by heavy rainfall. On 19 June 1886 the route reached the Col des Vigues. However, due to the poor substructure, there were many derailments, so that the route had to be improved.

After the commissioning of an aerial cableway, with which the swap-bodies of the tipper wagons could be transported, the Decauville railway line was shortened to a length of 7 kilometres (4.3 mi). The Gare d'Estardé was taken out of service in 1916 and sold to the French army. The rest of the network was finally shut down around 1950, when lorries could be used for transport.

== Rolling stock ==
The Decauville locomotive Stéatite, which was bought by the Baron from a third party, found it difficult to pull the empty wagons uphill in the arid area. Funnel-shaped sand boxes attached to the rear of the driver's cab indicate that the locomotive's wheels often spun.

| No | Year | Type | Gauge | Empty weight | Loaded weight | Name | Comments |
|---|---|---|---|---|---|---|---|
| N° 412 | 1904 | 0-4-0 | 600 mm (1 ft 11 5/8 in) | 3.25 t | | Stéatite | Decauville steam locomotive, which belonged originally to Duncan Pingorial, later two other owners and finally to De Chefdebien & Cie, Mosset |
| N° 878, 880, 885, 889 & 918 | | | 600 mm (1 ft 11 5/8 in) | | | | Five tipper wagons |
| | | | 600 mm (1 ft 11 5/8 in) | | | | To goods wagons, which were also used for passenger transport |
| | ca 1913 | | 600 mm (1 ft 11 5/8 in) | | | | Bogies for transporting logs or wooden containers for transporting ore and passengers |

== Railway Modeling ==
An H0e model of the locomotive was commercially produced by Jouef in 1967.
