= Petite-Espinette =

Neighbourhood in Brussels, Belgium

Petite-Espinette: Petite-Espinette (French); Kleine Hut (Dutch)
- Neighbourhood
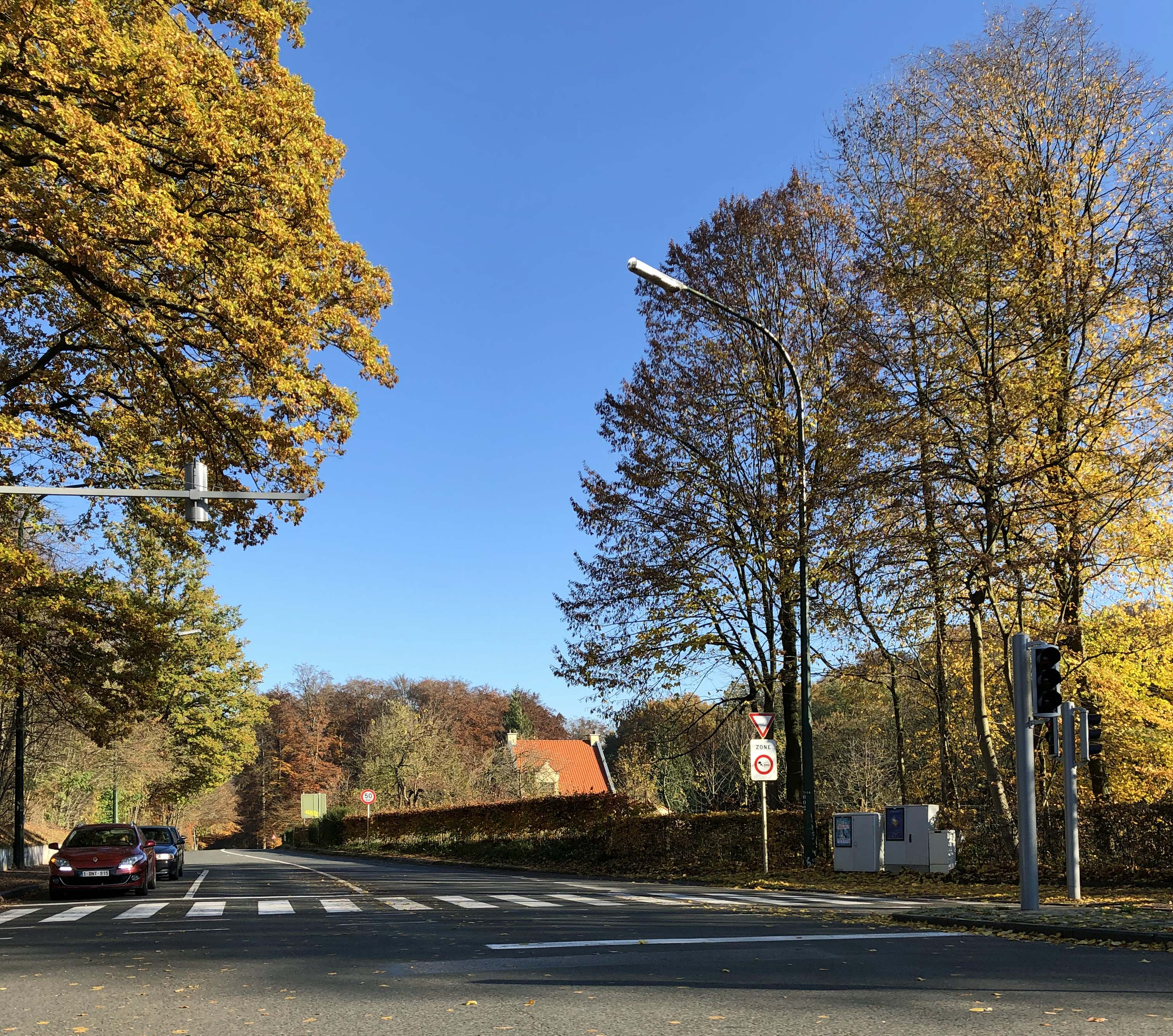
- Junction of the Chaussée de Waterloo/Waterloosesteenweg and the Drève Saint-Hubert/Sint-Hubertusdreef in the Sonian Forest, near the border with Sint-Genesius-Rode.

- Location within Brussels Petite-Espinette (Belgium)
- Coordinates: 50°46′10.2918″N 4°22′57.9004″E
- Country: Belgium
- Region: Brussels-Capital Region
- Arrondissement: Brussels-Capital
- Municipality: Uccle
- Named for: Hunting cabin
- Time zone: UTC+1 (CET)
  - Summer (DST): UTC+2 (CEST)
- Postal code: 1180
- Area codes: 02

Petite-Espinette (French, pronounced [pətˈit-ɛspinˈɛt]) or Kleine Hut (Dutch, pronounced [ˈklaɪnə hʊt]), is a district of Uccle, a municipality of Brussels, Belgium. Located in the south of Uccle, along the Chaussée de Waterloo/Waterloosesteenweg at the level of the Drève Saint-Hubert/Sint-Hubertusdreef on the border with Sint-Genesius-Rode.

== Toponymy ==
The name has been in use for several centuries and appears on historical maps, such as the Ferraris map from the late 18th century. It is found written both as Petite-Espinette and Petite Espinette. The Dutch name, Kleine Hut ("small hut"), likely refers to a small wooden house with a tiled roof. Conversely, the French-speaking inhabitants of Waterloo and Braine-l'Alleud observed mainly thorny bushes (espinettes) along the route, which influenced the French designation. It remains uncertain which name predates the other, although both have been established for centuries.

== History ==
In the 15th century, there was an inn called Saint-Hubert. It was destroyed in the 18th century following a legal dispute.

The area also became notable as the terminus of Line W line operated by the National Company of Light Railways. This tram line, inaugurated in 1894, was the SNCV's first electrified route and primarily served to transport city dwellers to the outskirts of the Sonian Forest for leisure purposes. The line was later extended towards Waterloo, Braine-l'Alleud, and Wavre.

As of 2018, Petite-Espinette continues to serve as the name of a bus stop connecting Brussels with Waterloo and Braine-l'Alleud. In contemporary Dutch usage, Kleine Hut also denotes the nearby shopping area situated along the Chaussée de Waterloo, at the border between Uccle and Rhode-Saint-Genèse. This area is renowned for its boutiques and restaurants and is regarded as a prestigious suburban neighbourhood.
