= List of secondary, industrial and Decauville railways in Argentina =

The list of secondary, industrial and Decauville railways in Argentina includes narrow-gauge railway lines that operated in Argentina, which used tracks, sleepers, or vehicles manufactured by French company Decauville. The vast majority of those lines were freight services, although in some cases (such as the Ostende railway or the Yerba Buena Steam Tram) also ran passenger services.

Name	Local name	Province	Length	Gauge	Further information
Agricultural Light Railways (Note: Part of the Buenos Aires Great Southern Railway.)	Ferrocarriles Ligeros de Agricultura	Buenos Aires (Note: Headquartered in River Plate House, Finsbury Circus, London E.C. 2.)	total 373.36 km, main 302.55 km, sidings 70.81 km	600 mm (1 ft 11 5/8 in)	Locomotives—27, passenger cars—5, freight cars—1422. Capitalization 3,201,640 pesos (invested).
Aguilares Mill Branch Railway	Ferrocarril Ramal Ingenio Aguilares	Tucumán	8 km	600 mm (1 ft 11 5/8 in)	Transport of sugar cane
Cia. Argentina de Quebracho Railway	Ferrocarril Cía. Argentina de Quebracho	Formosa	37 km	600 mm (1 ft 11 5/8 in)	General transport service (local); passengers (main)
Argentine Hardwoods and Land Co. and Argentine Timber and Estates Co. Railway	?	Buenos Aires			(1936 in receivership, affairs in charge of Deloitte, Griffith & Co.).
Argentine Salt Works Railway	Ferrocarril La Salinera Argentina	Buenos Aires	32.18 km	750 mm (2 ft 5 1/2 in)	Locomotives—3, passenger cars—1, freight cars—10. Capitalization 176,000 pesos (invested)
Bancalari Mill Railway	Ferrocarril del Molino Bancalari	Buenos Aires (Note: Pilar Partido.)	5.4 km	600 mm (1 ft 11 5/8 in)	Transport of milk cans from nearby dairy farms to Manzanares.
Bella Vista Sugar Co. Mill Branch Railway	Desvío FFCC Ingenio Cía. Azucarera Bella Vista	Tucumán	12.737 km	1,000 mm (3 ft 3 3/8 in) metre gauge	Transport of sugar cane
Bellani and Pensa Co. Railway	Ferrocarril Cia Bellani y Pensa	Buenos Aires	11.26 km	1,000 mm (3 ft 3 3/8 in)	Locomotives—1, freight cars—2. Capitalization 44,000 pesos (invested).
Bourdichone and Company Branch Railway	FFCC Desvio Bourdichone y Cia	Córdoba	3.2 km	600 mm (1 ft 11 5/8 in)	Transport of limestone.
Buenos Aires Western Railway	Ferrocarril Oeste de Buenos Aires	Buenos Aires (Note: Headquartered in River Plate House, 10 Finsbury Circus, London, E.C. 2.; local offices in Plaza Once, Buenos Aires.)	11.070 km	500 mm (19 3/4 in): (2.5 km); 600 mm (1 ft 11 5/8 in): (5 km); 750 mm (2 ft 5 1/2 in): (1.1 km); 1,000 mm (3 ft 3 3/8 in): (2.5 km)	
Cabezas Railway	Ferrocarril A. Cabezas	Santiago del Estero	47 km	600 mm (1 ft 11 5/8 in)	Transport of forest products
Castiglioni Railway	Ferrocarril Castiglioni	Santiago del Estero	58 km	600 mm (1 ft 11 5/8 in)	Transport of forest and miscellaneous products
Central Chubut Railway	Ferrocarril Central del Chubut	Chubut		Initially 1,000 mm (3 ft 3 3/8 in), later 750 mm (2 ft 5 1/2 in)	1888–1958
Compagno Hnos Railway	Ferrocarril Compagno Hnos.	Santiago del Estero (Note: Offices in Buenos Aires, at Florida 440.)	50 km	600 mm (1 ft 11 5/8 in)	Transport of forest products
Concepción Sugar Company Mill Railway	Ferrocarril Ingenio Cia. Azucarera Concepción	Tucumán (Note: Offices in Buenos Aires at Reconquista 730)	52 km	600 mm (1 ft 11 5/8 in)	Locomotives—12, freight cars—370. Capitalization 350,000 pesos (invested). Transport of sugar cane
Cordoba Central Railway	Ferroccarril Central de Cordoba	Santiago del Estero, Tucumán, Catamarca (Note: Offices at Estacion Retiro, Buenos Aires (local); River Plate House, Finsbury Circus, London, E.C.2.)	173 km	1,000 mm (3 ft 3 3/8 in)	
Corrientes Economic Railway	Ferrocarril Económico Correntino (Note: Operated by "Banco Francés")	Corrientes (Note: Head offices at San Martín 2270, Corrientes.)	226 km	600 mm (1 ft 11 5/8 in)	Locomotives—3, passenger cars—11, freight cars—230. Weight of rail: 12 and 18 kg/m. Capitalization 2,200,000 pesos (invested).
Damiani Branch Railway	Ferrocarril Ramal Damiani	Chaco	12 km	1,000 mm (3 ft 3 3/8 in)	Transports of forest products and other products
Deffilipi (Valle Hermoso) Branch Railway	Ferrocarril Ramal Deffilipi (Valle Heroso)	Córdoba	10.6 km	600 mm (1 ft 11 5/8 in): (5 km); 1,000 mm (3 ft 3 3/8 in): (5.6 km)	Transport of limestone and lime
Demartini Branch Railway	Ferrocarril Ramal Demartini	Santiago del Estero	62 km	750 mm (2 ft 5 1/2 in)	Transport of forest products
Depietri Railways and Elevators	Ferrocarriles y Elevadores Depietri	Buenos Aires	68 km	1,000 mm (3 ft 3 3/8 in)	Transport of grain
Donadeu Railway	Ferrocarril Donadeu	Santiago de Estero	60 km	600 mm (1 ft 11 5/8 in)	Transport of forest products
El Dorado Railway	Ferrocarril El Dorado	Santiago del Estero	46 km	600 mm (1 ft 11 5/8 in)	Transport of forest products
Enrique S. Perez Branch Railway	Ferrocarril Ramal Enrique S. Perez	Santiago del Estero	15.7 km	600 mm (1 ft 11 5/8 in)	Transport of forest products
Estancia Guaycolec Railway	Ferrocarril Estencia Guaycolec	Formosa	35 km	600 mm (1 ft 11 5/8 in)	General transport services
M. Flores Branch Railway	Ferrocarril Ramal M. Flores	Jujuy	7 km	600 mm (1 ft 11 5/8 in)	Transport of forest products
Fontana Co. Ltd. (Rio Araza) Railway	Ferrocarril Fontana Ltda. Rio Araza	Chaco	3 km	1,000 mm (3 ft 3 3/8 in)	Transport of forest products
The Forestal Land, Timber & Railway Co. (Note: Local offices at Paseo Colón 185, Buenos Aires; headquarters at 149 Leadenhall Street, London.) (Note: Formerly known as the Ocampo Railway, opened in 1884 by Manuel Ocampo and operated by him until 1910, when it was taken over by La Forestal.)	La Forestal	Chaco	698 km (Note: Included 61 km in Chaco territory.)	1,000 mm (3 ft 3 3/8 in): (271 km); 750 mm (2 ft 5 1/2 in): (243 km); 600 mm (1 ft 11 5/8 in): (117 km)	Locomotives—40, passenger cars—16, freight cars–735. Weight of rail: varies from 8 kg/m to 32 kg/m. Capitalization £5,574,689.
General L. Winter to Coresa Railway	Ferrocarril de General Lorenzo Vintter a Conesa (Note: Branch of the Argentine State Railway.)	Río Negro	77 km	750 mm (2 ft 5 1/2 in)	
Gronda and Company Branch Railway	Ferrocarril Ramal Gronda y Cia.	Jujuy	12 km	600 mm (1 ft 11 5/8 in)	Diverse services
Granadera y Forestal Railway	Ferrocarril Ganadero y Forestal	Chaco	60 km	750 mm (2 ft 5 1/2 in)	Transport of forest products
Hardcastle Branch Railway	Ferrocarril Ramal Hardcastle	Jujuy	10 km	600 mm (1 ft 11 5/8 in)	Diverse services
Industrial and Forestal de Yuto Railway	Ferrocarril Ramal Industrial y Forestal de Yuto	Jujuy	26 km	750 mm (2 ft 5 1/2 in)	Transport of forest products
Juan Arronga Branch Railway	Ferrocarril Ramal Juan Arronga	Santa Fe	17 km	1,000 mm (3 ft 3 3/8 in)	Transport of forest products
La Baviera Mill Railway	Ferrocarril Ramal Ingenio La Baviere	Tucumán	32 km	750 mm (2 ft 5 1/2 in)	Transport of sugar cane
La Calera Establishment Branch Railway	Ferrocarril Ramal Establecimiento La Calera	Córdoba	11 km	600 mm (1 ft 11 5/8 in)	Transport of limestone
La Esperanza Railway	Ferrocarril La Esperenza	Salta	81 km	600 mm (1 ft 11 5/8 in)	Transport of sugar cane
La Florida Hill French Railway	Ferrocarril Ingenio La Florida	Tucumán	12 km	750 mm (2 ft 5 1/2 in)	Transport of sugar cane
La Forestal Ltd. (Cotelay) Branch Railway	Ferrocarril Ramal La Forestal (Cotelay)	Chaco	24.5 km	1,000 mm (3 ft 3 3/8 in)	Transport of forest products
La Forestal Ltda. Haumonia al N.O. Branch Railway	Ferrocarril Ramal La Forestal Ltda. (Haumonia al N.O.)	Chaco	37 km	1,000 mm (3 ft 3 3/8 in)	Common carrier
La Mendieta Branch Railway	Ferrocarril Ramal La Mendieta	Jujuy	24.4 km	600 mm (1 ft 11 5/8 in)	Locomotives—6, freight cars—535, Capitalization 168,930 pesos (invested). Transport of sugar cane
La Papelera Argentina (S.A.) Branch Railway	Ferrocarril Ramal La Paperera Argentina (S.A.)	Santa Fe	4.313 km	600 mm (1 ft 11 5/8 in)	Transport of forest products
La Providencia Mill Branch Railway	Ferrocarril Ramal Ingenio La Providencia	Tucumán	18 km	600 mm (1 ft 11 5/8 in)	Transports of sugar cane
La Vicuna Industrial Branch Railway	Ferrocarril Ramal Cia. La Industrial	Chaco	12 km	1,000 mm (3 ft 3 3/8 in)	Transport of forest products
Las Selvad del Chaco Branch Railway	Ferrocarril Ramal Las Selvas del Chaco	Chaco	15 km	1,000 mm (3 ft 3 3/8 in)	Transport of forest products
Ledesma Mill Railway	Ferrocarril Ingenio Ledesma	Jujuy (Note: Head offices at Sarmiento 459, Buenos Aires.)	133 km	700 mm (2 ft 3 9/16 in): (97 km); 508 mm (20 in): (86 km)	Transport of sugar cane
Los Ralos Mill Branch Railway	Ferrocarril Ramal Ingenio Los Ralos	Tucumán	6 km	600 mm (1 ft 11 5/8 in)	Weight of rail: 12 kg/m. Locomotives—3, freight cars—65. Transport of sugar cane.
Malagueno Branch Railway	Ferrocarril Ramal Malagueno	Córdoba	5 km	600 mm (1 ft 11 5/8 in)	Transport of limestone
Mendoza Industrial Branch Railway	Ferrocarril Ramal Industrial de Mendoza	Mendoza	18 km	750 mm (2 ft 5 1/2 in)	Diverse services
Minetti Branch Railway	Ferrocarril Ramal Minetti	Córdoba	3.5 km	600 mm (1 ft 11 5/8 in)	Transport of lime stone
Mualen Branch Railway	Ferrocarril Ramal Mualen	Chaco (Note: Offices in Tenco 184, Buenos Aires)	12 km	1,000 mm (3 ft 3 3/8 in)	Locomotives—4, freight cars—63. Diverse services.
Noetinger and Lepetit Branch Railway	Ferrocarril Ramal Noetinger y Lepetit	Chaco	2.4 km	1,000 mm (3 ft 3 3/8 in)	Transport of forest products
Old Patagonian Express	Viejo Expreso Patagónico or La Trochita	Río Negro, Chubut		750 mm (2 ft 5 1/2 in)	
Ostende Branch Railway (Note: Line from Colonia Tokio – beach of Ostende.)	Ferrocarril Ramal Ostende	Buenos Aires	3 km	?	Transport of goods and passenger (touristic service)
Padilla Hnos. Railway	Ferrocarril Ramal Padilla Hnos.	Tucumán	24 km	750 mm (2 ft 5 1/2 in)	Weight of rail: 12 kg/m. Locomotives—4, freight cars—150. Transport of sugar cane
Pedro Gasparetti Branch Railway	Ferrocarril Ramal Pedro Gagnaretti	Santa Fe	12 km	1,000 mm (3 ft 3 3/8 in)	Transport of forest products
H. Pemberton Branch Railway	Ferrocarril Ramal F. Pemberton	Jujuy	7 km	600 mm (1 ft 11 5/8 in)	Transport of forest products
Península Valdés Railway	Ferrocarril de Península Valdés	Chubut	32 km	760 mm (2 ft 5 15/16 in)	1901 - 1920 commuter rail
Provincial Government Branch Railway	Ferrocarril Ramal Gobierno de la Provincia	Tucumán	12 km	750 mm (2 ft 5 1/2 in)	Transport of passengers
Puerto Ocampo Railway	Ferrocarril Ramal Puerto Ocampo	Santa Fe	53 km	1,000 mm (3 ft 3 3/8 in)	General transport service
Pte. R. Saenz Pena to Castelli Railway	Ferrocarril de Pte. R. Saenz Pena a Casteli	Chaco		750 mm (2 ft 5 1/2 in)	
Quebrachales Fusionados S.A. Railway	Ferrocarril Quebracholes Fusionados S.A.	Chaco (Note: Offices in Paseo Colon 185, Buenos Aires)	95 km	1,000 mm (3 ft 3 3/8 in): (30 km); 600 mm (1 ft 11 5/8 in): (65 km)	Locomotives—6, passenger cars—5, freight cars—35. Weight of rail: 3, 10, 12 kg/m in sections of 7 meters. General transport service
Rainforest Ecological Train	Tren Ecológico de la Selva	Misiones (Note: In Iguazu Falls region.)	7 km	600 mm (1 ft 11 5/8 in)	Opened in 1995
Rural de Resistencia Railway	Ferrocarril Rural de Resistencia	Chaco	30 km	750 mm (2 ft 5 1/2 in)	Capitalization (invested) 70,400 pesos. Locomotives—6, passenger cars—5, freight cars—35. General transport services
San Isidro Branch Railway	Ferrocarril Ramal San Isidro	Salta	15 km	600 mm (1 ft 11 5/8 in)	Transport of sugar cane
San Martin Mill Railway	Ferrocarril Ramal Ingenio San Martin	Salta (Note: Offices in Defensa 113, Buenos Aires)	107 km	600 mm (1 ft 11 5/8 in)	Transport of sugar cane
San Pablo Sugar Mill Branch Railway	Ferrocarril Ramal Ingenio San Pablo	Tucumán (Note: Offices in Sarmiento 385, Buenos Aires.)	11 km	1,000 mm (3 ft 3 3/8 in)	Locomotives—1, freight cars—8. Weight of rail: 10 kg/m. Transport of sugar cane
Santa Lucía Mill Branch Railway	Ferrocarril Ramal Ingenio Santa Lucía	Tucumán	17 km	1,000 mm (3 ft 3 3/8 in)	Transport of sugar cane
Southern Fuegian Railway	Ferrocarril Austral Fueguino	Tierra del Fuego	7 km	500 mm (19 3/4 in)	Opened in 1909, closed in 1952, reopened in 1994
BA Great Southern Railway	Ferrocarril del Sud	Buenos Aires (Note: Local offices in Constitución, Buenos Aires; headquarters at River Plate House, Finsbury Circus, London, E.C.2., UK.)	total 373.05 km:Main 302.55 km Sidings 70.81 km	600 mm (1 ft 11 5/8 in)	Locomotives—27, passenger cars—5, freight cars—1422. Capitalization (invested) 3,201,640 pesos.
C. B. Svensen Railway	Ferrocarril C. B. Svensen	Chaco	29 km	1,000 mm (3 ft 3 3/8 in): (21 km); 600 mm (1 ft 11 5/8 in): (8 km)	Transport of forest products
G. Weisburd Branch Railway	Ferrocarril Ramal G. Weisburd	Chaco	11 km	600 mm (1 ft 11 5/8 in)	Transport of forest products
Weisburd Branch Railway	Ferrocarril Ramal Weisburd	Santiago del Estero	51 km	1,000 mm (3 ft 3 3/8 in)	Transport of forest products
Yerba Buena Steam Tram	Tranvía a Vapor de Yerba Buena	Tucumán	12 km	600 mm (1 ft 11 5/8 in)	Passenger service, operated 1916–26
Zuberbühler Railway	Ferrocarril Zuberbühler	Chaco	94 km	1,000 mm (3 ft 3 3/8 in): (25 km); 600 mm (1 ft 11 5/8 in): (69 km)	Transport of forest products
