= Stoomtram Walcheren =

Dutch steam tram (1906–1937)

The Stoomtram Walcheren was a 3 ft 6 in (1,067 mm) gauge steam tram that operated between Vlissingen and Domburg in the Netherlands, with a branch line from Koudekerke (where the depot was) to Middelburg. The tramway opened in 1906 and was closed in 1937, being replaced by bus services operated by the SW company, which changed its name to Streekvervoer Walcheren. The track was lifted but completely relaid by the German army during the occupation to aid the construction of defensive positions.

The line was operated by a single class of five 0-4-0 enclosed Hohenzollern steam locomotives. Coaches were supplied by Allan in their usual style but were the longest in the Netherlands. Goods stock was also by Allan.

Some signs of the old line survive. The Director's House and enginemens' cottages in Koudekerke still stand as well as the station building; there is also a Tramstraat. The bus station in Middelburg is on the site of the loop and quayside sidings. The Tramzicht cafe in Domburg overlooks the site of the former terminus in Stationsstraat. No rolling stock survives.

== See also ==
- Narrow-gauge railways in the Netherlands
