= Domburg-Buiten =

Coordinates: 51.5478°N 3.4858°E

Domburg-Buiten is a former municipality in the Dutch province of Zeeland. It existed until 1816, when it merged with Domburg-Binnen to form the new municipality of Domburg.

The municipality of Domburg-Buiten covered the countryside of Domburg. The area did not include any villages or hamlets; in the middle of the 19th century, there were about 140 inhabitants.
