= Narrow-gauge railways in the Netherlands =

Numerous industrial narrow-gauge lines were built for peat extraction, clay extraction for brickworks and construction sites. The dominant gauge for industrial lines was 700 mm (2 ft 3 9/16 in), contrary to the 600 mm (1 ft 11 5/8 in) gauge used in neighbouring countries.

Nowadays, much of this industrial rail heritage is preserved in museums or in theme parks, such as the Efteling Steam Train Company.

The majority of the Dutch narrow-gauge railways were built as steam tram networks, predominantly with 750 mm (2 ft 5 1/2 in) and 1,067 mm (3 ft 6 in) track gauge.

== Tram ==
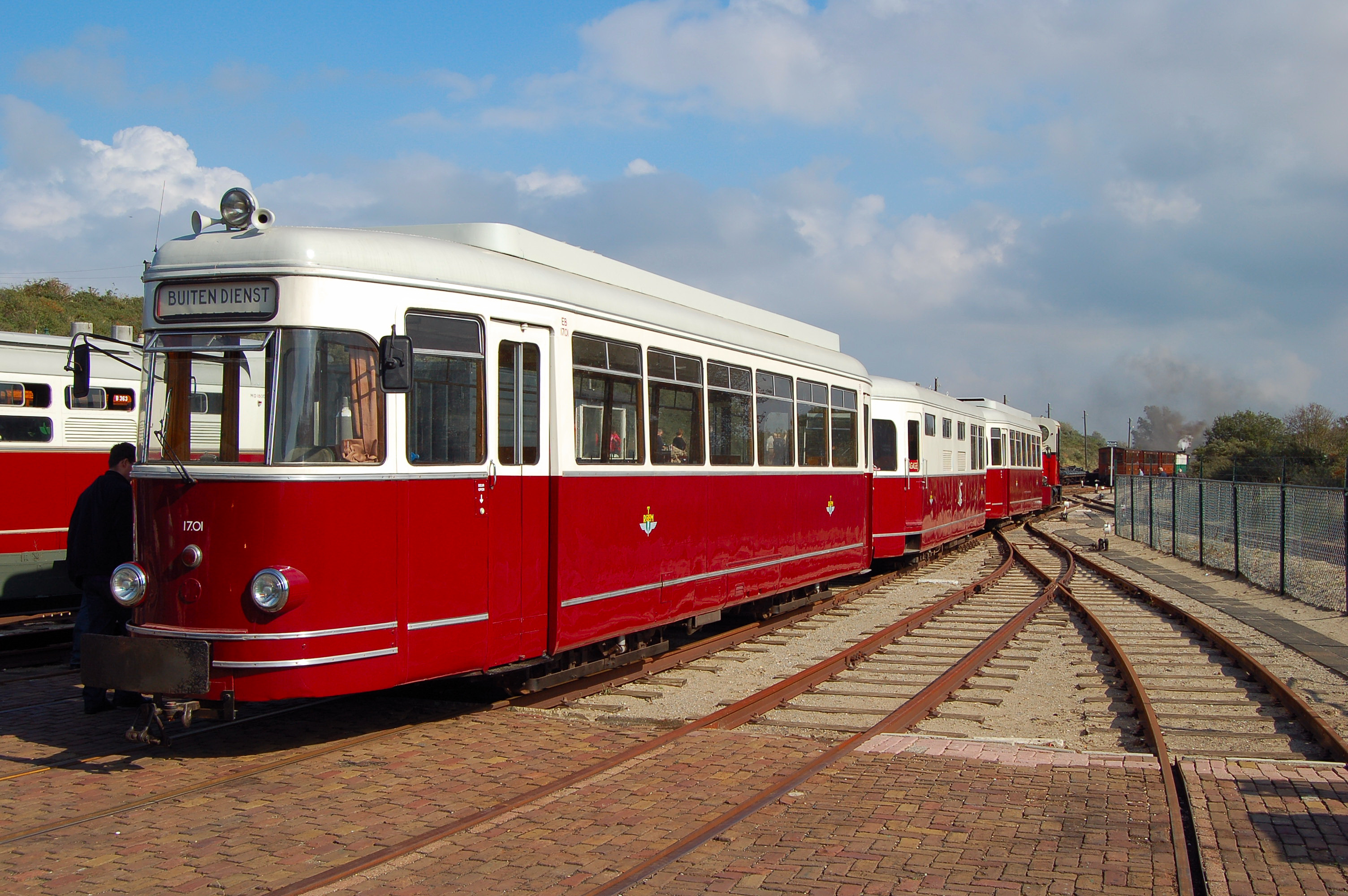
Diesel-electric tram of the Rotterdamse Tramweg Maatschappij, MBD 1700 EB 1701-1702 "Sperwer"

- Geldersch-Westfaalsche Stoomtram-Maatschappij; 750 mm (2 ft 5 1/2 in)
- Geldersche Stoomtramweg Maatschappij; 750 mm (2 ft 5 1/2 in)
- Rotterdamse Tramweg Maatschappij; 1,067 mm (3 ft 6 in)
- Stoomtram Walcheren; 1,067 mm (3 ft 6 in)
- Tramweg Maatschappij De Graafschap; 750 mm (2 ft 5 1/2 in)
- Tramweg Maatschappij Zutphen-Emmerik; 750 mm (2 ft 5 1/2 in)
- Tramweg Onderneming Gouda-Bodegraven; 750 mm (2 ft 5 1/2 in)

== Narrow-gauge heritage railways ==
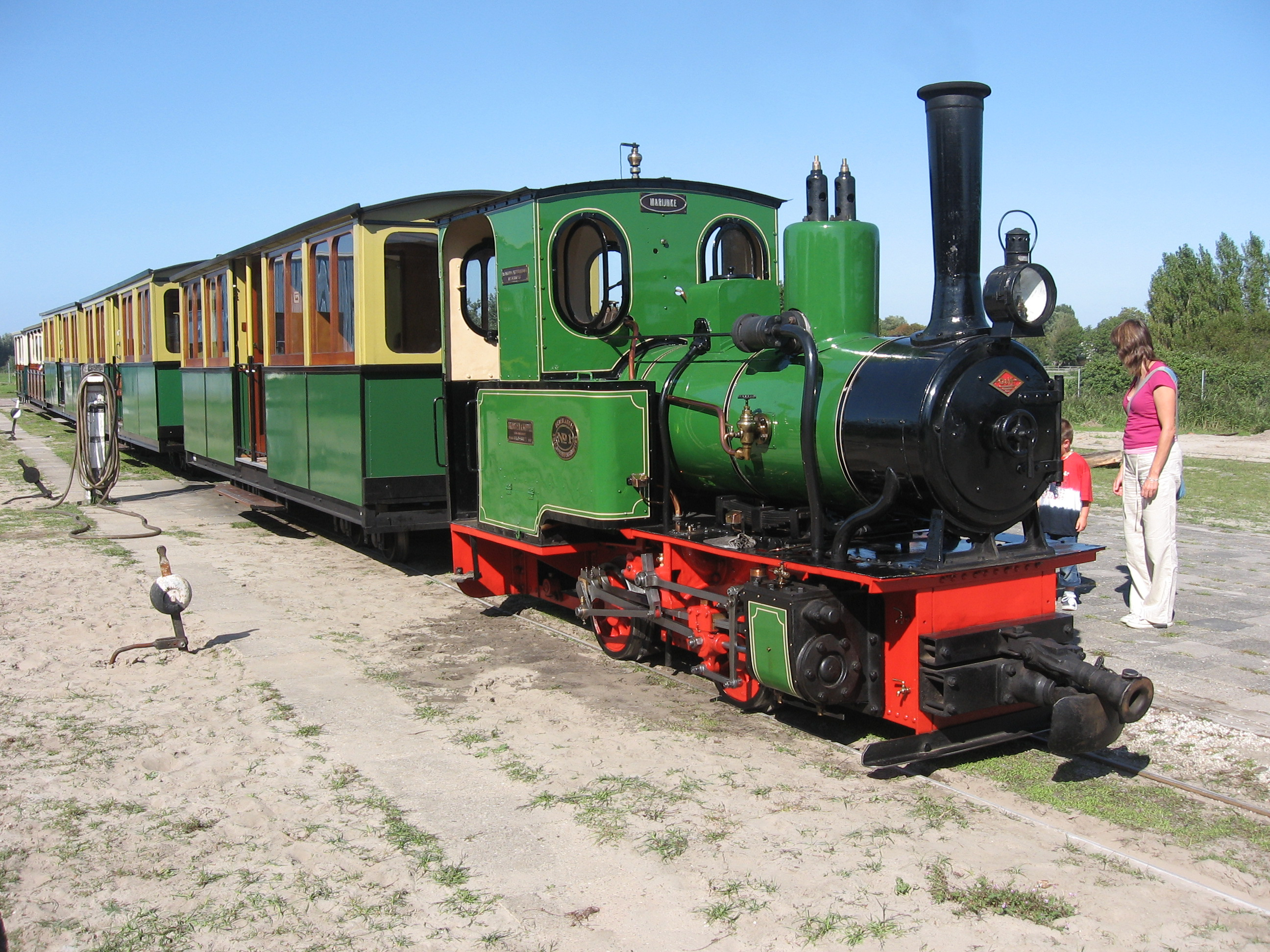
Narrow-gauge steam locomotive 1 'Marijnke' of the Stoomtrein Valkenburgse Meer

- Amsteltrein; 600 mm (1 ft 11 5/8 in), 3,7 km, park railway
- Decauville Spoorweg Museum (Permanently closed in 2014)); 1,2 km 600 mm (1 ft 11 5/8 in) and 400 mm (15 3/4 in) running line and 350 mm (13 25/32 in), 400 mm (15 3/4 in), 500 mm (19 3/4 in), 550 mm (21 21/32 in), 580 mm (22 27/32 in), 600 mm (1 ft 11 5/8 in), 700 mm (2 ft 3 9/16 in), 750 mm (2 ft 5 1/2 in), 900 mm (2 ft 11 7/16 in), 1,000 mm (3 ft 3 3/8 in) metre gauge and 1,200 mm (3 ft 11 1/4 in) collection, mainly focused on (Decauville) field railways.
- Eerste Drentse vereniging van Stoomliefhebbers in the peat heritage museum in Barger-Compascuum; 4 km, 700 mm (2 ft 3 9/16 in).
- Efteling Steam Train Company, 600 mm (1 ft 11 5/8 in), amusement park
- Gelderse Smalspoor Stichting; 700 mm (2 ft 3 9/16 in), brickworks
- Industrieel Smalspoor Museum; 900 mm (2 ft 11 7/16 in), a former peat railway
- Stichting Rijssens Leemspoor; 600 mm (1 ft 11 5/8 in), industrial and park
- Stichting voorheen RTM; 1,067 mm (3 ft 6 in), preserves the heritage of the Rotterdamse Tramweg Maatschappij.
- Stoomtrein Valkenburgse Meer; 700 mm (2 ft 3 9/16 in), 4.5 km, part of the Nationaal Smalspoormuseum (National Narrow-gauge Railway Museum)

== See also ==
- Argentine Salt Works Railway A 700 mm (2 ft 3 9/16 in) gauge railway in Argentina.
- Donon Light Railway, former German forest railway in what is now France
- Ledesma Mill Railway A 700 mm (2 ft 3 9/16 in) gauge railway in Argentina.
