= Tramweg Maatschappij De Graafschap =

The Tramweg Maatschappij De Graafschap was a 750 mm (2 ft 5 1/2 in) gauge steam tram that operated over 18.9 kilometres (11.7 mi) between Zutphen, Warnsveld and Hengelo, Gelderland in the Netherlands. The tramway opened in 1889, and was taken over by the Geldersche Stoomtramweg Maatschappij in 1939.

== See also ==
- Narrow-gauge railways in the Netherlands
