= Donon Light Railway =

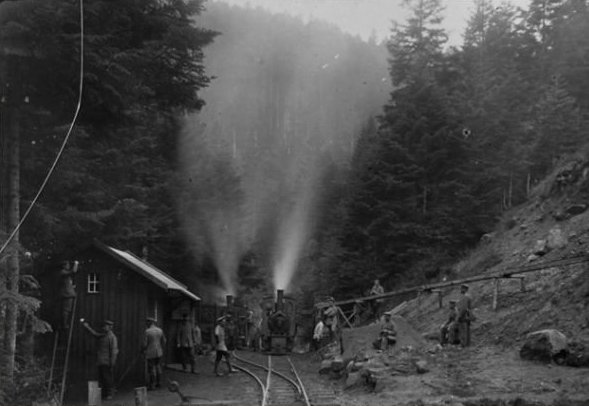
- Forest railway in the Donon mountains

Overview
- Coordinates: 48°29′08″N 7°09′57″E

Technical
- Line length: • Schirmeck–Herkules: 11.8 km (7.3 mi) • Herkules–Colas: 20.0 km (12.4 mi) • Herkules–Moussey: 12.5 km (7.8 mi)
- Track gauge: 700 mm (2 ft 3 9/16 in)
Route map
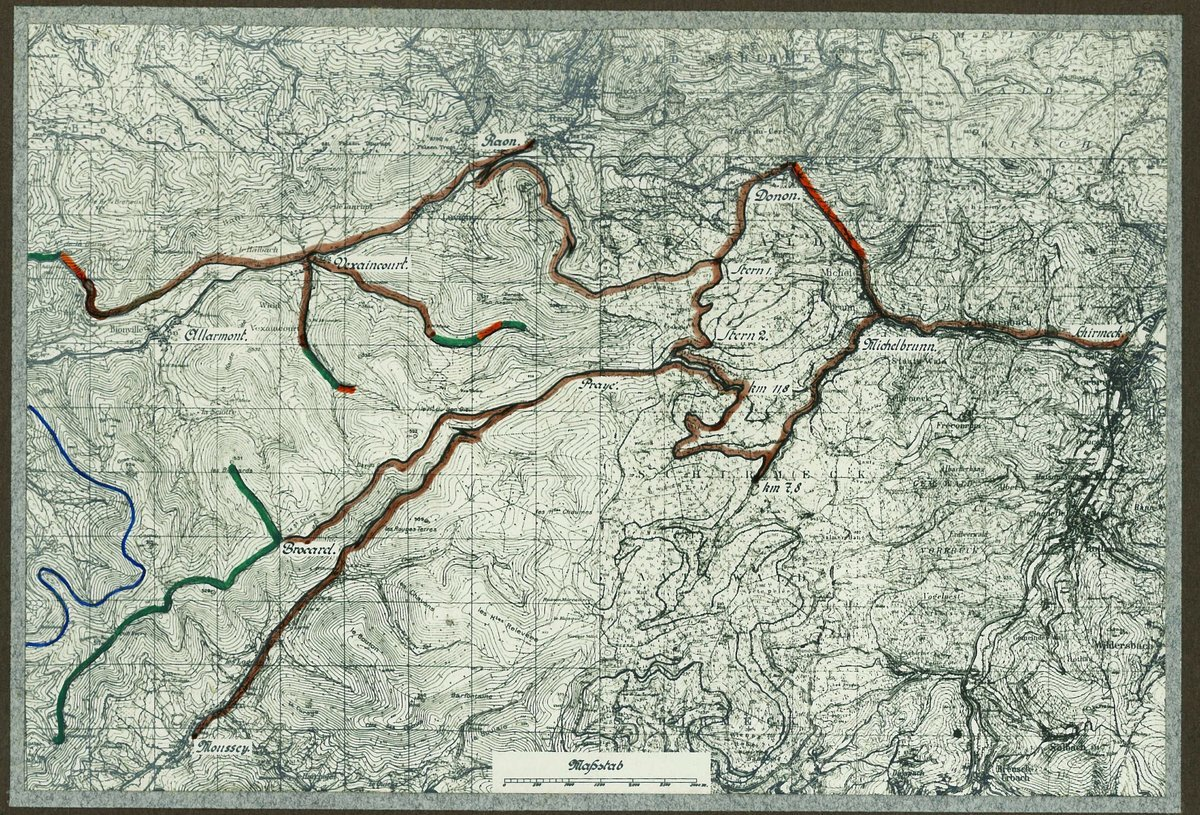
Approximate route of the light railway on a modern map
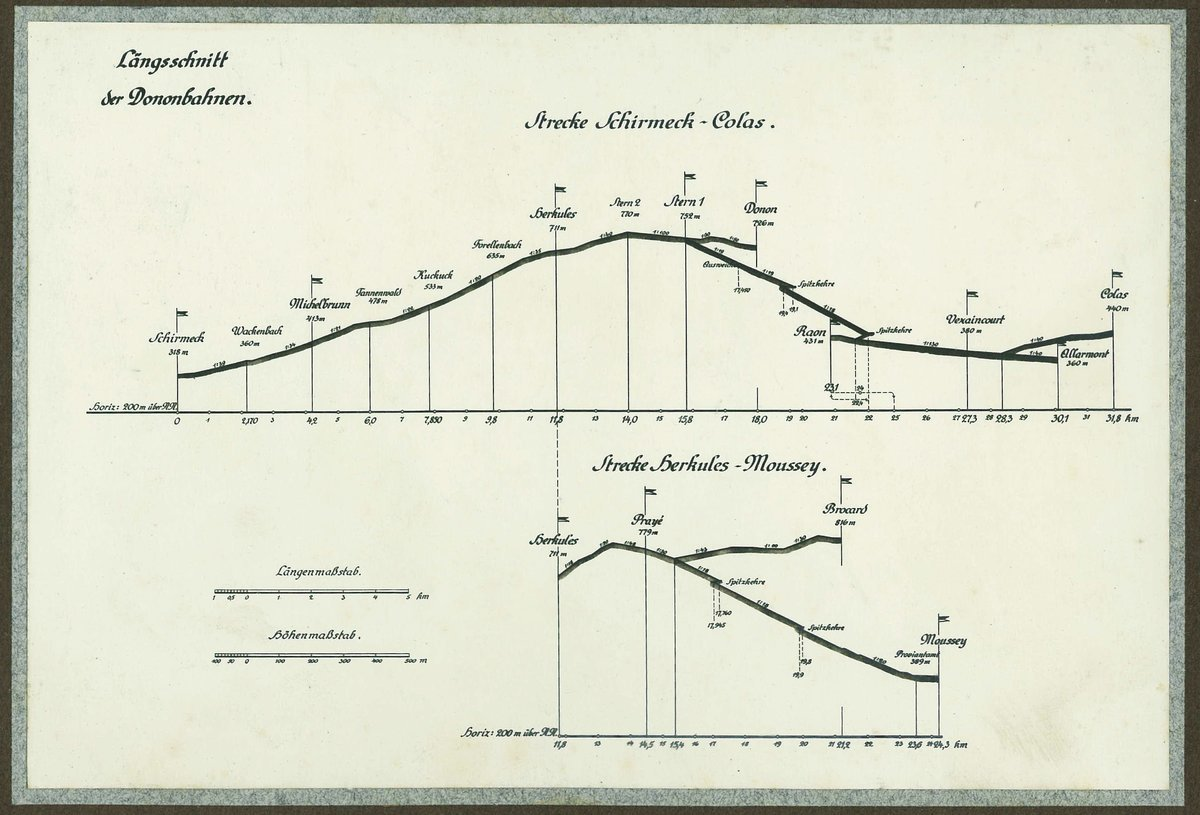
Height profile of the Donon Light Railway:
Schirmeck–Colas and Herkules–Moussey

The Donon Light Railway (German: Dononbahn) was a 44.3 km (27.5 mi) long narrow-gauge 700 mm (2 ft 3 9/16 in) gauge forest railway in the Donon mountains. It ran from Schirmeck in the Alsatian-speaking Alsace to Allarmont, Colas and Moussey in the French-speaking Vosges.

== History ==
The Donon Light Railway was built by the Germans as a forest railway at a time when Alsace belonged to the German Reich according to the Treaty of Frankfurt (1871). It was officially intended for logging, but had also a military and strategic significance from the very beginning, as it could quickly be used as a military railway in case the French wanted to recapture the area.

In 1886 forester Bierau, a forestry engineer stationed in Rothau, laid a network of forest railways in the state forests. Unloaded wagons were pulled up into the forest by horses, and after being loaded they rolled downhill by gravity. In 1892 an unusually violent storm devastated the forests of the Vosges, and hundreds of thousands of cubic metres of timber had to be transported to the sawmills. To minimise the transportation effort and cost, the German forestry administration procured two 50 hp 0-6-0 Krauss locomotives, at the suggestion of Bierau.

== Track construction ==
The originally 6 km (3.7 mi) long horse-drawn tram was made of rails with a weight of 12.5 kg/m (25.2 lb/yd) and a height of 7 cm (2.8 in) on unimpregnated fir wood sleepers. It was lengthened after the storm of 1892. It then had 31 km (19 mi) of fixed track weighing 16 kg/m (32.3 lb/yd) on oak sleepers and 3 km (1.9 mi) of portable track. The unusual track gauge of 700 mm was chosen, among other things, so that the French could not use the tracks with their Decauville and Péchot-Bourdon locomotives, which had a gauge of 600 mm (1 ft 11 5/8 in), in the event of a military attack.

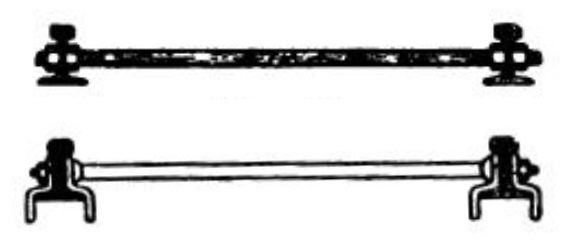
Forest railway track system of the forester Bierau from Schirmeck

Instead of the rail frames of the Decauville Railways, which were common in France, Bierau used a system of tie rods developed by him. These were beneficial especially in curves and on steep gradients, as the track gauge could be adjusted slightly wider than on the straight sections of the line. He used a system without sleepers, where the rails were laid directly on the forest floor and only connected by strong tie rods. So-called angle brackets were used, which pressed themselves into the ground or had to be buried in it. The rails were as long as possible in straight sections to minimise the number of rail joints, but in curves shorter rails were preferred.

== Route ==
The 700 mm (2 ft 3 9/16 in) gauge track ran from Schirmeck to Herkules. There, a branch line ran to Moussey.

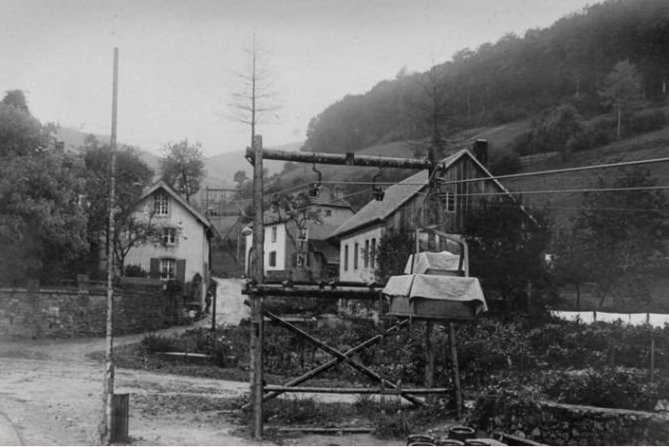
Forest railway in Michelbrunn

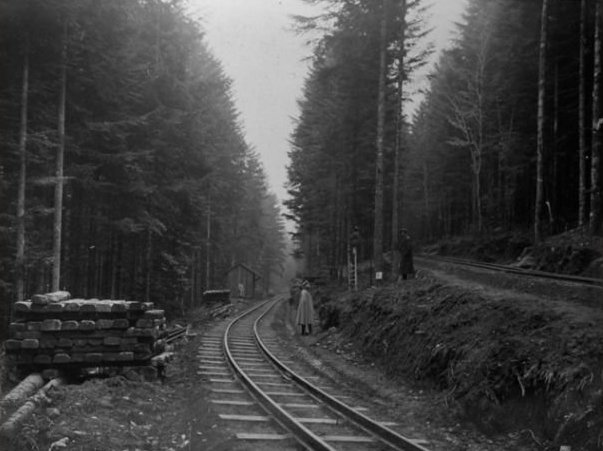
One of the branch lines

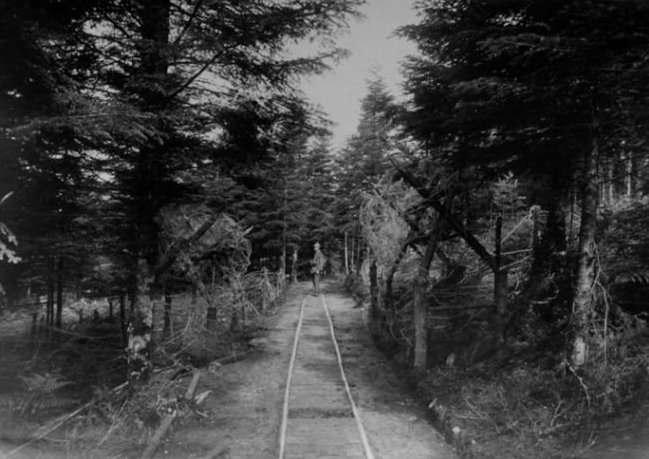
Forest railway to the trenches

== Locomotives ==
In addition to the two Krauss locomotives, eight identical O&K steam locomotives (O&K works numbers 8244-8247 and 8291-8294) were used on the Donon Light Railway and Abreschviller Forest Railway.

== Military use and decommissioning ==
During World War I, the Dordon Light Railway was used for military purposes, as the front line ran through this mountainous area as predicted. After 1919 the railway was closed down and the tracks were dismantled. Forester Bierau, like many Alsatians born on the other side of the Rhine, had to leave Alsace.
