= Geldersche Stoomtramweg Maatschappij =

Dutch steam tram

The Geldersche Stoomtramweg Maatschappij was a 750 mm (2 ft 5 1/2 in) gauge steam tram that operated over 56 kilometres (35 mi) between Arnhem, Doetinchem and Gendringen in the Netherlands, with a short section extending to Isselburg in Germany. It was built in 1881 and was closed around 1957. Several other tramways were amalgamated into the Geldersche Stoomtramweg Maatschappij. The Geldersch-Westfaalsche Stoomtram-Maatschappij was taken over in 1920, The Geldersch Overijsselsche Stoomtram Maatschappij, originally a 1,067 mm (3 ft 6 in) gauge line, was amalgamated in 1934, when the GOSM gauge was reduced to 750 mm. The Tramweg Maatschappij Zutphen-Emmerik was also taken over in 1934, and the Tramweg Maatschappij De Graafschap in 1939.

== See also ==
- Narrow-gauge railways in the Netherlands
