= Tramweg Onderneming Gouda-Bodegraven =

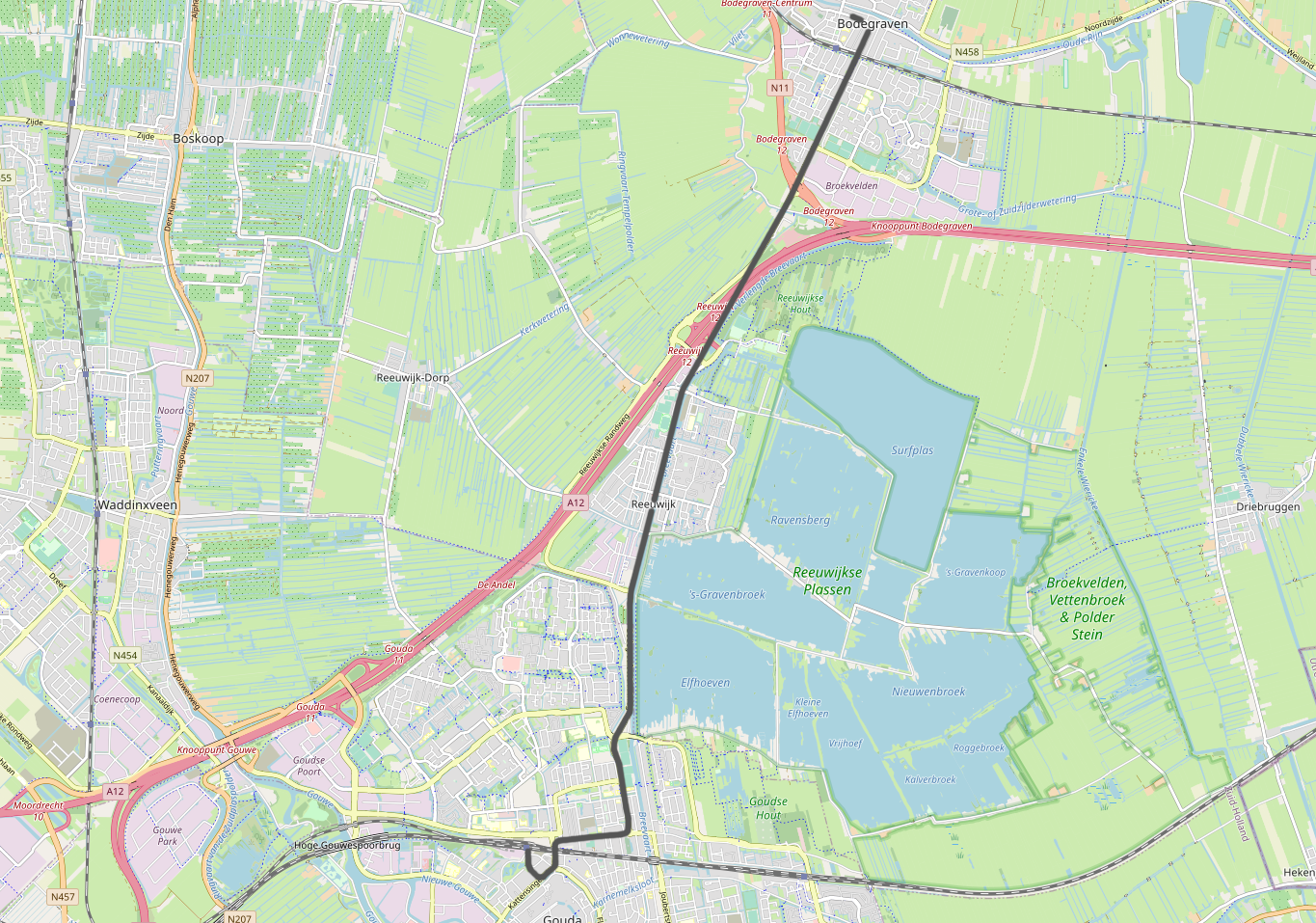

The Tramweg Onderneming Gouda-Bodegraven was a 750 mm (2 ft 5 1/2 in) gauge steam tram that operated over an 8.8 kilometres (5.5 mi) line between Gouda and Bodegraven in the Netherlands. The line was also known as "Stoomtramweg Maatschappij Gouda", then "Algemeene Tramweg Maatschappij", and eventually part of "M.E.T" ("Maatschappij tot Exploitatie van Tramwegen"). The line opened in 1881 and closed in 1917.

== See also ==
- Narrow-gauge railways in the Netherlands
