= Domburg-Binnen =

Coordinates: 51.5636°N 3.4978°E

Domburg-Binnen is a former municipality in the Dutch province of Zeeland. It existed until 1816, when it merged with Domburg-Buiten to form the new municipality of Domburg.

The municipality of Domburg-Binnen covered the city of Domburg itself, and a few of the surrounding dunes.
