= Efteling Steam Train Company =

Passenger railway line

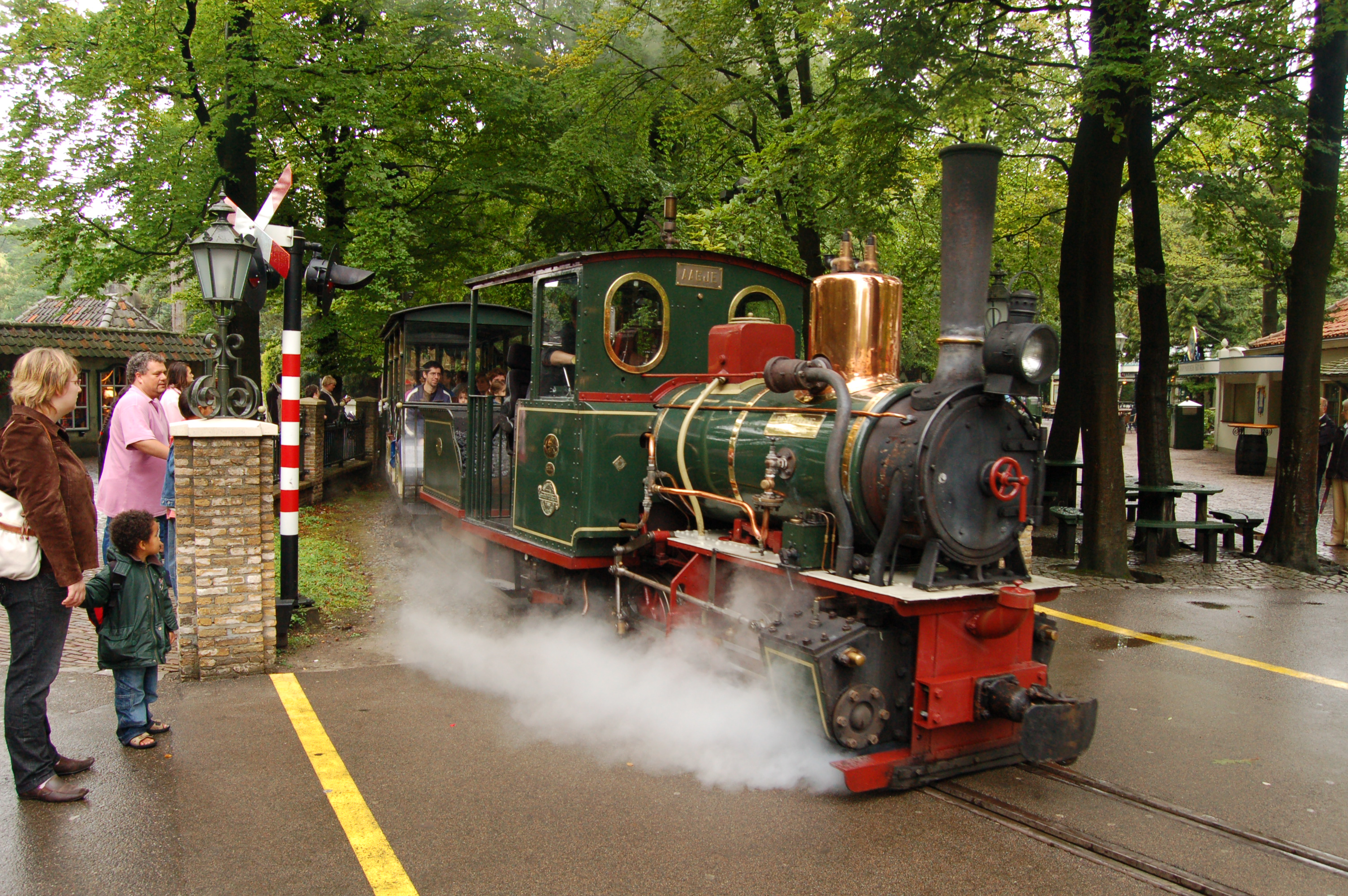
The Aagje locomotive

The Efteling Steam Train Company (Dutch: Efteling Stoomtrein Maatschappij) is a 600 mm (1 ft 11 5/8 in) narrow gauge passenger railway line at the Efteling theme park, in the Netherlands.

== History ==
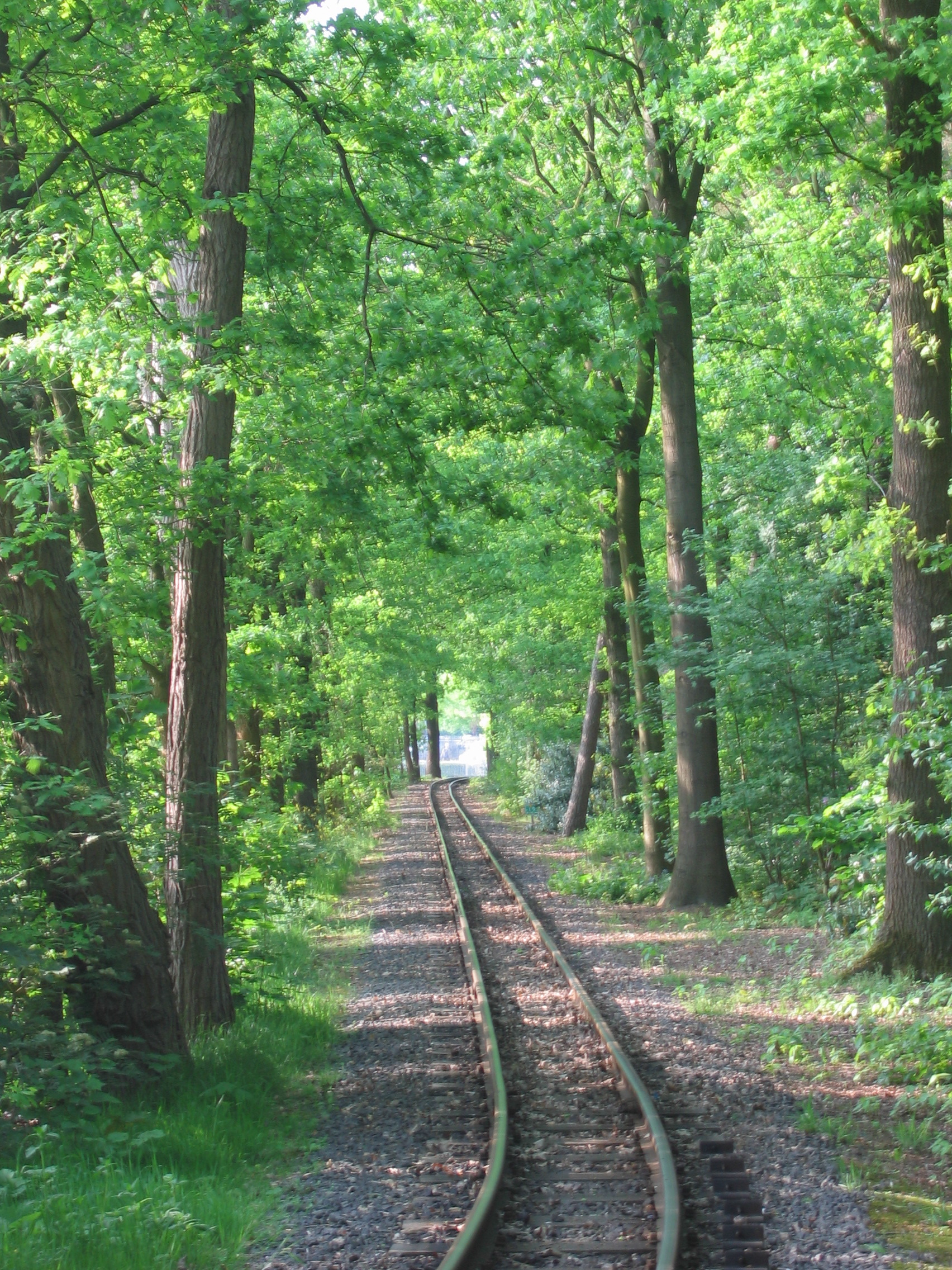
The track of the steam train through the wooded park area

The line was constructed in 1968 using Second-hand Cockerill rails in a U-shaped track around the park with a station at each end. It opened to the public for the first time in March 1969. Both stations had a wye or rail triangle enabling the locomotives to run chimney-first at all times. In 1984 the line was extended to a circular track around the park, with a total track length of 3 kilometres (1.9 mi). Nowadays, the line has stations located in the Adventure and Fairy realms, plus one station for the fairy characters to board.

== Locomotives ==
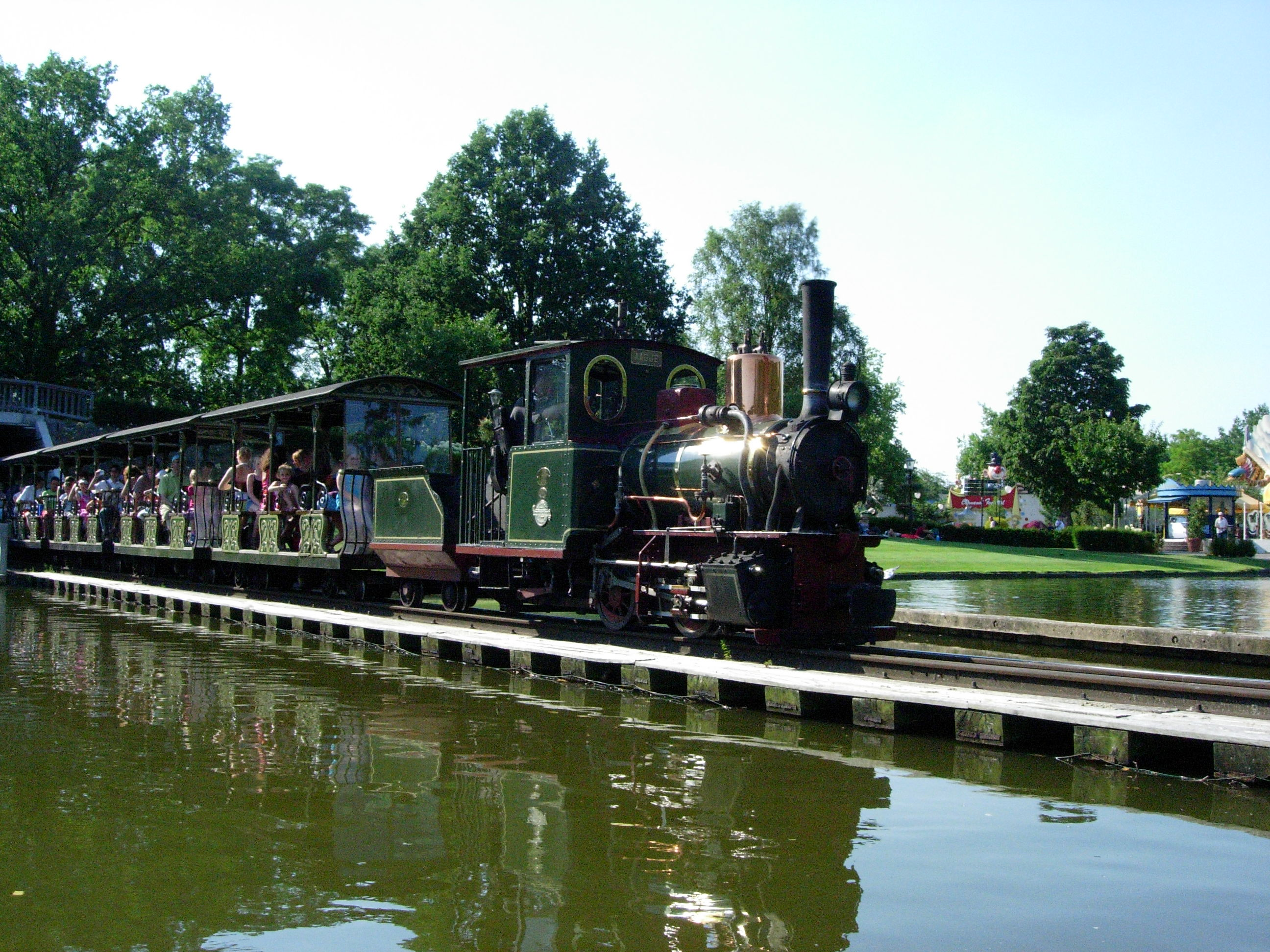
Aagje traveling over the Gondoletta pond

- Aagje (1911): The first locomotive bought, 'Aagje' an Orenstein & Koppel, was, at that time, still in operation at the IJsseloord Brickworks in Arnhem. Aagje started its ‘fairy duty’ in 1969.
- Moortje (1908): After service in a Belgian coal mine it became operational in the Efteling in 1974.
- Neefje (1914): Originally a fireless steam locomotive. Operational in the Efteling in 1979 and retired 2001. This particular locomotive is named after Kees Neve, who rebuilt and delivered Aagje, Moortje and Neefje for the Efteling. He was a well-known person among Dutch narrow-gauge enthusiasts.
- Trijntje (1992): Built by Alan Keef Ltd, operational in the Efteling in 1992. It is 3.90 metres (12 ft 9 1/2 in) long and 1.53 metres (5 ft 1/4 in) wide. It weighs about 7,000 kilograms (15,432 pounds) and its colour is 'Anton Pieck Red'.
- A Diepholzer Maschinenfabrik Fritz Schöttler (Diema) (German locomotive manufacturer) diesel locomotive for maintenance purposes.

Each locomotive pulls six carriages designed by Anton Pieck. He also designed the locomotives' tenders, having converted them from tank engines.

In 2024, Efteling announced that the locomotives would be converted to battery electric power. Aagje was the first to be converted, and it was placed into service in May 2025.

== See also ==
- Narrow-gauge railways in the Netherlands
- Rail transport in Walt Disney Parks and Resorts
