= Stoomtrein Katwijk Leiden =

Coordinates: 52.1590°N 4.4429°E

Stoomtrein Katwijk Leiden (formerly Stoomtrein Valkenburgse Meer, abbreviated SVM), is a 700 mm (2 ft 3 9/16 in) narrow gauge heritage railway line around the Valkenburgse Meer in the south of Katwijk, Netherlands. Although the name translates as Steam Train Valkenburg Lake, technically actually trams are used for the tourist attraction. Carriages are mostly remakes of early-20th century tram carriages, built by the Nederlandse Smalspoor Stichting (Netherlands Narrow-gauge Foundation) in Katwijk.

== History ==
The SVM finds its origins in the south dunes of Katwijk. From the starting point Vrieze Wei, not far from the city center, volunteers started in 1973 to operate a steam train line on the tracks formerly used by the dune water company, which abolished the transport of goods using these railways through the dunes. Having bought steam- and diesel locomotives from companies also ceasing their activities on narrow gauge railroads, the passenger carriages were built on site by the volunteers themselves.

== Relocation ==
By the end of the 1980s, Staatsbosbeheer, the owner of the South Dunes, decided that a tramline through the dunes were no longer tolerated. The narrow-gauge foundation decided to create a museum with a heritage tramline. A location was found at the Valkenburgse Meer, in the municipality of Valkenburg (in those days a separate municipality, now part of Katwijk). In 1992, the last ride through the dunes was made, a year later was the first ride around the lake. The museum was opened in 1995, with a major expansion in 2003.

On the first of April 2025, the shore of the lake collapsed due to bad supervision with sand extraction which was happening in the lake. This set off a chain reaction which destroyed it along the width of 150m, and for up to 20 meters inward. In a few days the bottom of the lake rose by 13 meters. Since this day, the train can't drive around the lake anymore, and has to go one way and back.

== Gallery ==
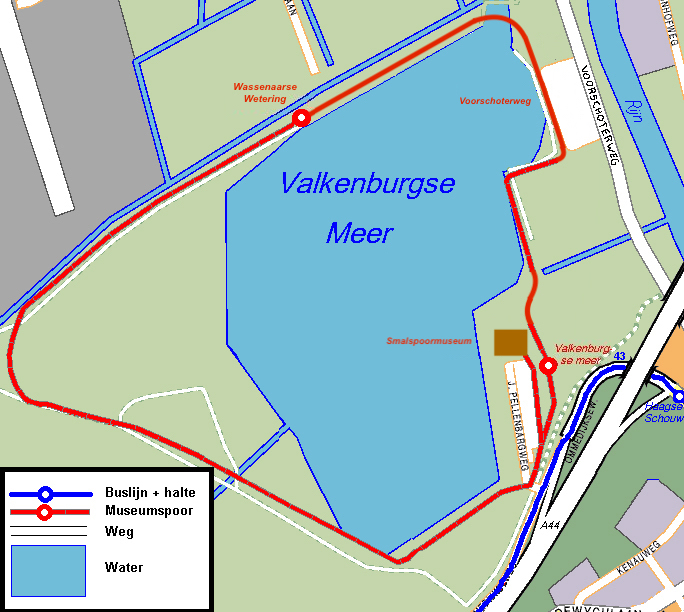
Route of the tram line

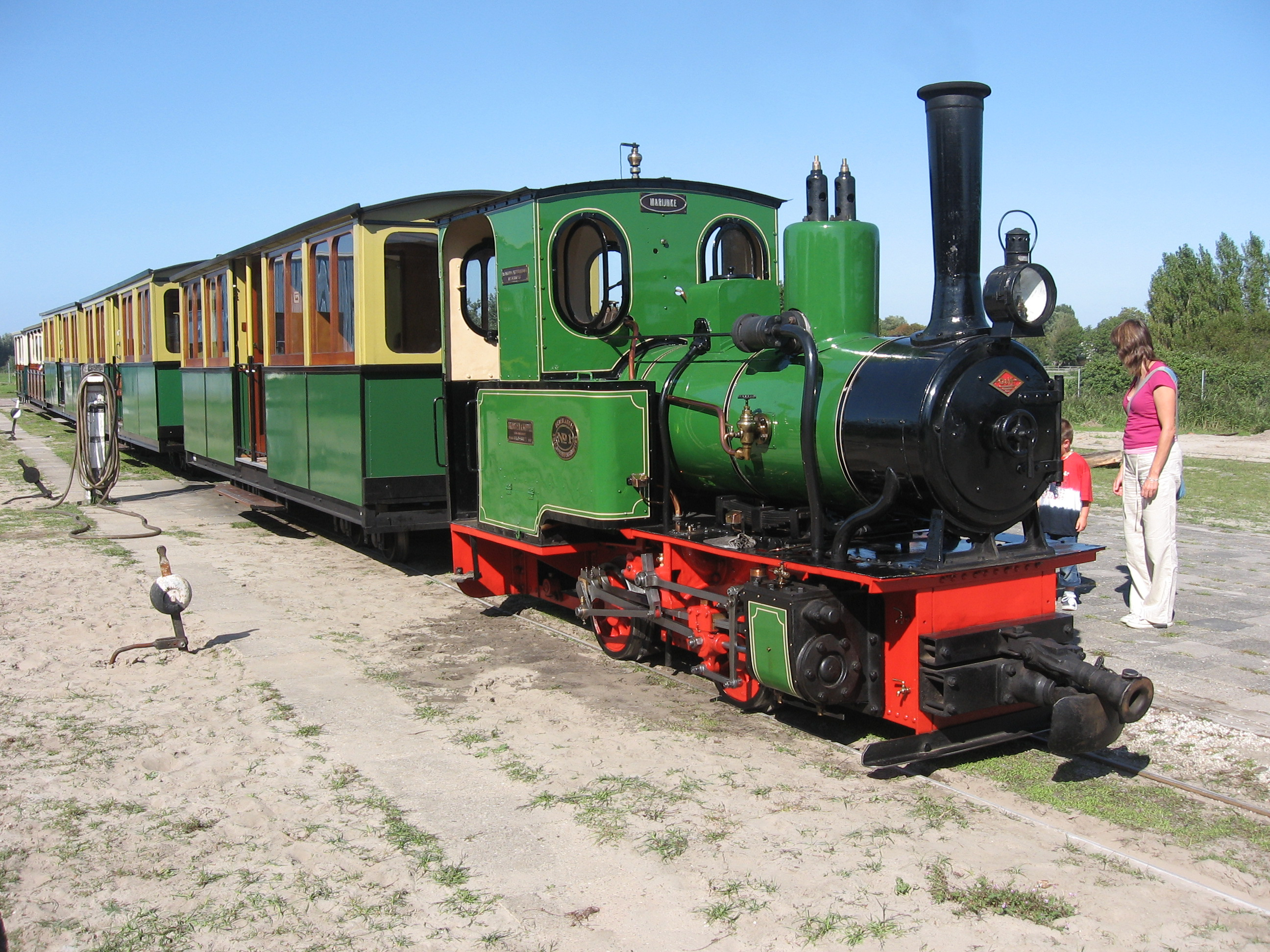
Locomotive no. 1; "Marijnke"

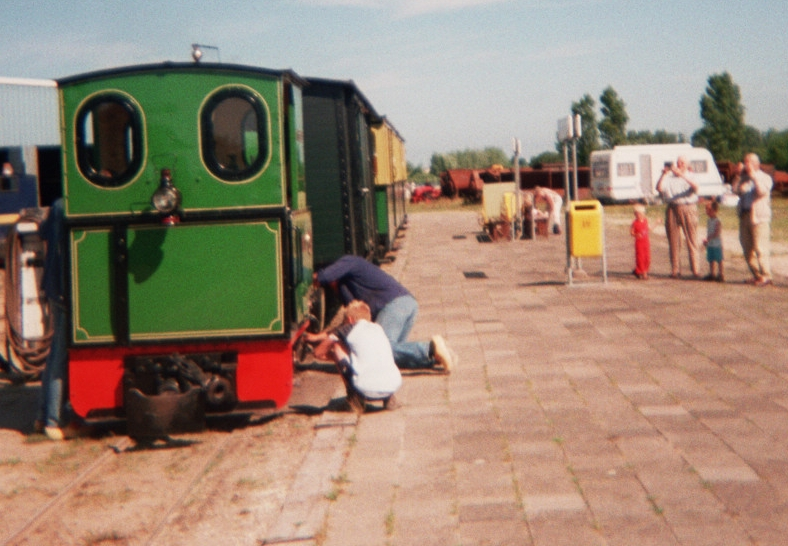
Tram stop in front of the museum; "Marijnke" is coupled onto a tram

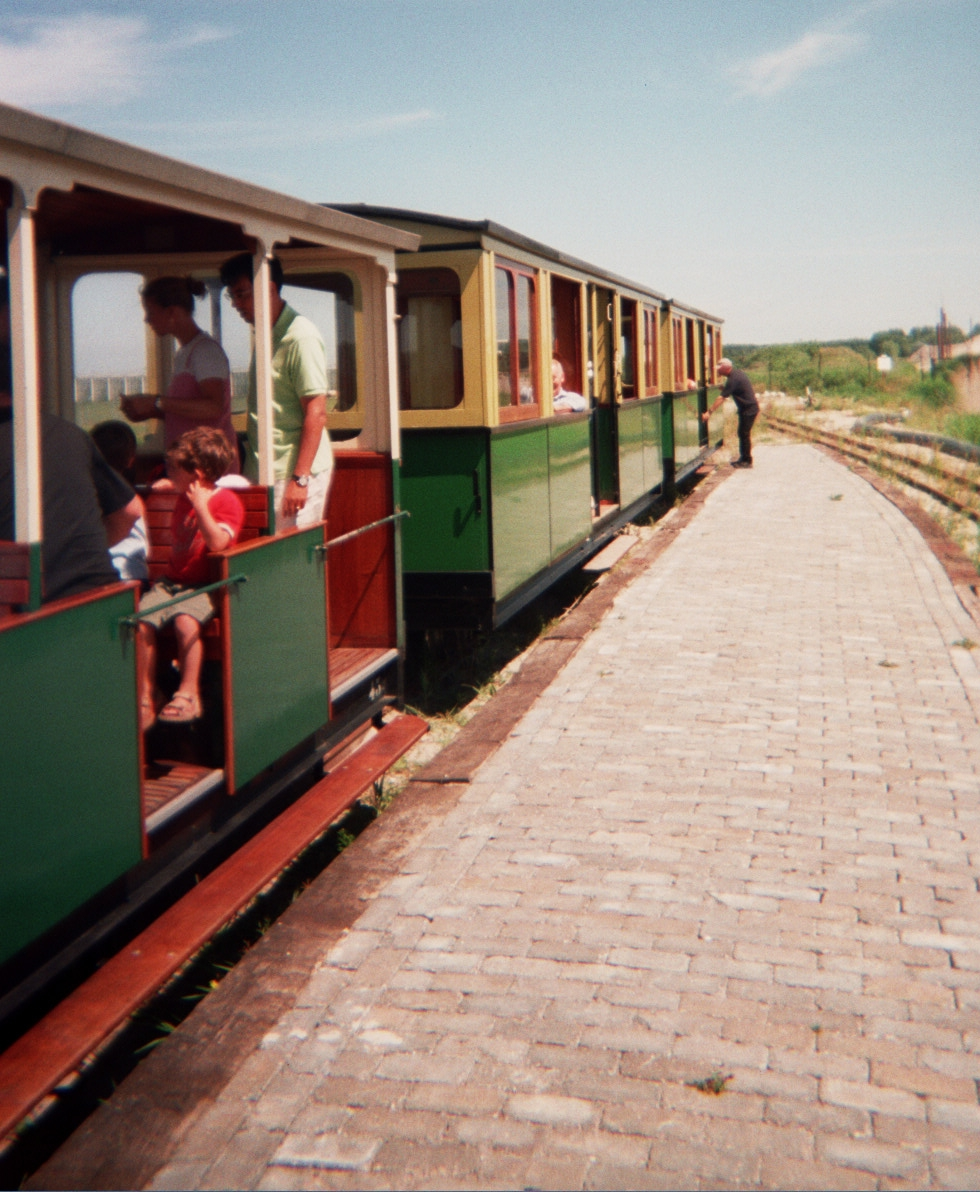
End stop Wassenaarse Wetering

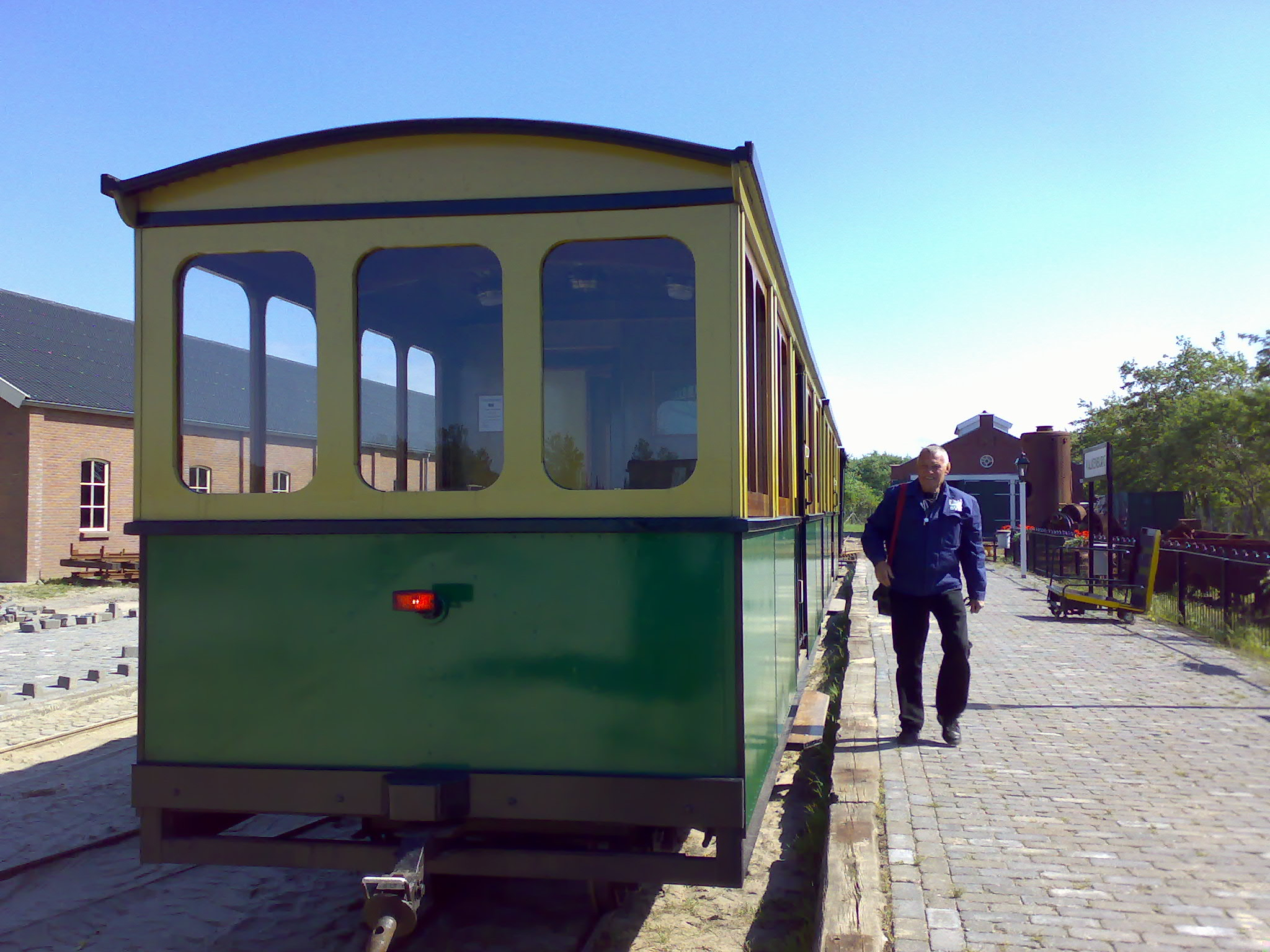
Tram at museum grounds

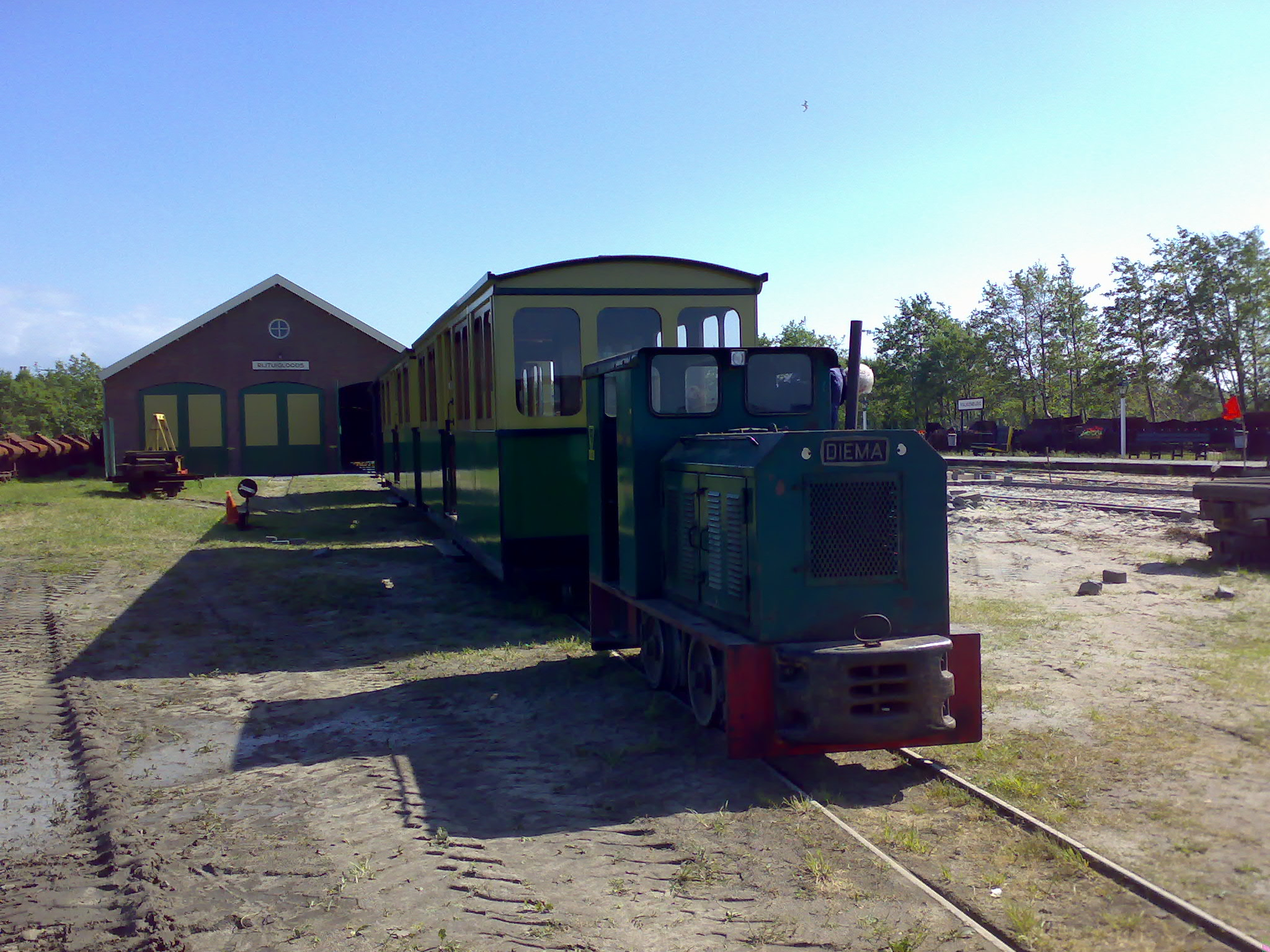
Tram with diesel traction (Diema DS40/2 dieselloc)

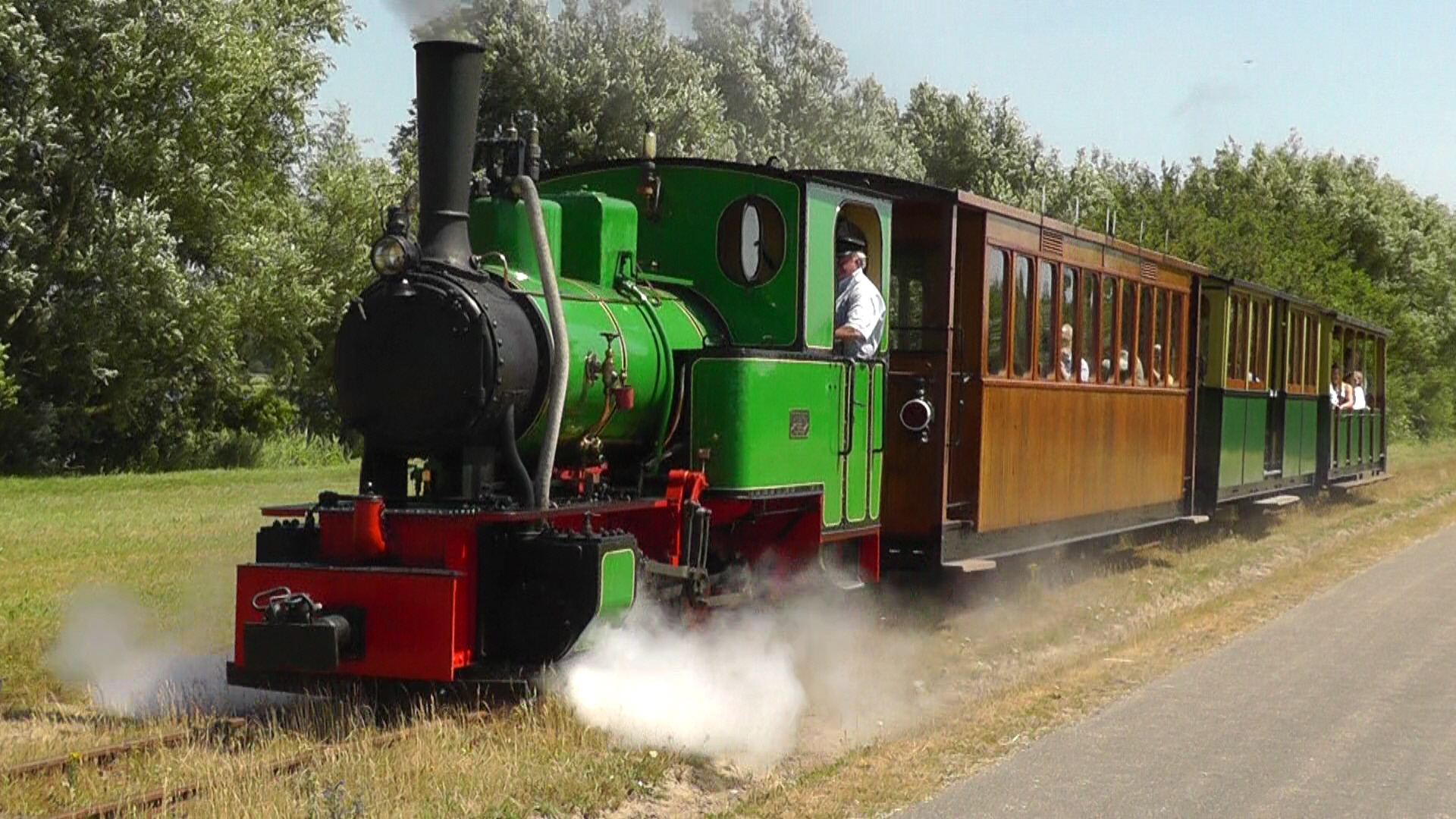
Henschel no. 21147

== See also ==
- Narrow-gauge railways in the Netherlands
