= Geldersch-Westfaalsche Stoomtram-Maatschappij =

The Geldersch-Westfaalsche Stoomtram-Maatschappij was a 750 mm (2 ft 5 1/2 in) gauge steam tram that operated over two routes, firstly between Lichtenvoorde, Aalten, Heurne and Bocholt, a total of 21 kilometres (13 mi), and secondly between Lichtenvoorde, Terborg and Zeddam, a total of 28 kilometres (17 mi). The tramway operated between 1908 and about 1953, however in 1920 the company was merged into the Geldersche Stoomtramweg Maatschappij.

== See also ==
- Narrow-gauge railways in the Netherlands
