= Tramweg Maatschappij Zutphen-Emmerik =

Steam tram system between the Netherlands and Germany

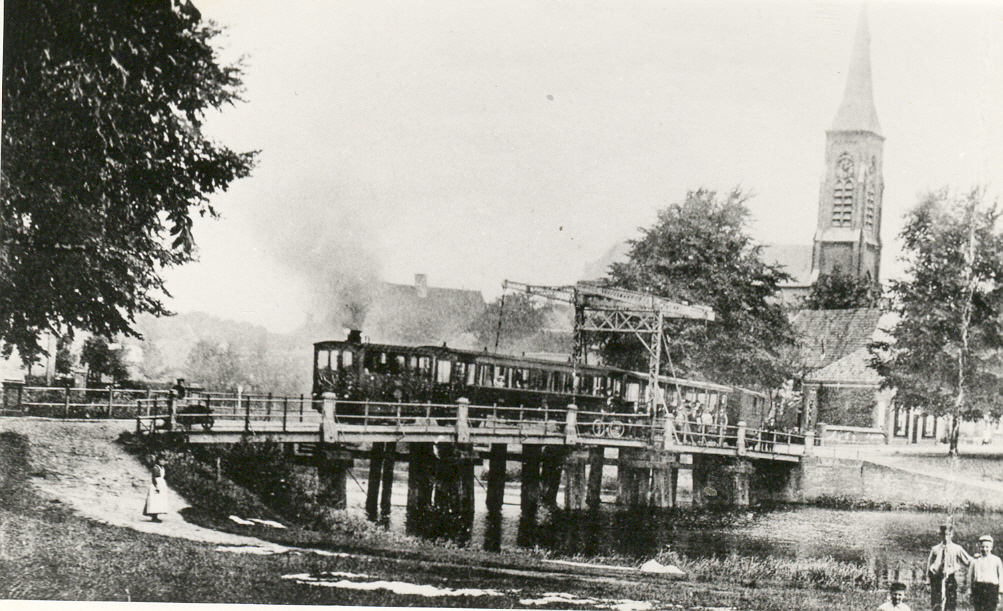

The Tramweg Maatschappij Zutphen-Emmerik was a 750 mm (2 ft 5 1/2 in) gauge steam tram that operated over 57 kilometres (35 mi) of track between Deventer, Zutphen and Doetinchem in the Netherlands and Emmerich in Germany. The line opened in 1902 and closed in 1954, but in 1934 was taken over by the Geldersche Stoomtramweg Maatschappij.

== See also ==
- Narrow-gauge railways in the Netherlands
