= Domburg =

- City
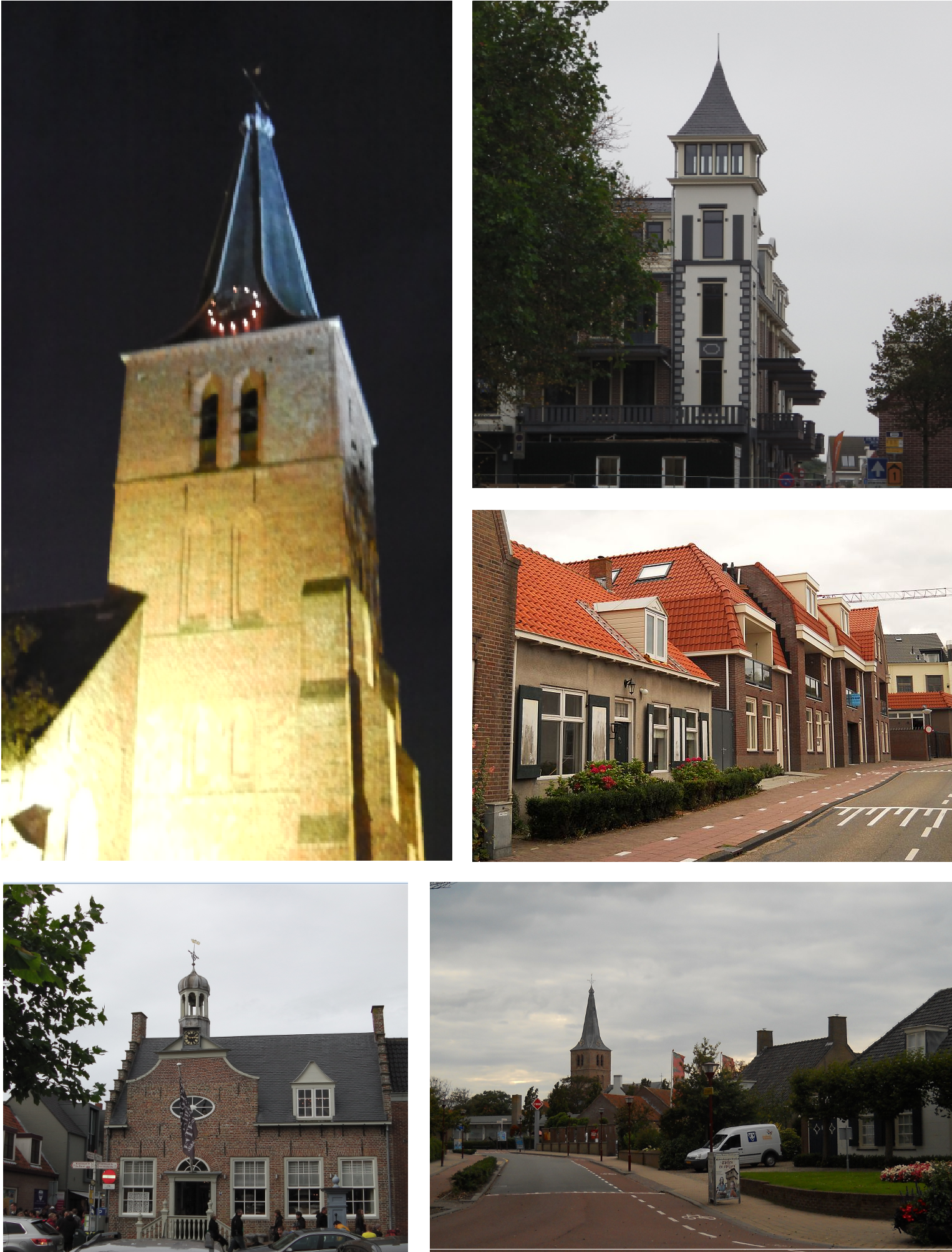
- Images from left to right; Old church at night, New small residential tower in the center, street in center, old municipal building, view to center

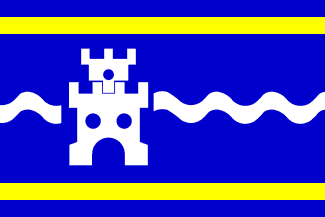
- Flag Coat of arms

- Location in the province of Zeeland in the Netherlands Domburg (Netherlands)
- Coordinates: 51°33′45″N 3°29′47″E
- Country: Netherlands
- Province: Zeeland
- Municipality: Veere

Area
  - Total: 6.68 km^{2} (2.58 sq mi)
- Elevation: 4.4 m (14 ft)

Population (2021)
  - Total: 1,660
  - Density: 249/km^{2} (644/sq mi)
- Time zone: UTC+1 (CET)
  - Summer (DST): UTC+2 (CEST)
- Postal code: 4357
- Dialing code: 0118

Domburg is a seaside resort on the North Sea, on the northwest coast of Walcheren in the Dutch province of Zeeland. It is a part of the municipality of Veere, and lies about 11 km northwest of the city of Middelburg, the provincial capital.

== Demographics ==
In 2010, the town of Domburg had 1,490 inhabitants, up from 1,251 in 2001. The built-up area of the town was 0.78 km^{2}, and contained 881 residences.

== History ==
The area of Domburg has been inhabited since at least 4,000 BCE. In 1647 after heavy storms on the beach of Domburg a sanctuary was discovered with around 40 stones with Latin inscriptions and carvings of several gods, among them of Neptune (sea) and Mercury (trade), but the majority of a local female deity: Nehalennia who appears to have protected both trade and shipping. According to the inscriptions the stones were erected by tradesmen and captains to fulfil their vows after a safe journey, mentioning explicitly on one stone a merchant of pottery doing business with Britain.

From a later period (starting 650 AD) many coins have been found on the beach including Anglo-Saxon sceattas. The settlement on the exact present day location of Domburg however originates from a circular earthen citadel that was discovered according to expectations by archaeologists in 1991 and which was dated to around 875 AD a period shortly after recorded raids by Danes.

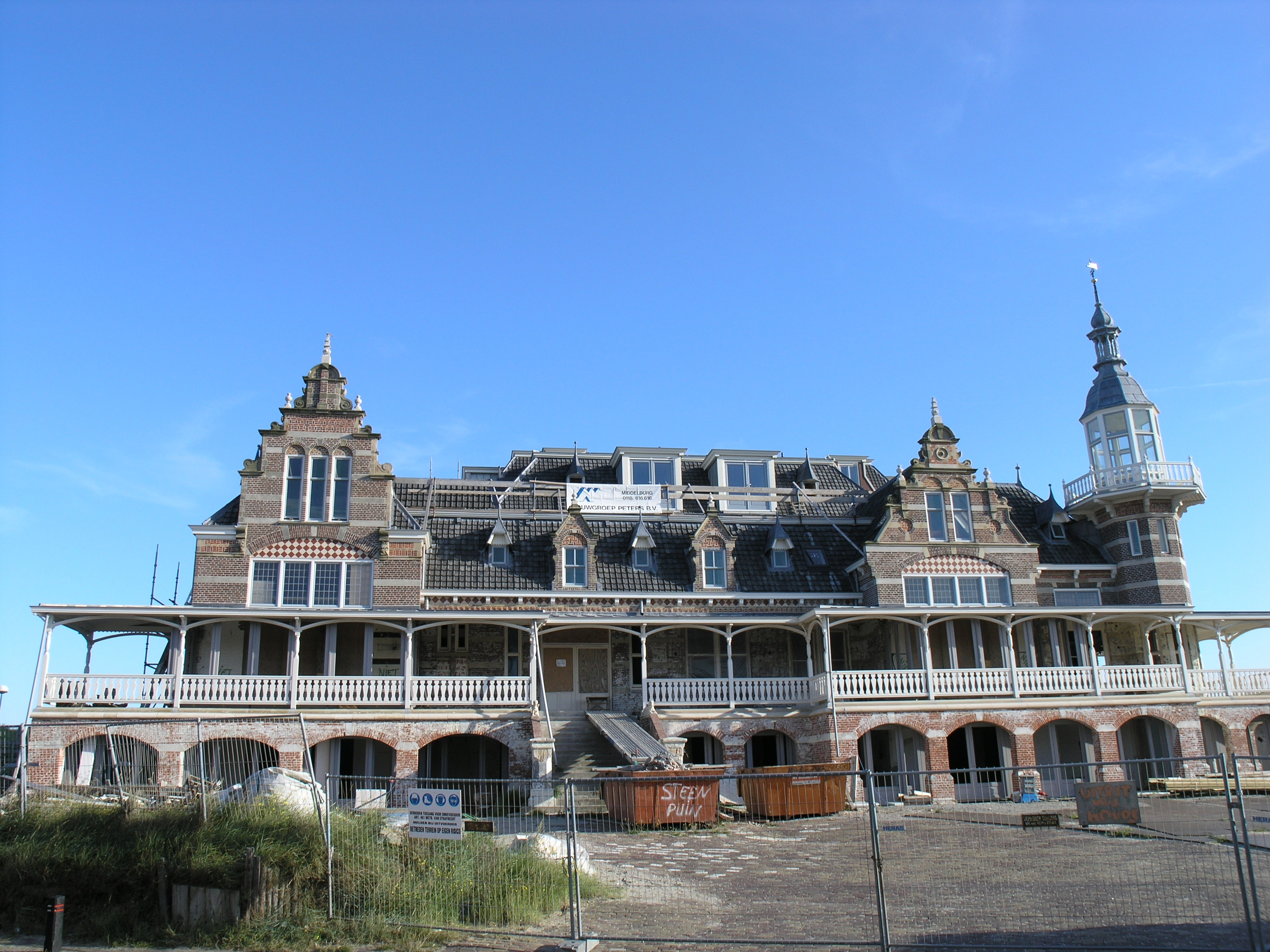
Bathing pavilion being restored

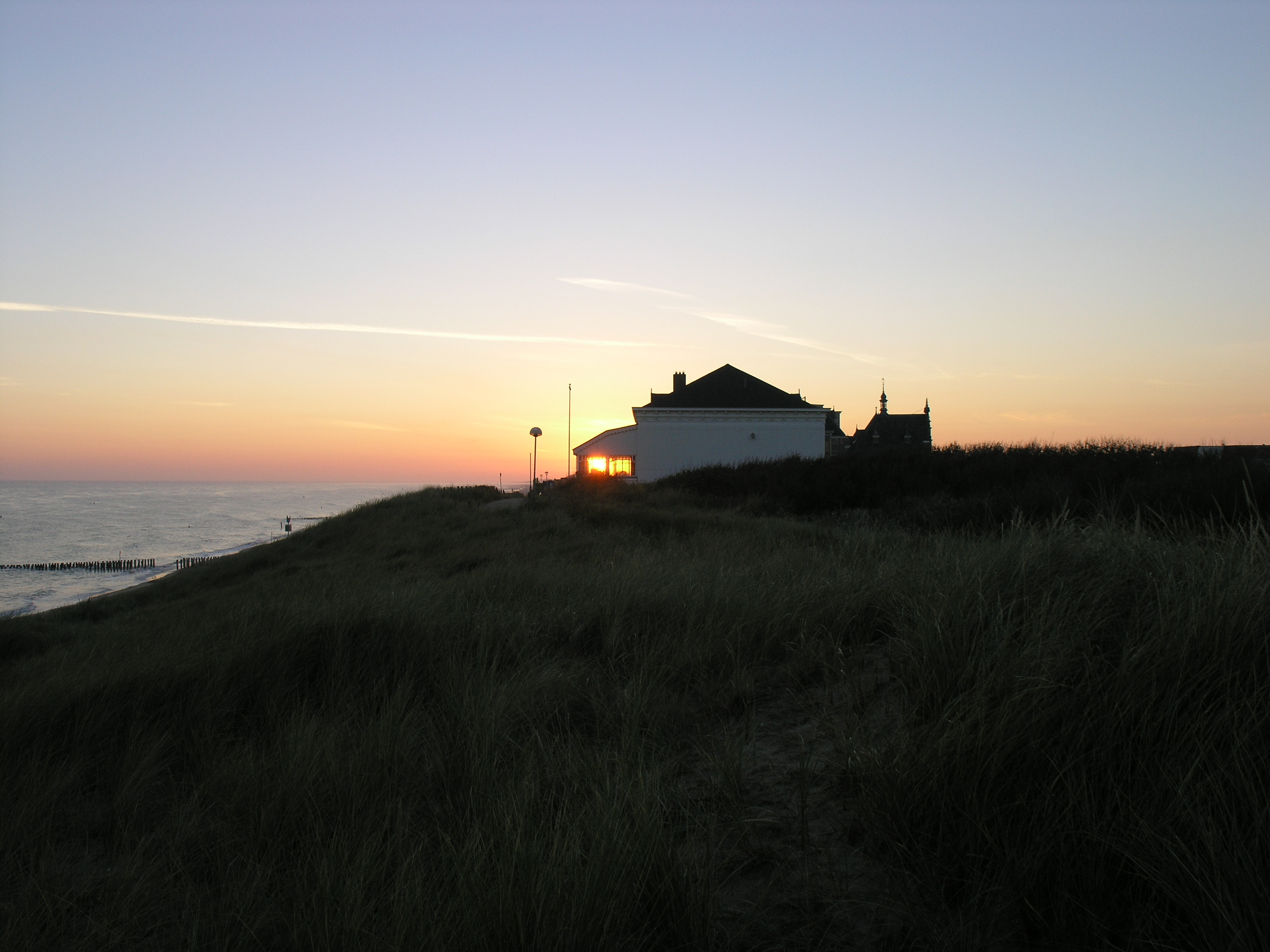
Sunrise with dunes and villa

In the following centuries there would be considerable activity by monks, not in the least because of salt works and the reclamation of land by which the island of Walcheren was formed. Near Domburg the mediaeval castle of Westhove, now a family hostel, used to be a stronghold of the abbot of the Abbey of Middelburg.

The town of Domburg, actually more a village, surprisingly received a city charter at the early date of 1223. Probably because the counts of Holland had to seek refuge on the island in some neighbourly quarrel. Until the 19th century the town did not change much in its agricultural and (some) fishing character, although tourism started in the 17th century with cityfolk from Middelburg who would enjoy a Sunday trip to the area in summer because of its coast and woodlands and merry inns. Wealth from both West- and East Indian trade also enabled many merchants from Middelburg and Flushing to build manorhouses with lavish gardens in the area, but only a few have survived.

The lordship of Domburg used to belong to the dukes of Burgundy when they were counts of both Holland and Zeeland. For financial reasons they sold Domburg to a lesser branch of their family from which it eventually ended up in the hands of private individuals and passing through the hands of more than one family until lordship rights were completely abolished in 1848. Mostly they were rich merchants from Zeeland cities who returned from India after having served as the director of trade in for example Bengalen.

For a long time Domburg consisted of two jurisdictions: Domburg-Binnen (the town and coast) and Domburg-Buiten (the country side). In 1816 they were united into a single municipality, into which the village of Oostkapelle was merged in 1966. At the end of the last century all the smaller towns of Walcheren were joined to form the municipality of Veere.

Starting 1834 Domburg became a seaside resort offering a bathing cure and facilities. A small Badpaviljoen was built shortly after on top of the dunes, which was replaced by a larger one in 1888 which offered space for gentleman playing billiards and ladies drinking tea, a concert room, a seaview veranda and more of such amenities that beach life requires. Most important for its development was however the arrival of a railway station at Flushing and a connecting steamship service with England. A considerable British influence in these years was responsible for Domburg establishing the second golf-course in the Netherlands, although it never expanded over a friendly nine holes.

Like in so many seaside resorts at the end of the 19th century a flock of European royalty landed at Domburg for a few years when the resort was fashionable only to move along again a few years later. The Grand Duchess of Mecklenburg-Pommern regularly arrived in the town by private-charter train on Stoomtram Walcheren. Instrumental however in the mythology of the place and the mentioned fashion was the very successful doctor Johann Georg Mezger who achieved international fame for his scientific approach of physiotherapy and for being the founding father of Swedish massage.

Domburg is perhaps best known for its hosting of a group of artists of which Piet Mondriaan or Mondrian is the best known. His Pier and Ocean paintings was inspired by the same location where James Abbott McNeill Whistler painted the Domburg sea with its characteristic piers which do not cater for the happy crowd but are meant to break waves that may damage the dunes and thus the existence of the place. This lead Domburg to be a testing ground for Leiden's De Stijl movement.

(For references to literature see Dutch language page) The statistical area "Domburg", which also can include the surrounding countryside, has a population of around 1650.

== Items of local interest ==
- Once the location of shrine dedicated to Nehalennia.
- Formerly the western terminus of Stoomtram Walcheren which ran to Koudekerke, Middelburg and Vlissingen.

== Pictures ==
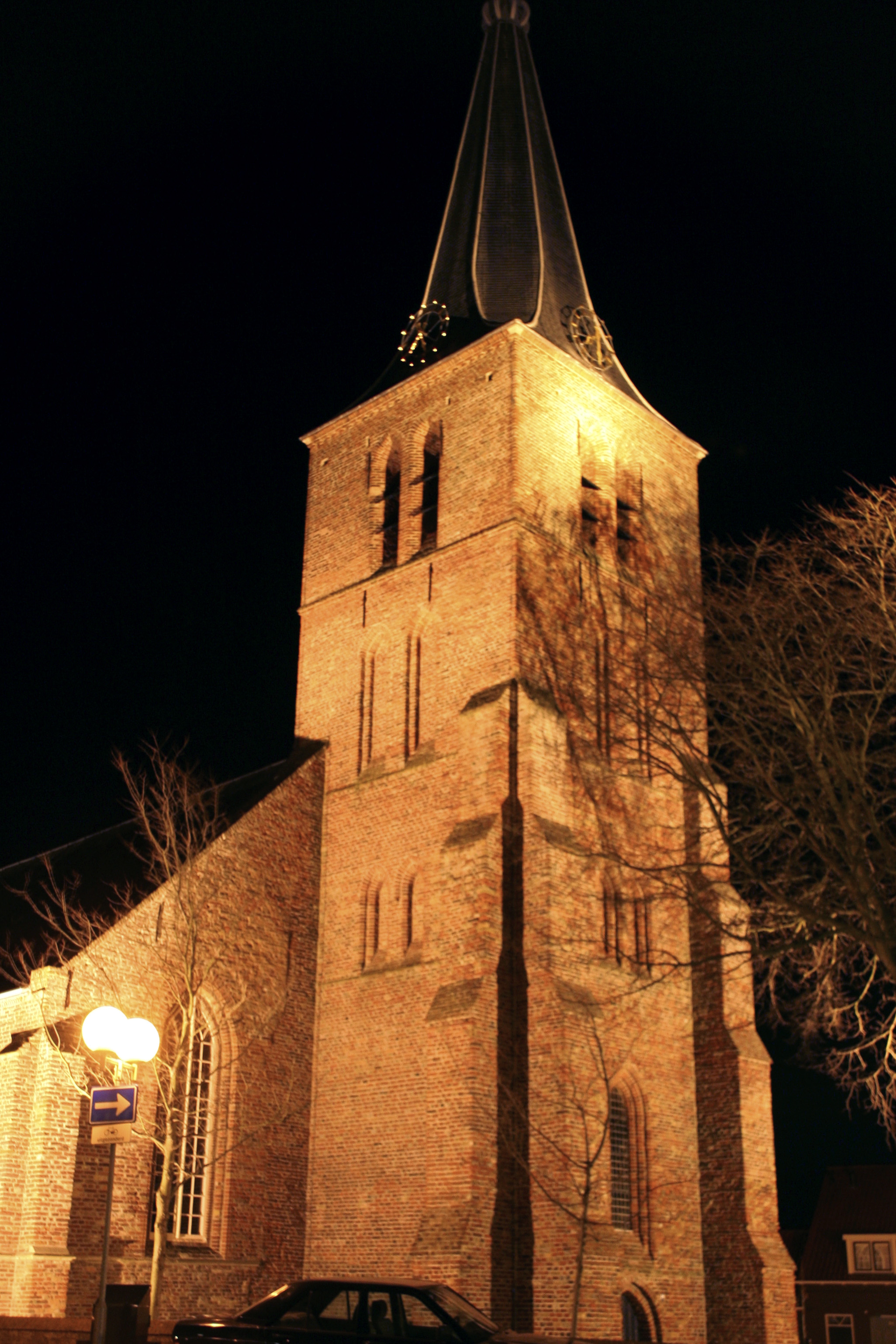
Church in Domburg

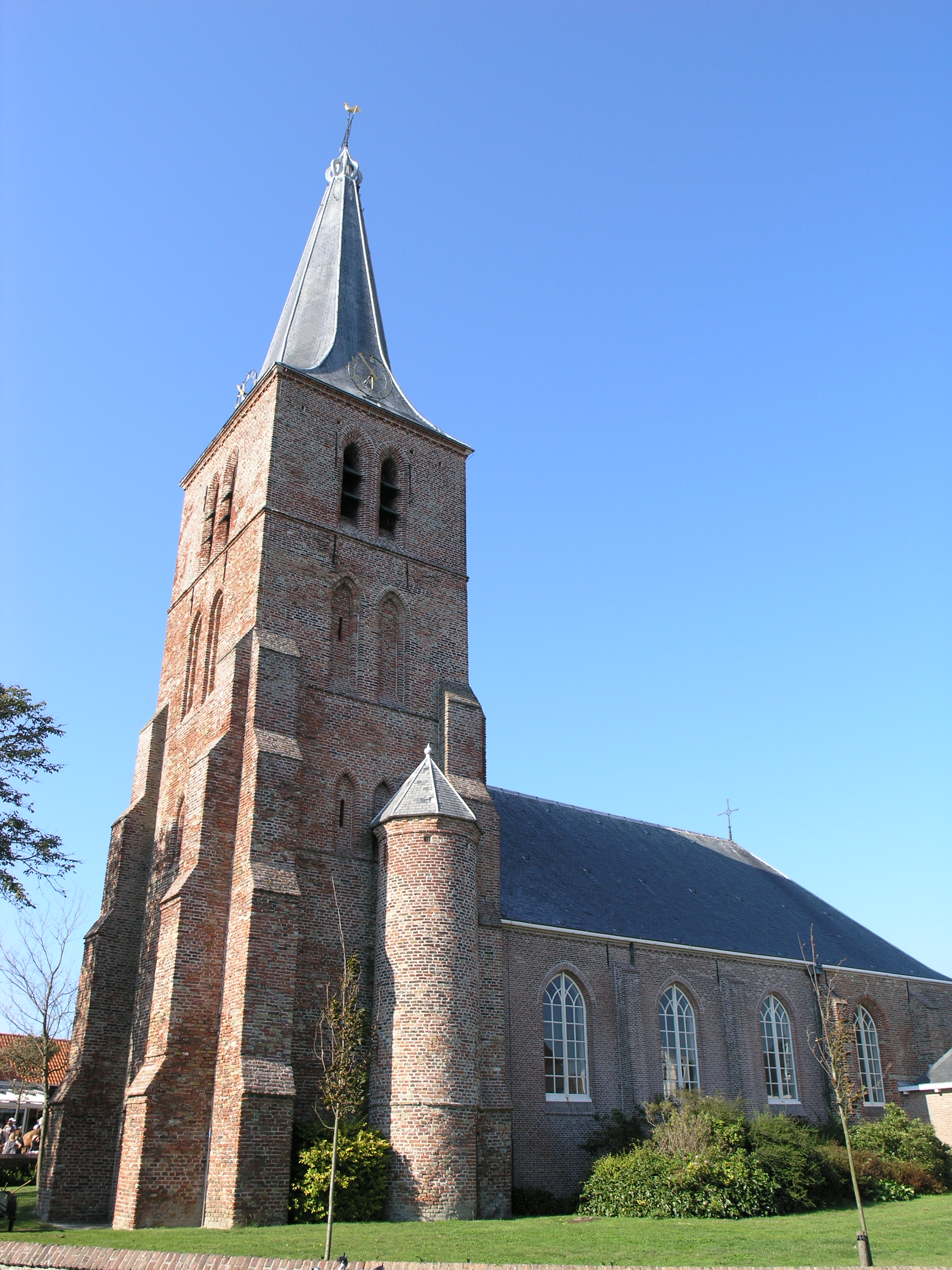
Church in Domburg
