= Yerba Buena Steam Tram =

Coordinates: 26.81525°S 65.21958°W

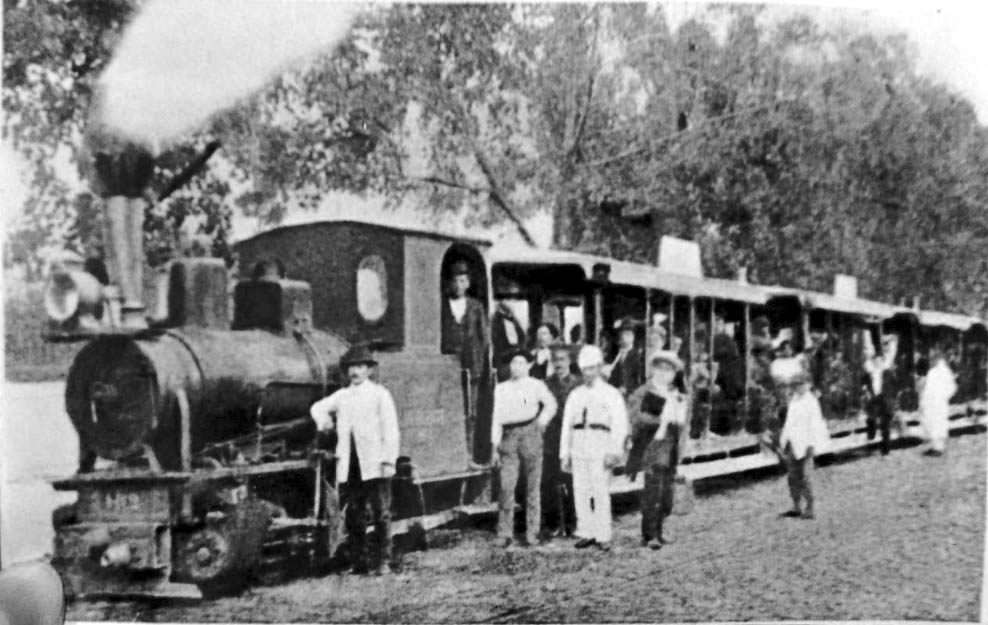
- The train photographed in 1916

Overview
- Native name: Tranvía rural a vapor de Yerba Buena
- Locale: Yerba Buena, Tucumán
- Termini: Plaza Alberdi; Horco Molle

Service
- Type: Tram

History
- Opened: 1916
- Closed: 1926

Technical
- Line length: 12 km (7.5 mi)
- Track gauge: 600 mm (1 ft 11 5/8 in)
Route map
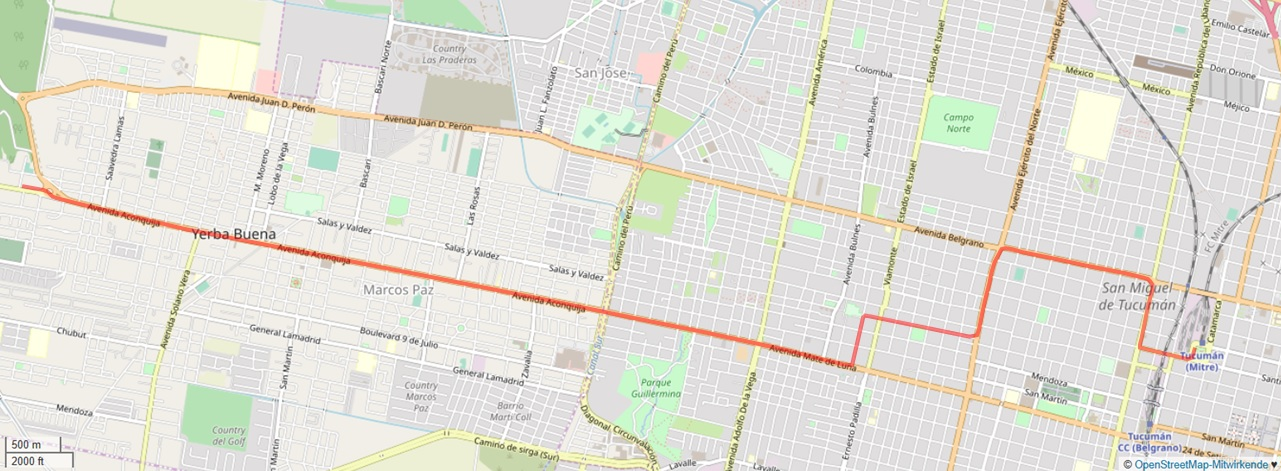
Former route superimposed onto a modern map

The Yerba Buena Steam Tram (Spanish: Tranvía Rural a Vapor de Yerba Buena, nicknamed Trencito or La Chorbita) was a 12 km (7.5 mi) long 600 mm (1 ft 11 5/8 in) gauge railway in the city of Yerba Buena in Tucumán Province. It was inaugurated on 29 June 1916 during the Centennial of the Argentine Independence and was shut down a decade later in 1926.

== Opening ==
On November 15, 1915, it was promulgated the law that allowed the Executive Power of Tucumán (at the time, Governor Ernesto Padilla) to create a freight and passenger rail line to connect San Miguel de Tucumán with the cities of Los Cuarteles, Villa Luján (también llamada Villa del Pueblo Nuevo), Villa Marcos Paz, Yerba Buena, and Parque Aconquija.

The initiative was known as "Tranvía Rural" and the service was opened to the public on June 29, 1916.

== Route ==
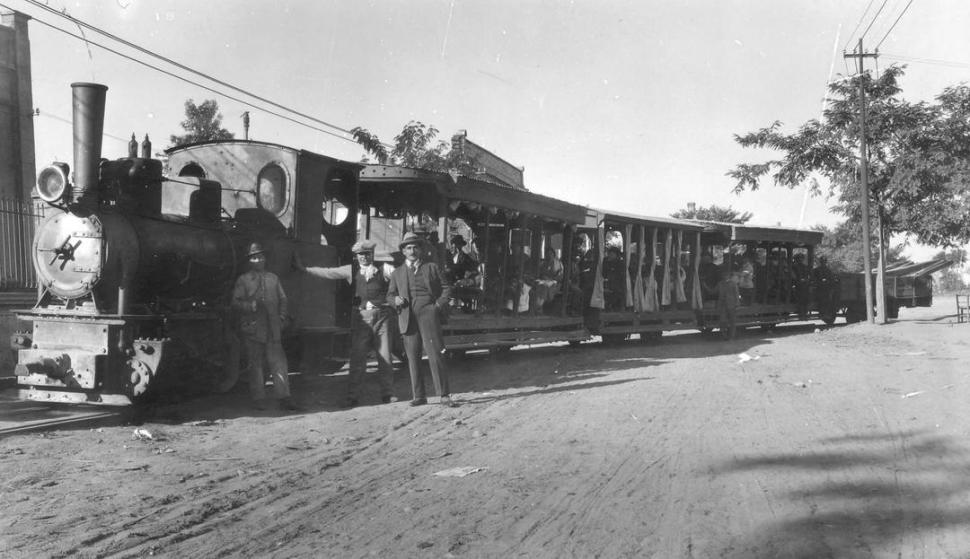
Ready for departure at Plaza Alberdi, terminus

The railway started at Plaza Alberdi (the square at the Central Argentine Railway station) and ran west on Calle Santiago del Estero, turned right into Avenida Mitre and followed it until they turned left into Avenida Manuel Belgrano. Here it passed the depot and the workshops. It ran west to the Avenida Ejército del Norte, then turned south along Calle Córdoba (now Calle Don Bosco). On the Calle Aconquija (now Calle Luis Federico Nougués) it ran to the Avenida Mate de Luna, which it followed to the terminus Horco Molle at today's El Corte roundabout at the foot of the San Javier Hill.

== Operation ==
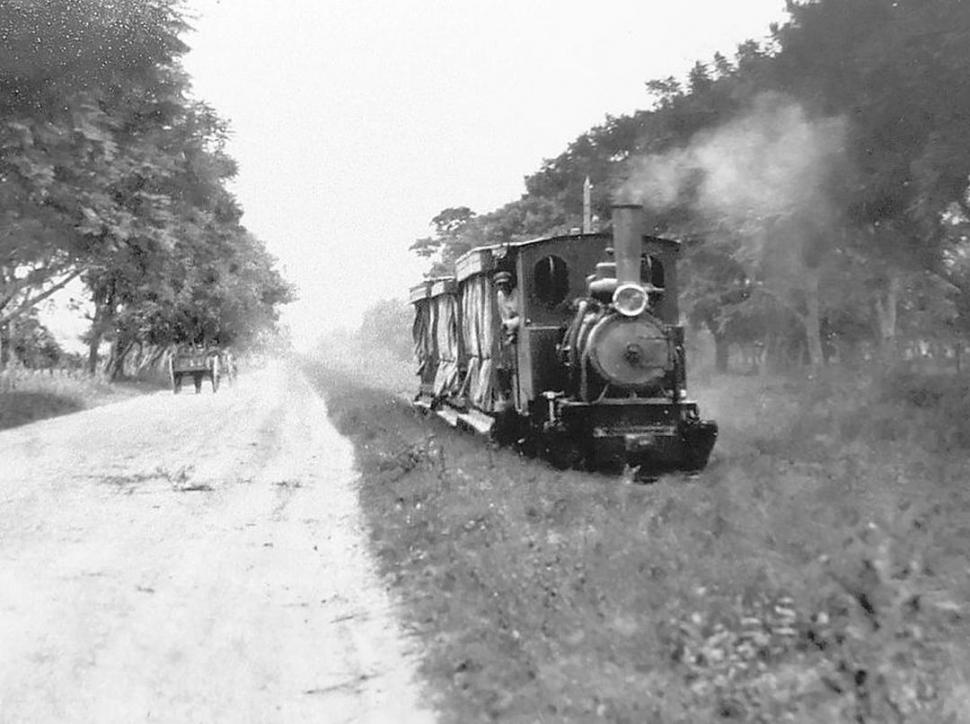
Bad weather ride

Trains ran 6 to 8 times a day. It was colloquially called "Trencito" (little train) or "La Chorbita" (choo choo train). A single trip along the lone took between 45 minutes and one hour. The stations were numbered; some of these numbers are still used colloquially today.

Trains ran on Decauville tracks, that had been also used in the Ferrocarril Económico Correntino, and nowadays in the Rainforest Ecological Train in Iguazú National Park. The locals preferred not to take the train because sparks from the locomotive often fell into the open carriages, damaging clothes.

The rolling stock included four or five steam locomotives and eight passenger and freight wagons. The workshops were located on Avenida Belgrano and Calle Asunción. Although a total of 135,505 passengers had been carried by 1925, the line closed in 1926 due to a lack of profitability.
