= List of microcars by country of origin: F =

== List ==
Country	Automobile Name	Manufacturer	Engine Make/Capacity	Seats	Year	Other information
Finland	Elcat Cityvan	Elcat Electric Vehicles, Järvenpää	Electric motor		1990–2002	Based on Subaru vans
Finland	Wiima	Oy Uusi Autokoriteollisuus Ab, Helsinki	296cc		1956–1958	Prototype
France	Aerocarene 700	Aerocarene, Paris	AMC 684 cc	2	1947	A prototype shown at the Salon de l'auto
France	Aixam 325	Groupe AIXAM-MEGA, Aix-les-Bains, Savoie			1983-	
France	Aixam 300	Groupe AIXAM-MEGA, Aix-les-Bains, Savoie	276 cc	2		
France	Aixam 400	Groupe AIXAM-MEGA, Aix-les-Bains, Savoie				
France	Aixam 500	Groupe AIXAM-MEGA, Aix-les-Bains, Savoie				
France	Aixam 600	Groupe AIXAM-MEGA, Aix-les-Bains, Savoie				
France	Ardex	Ardex, Nanterre			1934–1958	Ardex produced a pedal car in quantity, along similar lines to Mochet's Velocar. However, so little is known about the microcars that the company produced that it is possible each example was unique
France	Arola Type 10 / 11 / 12	Arola Sàrl, Lyon-Corbas	Sachs saxonette 47 cc	1	1976–1978	The 3-wheeled Arola Type 11 & 12 are the same as the Type 10 with very minor trim differences
France	Arola SP (Super Pratique)	Arola Sàrl, Lyon-Corbas	Sachs saxonette 47 cc	1	1978–1982	Almost identical to the Type 12, but in pickup truck form
France	Arola Type 14 / 15	Arola Sàrl, Lyon-Corbas	Motobécane 50 cc	2	1979–1982	The 4-wheeled Arola Type 15 is the same as the Type 14 but with opening ventilation panels in the doors
France	Arola Type 16	Arola Sàrl, Lyon-Corbas		2		
France	Arola Compacity	Arola Sàrl, Lyon-Corbas	Motobécane 50 cc	2	1980–1982	The 4-wheeled Arola Compacity is almost identical to the Type 14 or 15 but in pickup truck form
France	Arola Type 18	Arola Sàrl, Lyon-Corbas	BCB, Motobécane or Peugeot 50 cc or BCB 125 cc	2	1981–1983	The Type 18 was also available as the Type 18S with minor refinements
France	Arola Type 20	Arola Sàrl, Lyon-Corbas		2		
France	Arola Type 40	Arola Sàrl, Lyon-Corbas		2		
France	Minoto	Arola Sàrl, Aix-les-Bains	Motobécane or Peugeot 50 cc	2	1982–1983	Arola took over production of this design from Societe BEL-Motors
France	Atlas	Ste Industrielle de Livry (SIL), Paris	175 cc	2	1951	
France	Avolette	Air Tourist Sàrl, Paris	Ydral 175 cc ^{[a]}	2	1955–1957	License built version of the Brütsch Zwerg - Einsitzer with polyester body. Optional hard or soft top^{[b]}
France	Rollera Francais	Air Tourist Sàrl, Paris	AMC 100 cc	1	1957–1958	License built version of the Brütsch Rollera
France	Bellier F85	Ets. J. Bellier, Les Sables-d'Olonne, Vendée	Motobécane 50 cc	2	1980-	
France	Bellier VX550	Bellier Automobiles, Talmont Saint Hilaire, Vendée	Lombardini or Yanmar 505 cc or 523 cc	2	2001	
France	Bellier VX650	Bellier Automobiles, Talmont Saint Hilaire, Vendée	Yanmar 523 cc	4	2001–2005	
France	Divane	Bellier Automobiles, Talmont Saint Hilaire, Vendée	Lombardini or Yanmar 505 cc or 523 cc	2	2001–2005	
France	Inter Autoscooter	Societé Nationale de Constructions Aéronautiques du Nord	Ydral 175 cc	2	1953-1958	
France	Opale	Bellier Automobiles, Talmont Saint Hilaire, Vendée	Yanmar 523 cc	4	2005-	
France	Divane II	Bellier Automobiles, Talmont Saint Hilaire, Vendée	Yanmar 523 cc	2	2005-	
France	Boitel 3 CV Populaire	Automobiles Boitel, Paris	400 cc ^{[c]}	2	1938–1949	
France	Cedre	Société Seve-Cedre, Sainte Croix Volvestre, Ariège	electric motor 5 kW (7 hp)		1975-79	
France	Cedre	Cedre sarl, Sainte Croix Volvestre, Ariège	electric motor 5 kW (7 hp)		1979-	
France	C.G.E. Tudor	Compagnie Générale d’Electricité, Paris	electric motor 5 kW (7 hp)		1941–1946	Built with cast aluminium frame designed by Jean-Albert Grégoire
France	Chatenet	Automobiles Chatenet, Limoges, Haute-Vienne				
France	C.H.S.	SA des Usines Chausson, Asnières, Seine	330 cc	2	1948	
France	Cicostar LC79	C.I.C.O. SA, Limoges, Haute-Vienne	Motobécane 50 cc		1980-	
France	Cicostar Matic	C.I.C.O. SA, Limoges, Haute-Vienne	Motobécane 50 cc or Lombardini 125 cc		1980-	
France	Comtesse	Acoma SA, Angers	Motobécane 50 cc		1978-	
France	Citroën 2CV	Citroën	Various Citroën units from 375 cc to 602 cc	4	1948–1990	
France	Citroën Prototype C	Citroën		4	1955-56	A series of prototypes, developing the concept of a streamlined 2CV
France	Decolon	Decolon	Ydral 125 cc, 175 cc or 200 cc	2	1957	
France	Delsaux Modulo	Ets N. Delsaux, Guesnain, Douai	Sachs saxonette 47 cc	2	1980–1983	
France	Delsaux Minimax	Ets N. Delsaux, Guesnain, Douai	Sachs saxonette 47 cc	2	1982–1983	
France	Deshais	Automobiles Deshais, Paris 11e	^{[d]}	2	1950–1951	
France	Dolo JB 10	Etablissements B.D.G., Pierrefitte, Seine	Dolo 571 cc	2	1947–1948	
France	D.S. Malterre Type D.S. 125	Ets Malterre Frères, Paris 11e	Ydral 125 cc	2	1955	A prototype shown at the Salon de l'auto
France	D.S. Malterre Type D.S. 175	Ets Malterre Frères, Paris 11e	Ydral 175 cc	2	1955	A prototype shown at the Salon de l'auto
France	Duport Caddy	Ets Duport, Saint-Ferréol, Faverges, Haute-Savoie	Lombardi 510 cc	2	1977-	
France	Duport 511	Ets Duport, Saint-Ferréol, Faverges, Haute-Savoie	Lombardi 510 cc	2+2	1981-	
France	Duport Parco	Ets Duport, Saint-Ferréol, Faverges, Haute-Savoie	Lombardi 510 cc	4	1981-	
France	Electro-Renard	Lyons	electric motor	2	1943–1946	
France	Erad	Sàrl Erad, Aniche, Nord-Pas de Calais			1978-	
France	Faure	Pierre Faure, Paris	electric motor	2	1941–1947	
France	Flipper I	SEAB, Villejuif	Sachs saxonette 47 cc	2	1978–1980	S.E.A.B. also manufactured the bodywork for the Citroën Méhari
France	Flipper II	S.E.A.B., Villejuif	Motobécane 50 cc	2	1980–1984	A version without doors or roof and with larger tyres was also sold under the name Donky
France	GadJet	SA K.V.S.	49 cc	2	1978–1985	
France	Kover	Ste Industrielle de Livry (SIL), Paris	125 cc	2	1951–1952	
France	Mini 2	SA K.V.S.	125 cc	2	1978–1985	
France	Microcar MC1	Microcar SAS, Boufféré	Lombardini 505 cc	2	2003-	
France	Microcar MC2	Microcar SAS, Boufféré	Lombardini 505 cc	4	2005-	
France	Le Piaf	Ste Industrielle de Livry (SIL), Paris	175 cc	2	1951	
France	Ligier Ambra	Ligier, Abrest				
France	Ligier Be Two	Ligier, Abrest				
France	Ligier Be Up	Ligier, Abrest				
France	Ligier Nova	Ligier, Abrest				
France	Ligier JS4	Ligier, Abrest				
France	Ligier Nova	Ligier, Abrest				
France	Ligier Optima	Ligier, Abrest				
France	Ligier X-TOO	Ligier, Abrest				
France	Ligier X-TOO Max	Ligier, Abrest				
France	Mochet 100					
France	Peugeot VLV					
France	Valle Chantecler					
France	VELAM Isetta					
France	Vespa 400					
France	Velocar					
France	Wilam					

== Notes ==
- a. Also advertised in publicity material with Ydral 125 cc or Sachs 200 cc or Maico 250 cc engines. The 250 cc version has four wheels, all others have three.
- b. One other model was listed in publicity material, 'The Avolette Compétition' with streamlined bodywork and a Maico 250 cc engine. It is not known if any were built.
- c. Replaced in 1948 with a 589 cc DKW engine.
- d. Sales literature suggested 125 cc, 250 cc or 350 cc engines were available.
