= Acoma =

Acoma may refer to:

- Acoma (beetle), a scarab beetle genus of subfamily Melolonthinae
- Acoma Pueblo, a Native American pueblo
- Acoma, Nevada, a ghost town
- Acoma Township, McLeod County, Minnesota, US
- USS Acoma, more than one ship of the US Navy
- Acoma Party (Indonesian: Angkatan Communis Muda), a former political party in Indonesia
- ACOMA, a defunct French automobile maker

== See also ==
- Coma (disambiguation)
