= List of microcars by country of origin: G =

== List ==
Country	Automobile Name	Manufacturer	Engine Make/Capacity	Seats	Year	Other information
GDR	Trabant P50 / 500	VEB Sachsenring Automobilwerke, Zwickau	500 cc	4	1959–1963	
GDR	Trabant P60 / 600	VEB Sachsenring Automobilwerke, Zwickau	600 cc	4	1962–1964	
GDR	Trabant 601	VEB Sachsenring Automobilwerke, Zwickau	600 cc	4	1964–1990	
GDR	Zwickau P70 saloon	VEB Automobilwerk Zwickau (AWZ), Zwickau	684 cc	4	1955–1959	
GDR	Zwickau P70 coupe	VEB Automobilwerk Zwickau (AWZ), Zwickau	684 cc	2	1955–1959	
Germany	AWS Shopper	Automobilwerk Shopper GmbH, West Berlin (Rudow)	Glas 247 cc	2	1970–1974	Used chassis and engine from Goggomobile T250
Germany	BMW Isetta Motocoupé (250)	Bayerische Motoren-Werke AG, Munich	BMW 247 cc	2	1955–1957	
Germany	BMW Isetta 300	Bayerische Motoren-Werke AG, Munich	BMW 295 cc	2	1956–1962	
Germany	BMW 600	Bayerische Motoren-Werke AG, Munich	BMW 582 cc	4	1957–1960	
Germany	BMW 700	Bayerische Motoren-Werke AG, Munich	BMW 697 cc	4	1959–1965	
Germany	Brütsch "Spatz"	Egon Brütsch Fahrzeugbau, Stuttgart, Baden-Württemberg	Fichtel & Sachs 191 cc	3	1954–1955	
Germany	Brütsch Zwerg	Egon Brütsch Fahrzeugbau, Stuttgart, Baden-Württemberg	Fichtel & Sachs 191 cc	2	1955–1956	
Germany	Brütsch Zwerg - Einsitzer	Egon Brütsch Fahrzeugbau, Stuttgart, Baden-Württemberg	DKW Hobby 74 cc	3	1955–1956	
Germany	Brütsch Mopetta	Egon Brütsch Fahrzeugbau, Stuttgart, Baden-Württemberg	Fichtel & Sachs 49 cc	1	1956–1958	
Germany	Brütsch Rollera	Egon Brütsch Fahrzeugbau, Stuttgart, Baden-Württemberg	Fichtel & Sachs 98 cc	1	1956–1958	
Germany	Brütsch Bussard	Egon Brütsch Fahrzeugbau, Stuttgart, Baden-Württemberg	Fichtel & Sachs 191 cc	2	1956–1958	
Germany	Brütsch Pfeil	Egon Brütsch Fahrzeugbau, Stuttgart, Baden-Württemberg	Lloyd 386 cc	2	1956–1958	
Germany	Brütsch V2	Egon Brütsch Fahrzeugbau, Stuttgart, Baden-Württemberg	Fichtel & Sachs 98 cc or Maico 247 cc	2	1956–1958	
Germany	Brütsch V2-N	Egon Brütsch Fahrzeugbau, Stuttgart, Baden-Württemberg	Fiat 500 479 cc	2	1958	
Germany	C.A.M.	Carl Amesmaier, Munich	Lloyd 293 cc or Zundapp 598 cc		1951–1956	
Germany	Champion	Hermann Holbein, Blaustein (Herrlingen), Baden-Württemberg	Triumph 196 cc	2	1946	
Germany	Champion Ch-1	Hermann Holbein, Blaustein (Herrlingen), Baden-Württemberg	Triumph 198 cc	2	1949	
Germany	Champion Ch-2	Hermann Holbein, Blaustein (Herrlingen), Baden-Württemberg	Triumph 248 cc	2	1949	
Germany	Champion 250	Champion Automobil GmbH, Paderborn, NRW	Triumph 248 cc	2	1950–1951	
Germany	Champion 250S	Champion Automobil GmbH, Paderborn, NRW	Triumph 248 cc	2	1950–1951	
Germany	Champion 400	Champion Automobil GmbH, Paderborn, NRW	ILO 398 cc	2	1951–1953	See also de:Champion (Auto)
Germany	Champion 400 H	Rheinische Automobilfabrik, Hennhöfer & Co, Ludwigshafen, Rhineland-Palatinate	Heinkel 396 cc	2	1953–1954	
Germany	Champion 500 G	Rheinische Automobilfabrik, Hennhöfer & Co, Ludwigshafen, Rhineland-Palatinate	Heinkel 452 cc	4	1953–1954	
Germany	Condor	Fahrzeugwerk Weidner, Schwäbisch Hall, Baden-Württemberg	Heinkel 677 cc		1957–1958	
Germany	Cuno Bistram	Cuno Bistram	146 cc	1	1954	About 50 cars were made
Germany	DKW F89 Meisterklasse	Auto Union GmbH, Düsseldorf;Ingolstadt	DKW 690 cc	4	1950–1952	
Germany	Dornier Delta	Dornier GmbH, Munich, Bavaria	ILO 197 cc	4	1955	Prototype designed by Claudius Dornier with the aim of diversifying Dornier's range of products. This design formed the basis for the Zündapp Janus
Germany	Dornier Delta II	Dornier GmbH, Munich, Bavaria	Glas 392 cc	2	1969	Prototype
Germany	Dornier Delta II G	Dornier GmbH, Munich, Bavaria	Steyr-Daimler-Puch 493 cc	2	1971	Prototype
Germany	Dornier Delta 2e	Dornier GmbH, Munich, Bavaria	electric motor	2	1972	Prototype
Germany	Econom "Teddy"	Econom-Fahrzeugbau, Hellmuth Butenuth, Spandau, Berlin	ILO 245 cc	2+1 in a dicky seat	1950	Prototype, only three produced See also de:Econom
Germany	Fend Flitzer	Fend Kraftfahrzeug GmbH, Rosenheim	Victoria 38 cc	1	1948–1949	About 30 cars produced
Germany	Fend Flitzer	Fend Kraftfahrzeug GmbH, Rosenheim	Fichtel & Sachs 98 cc	1	1949–1950	98 cars produced
Germany	Fend Flitzer	Fend Kraftfahrzeug GmbH, Rosenheim	Riedel 98 cc	1	1950–1951	154 cars produced. Work had commenced on a two-seater model when the company joined forces with Messerschmitt. The car eventually appeared as the Messerschmitt KR175
Germany	FMR Tg500	Fahrzeug- und Maschinenbau GmbH, Regensburg	Fichtel & Sachs 494 cc (30.1 cu in)	2 (tandem)	1958–1961	Often erroneously referred to as the Messerschmitt TG500 or the Messerschmitt Tiger. FMR had the rights to continue using the Messerschmitt name and logo on the KR200 when they took over production, but did not have the rights to use them on any other vehicle.
Germany	Fuldamobil					Also made under licence in Argentina (as the Bambi), Chile (as the Nobel), Netherlands (as the Bambino), South Africa, Sweden (as the Fram King Fulda), Greece (as the Attica and also the Alta, India (as the Scootacar) and United Kingdom (as the Nobel).
Germany	Goggomobil	Glas				
Germany	Goliath					
Germany	Heinkel Kabine					
Germany	Kleinschnittger					
Germany	Lloyd					
Germany	Maico MC 400/H	Maico-Fahrzeugfabrik, Ammerbuch (Pfäffingen), Baden-Württemberg	Heinkel 396 cc	2	1955–1956	
Germany	Maico MC 400 G	Maico-Fahrzeugfabrik, Ammerbuch (Pfäffingen), Baden-Württemberg	Heinkel 452 cc	4	1955–1956	
Germany	Maico MC 400/4	Maico-Fahrzeugfabrik, Ammerbuch (Pfäffingen), Baden-Württemberg	Heinkel 396 cc	4	1956-1956	
Germany	Maico MC 500/4	Maico-Fahrzeugfabrik, Ammerbuch (Pfäffingen), Baden-Württemberg	Heinkel 452 cc	4	1956–1957	
Germany	Maico 500 Sport	Maico-Fahrzeugfabrik, Ammerbuch (Pfäffingen), Baden-Württemberg	Heinkel 452 cc	2	1957	
Germany	Messerschmitt KR175	Messerschmitt AG	Fichtel & Sachs 174 cc (10.6 cu in)	2 (tandem)	1953–1955	Briefly assembled under license by Mi-Val of Brescia, Italy as the Mi-Val Mivalino
Germany	Messerschmitt KR200	Messerschmitt AG; Fahrzeug- und Maschinenbau GmbH, Regensburg (FMR)	Fichtel & Sachs 191 cc (11.7 cu in)	2 (tandem)	1955–1964	Messerschmitt sold their factory to FMR in 1956. FMR retained the right to use the Messerschmitt name and logo on the KR200.
Germany	Meyra					
Germany	NSU Prinz	NSU Motorenwerke AG				
Germany	Smart EV					
Germany	Smart Fortwo					
Germany	Smart Roadster					
Germany	Spatz					
Germany	TWIKE		electric motor			earlier from Switzerland
Germany	Zündapp Janus					
Greece	Alta 200	Alta Inc, Athens	Heinkel 198 cc	2+2	1968–1974	Based on the Fuldamobil S7 with changes to styling
Greece	Attica 200	Bioplastic S.A, Moschato, Athens	Heinkel 198 cc ^{[a]}	2+2	1963–1972	Fuldamobil S7 built under licence
Greece	Attica 200 Convertible	Bioplastic S.A, Moschato, Athens	Heinkel 198 cc ^{[a]}	2+2		
Greece	Attica Cabrioletta convertible	Bioplastic S.A, Moschato, Athens	Heinkel 198 cc ^{[a]}	2+2		Beach style car with open sides and with a flat sun-shade roof
Greece	BET 500	Biotechnia Ellinikon Trikyklon, Athens	Fiat 594 cc	5	1973–1975	
Greece	DIM	DIM Motor, George E. Dimitriadis & Co, Athens	Fiat 594 cc	4	1977–1982	Fibreglass bodied saloon based on Fiat 126 mechanicals
Greece	Dimitriadis 505	George Dimitriadis, Athens		4	1958	

== Notes ==
- a. Some cars were fitted with Attica 200 cc, Sachs 191 cc engines.
