= Arola (microcar) =

French microcar manufacturing company

Arola Sàrl
- Company type: Société à responsabilité limitée
- Industry: Automotive industry
- Founded: 1975
- Defunct: 1983
- Fate: Acquisition by Aixam
- Headquarters: Lyon-Corbas, France
- Key people: Daniel Manon
- Products: Microcars

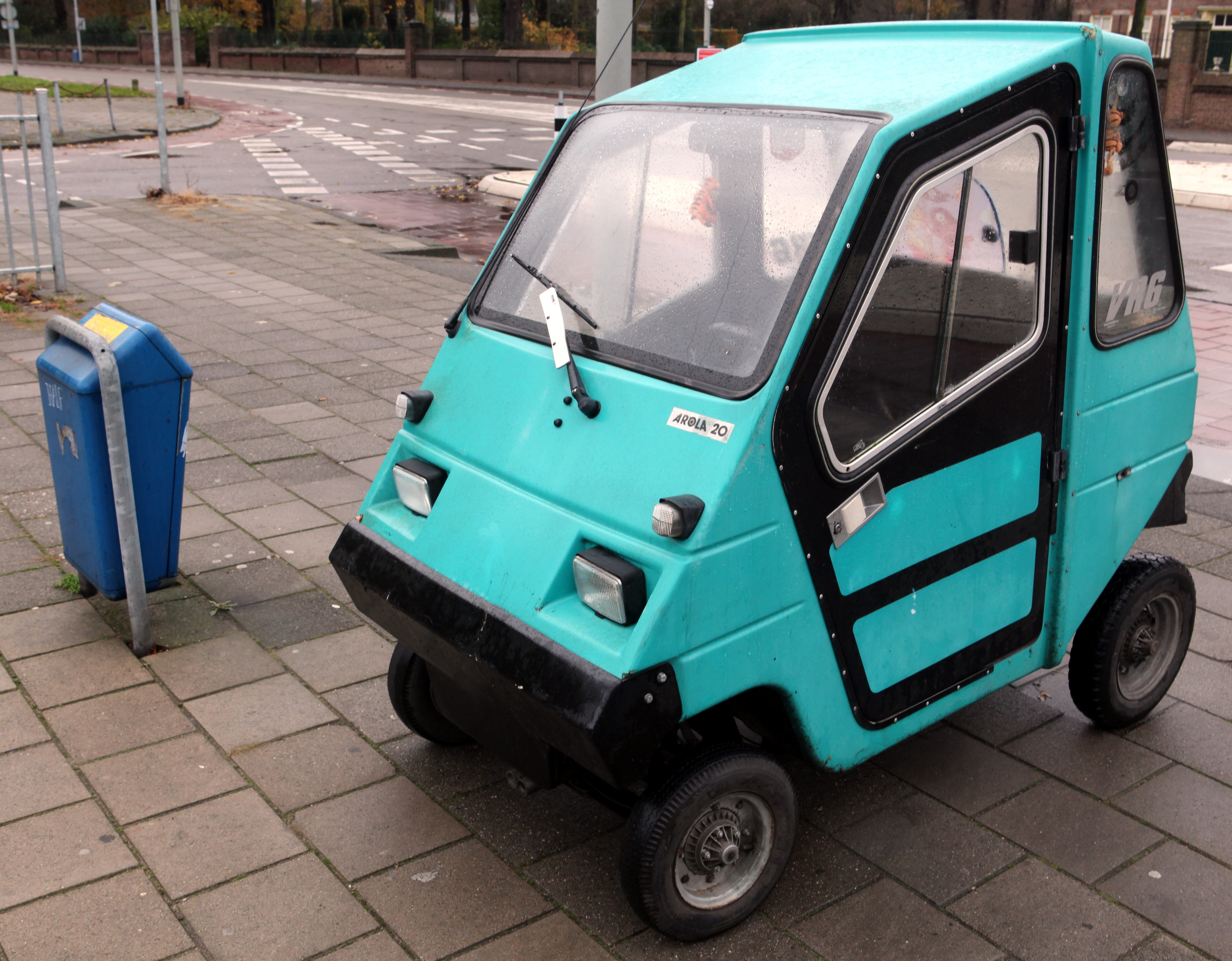
Arola 20

Arola SARL was a small manufacturing company based in Lyon-Corbas, France, which manufactured a range of microcars, designed to be driven without a license. Arola became part of the Aixam group in 1983.

== Models 10, 11, 12 ==
Arola started manufacturing road vehicles with a range of tricycles, models 10, 11, and 12. They shared the tubular frame, front and rear coil suspension, cable brakes, polyester body, and many other components. The driver sat on a flat bench without a back and controlled his cyclecar like a motorbike. General layout met French legislation of the day for permission-free driving. They were single-seater.

The 10 and 11 did not have a speedometer and ashtray, the 11 takes advantage of the storage bag found in the 12. All had electric starters, wipers and the chromed muffler could be transverse or longitudinally mounted.

The main difference was in the power train: the 10 and 11 used a 47 cc (2.85 c.i.) Saxonette single-cylinder engine by Fichtel & Sachs that delivered about 3 HP (2.2 kW), coupled to a two-speed automatic transmission. The 12 featured a Motobécane 50 cc (3.05 c.i.) which had a reverse gear.

While top speed for Models 10 and 11 was about 25 mph (40 km/h), the 12 was good for 40 mph (65 km/h). Detachable and transparent plexiglas doors were available. All models had a length of 72.45 in. (1,840 mm), a width of 42.13 in. (1,070 mm), a height of 61.81 in. (1,570 mm), and weighed in at 242.5 lb (110 kg). Model 12 was built until 1982. Production of the Saxonette-powered vehicles ended earlier.

== Model SP ==
In 1978, Arola presented a somewhat larger variant of the Model 12, called SP. It was 89.567 in. (2,275 mm) long, other dimensions were the same as the 12's. SP meant here not "Sport" but "Super Practical". To meet that purpose, additional length went completely into a tiny pickup bed. It was built until 1982, together with the 12.

== Models 14, 15 and Compacity ==
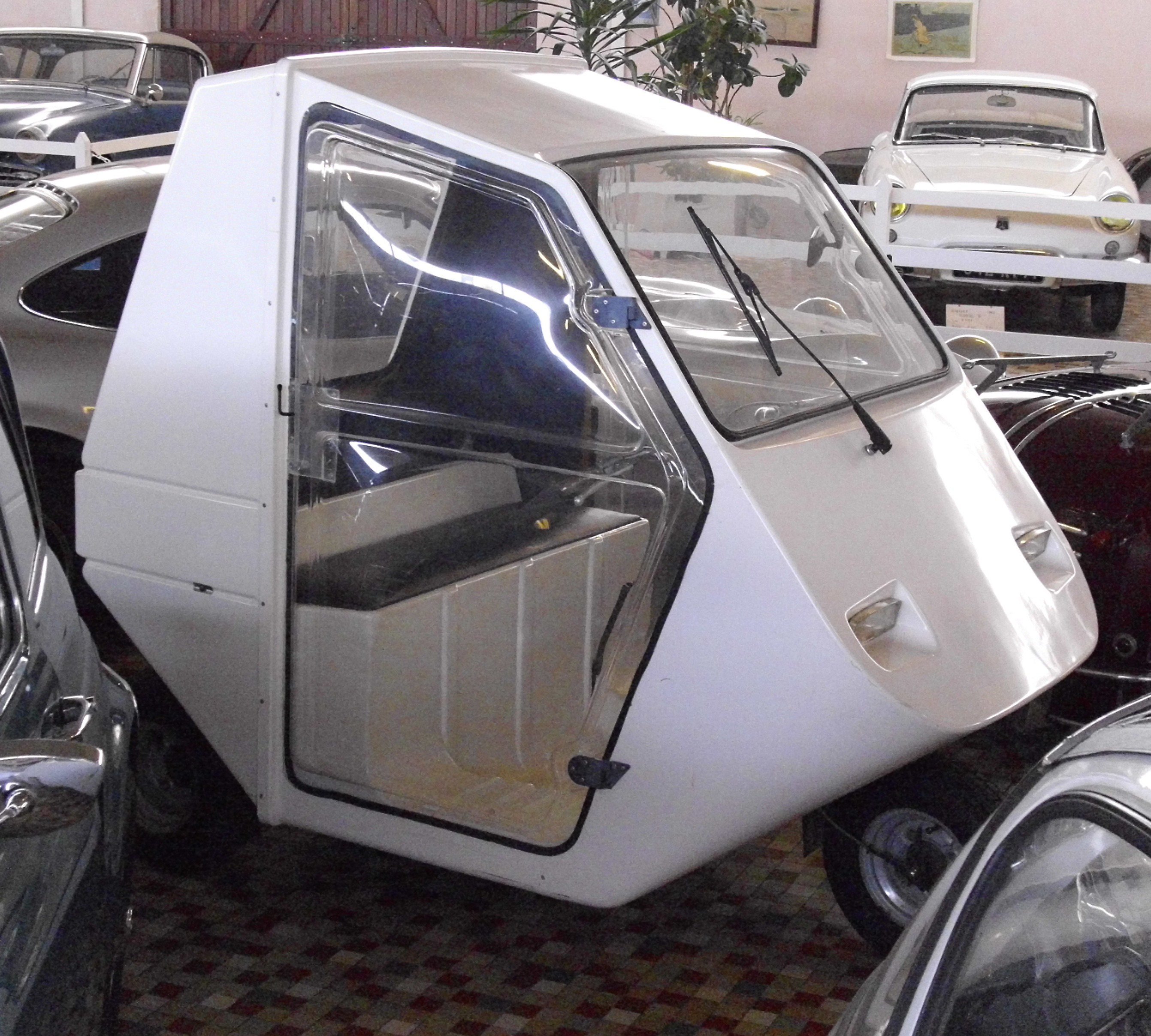
1968 Arola

When Arola presented its first range of quadricycles in 1979, they bore close resemblance with the earlier models. The main difference, of course, was the front axle with conventional steering by a center-positioned steering wheel. This layout was chosen before it became evident that French legislation for this class of vehicles would be changed soon to allow to carry two persons instead of one. The seat "bench" was still here, but now a similar back was added. Plexiglass doors were now standard equipment. Model 14 got them with cooling louvres, Model 15 instead had them with sliding (real) glass inserts. Length was 74.02 in. (1,880 mm), other dimensions were the same as those of the tricycles.

It is not clear if the Compacity saw actual production. Obviously, it served the same purpose with the four-wheelers as the SP did with their three-wheelers. This little Pickup truck was offered officially from 1980 to 1982. Production of the Models 14, 15 and Compacity halted in 1982.

== Models 18 and 20 ==
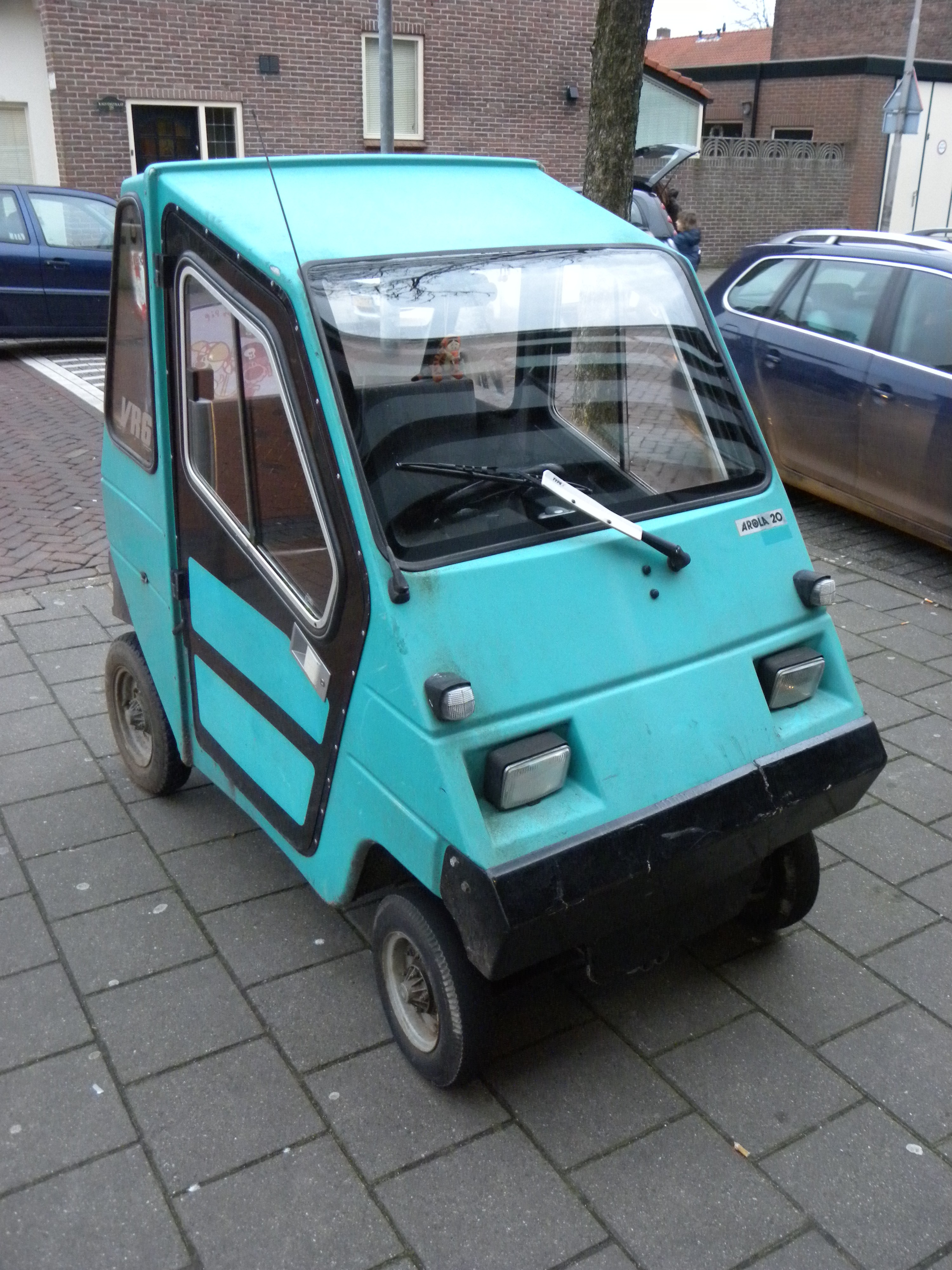
Arola 20

Model 18 was introduced in 1981. It is somewhat larger and has an even more squarish shape than its predecessors. Above all, it is built on an innovative concept with an aluminum-reinforced polyester floor, and a body constructed of an aluminum structure that carries the polyester body panels. There were four engines to choose: Three 50 cc by BCB, Motobécane or Peugeot, and a 125 cc BCB which gave the vehicle a top speed of 40 mph (ca. 65 km/h). The Model 18S was a little bit more sophisticated and had amenities like a clock. Model 18 was 78.47 in. (2000 mm) long, had a width of 49.21 in (1,250 mm) and weighed in at 418.88 pounds (190 kg). All were designed mainly for ease of operation, comfort, and safety, and not to be stylish. The transmission was simplicity itself - a stick, pushed forward for forward motion and pulled backwards for reverse.

== Minoto ==
The Arola Minoto used the same name and body shape as an earlier prototype microcar from Bel Motors International, a short-live offshoot of the Bellier microcar company. The Minoto name is a portmanteau derived from the terms "miniature" and "automobile" as expressed in French language. Aside from taking its predecessors name and shape, the Arola Minoto was completely different, with a molded, self-supporting bodyshell of polyester. The Minoto was powered by a 50 cc engine, either by Motobécane or Peugeot. Later, a Lombardini Diesel with 325 cc (20 cu in) was added. Much more conventional in design than other Arolas, its dimensions were: Length 79.92 in (2,030 mm) width 51.18 in (1,300 mm) and weight 447.54 lb (203.00 kg).

== See also ==
- List of microcars by country of origin
