= AGF =

AGF may refer to:

== Arts and media ==
- AGF, stage name of Antye Greie, German vocalist, musician, composer, producer, and new media artist
- A Good Fight, American band

== Businesses and organizations ==
=== Businesses ===
- AGF, a Japanese marketing company of coffee and a division of Ajinomoto
- AGF (company), a French insurance company
- American General Finance, a former American financial services company, now part of OneMain Financial

=== Military ===
- The anti-governmental forces, an alternative name for Sudan People's Liberation Movement-in-Opposition, a South Sudanese political party and rebel group
- Army Ground Forces, one of three components of the Army of the US during World War II

=== Other organizations ===
- Aarhus Gymnastikforening, a multisports club in the city of Århus, Denmark
- Anglo-German Fellowship, a membership organisation promoting friendly relations between the United Kingdom and Germany, 1935–1939
- Asian Games Federation, the former governing body of sports in Asia
- Avanguardia Giovanile Fascista, an Italian fascist student organization

== Vehicles ==
- AGF (motorcycle), a French motorcycle manufactured 1948–1956
- AGF (light infantry vehicle), an armoured car used by the German army
- A US Navy hull classification symbol: Command ship (AGF)

== Other uses ==
- AgF, chemical formula of Silver(I) fluoride
- Arguni language, spoken in western New Guinea (ISO 639-3 code ".agf")
- Agen La Garenne Airport in Lot-et-Garonne Department, France (IATA airport code AGF)
