= Bel Motors =

French automobile manufacturer

Société Bel Motors
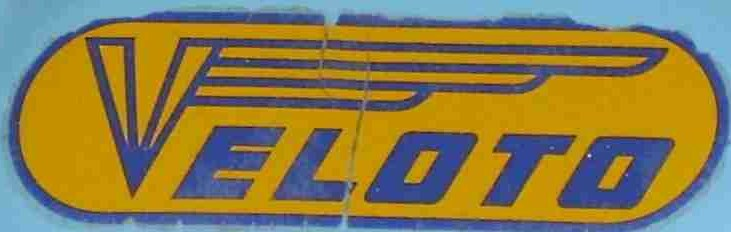

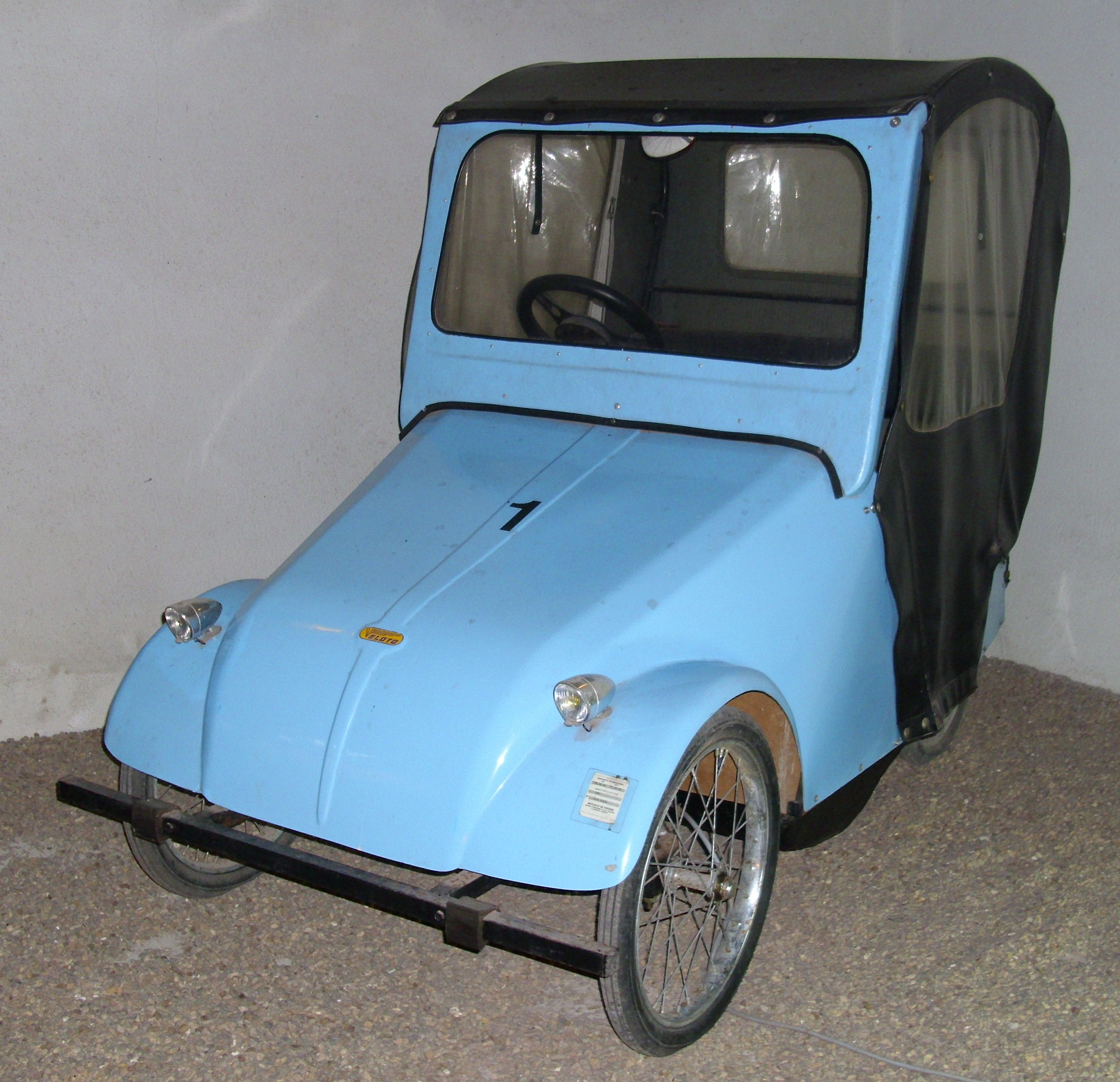
- Founded: 1976
- Defunct: 1980
- Headquarters: Les Sables-d'Olonne, France
- Key people: Jean Bellier
- Products: Light Automobiles

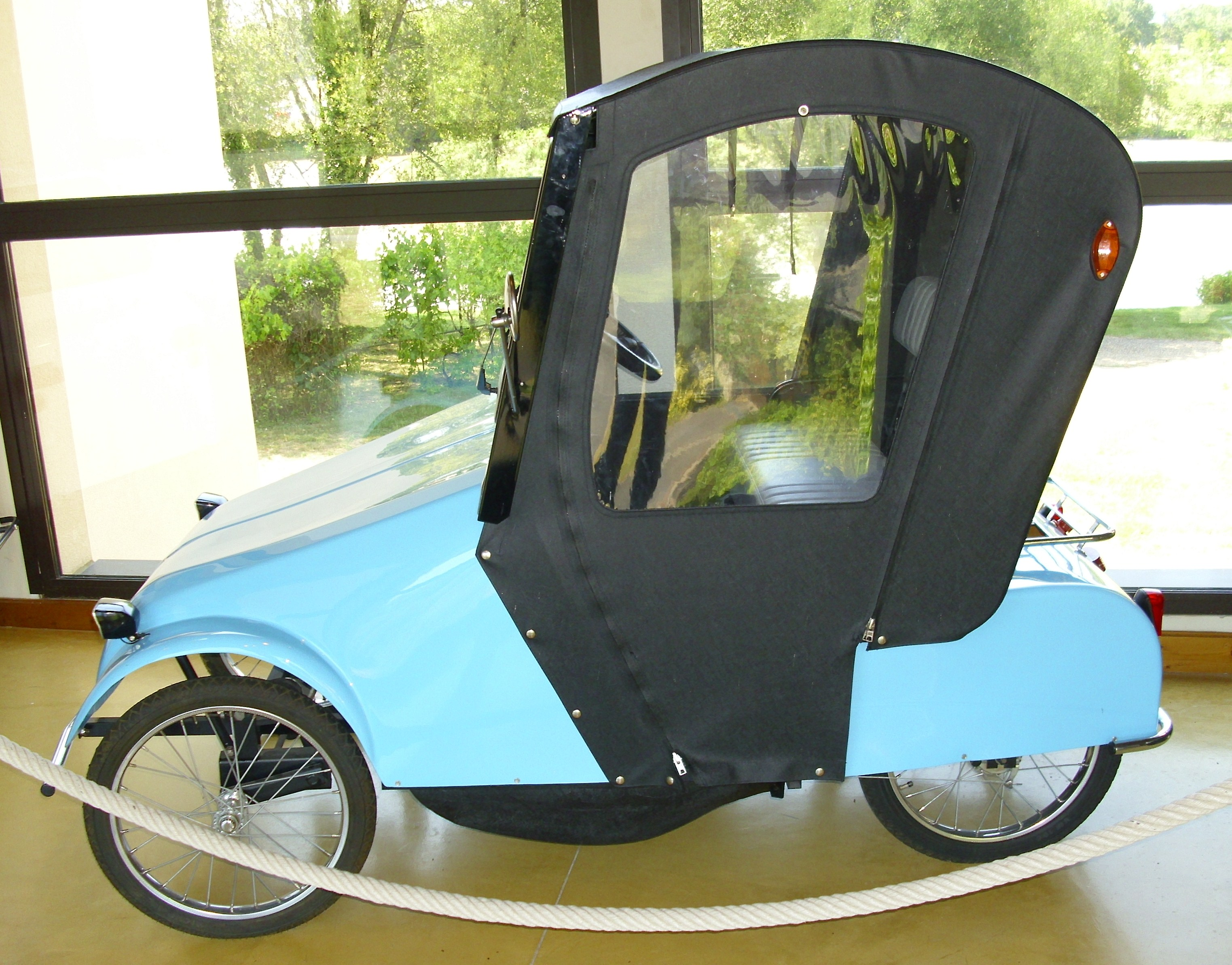

The Société Bel Motors was a French microcar (automobile) manufacturer established at Les Sables-d'Olonne in 1976 by Jean Bellier. The cars used the name Véloto which reflected aspects of their light-weight design, notably in respect of the spoked wheels which would not have looked out of place on a bicycle.

Véloto production ended in 1980 when Jean Bellier founded the Bellier company and started to manufacture vehicles badged with his own name.

== Origins ==
Bel Motors International had manufactured a number of products, including children's pedal cars, before progressing to automobile manufacture.

== Cars ==
The manufacturer's first car was the Super Véloto, described as a "quadricycle" with an auxiliary motor. The motor was a rear-mounted twin cylinder air-cooled 50cc engine from Motobécane which powered the rear wheel via a V-belt and chain linkage. Front suspension was a minimal affair involving rubber rings: suspension at the back was non-existent. Comfort was not a priority and nor was noise suppression in respect of the engine. There were no brakes at the front, but the rear wheels had drum brakes fitted: these were controlled using a hand-lever. The thick leather-look steering wheel was generously padded and provided a contrast with the minimalist approach applied to the rest of the design.

When empty the Super Véloto weighed just 150 kg. The car was 2,120 mm (83.5 in) long and sat on a 1,460 mm (57.5 in) wheelbase.

The Super Véloto's first public outing was at the 63rd Paris Motor Show in October 1976. Some observers spotted a retrospective character in the vehicle which sported simple technical solutions recalling the Vélocar of the early 1940s. The light weight design meant that it could legally be driven by people too young to qualify for a driving licence. Its appeal to young people will have been enhanced by a retail price advertised by the manufacturer in October 1976 of 5,950 francs, although this had risen to 6,850 francs by June 1977.

By the autumn of 1978 there were two version of the Super Véloto advertised. The "Type A" had a listed price of 7,600 francs and the "Type B" was offered at 9,300 francs. The principal difference was apparent when starting the engine. On the "Type A" the driver was required to pedal hard and then connect the engine so that it could be started using the momentum of the movement built up through pedaling. The "Type B" came with an electric starter controlled using an ignition key.

The Véloto C-10 S followed in 1979.

In 1980 the Minoto was exhibited. This featured polyester bodywork strengthened with aluminium, supported by a conventional steel frame, but nothing more was heard of this vehicle. The name Minoto did, however, return on a lightweight vehicle produced by the aluminium Arola during their final two years of independence, 1982 and 1983, but the Arola Minoto was not technically related to the earlier Minoto design from Bel Motors.
