= Avolette =

Avolette 125 and Avolette 150
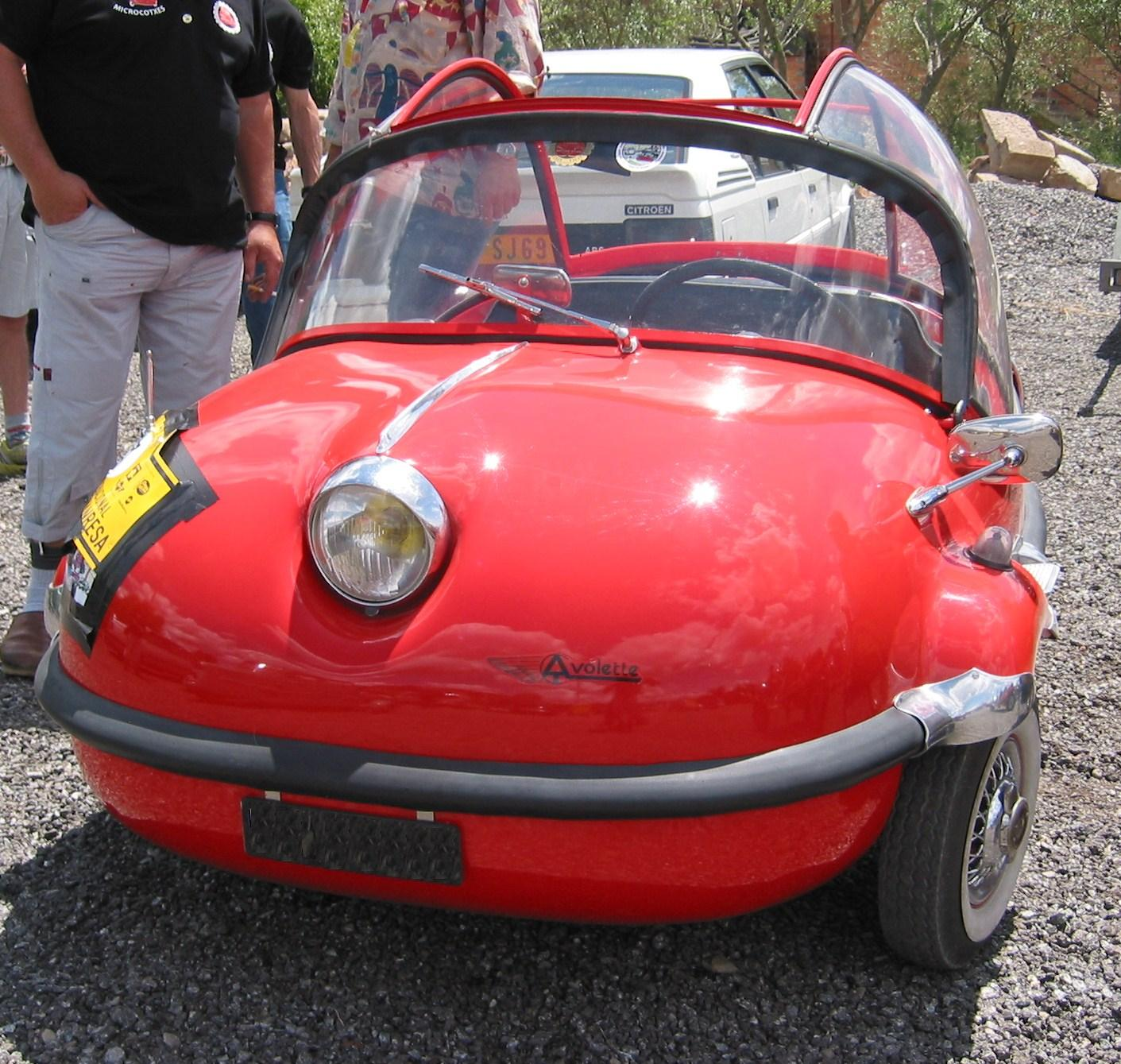

Overview
- Manufacturer: Société Air Tourist
- Production: 1955–1958

Body and chassis
- Class: cycle-car
- Body style: open-topped two-seater with detachable canvas top
- Layout: RR layout

Powertrain
- Engine: single-cylinder 125cc or 150cc or 250cc from various suppliers

Dimensions
- Wheelbase: 1,540 mm (61 in)
- Length: 2,710 mm (106.7 in)
- Width: 1,420 mm (55.9 in)
- Height: 1,210 mm (47.6 in) (with top)

Avolette is a former French auto-maker.

== History ==
The Société Air Tourist company, with its little factory at Paris in the rue de Ponthieu, began production of a small three-wheeled car in 1955. Production probably never progressed beyond the prototype stage and ended in 1958.

== The car ==
There was a single model, manufactured under license from Brütsch of Stuttgart. The car featured three wheels, with the single wheel at the back. Also at the back was a single-cylinder engine of between 125 cc und 250 cc. Engines came from various suppliers including Lambretta, Maico, Sachs and Ydral.
