= USS Acoma =

USS Acoma has been the name of more than one United States Navy ship, and may refer to:

- USS Acoma (SP-1228), a patrol boat in commission from 1917 to 1918
- USS Acoma (YTB-701), tug in service from 1946 to 1985
