= AGF (motorcycle) =

- Production: 1948–1956
- Class: Motorcycle
- Engine: 123 cc, 173 cc Ydral

The AGF was a small motorcycle manufactured in France between 1948 and 1956 by Andre and George Faizant, who amalgamated their initials to form the company name. The AGF used Ydral engines of 123 cc and 173 cc.

In media — In Ni vu, ni connu (1958, France) this motorcycle is owned by Arabella de Chaville, who came from the city of the landowner's daughter.
