= Spatz (automobile) =

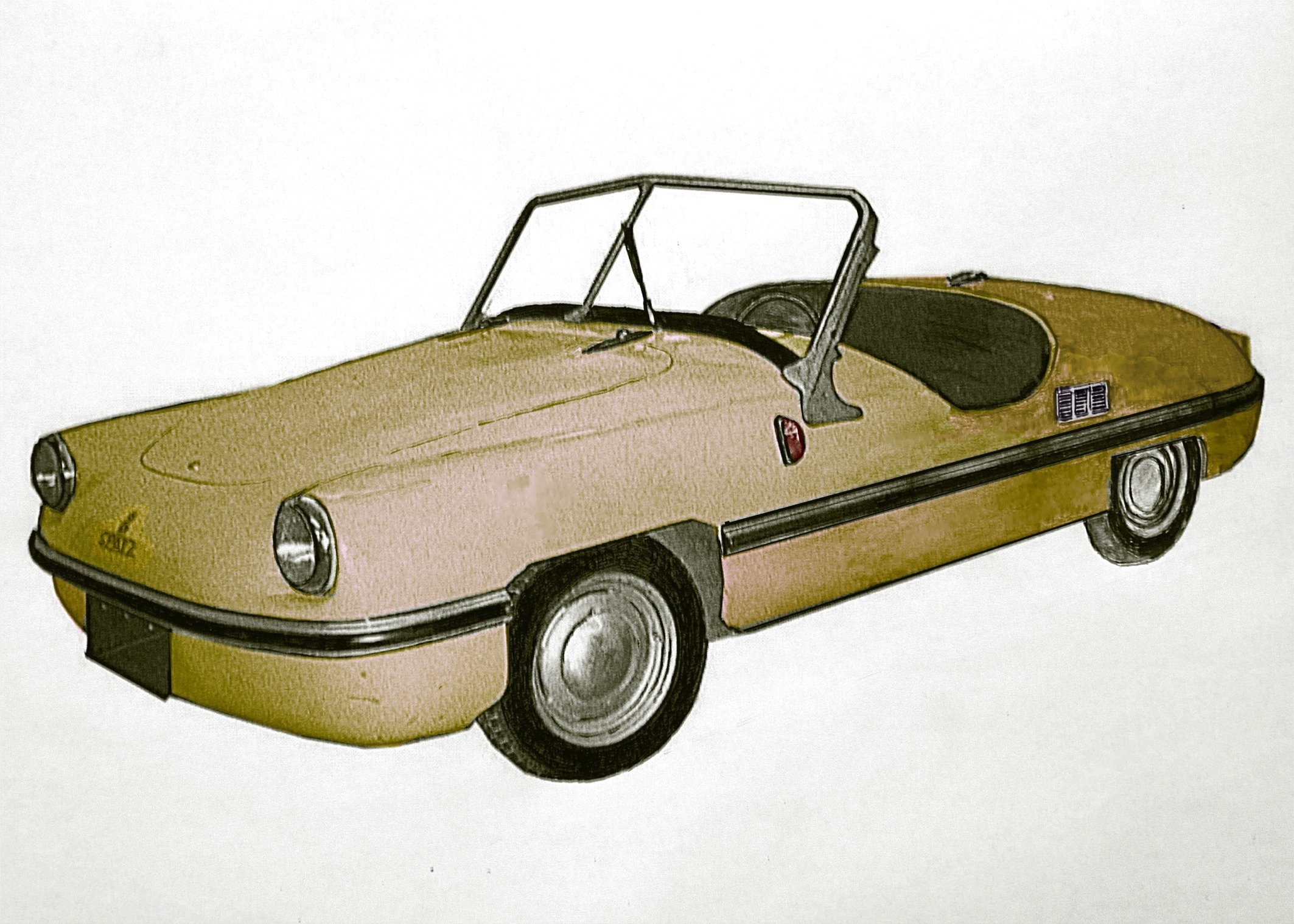
1956 Spatz

The Spatz (German for sparrow), later renamed the Victoria 250, is a four-wheeled microcar that was built between 1956 and 1958.

The car was originally conceived by Egon Brütsch as the Brütsch 200 "Spatz" a fiberglass three-wheeler with the suspension of the front wheels and the rear wheel attached directly to the body shell. As such the car's engineering proved unsound and trial runs on rough roads led to severe cracks in the bodywork.

Harald Friedrich, managing partner of Alzmetall P. Meier & Friedrich GmbH in Altenmarkt an der Alz, acquired the license from Brütsch to build the "Spatz" and in July 1956 with the Victoria works as a partner, founded the Bayerische Autowerke GmbH (BAG) in Traunreut.

Because of the deficiencies in the original design, Friedrich asked the then 77-year-old Hans Ledwinka, the former Tatra engineer, to design a robust chassis for the car. The result was a central tube frame and four wheels – in contrast to the original three-wheeled Brütsch. Friedrich then saw himself no longer obligated to pay royalties to Brütsch, which led to a court case, which Friedrich won. The judges recognising that the original Brütsch construction was both useless and dangerous.

The fiberglass bodywork resembled a sports car, but with only 10 hp (7 kW) was too underpowered to qualify as such, no matter how light it was. The cloth top was erected from inside the car. Reverse was, like for the Messerschmitt KR200, by running the engine backward (or by physically picking it up). The car was mechanically similar to the KR200 but with a single bench seat for two or three people sitting beside each other.

The engine size was increased from 200 to 250 cc. 1,588 were built between 1956 and 1958, 859 as "Spatz", 729 as "Victoria 250".

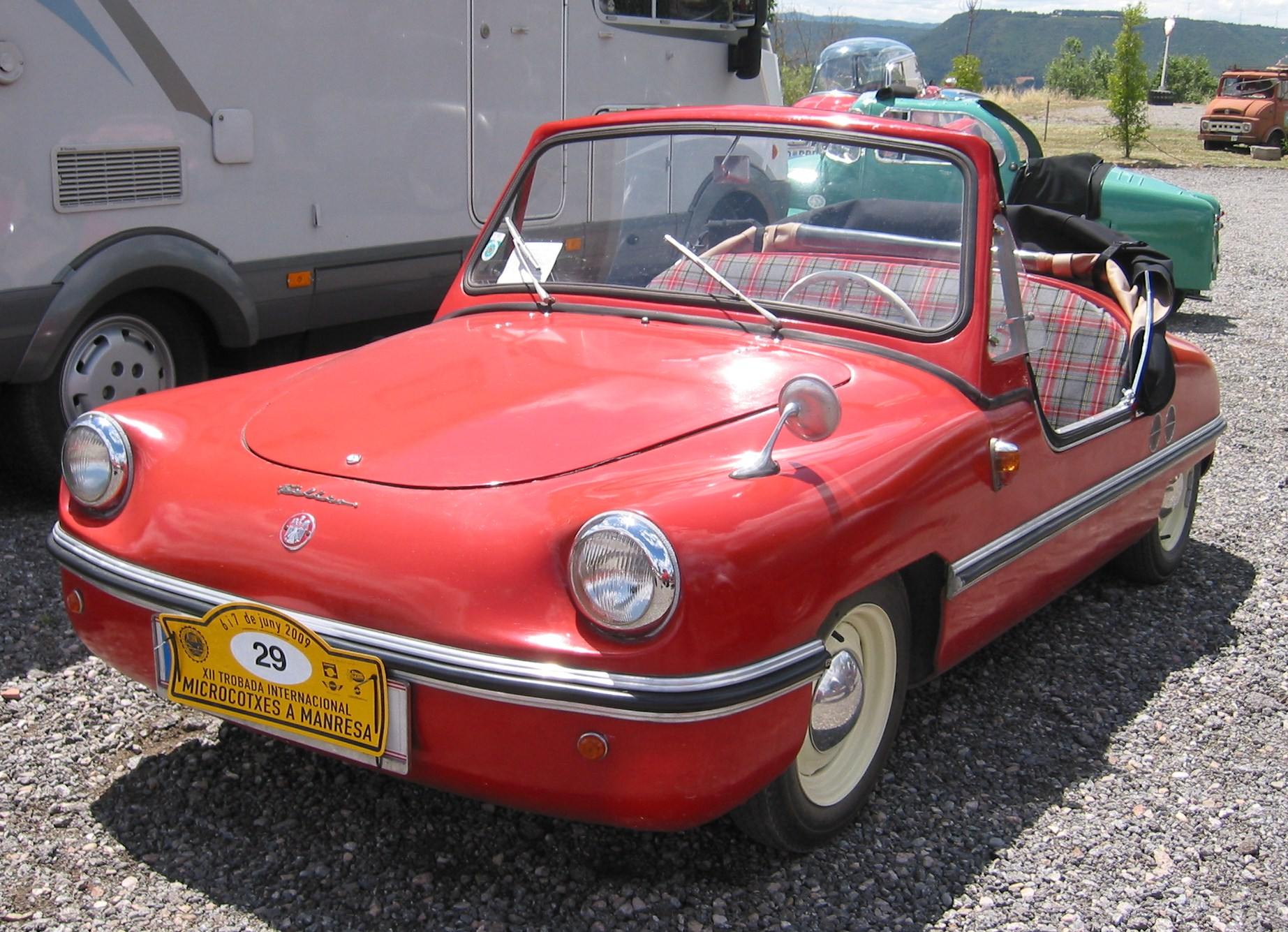
1957 Victoria 250.
