= ACOMA =

ACOMA (Ateliers de Construction de Matériaux) are a French microcar maker that operated between 1972 and 1984. The cars were designed by Émile Boussereau from Villeneuve-la-Comtesse and produced in Laval from 1970 to 1972 after which manufacturing moved to Saint-Barthélemy-d'Anjou, near Angers, until production stopped in 1984.

== History ==
Boussereau was the local mechanic at Villeneuve-la-Comtesse and had been asked in 1970 by a young disabled person to make a car to get around town. He created the Comtesse. Acoma became aware of the vehicle and began manufacturing them from 1972 until 1979 as the Mini-Comtesse.

== Models ==
The Acoma microcars were classified as an "L-Category" car in France. These were able to be driven without a driver's license. ACOMA were the largest manufacturer of this category of cars taking about 30% of the market share. The company made six different models during its existence.

=== Mini-Comtesse ===
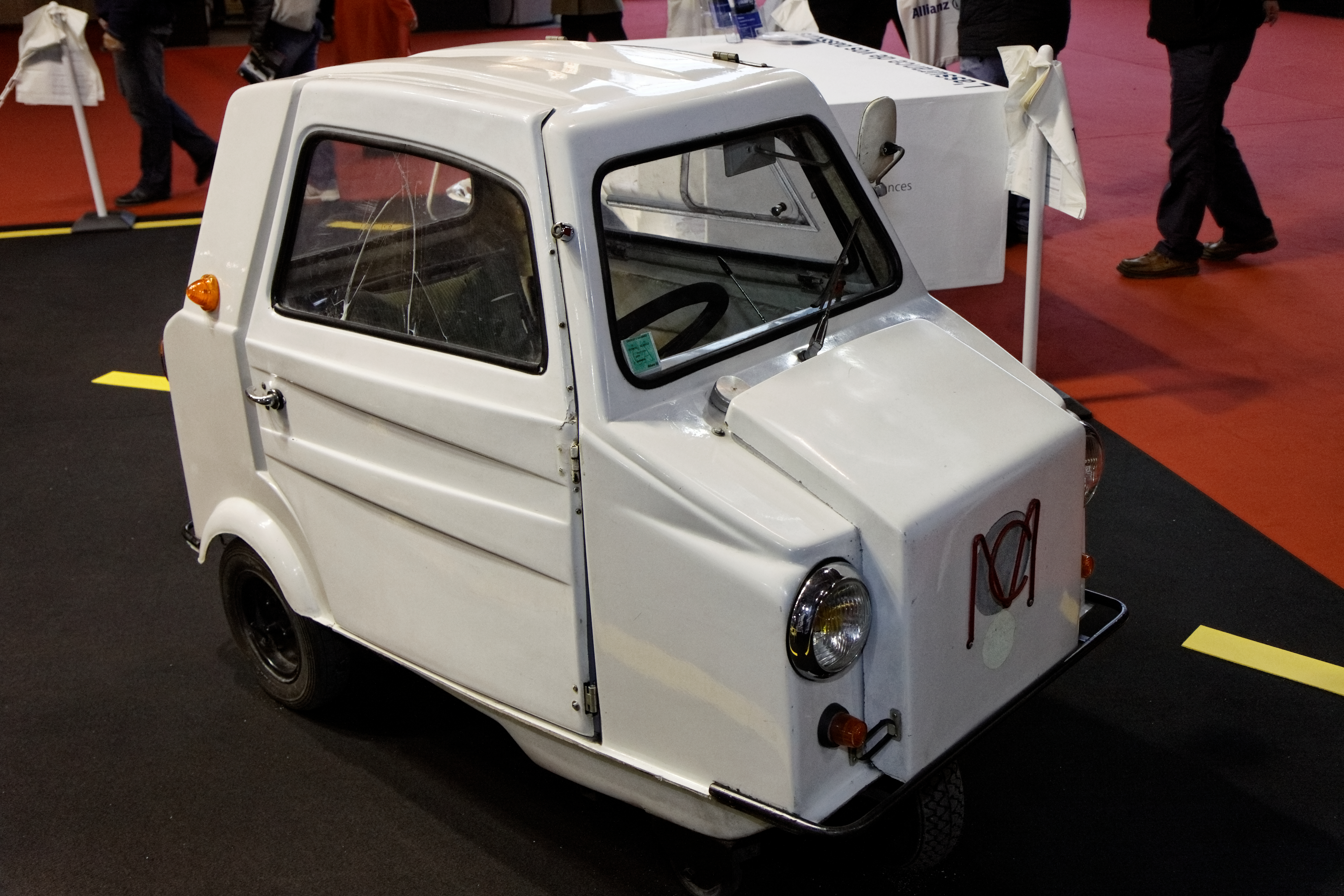
Mini-Comtesse

The Mini-Comtesse was the smallest car produced. It was a single seater three wheeler with two training wheels at the front to improve stability. To comply with the initial "L-category" regulations the car had a pedal which could technically speaking be used to propel the vehicle. Pushing down on the pedal would propel the car about one foot forward, thus meeting the letter of the law. The car had a conventional door on one side and folding gull wing door on the other to allow it to park in extremely confined spaces. The car was front-engine, front-wheel drive by a Sachs air-cooled 49 cc single cylinder, 2-stroke, 3 hp engine connected by a centrifugal clutch to a two speed gearbox with no reverse gear. It had a top speed of 20 mph. Production of the Mini-Comtesse ended in 1979. Paul Clement-Colin says they were powered by a Saxonette 47 cc or Motobécane 50 cc engine.

=== Super Comtesse ===
The four-wheeled Super Comtesse (type 780) began production in 1978 and was powered by a Motobécane engine. It was replaced by the Comtesse Berline type 810 in October 1980.

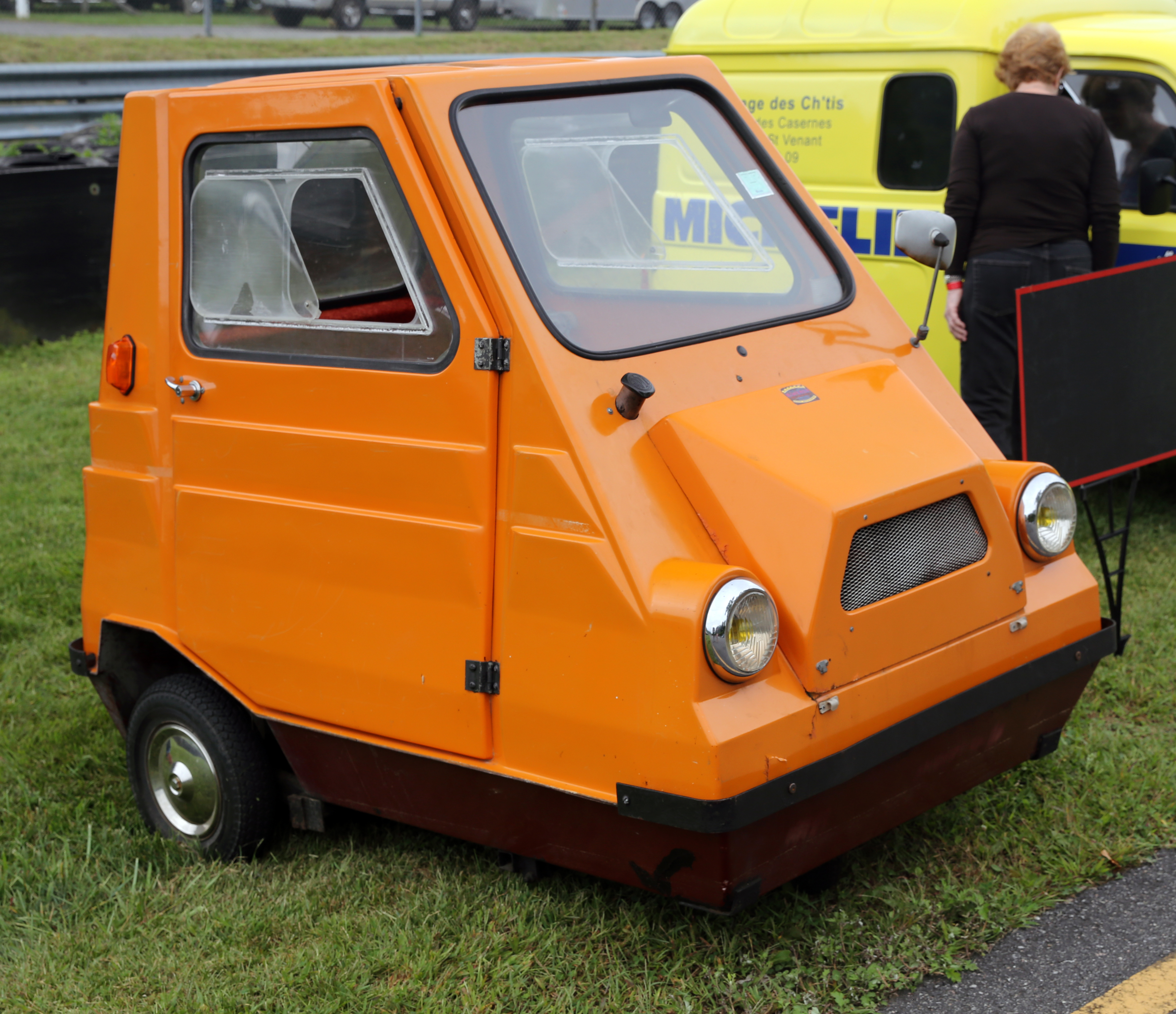
Pre-facelift Super Comtesse

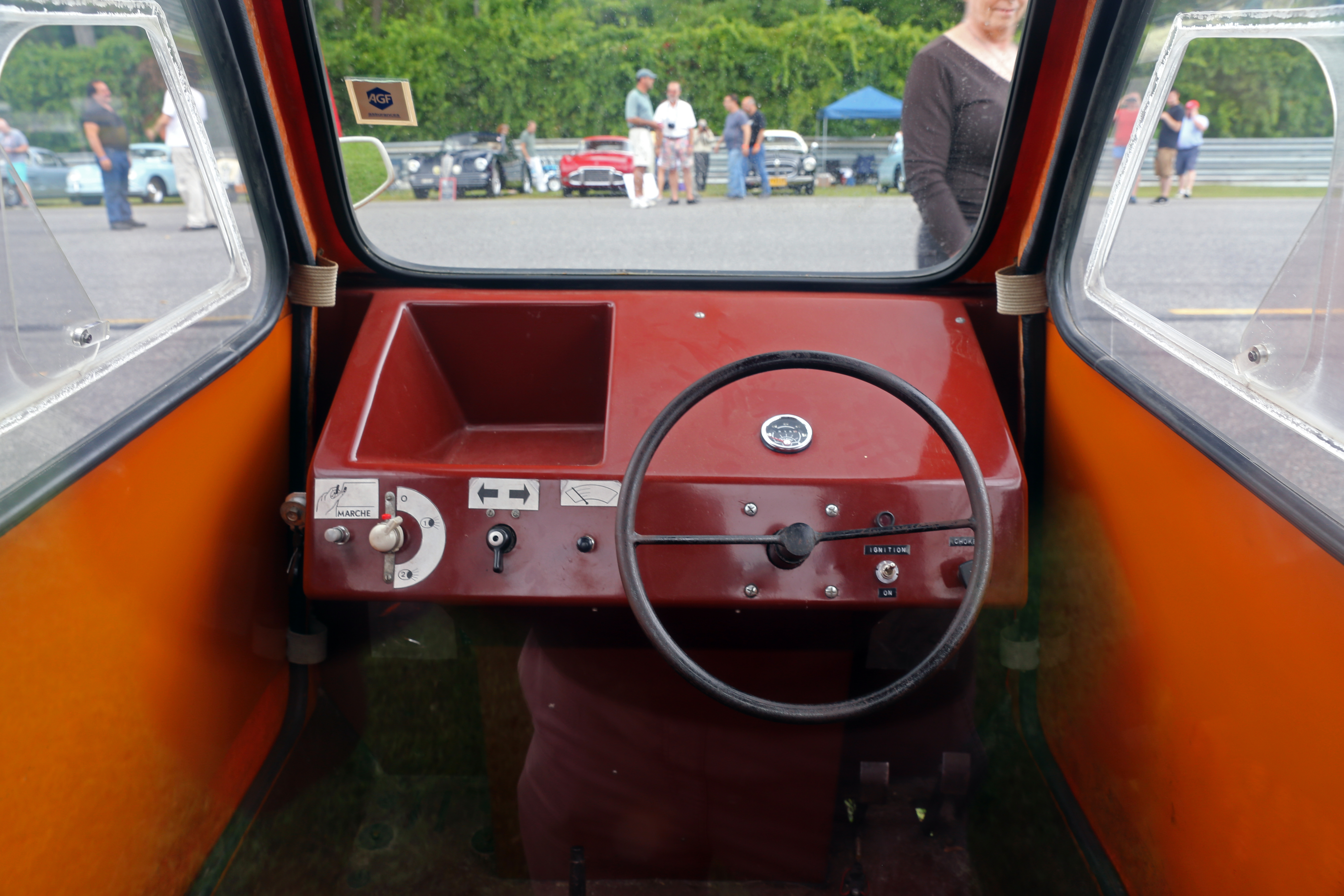
Interior (pre-facelift)

=== Mini-Comtesse Break ===
In 1979 the Break (estate) appeared. Code named type 790, the Comtesse Break in particular is noted for its very odd appearance. On the same chassis as the t seats two people side by side and has a large cargo area behind them. Top speed was limited to 25 km/h (16 mph) for safety reasons.

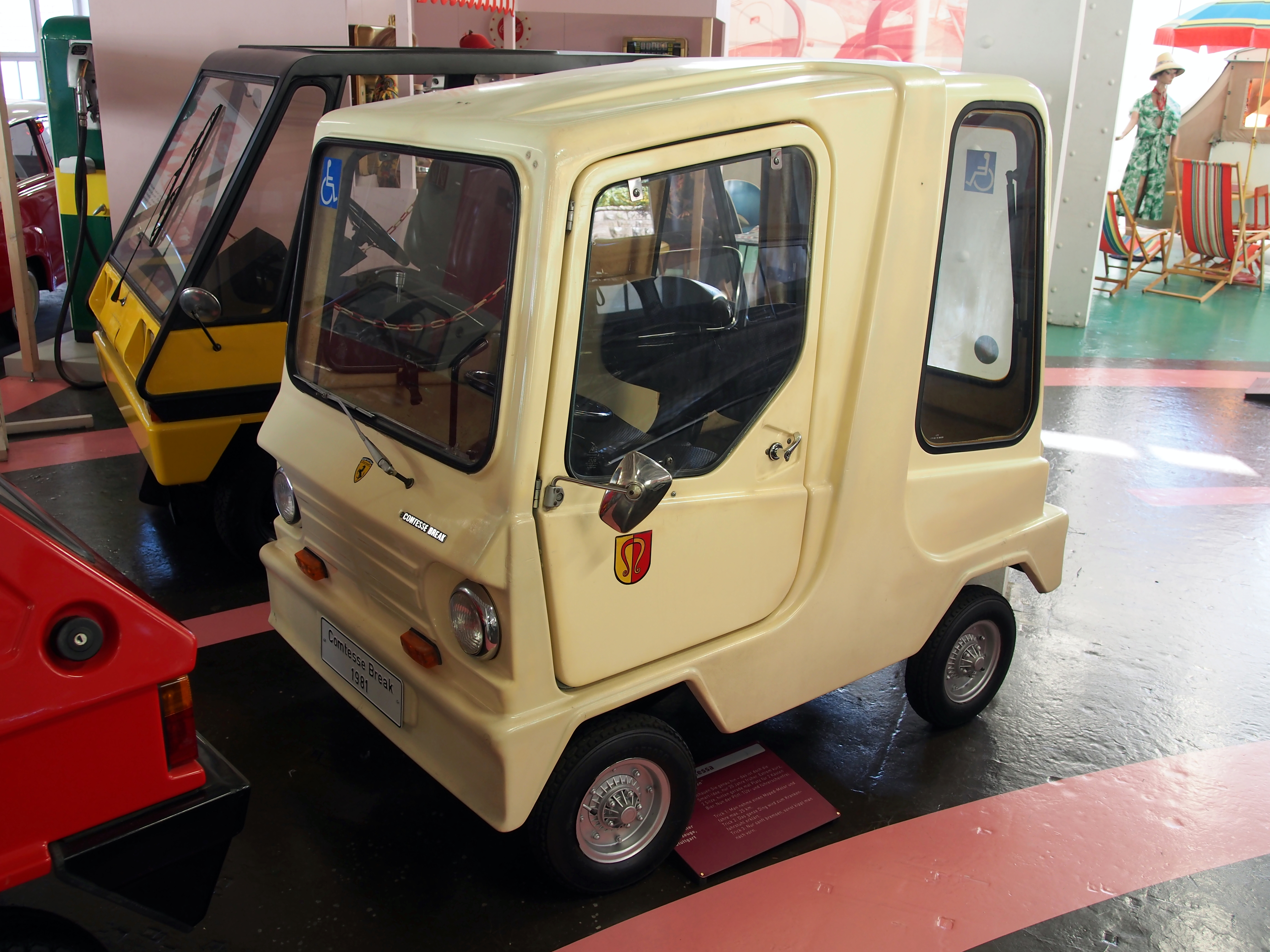
Comtesse Break; front 3/4 view

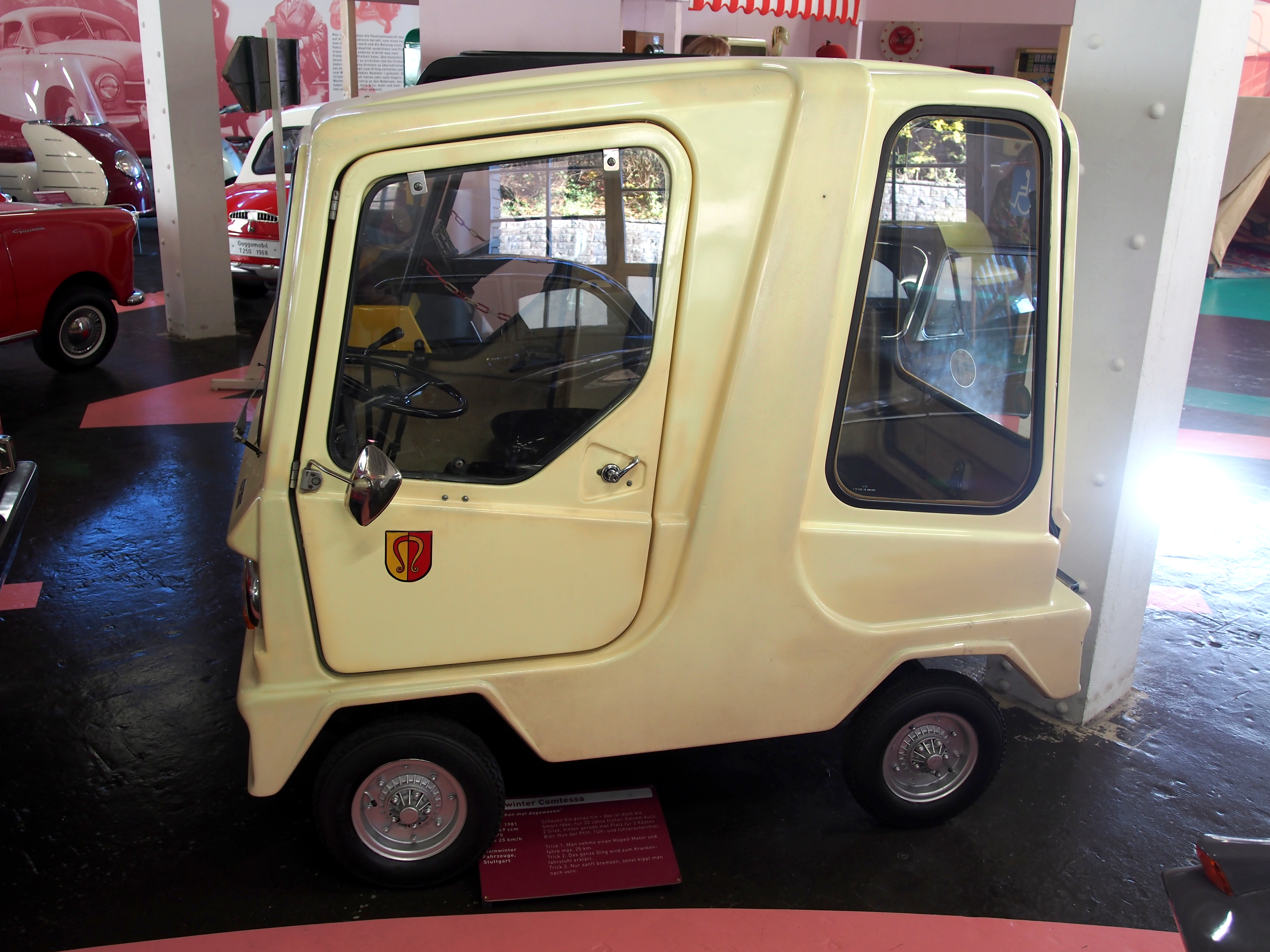
Side view

=== Comtesse Berline ===
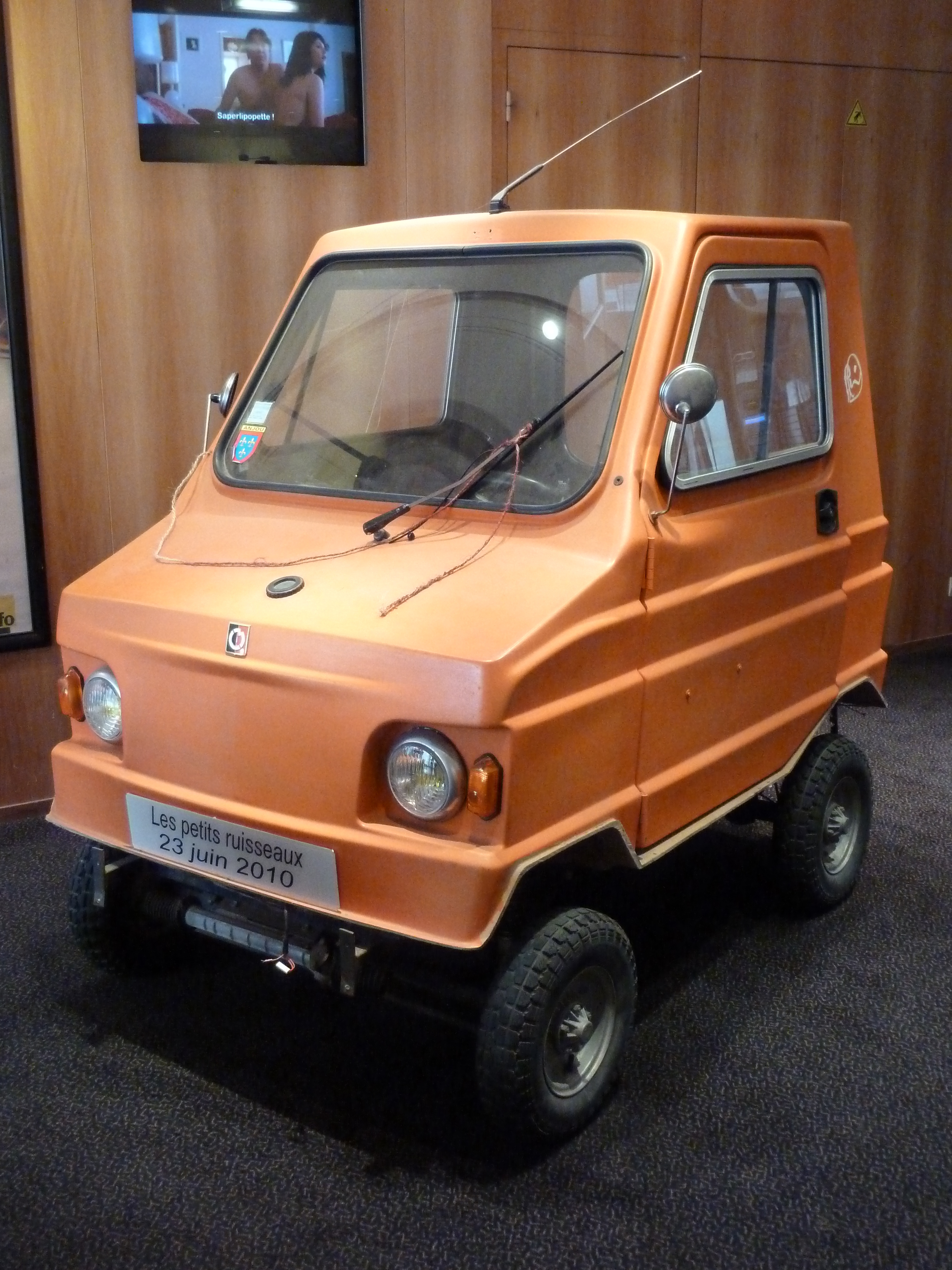
Acoma Comtesse Berline, type 810E

The Comtesse Berline replaced the Super Comtesse in 1980. It remained in production until 1982.

=== Mini-Comtesse Sport, Coupé ===
Two further models were produced in 1980 in conjunction with the Berline: the Sport which was a targa top design, and the related Coupé.

=== Starlette ===
The Starlette, a larger version of the coupé, was released in 1982. It was fitted with the usual 49 cc Motobécane engine.

=== Star ===
Appearing in 1982, the Star has the same body as the Starlette but with a 125 cc engine.

== In culture ==
The French film director Pascal Rabaté occasionally used Mini-Comtesse vehicles in his feature films of 2010 (Les Petits Ruisseaux) and 2011 (Ni à vendre ni à louer). They were shot in the departments of Maine-et-Loire and Loire-Atlantique respectively.
