= Brütsch =

Egon Brütsch Fahrzeugbau
- Company type: Private
- Industry: Automotive design
- Founded: 1950
- Headquarters: Stuttgart, Germany
- Key people: Egon Brütsch; Chairman and Managing Director
- Products: Automobiles

Egon Brütsch Fahrzeugbau, usually shortened to Brütsch, was a German automotive design and automaker based in Stuttgart, Baden-Württemberg.

Brütsch were best known for producing many microcar designs, but only produced small numbers of each design and the primary function of the company appears to have been that of the development and promotion of each design to sell licences to manufacture to other companies.

Between 1952 and 1958, eleven different models of car were manufactured by Brütsch, but the total production of all models by the company is believed to be only eighty-one cars.

Many of the bodywork designs were simple two-piece mouldings of polyester reinforced with fiberglass, bonded at a waistline join, which was then covered by a protective strip. Chassis and suspension design was very rudimentary and after a misguided court action in 1956 by Brütsch against a licensee, at least one of Brütsch's designs was condemned as dangerous. The abbreviated chassis used on the majority of the cars meant that for structural integrity they could not have doors and all these models had low sides to facilitate entry and exit.

== Brütsch 200 "Spatz" or Dreirad-Dreisitzer 1954-1955 ==
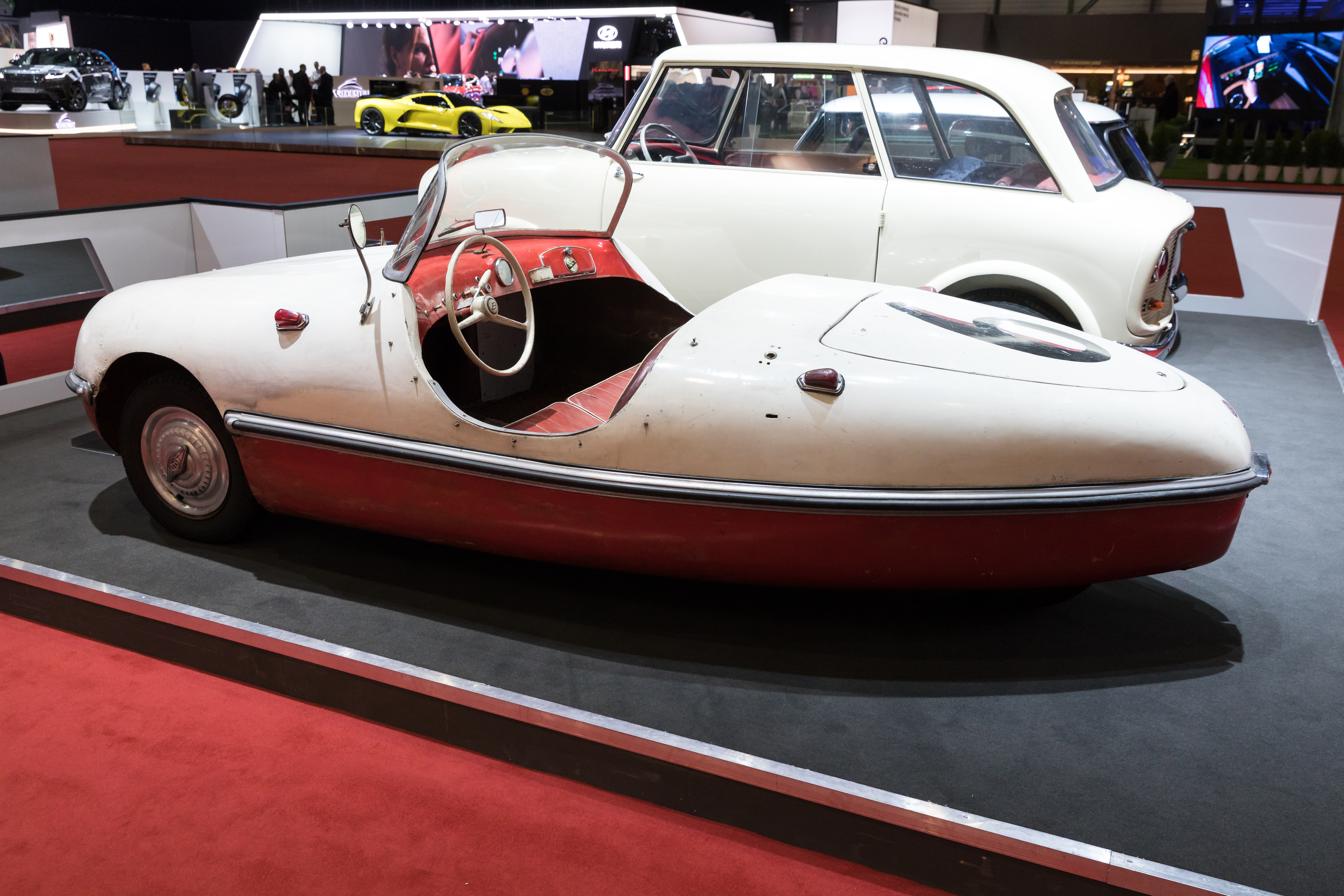
A Swiss-built Belcar

A 3-seater, 3-wheeled roadster, powered by a single cylinder 191 cc Fichtel & Sachs engine driving through a four speed gearbox. Top speed was around 90 km/h (56 mph) and about five cars were produced. Also built under licence by A. Grünhut & Co of Switzerland with minor changes and sold as the Belcar. Another licence was sold to Alzmetall for production by Harald Friedrich GmbH of Germany, but so many faults were found with the original design that their production model, the Spatz Kabinenroller was fundamentally a different car. Because of this Brütsch took Alzmetall to court to ensure payment of his licence fees but lost the case.

== Brütsch Zwerg 1955-1957 ==
A 2-seater, 3-wheeled roadster, powered by a single cylinder 191 cc Fichtel & Sachs engine driving through a four speed gearbox. Top speed was around 85 km/h (53 mph) and twelve cars were produced. Also built under licence by Air Tourist Sàrl of France with minor changes and sold as the Avolette. Only four examples of the 2-seat Zwerg are known to still exist in England and are currently awaiting restoration.

== Brütsch Zwerg - Einsitzer 1955-1956 ==
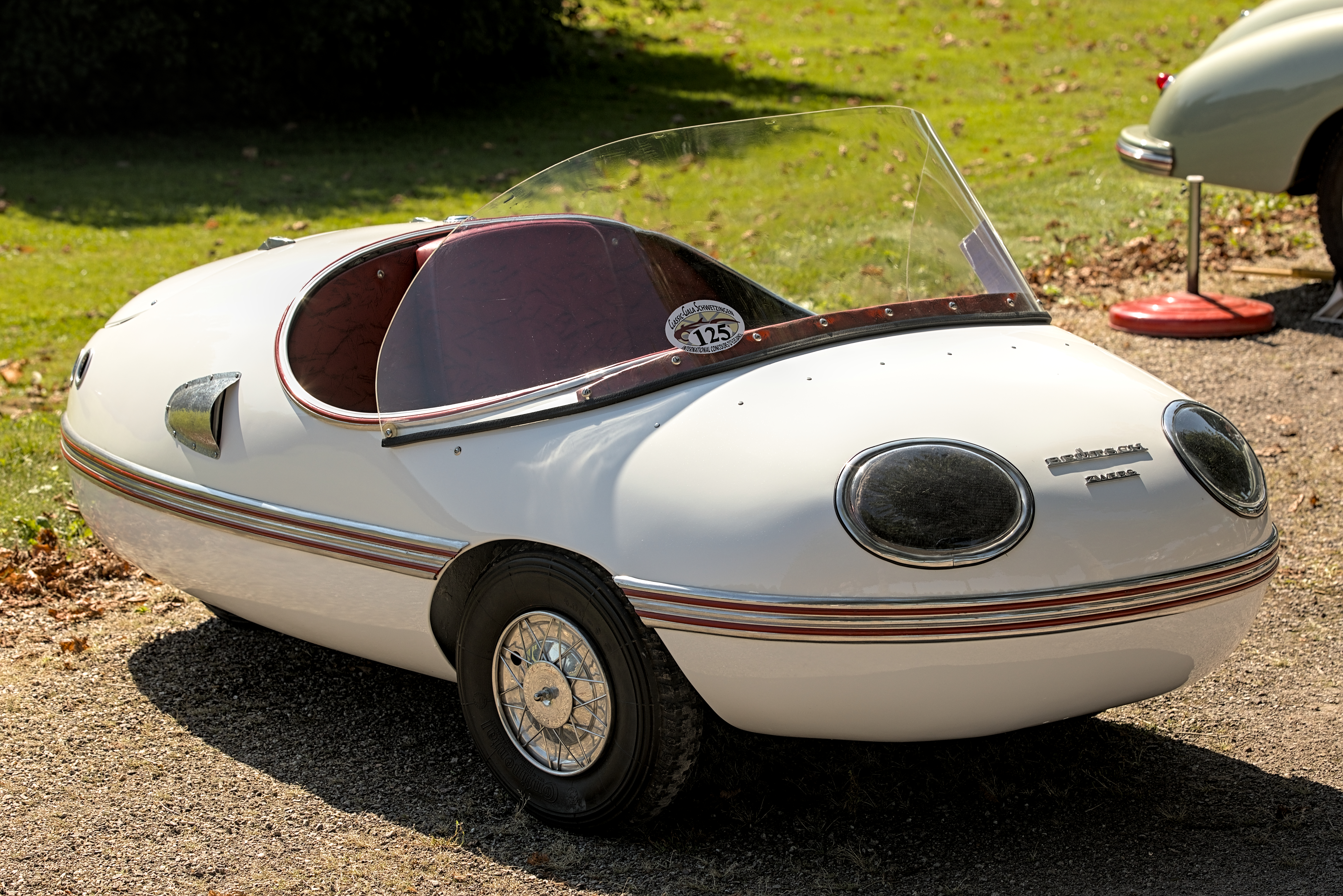
Brütsch Zwerg Einsitzer (1955)

A single seat, 3-wheeled roadster, powered by a single cylinder 74 cc DKW Hobby scooter engine driving through a continuously variable transmission. Top speed was around 75 km/h (47 mph) and four cars were produced. Three surviving cars were discovered in Germany in 2010 and have been restored.

== Brütsch Mopetta 1956-1958 ==
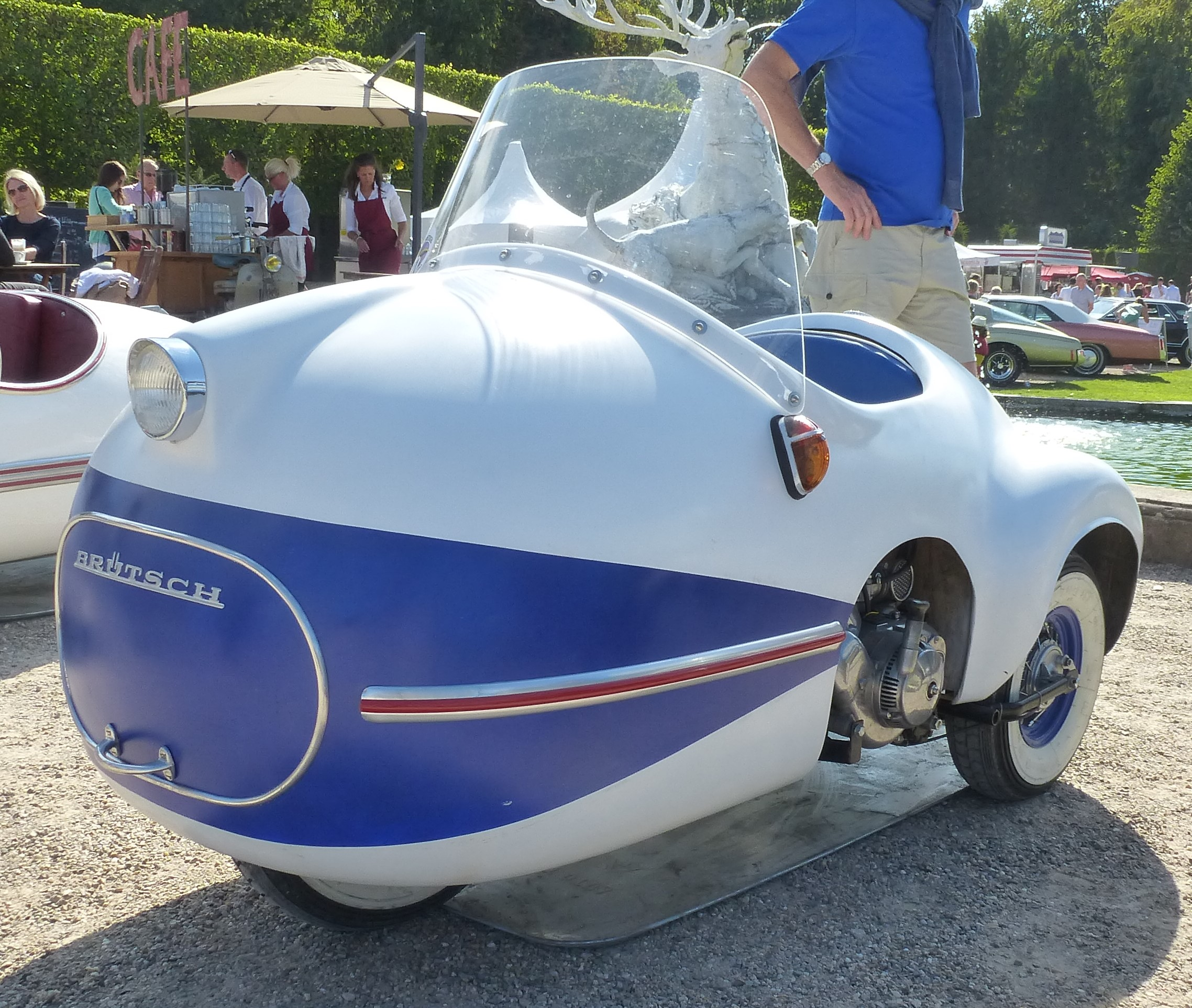
Brütsch Mopetta (1957)

A single seat, 3-wheeled roadster, powered by a single cylinder 49 cc [ILO] engine driving through a three speed gearbox. Top speed was around 45 km/h (28 mph) and fourteen cars were produced. Production was licensed to former Opel dealer Georg von Opel, who planned to build the Mopetta at a former Horex motorcycle factory, however this plan appears to have resulted in nothing more than the production of sales literature. Due to its unusual design and rarity, the Mopetta has been subject to many replicas.

== Brütsch Rollera 1956-1958 ==
A single seat, 3-wheeled roadster, powered by a single cylinder 98 cc Fichtel & Sachs engine driving through a three speed gearbox. Top speed was around 87 km/h (54 mph) and eight cars were produced. Also built under licence by Air Tourist Sàrl of France.

== Brütsch Bussard 1956-1958 ==
A 2-seater, 3-wheeled roadster, powered by a single cylinder 191 cc Fichtel & Sachs engine driving through a four speed gearbox. Top speed was around 105 km/h (65 mph) and eleven cars were produced. One of the last known Bussards was recently written off after rotting away in England. Its windscreen, which remained, was donated to the owner of a Brütsch Pfeil (below), which had no original windscreen.

== Brütsch Pfeil 1956-1958 ==
A 2-seater, 4-wheeled roadster, powered by a twin cylinder 386 cc Lloyd engine driving through a three speed gearbox. Top speed was around 115 km/h (71 mph) and six cars were produced, only one of which survives and is undergoing restoration in England.

== Brütsch V2 1956-1958 ==
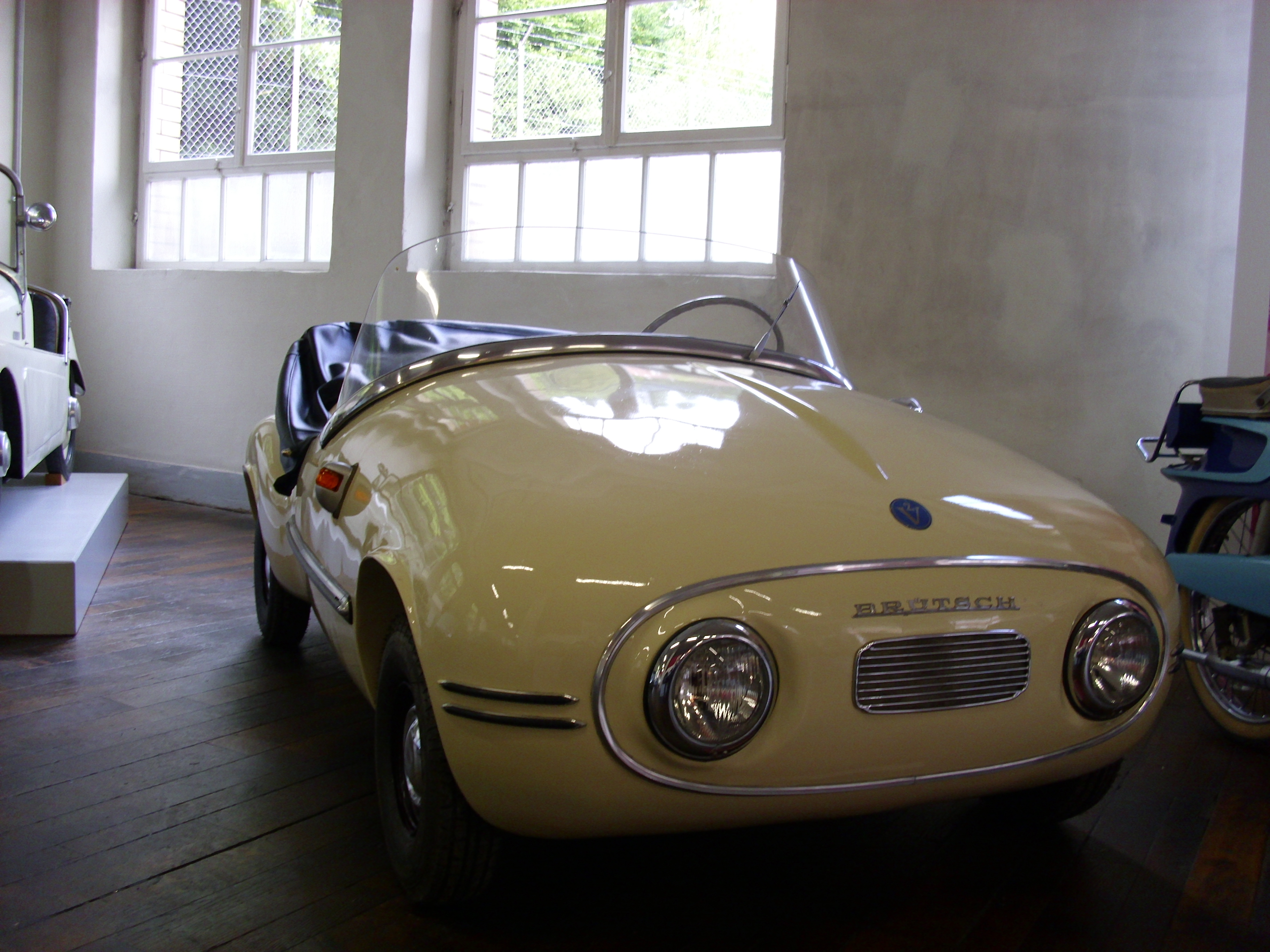
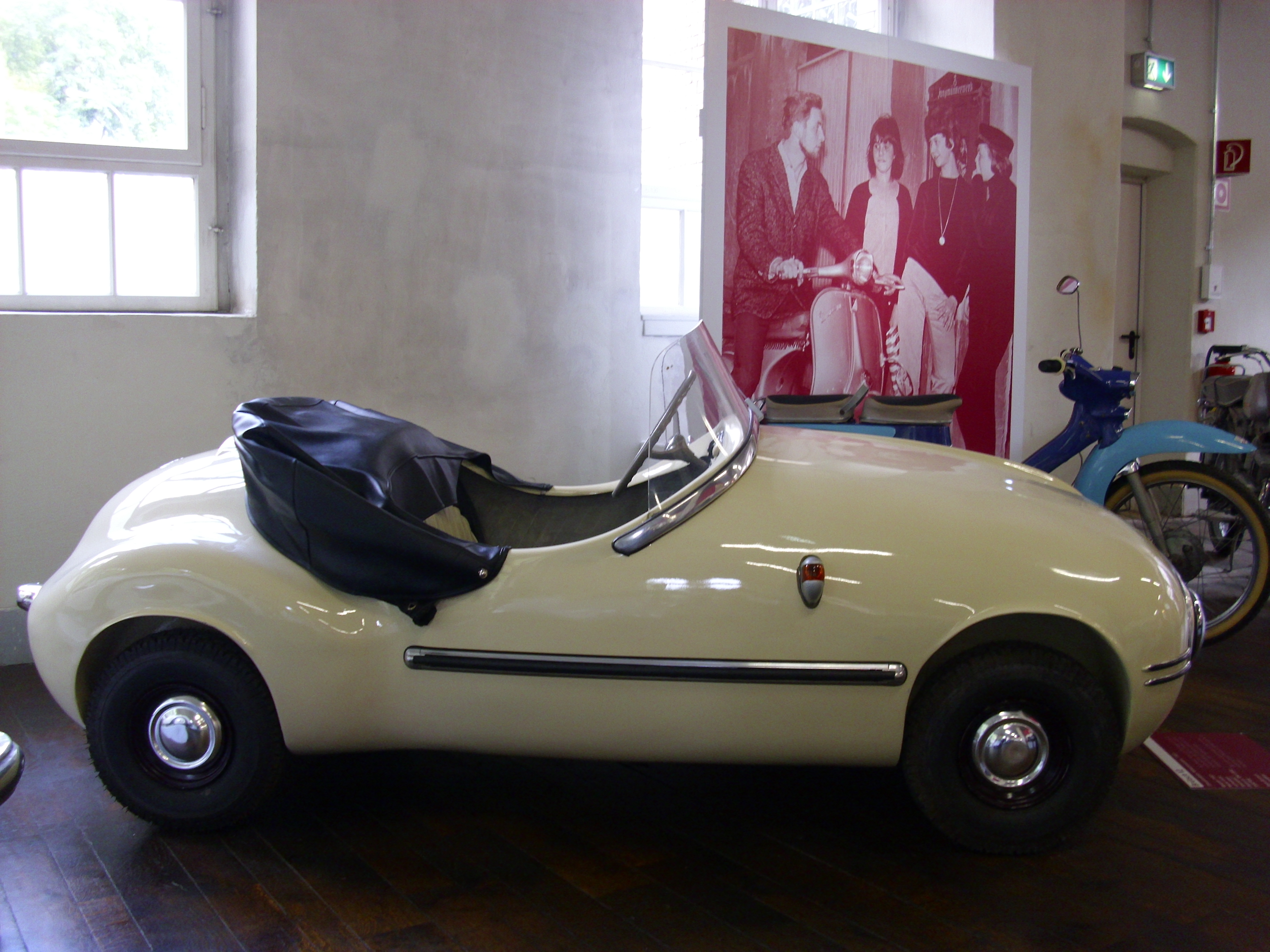
1957 Brütsch V2.

A 2-seater, 4-wheeled roadster. Powered by either a single cylinder 98 cc Fichtel & Sachs engine giving a top speed around 65 km/h (40 mph) or a single cylinder 247 cc Maico engine giving a top speed around 99 km/h (62 mph). Both versions had a four speed gearbox and in total twelve cars were produced.

== Brütsch V2-N 1958 ==
A 2-seater, 4-wheeled roadster with doors. Powered by a twin cylinder 479 cc Fiat 500 engine driving through a four speed gearbox. Top speed was around 135 km/h (84 mph) and three cars were produced. This model was developed for potential Indonesian licensee NGO, but the project eventually came to nothing.
