= USS Acoma (SP-1228) =

Patrol vessel of the United States Navy

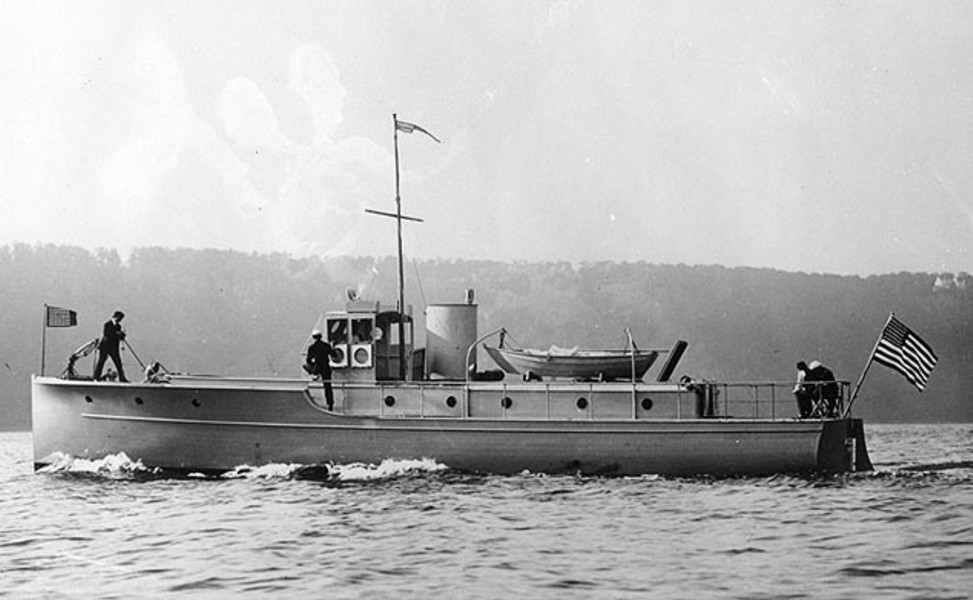
- Acoma 1917 under way, before her Navy service.

History

United States
- Name: USS Acoma
- Namesake: Acoma Pueblo
- Owner: Theodore D. Partridge
- Builder: Gas Engine & Power Co. and Charles L. Seabury Co., Morris Heights, New York
- Yard number: 2571
- Launched: 1917
- Completed: 1917
- Acquired: leased by the Navy 25 September 1917
- Commissioned: 18 October 1917
- Decommissioned: circa 25 November 1918
- Stricken: circa 25 November 1918
- Home port: Newport, Rhode Island; New Bedford, Massachusetts
- Fate: Returned to her owner on 25 November 1918.

General characteristics
- Type: steamboat
- Displacement: 13.45 tons
- Length: 60 ft (18 m)
- Beam: 11 ft 8 in (3.56 m)
- Draft: 2 ft 11 in (0.89 m)
- Propulsion: Steam engine
- Speed: 25 knots (46 km/h)
- Armament: One 1-pounder gun; One AA machine gun

The first USS Acoma (SP-1228) was a relatively fast steamboat for the time — capable of 25 knots (46 km/h) – that was leased from its owner by the United States Navy during World War I. She was outfitted as an armed section patrol craft and assigned to patrol the waterways of Newport, Rhode Island, and New Bedford, Massachusetts. She was returned to her owner at war's end.

== Built in New York ==
Acoma (SP-1228), a section patrol motor boat, was built in 1917 by the Gas Engine & Power Co. and Charles L. Seabury Co., Morris Heights, New York; acquired by the Navy on a free lease from Theodore D. Partridge of New York City on 25 September 1917; and commissioned on 18 October 1917.

== World War I service ==
Acoma was assigned to the 2d Naval District throughout her naval career. After patrolling in the vicinity of Newport, Rhode Island, she was transferred in November 1917 to the area of New Bedford, Massachusetts. The boat served there through the end of World War I.

== Decommissioning ==
Following the Armistice of 11 November 1918, Acoma was returned to her owner on 25 November 1918.
