= Acoma, Nevada =

- Ghost town
- Location within Nevada Location within the United States
- Coordinates: 37°32′54″N 114°10′21″W
- Country: United States
- State: Nevada
- County: Lincoln
- Elevation: 5,528 ft (1,685 m)

Acoma is an extinct town in Lincoln County, in the U.S. state of Nevada.

A variant name is Acoma Station.

The name was probably transferred from the older settlement in New Mexico. The name probably means people of the white rock in the Keres language.

== History ==
In spring, 1904, the Utah and Eastern Copper Company started mining in the area.

The first settlement at Acoma was made about 1905. A post office was in operation at Acoma from 1905 until 1913.

In 1941, the Acoma had a population of 15.
