= Saint-Ferréol, Haute-Savoie =

Saint-Ferréol
- Commune
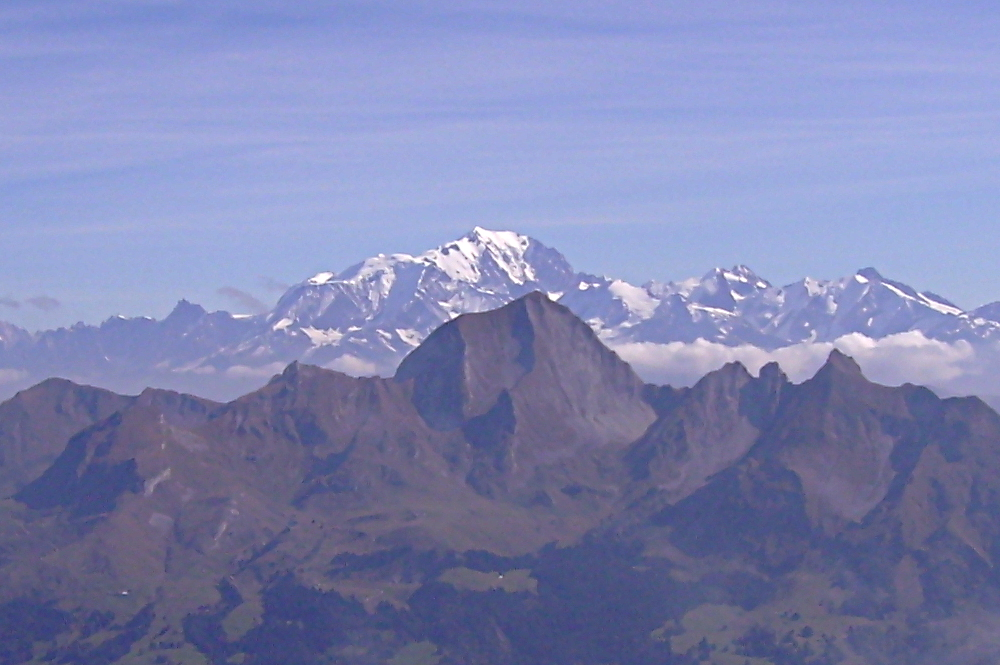
- Mont Charvin, with Mont Blanc beyond, seen from Saint-Ferréol

- Coat of arms
- Location of Saint-Ferréol
- Location within France Location within Auvergne-Rhône-Alpes
- Coordinates: 45°46′00″N 6°18′27″E
- Country: France
- Region: Auvergne-Rhône-Alpes
- Department: Haute-Savoie
- Arrondissement: Annecy
- Canton: Faverges
- Intercommunality: C.C. des Sources du Lac d'Annecy

Government
  - Mayor (2020–2026): Philippe Prud'Homme
- Area^{1}: 16.79 km^{2} (6.48 sq mi)
- Highest elevation: 2,038 m (6,686 ft)
- Lowest elevation: 479 m (1,572 ft)
- Population (2023): 874
  - Density: 52.1/km^{2} (135/sq mi)
- Demonym: Ferréolains
- Time zone: UTC+01:00 (CET)
  - Summer (DST): UTC+02:00 (CEST)
- INSEE/Postal code: 74234 /74210
- ^{1} French Land Register data, which excludes lakes, ponds, glaciers > 1 km^{2} (0.386 sq mi or 247 acres) and river estuaries.

Saint-Ferréol is a commune in the Haute-Savoie department in the Auvergne-Rhône-Alpes region in south-eastern France.

== See also ==
- Communes of the Haute-Savoie department
