= Corbas =

- Commune
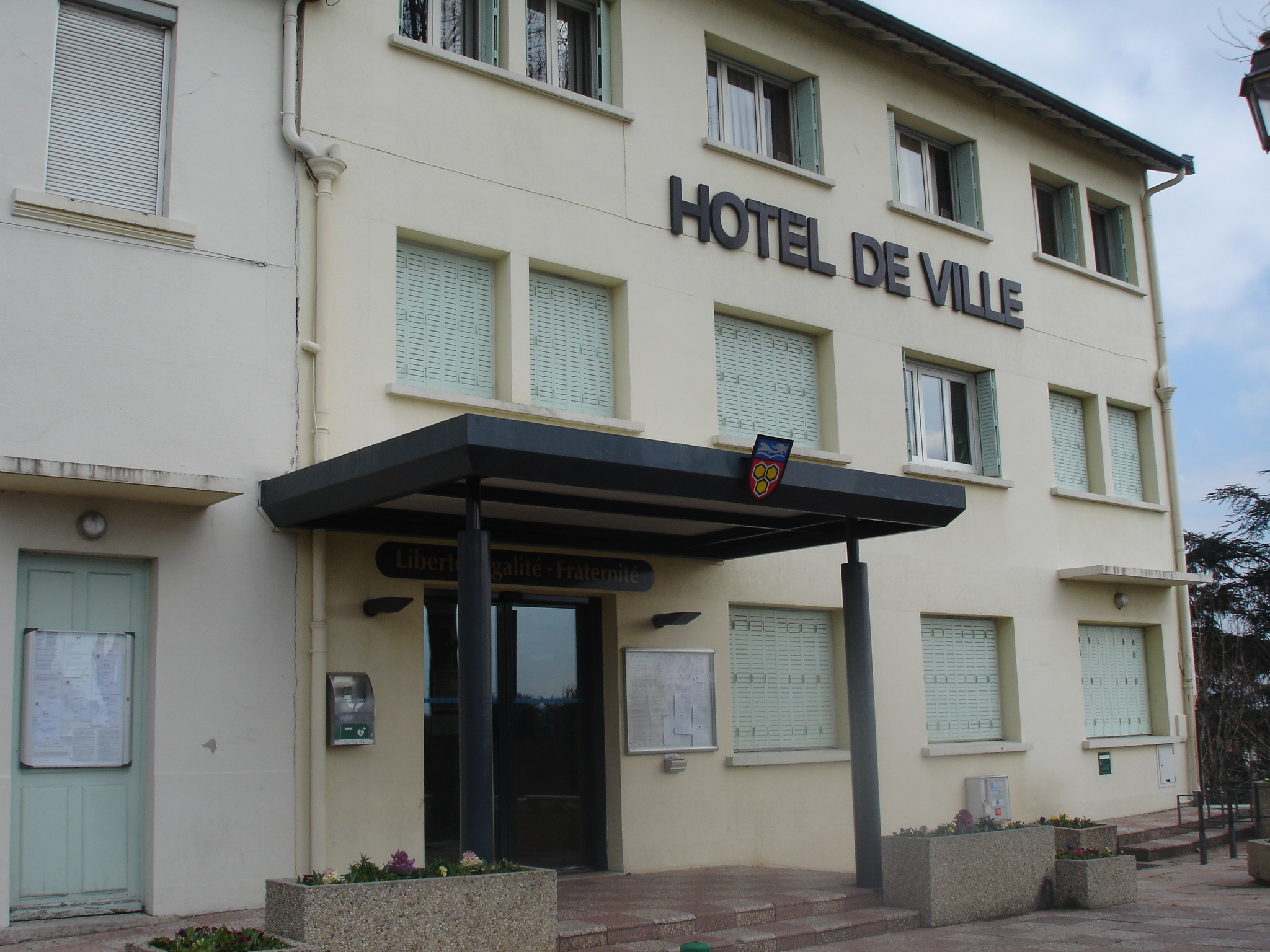
- The town hall of Corbas

- Coat of arms
- Location of Corbas
- Location within France Location within Auvergne-Rhône-Alpes
- Coordinates: 45°40′N 4°54′E
- Country: France
- Region: Auvergne-Rhône-Alpes
- Metropolis: Lyon Metropolis
- Arrondissement: Lyon

Government
  - Mayor (2020–2026): Alain Viollet
- Area^{1}: 11.88 km^{2} (4.59 sq mi)
- Elevation: 210 m (690 ft)
- Highest elevation: 228 m (748 ft)
- Lowest elevation: 188 m (617 ft)
- Population (2023): 11,315
  - Density: 952.4/km^{2} (2,467/sq mi)
- Time zone: UTC+01:00 (CET)
  - Summer (DST): UTC+02:00 (CEST)
- INSEE/Postal code: 69273 /69960
- ^{1} French Land Register data, which excludes lakes, ponds, glaciers > 1 km^{2} (0.386 sq mi or 247 acres) and river estuaries.

Corbas (French pronunciation: [kɔʁba]; Arpitan: Corbê) is a commune in the Metropolis of Lyon in Rhône-Alpes region in eastern France.

== Demographics ==
Historical population

| Year | Pop. | ±% p.a. |
|---|---|---|
| 1861 | 354 | — |
| 1866 | 377 | +1.27% |
| 1872 | 374 | −0.13% |
| 1876 | 396 | +1.44% |
| 1881 | 427 | +1.52% |
| 1886 | 412 | −0.71% |
| 1891 | 408 | −0.19% |
| 1896 | 387 | −1.05% |
| 1901 | 414 | +1.36% |
| 1906 | 457 | +2.00% |
| 1911 | 437 | −0.89% |
| 1921 | 422 | −0.35% |
| 1926 | 515 | +4.06% |
| 1931 | 585 | +2.58% |

| Year | Pop. | ±% p.a. |
|---|---|---|
| 1936 | 630 | +1.49% |
| 1946 | 607 | −0.37% |
| 1954 | 734 | +2.40% |
| 1962 | 1,362 | +8.03% |
| 1968 | 2,208 | +8.39% |
| 1975 | 3,225 | +5.56% |
| 1982 | 6,375 | +10.22% |
| 1990 | 8,101 | +3.04% |
| 1999 | 9,259 | +1.50% |
| 2007 | 9,450 | +0.26% |
| 2012 | 11,023 | +3.13% |
| 2017 | 11,050 | +0.05% |
| 2023 | 11,315 | +0.40% |

From 1962, population without double counting - Sources : Cassini and Insee

== Twin towns ==
Corbas is twinned with:

- Corbetta, Lombardy, Italy
