= ZF Sachs =

German family business

Fichtel & Sachs
- Company type: Private
- Industry: Automotive
- Founded: August 1895; 130 years ago; Schweinfurt, Germany; (as Schweinfurt Precision Ball Bearing factories)
- Founder: Ernst Sachs; Karl Fichtel
- Defunct: 2011
- Successor: Mannesmann; ZF Friedrichshafen
- Headquarters: Schweinfurt, Germany
- Area served: Worldwide
- Products: Motors; Bicycles; Ball bearings; Automotive parts
- Revenue: ▲ Euro 1.832 billion (2009)
- Number of employees: 16,488 (2009)
- Website: aftermarket.zf.com/go/en/sachs/home

ZF Sachs AG, also known as Fichtel & Sachs, was founded in Schweinfurt in 1895 and was a well-known German family business. At its last point as an independent company, the company name was Fichtel & Sachs AG.

In 1997, the automotive supplier was taken over by Mannesmann and renamed Mannesmann Sachs AG. As of 2001, Sachs belonged to ZF Friedrichshafen as a subsidiary company ZF Sachs AG. In 2011, ZF Sachs, like other Group subsidiaries, was legally merged with ZF Friedrichshafen AG and the independent business units integrated into the ZF divisions. Sachs has since become a brand of ZF Friedrichshafen AG. The head office for development, production and sales of products of the brand Sachs remained in Schweinfurt. The Schweinfurt plant is today (2017) the largest location of the automotive supplier ZF Friedrichshafen.

Today, Fichtel & Sachs is a German manufacturer of automotive parts, producing powertrain and suspension components. In the past the company also having produced ball bearings, motorcycle engines, bicycle parts and – via its subsidiary Sachs Motorcycles – motorcycles, mopeds, motorised bicycles and all-terrain vehicles (ATVs).

== History ==
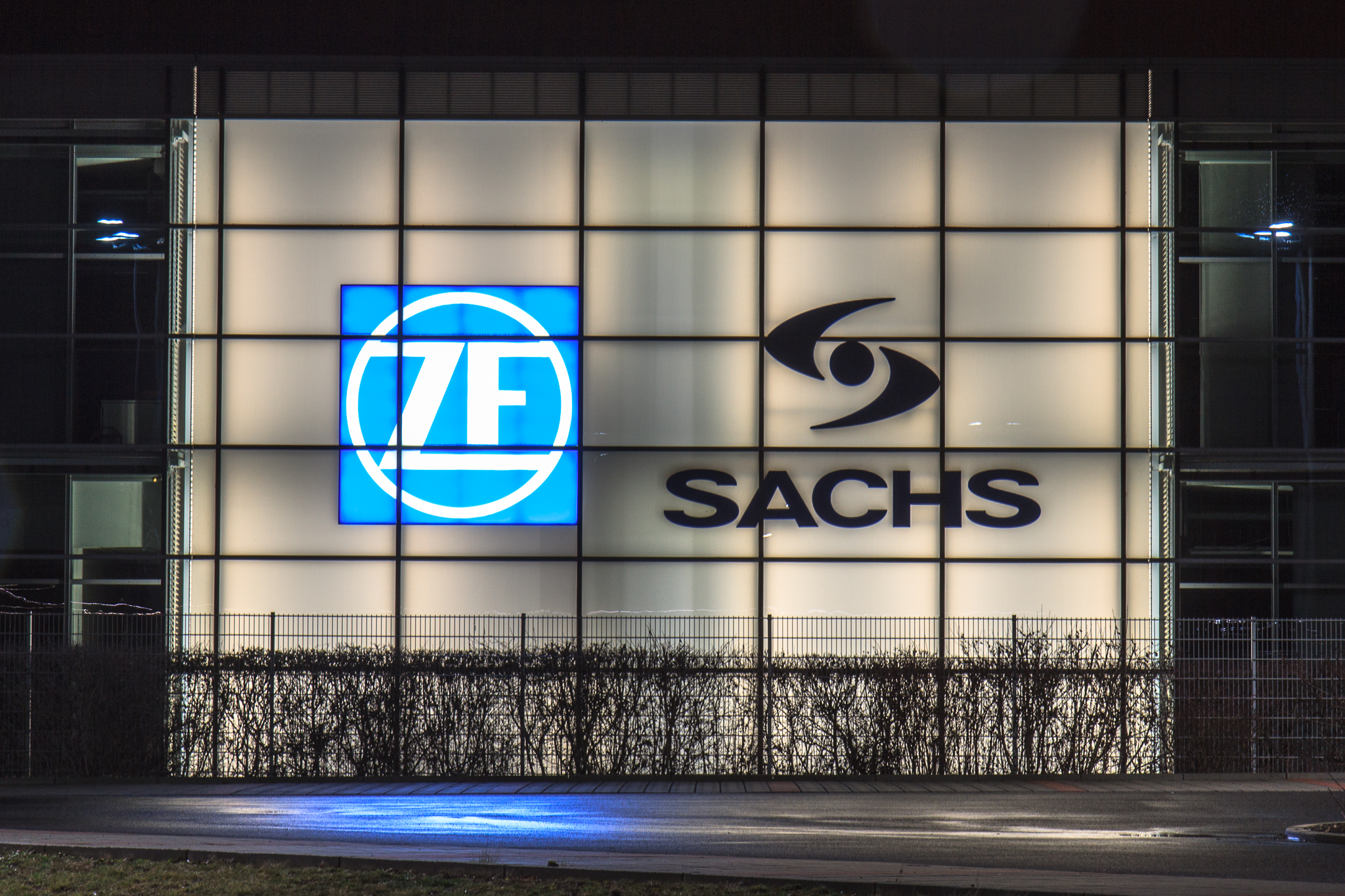
Logo at the production site in Schweinfurt

=== Ernst Sachs era ===
==== Early beginnings ====
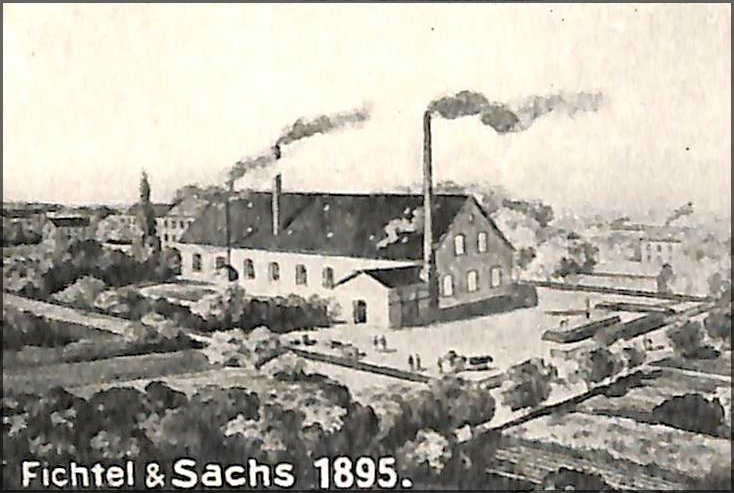
Logo at the production site in Schweinfurt

In 1894, Ernst Sachs made his first design attempts for bicycle hubs, with the first patent on November 23 on bicycle ball bearings with sliding ball tread. On 1 August 1895 Ernst Sachs (technical director) and Karl Fichtel (commercial management) founded Schweinfurt Precision Ball Bearing factories (Fichtel & Sachs as oHG) with a founding capital sum of 15,000 Deutsche marks. First ball bearings and bicycle hubs were made. In 1896, Schweinfurt Precision Ball Bearing factories already employed 70 workers, who produced about 50 to 70 hubs daily.

==== World-famous inventions ====
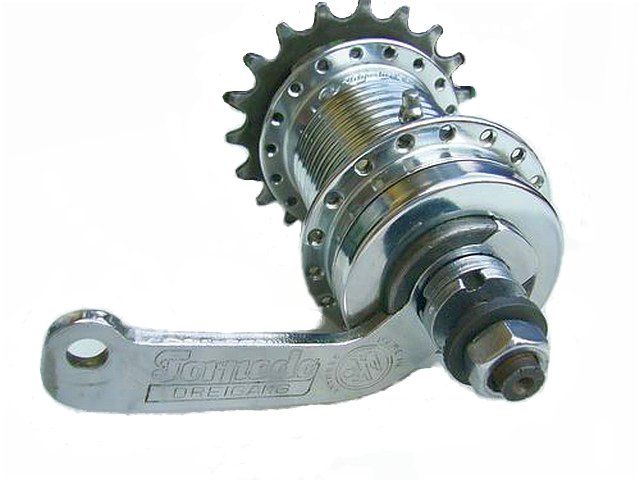

- 1889: Bicycle freewheel by Ernst Sachs.
- 1903: Backpedal brake by Ernst Sachs.
- 1903: Torpedo freewheel hub: bicycle component with integrated freewheel and coaster brake, by Ernst Sachs.

The bicycle gear was not invented by Fichtel & Sachs, but developed over decades. This developed the conventional, modern bike, with its basic components from Fichtel & Sachs.

===== Birth of globalisation =====
After the invention of the torpedo freewheel hub in 1903, Ernst Sachs was the first to have the idea to not patent the whole product, but worldwide to patent only one component, without which no one could build a modern bike. This led to product piracy in China at the time, with confoundingly similar falsifications of the torpedo freewheel hub. After the invention of the well-known torpedo freewheel hub, which preceded eight years of construction work and was already so mature that it has barely changed over many decades, the company grew rapidly. By 1905, they were employing 1,800 employees and had a production of 382,000 torpedo hubs.

==== Rapid growth ====
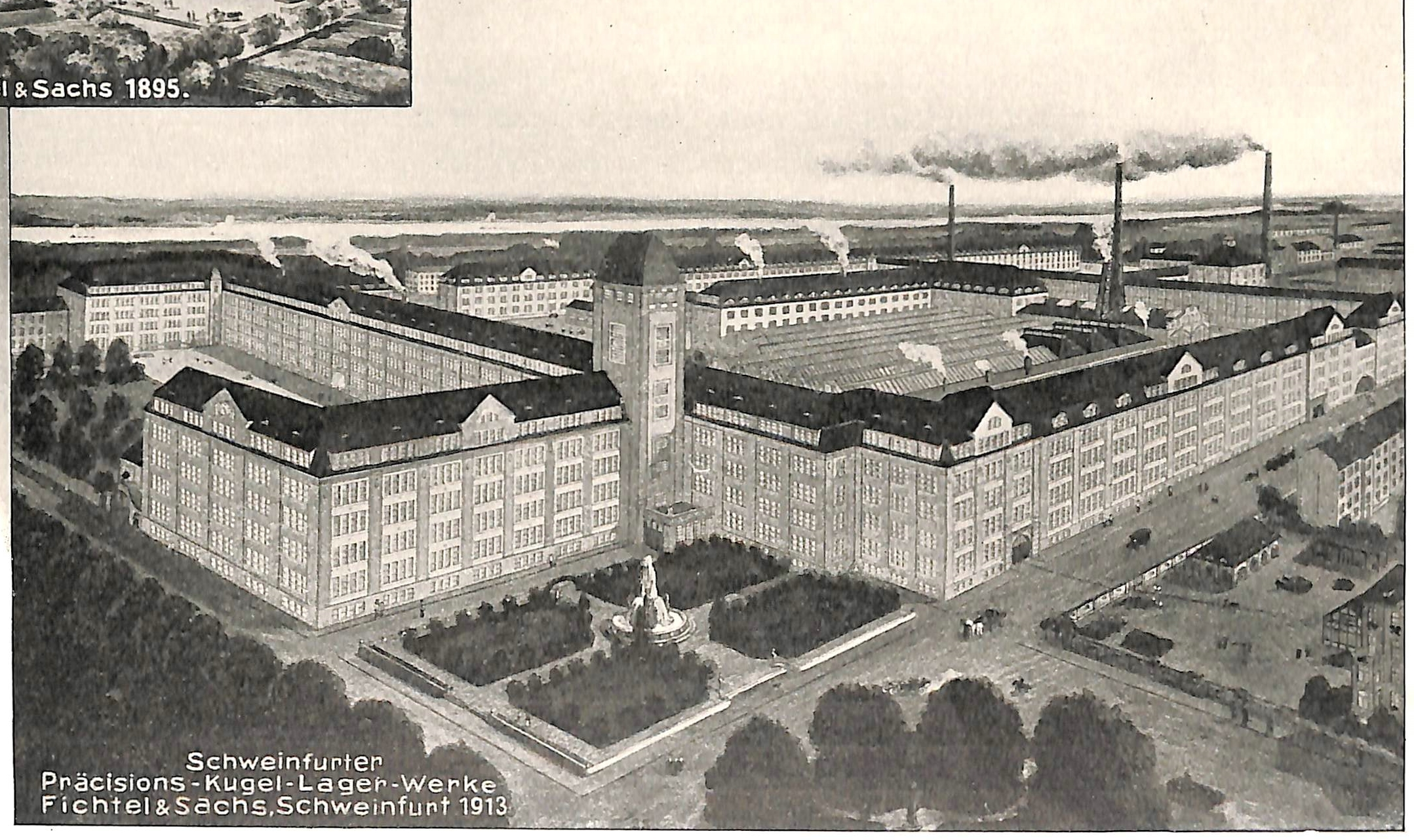

Sachs's father-in-law, Wilhelm Höpflinger, received a patent for the first usable ball cage still used today in the ball bearing industry. Fichtel & Sachs was one of the world's leading companies for rolling bearings, where Sachs registered more than 100 patents, and bicycle hubs before the First World War. A further development boost brought the conversion of multiple of the factories to armaments during the war, when the number of employees rose from 5000 to 8000.

In 1911, Karl Fichtel died and in 1912, in order to counter the high customs duties to nearby Austria-Hungary, Sachs acquired a factory in Černýš (Tschirnitz) on the river Ohře (Eger) in Bohemia, today part of Perštejn. Somewhat later, a subsidiary factory was built in the United States. During the four years of the war, the number of Fichtel & Sachs employees increased from 3,000 to around 8,000. In addition to hubs and ball bearings of all kinds, armour products were manufactured in Schweinfurt. Today's main plant (North Plant), between Hauptbahnhof and Ernst-Sachs-Straße, is based on a weapons and projectile factory, which Fichtel & Sachs built here first, in what is now the eastern plant area.

In 1919, the first works council was elected at Fichtel and Sachs, one year before the Works Councils Act (Betriebsrätegesetz) was implemented nationwide.

In the inflation year 1923, the transformation into a public company took place. A holding company of the company, the Sachs GmbH, was founded in the same year in Munich. At the turn of the year 1927/1928, the number of employees rose to a provisional high of 9,026. The hub production accounted for 67% of the total production, the remainder fell on rolling bearings. Sachs founded a company pension, the Ernst-Sachs-Hilfe.

==== Interwar period ====
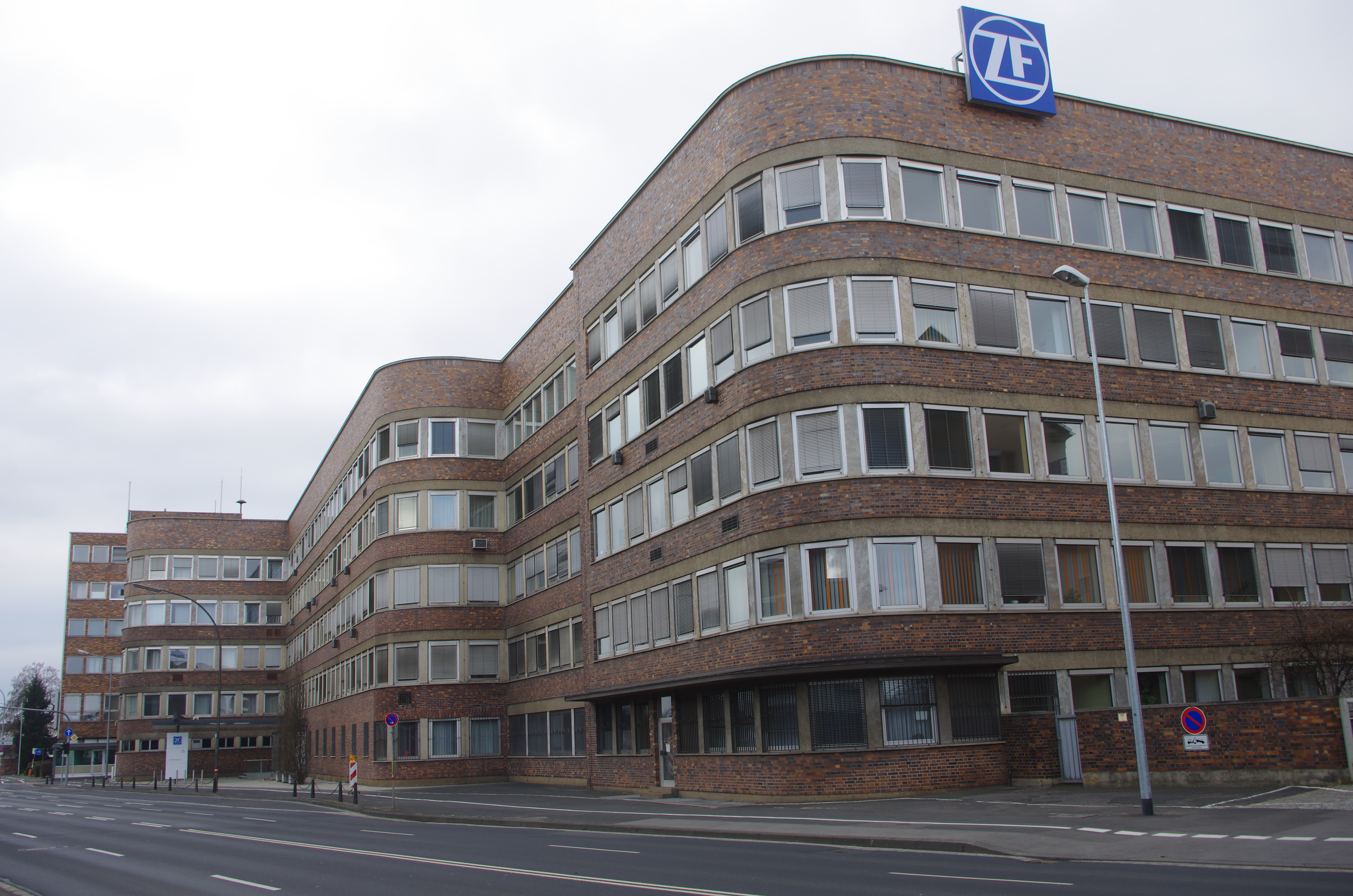

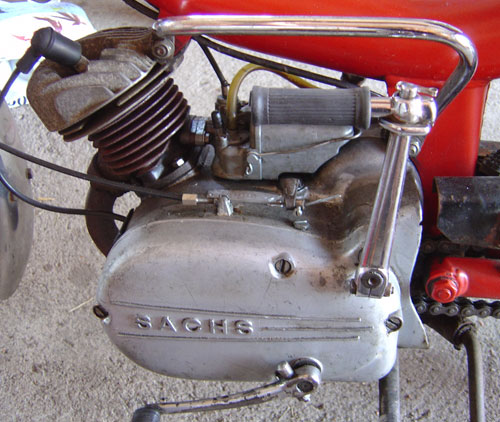

In 1929, on the eve of the great recession of 1929/30, Ernst Sachs sold the rolling bearing division with 3000 coworkers, which made about half of the enterprise, to the Swedish conglomerate SKF. This merged with the Schweinfurt Fries & Höpflinger AG, the Maschinenfabrik Rheinland from Krefeld, the Riebe-Werke and the rolling bearing production of the German weapons and munitions factories DWM, both in Berlin, to the United Ball Bearings AG (VKF, from 1953 SKF GmbH). With the proceeds Sachs paid off the Fichtel heirs and invested in sustainable developments, such as clutches, small engines and shock absorbers.

=== Willy Sachs era ===
==== National Socialism ====
In 1932, Ernst Sachs died, and his only son Willy Sachs took over the company. In 1937 he presented at the Saxonette auto show a 60 cc engine that could be installed in the rear hub of bicycles.

At the beginning of the Second World War, the number of employees was again at 7,000. During the war, there was no significant change in the product range. Almost every German tank was equipped with Sachs clutches. Among the over 7,000 workers in 1944, many were forced laborers.

At the end of the war, 67% of the production facilities were destroyed.

==== Early post-war period ====
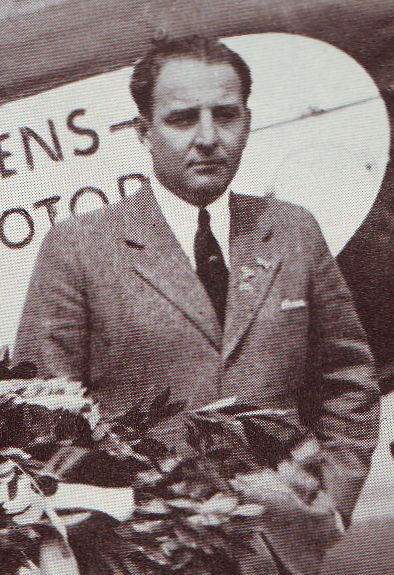

In 1956, the company presented a semi-automatic transmission called Saxomat. From the end of the Second World War to the mid-1980s, Fichtel & Sachs also produced single-cylinder two-stroke gasoline engines with capacities of 50 to 400 cubic centimeters, which were called StaMo. From 1953, a single-cylinder two-stroke diesel engine was built under license from Holder, which was initially used with 500, later with 400 and 600 cubic centimeters, especially in tugs and small tractors.

=== Successor ===
Consul Willy Sachs died in 1958. His son Ernst Wilhelm Sachs was appointed a full member of the executive board. In 1960, the first air-cooled Wankel engine in the world (for stationary operations) was developed. From then until the mid-1970s, small single-disc rotary engines were produced. At the Schweinfurt location alone, more than 10,000 employees were counted. In 1967, Ernst Wilhelm Sachs left the company's executive board and, together with his brother Gunter Sachs, becomes deputy chairman of the supervisory board. On the world market, Fichtel & Sachs was able to maintain a leading and sometimes dominant position in the market with its four main products - small engines, bicycle hubs, clutches and shock absorbers - until the 1980s.

In the 1960s and 1980s, Fichtel & Sachs took over various other traditional brands and manufacturers of bicycles and bicycle components, including Hercules, Rabeneick, Huret, Maillard and Sedis.

In 1969, the foundation stone was laid in Schweinfurt for a second plant, the Süd plant in the new industrial area of Hafen-West, which doubles the size of the plant premises. In 1971, the Sachs racing service was built, with rally registration and support. In 1973, the wide hub program is complemented by the automatic switching two-speed Torpedo-Automatic. Ernst Wilhelm Sachs died in a 1977 heliskiing accident in Val d'Isere.

In 1981, the Foundation of Fichtel & Sachs (West Africa) Ltd. in Lagos, Nigeria, together with Salzgitter AG was founded. In 1986, Fichtel & Sachs started to develop prototypes for micro combined heat and power plants and started 10-year field trials.

=== Mannesmann & Bosch / Siemens era ===
After the sale of the majority shareholding to the British GKN group in 1977 had been prohibited by the consumer financial conduct authorities, as well as the death of Ernst Wilhelm Sachs, the sale of the company was excluded due to a clause of his will for the next 10 years. In 1987, Gunter Sachs and his brother's daughters sold the company to Mannesmann. In 1991, the takeover was completed by Mannesmann and the majority entry of Mannesmann in the Boge AG with the former head office in Eitorf, which was also completely taken over two years later.

In 1997, engine construction was discontinued or sold and the production of bicycle hub gears and other components sold to SRAM. Sachs Bikes took over part of the two-wheeler activities. Furthermore, this year Fichtel & Sachs was renamed Mannesmann Sachs. As part of the Mannesmann takeover by Vodafone, the company went in 2000 as part of the previously founded Mannesmann Atecs to a consortium of companies around Bosch and Siemens.

=== ZF Friedrichshafen Era ===
In 2001, Fichtel & Sachs was sold to ZF Friedrichshafen and renamed ZF Sachs in the same year. The traditional French chain manufacturer Sedis has been resold to the Indian bicycle and industrial holding 'Tube Investments'.

As early as November 2002, a large development center was opened in the Werk-Süd.

On 1 August 2011 the company merged with ZF Friedrichshafen. As a result, ZF Sachs as an independent company, the business operations and the brand Sachs led ZF Friedrichshafen.

The Schweinfurt south plant has been continuously expanded since the takeover by ZF until today, also with a plastic center and a development center for e-mobility. In 2017, the Schweinfurt location with 9,500 employees almost reached its peak employee number from the post-war period.

== Products ==
=== Today's product range ===
Today's product range coming from the Schweinfurt plants of ZF Friedrichshafen AG includes drive components such as clutch systems, torque converters, dual-mass flywheels, electric drives and complete modules for hybrid vehicles, as well as suspension components such as shock absorbers and damping systems for cars, trucks, motorcycles and rail vehicles.

Examples products:

- Nivomat (a portmanteau of the French niveau and automatique) is the name for a vehicle suspension level-control technology previously created by Mannesmann-Sachs (now ZF Sachs). Compared to the common use of springs, struts, and shock absorbers in a car suspension, Nivomat replaces all of these components with a single unit per wheel which provides damping, ride control, and a self-levelling function. The Nivomat system uniquely incorporates an internal pump which relies on relative movement between the axle and the chassis to provide the levelling and damping function.

=== Sachs-Motors ===
Fichtel & Sachs began producing a vehicle engine with a displacement of 74 cubic centimeters in 1930. As early as 1932, followed by a model with 98 cubic centimeters. In the 1930s, the bike with auxiliary motor "Saxonette", stationary and boat engines and motorcycle engines were included in the program. After the war, the old engine range was supplemented by a large number of new designs with 50 cubic centimeter displacement for mopeds, mopeds, small and light motorcycles. Engines with larger displacement were used in small and snowmobiles and motorcycles.

The stationary engine area was expanded by two-stroke diesel engines and mower engines with different capacities. Of particular note is the development of a range of Wankel engines in various sizes for a wide variety of applications. After the assumption of the enterprise by Mannesmann the engine production was stopped 1997.

=== Bicycle components ===
Fichtel & Sachs produced its own bicycle component groups until the takeover of the bicycle division by SRAM in the mid-1990s. For brake production Sachs cooperated with Modolo and in the production of derailleurs with Weinmann and Simplex.

== Renak in Reichenbach ==
In 1944, the production of the torpedo freewheel hub was outsourced from Schweinfurt to Reichenbach in the Vogtland. At the end of the war, production was interrupted. In August 1945, the operation was taken over by the state government of Saxony and handed over to the USSR on 1 November 1946, trading as part as Awtowelo. On 1 May 1952 it became the VEB vehicle parts factory Fichtel & Sachs, Reichenbach the GDR. In 1956, the Renak brand was protected for the VEB Renak works (Reichenbacher hubs and coupling plants). The mid-1960s, the production of bicycle parts reached a peak with exports to 40 countries, but it was throttled and stopped the export.

On 1 July 1990 the transformation to RENAK-Werke GmbH took place. Products such as steering bearings, bottom bracket, idler sprockets and unbraked steel hubs have been discontinued. Fichtel & Sachs AG took over the production of the jet hub. Under the administration of the Treuhandanstalt, the company was privatized in several sections.

The bicycle components business unit, which only produced the coaster brake hub Univers (torpedo) and Speed (Jet) and aluminum hubs, was sold to the Flying Pigeon Bicycle Group Corporation (Tianjin) from China on 1 April 1994, and the RENAK International GmbH with approx 30 employees.

On 7 March 1994 the Reichenbacher hub and bicycle components GmbH was founded and the production of the hub dynamo Enparlite (mechanically switched off, with gearbox) prepared. End of 1994, the sale of the Univers and speed hub production including the trademark RENAK Flying Pigeon back to the Reichenbacher Hubs and Fahrrad-Komponenten GmbH, which then shortened its name to RENAK Komponenten GmbH.

== Re-introduction ==
The Sachs brand was revived in 2018, and is now a major producer of bikes.

== Literature ==
- Wilfried Rott: Sachs – Unternehmer, Playboys, Millionäre. Eine Geschichte von Vätern und Söhnen. Blessing, München 2005, ISBN 3-89667-270-3
- Thomas Horling: Kartell und ausländisches Kapital. Die deutsche Wälzlagerindustrie in den Jahren 1925–1932. In: Jahrbuch für fränkische Landesforschung, 66, 2006, S. 521–562
- Andreas Dornheim: Sachs – Mobilität und Motorisierung – Eine Unternehmensgeschichte. Hoffmann und Campe, Hamburg 2015, ISBN 978-3-455-50382-1
- Volker Ullrich: Goldene Jahre im braunen Reich. In: Die Zeit, Nr. 42/2005

== See also ==
- Sachs Motorcycles
- Rotax
- Gunter Sachs
