= Sachs Motorcycles =

German motorcycle manufacturer

Sach Bikes International Company Limited
- Formerly: Nuremberg Hercules-Werke; SACHS Fahrzeug-und Motorentechnik GmbH
- Industry: Automotive
- Founded: April 5, 1886; 140 years ago
- Founder: Carl Marschütz
- Headquarters: Germany
- Products: Motorcycles
- Website: www.sfm-bikes.de

Sachs Bikes International Company Limited (SFM GmbH) is a German-based motorcycle manufacturer, founded in 1886 in Schweinfurt as Schweinfurter Präzisions-Kugellagerwerke Fichtel & Sachs, formerly known as Fichtel & Sachs, Mannesmann Sachs and later just Sachs.

The company manufactured their first motorcycle in 1904, making it one of the world's oldest motorcycle manufacturers. Peugeot, the oldest extant, began manufacture in 1898. Indian Motorcycle began producing bikes in 1901.Triumph produced bikes in 1902 and Harley-Davidson and Husqvarna both in 1903. The company produced ball bearings, motorcycle engines and bicycle parts. Sachs Motorcycles was a subsidiary producing motorcycles, mopeds, motorised bicycles and all-terrain vehicles (ATVs). The manufacturing of motorcycles was broken out of Sachs into its own company and the parent company producing automotive parts was bought by ZF Friedrichshafen AG to form ZF Sachs.

Current SFM GmbH is sole successor of Sachs Fahrzeug- und Motorentechnik GmbH and Hercules-Werke GmbH.

== History ==
The company was established in Neumarkt by Carl Marschütz on April 5, 1886, as "Nuremberg Hercules-Werke". Initially, it manufactured bicycles and had eight employed, then increasing to 170 eight years later. By 1894 the company produced almost 5,000 bicycles. One year later, facilities were moved from Neumarkt to the Fürther Straße in Nuremberg.

Hercules developed an electronic vehicle in 1898, with a maximum speed of 40 km/h, before manufacturing its first motorcycle in 1905. By then the company also produced light trucks with a capacity of 1,2 tn. In 1930 the company started production of three-wheeled automobiles with 200 cc-engines.

Carl Marschütz and his family members were forced to emigrate from Germany to USA in the early 1930s. The Aryanization of Jewish business meant that his business was effectively taken over, and he re-settled in Los Angeles, eventually dying in 1957. Later on, although his business was stolen from him, he was still entitled to his company pension which allowed him some comfort. Like many escaping the Nazi regime, some of his family members changed to a more western sounding name. For example, his son Fritz Marschütz became Frank Marshall. Carl Marschütz died at the age of 93 is buried next to his wife in Nuremberg, who had died 26 years earlier. Carl Marschütz and Ernst Sachs have streets named after them on the site of the former factory.

"Nuremberg Hercules-Werke" had begun to manufacture motorcycle using proprietary engines from companies like FN, but later were forced to only use German manufactured engines, to the benefit of Sachs.

"Nuremberg Hercules-Werke" was heavily damaged after WW2, allies also took useful equipment from the rubble of "Nuremberg Hercules-Werke" as reparations. The remaining staff used metal and brown paint from manufacturing milk churns to eventually restart bicycle production. Hercules enjoyed 2 stroke moped popularity in next few decades. In the UK, there was also a Birmingham-based bicycle company also called Hercules, so German Hercules mopeds were sold under the brand name "Prior" as reference to the German Hercules company being older. Hercules is most known outside Germany for the 1974 Hercules Wankel engine motorcycle, using a Sachs Rotary engine.

Sachs took over Victoria, Express and DKW in the 1960s, a few years after "Willy" Sachs, Ernst Sachs son, and prominent member of the SS and friend of senior Nazis, committed suicide 1958. Fichtel & Sachs became a large maker of automotive parts. Their moped motors continued to be used by many brands until the mid-90s and small capacity motorcycle engines of up to 175 cc displacement were also made. The company began to supply motorcycles for the German Federal Armed Forces in 1992.

After facing a series of financial problems, stemming from pensions issues relating to the Hercules bicycle works, the company went into insolvency proceedings and ultimately saw a successful management buyout led by the managing director Corrado Savazzi. At this time Sachs was reduced to local assembly of small, cheap, Chinese-sourced scooters, which weren't doing well. The distinctive Sachs MadAss was the only Sachs-engineered motorcycle made at the time.

Hartmut Huhn, Technical Director and later CEO of Sachs led the development of new models in the late 1990s. The Hercules brand name was not available for use as it had already been sold, but the former Hercules factory in Nuremberg became the new headquarters for "SACHS Fahrzeug-und Motorentechnik GmbH" . Notable new models included the Sach MadAss, the Sachs Roadster 125 (using a Yamaha Virago 125 engine), Sachs Roadster 650 (using a Suzuki XF 650 Freewind engine), a Sachs Roadster 800 (using a Suzuki VS800GL intruder engine) and its derivative the Sach B-805, inspired by the Sachs Beast 1000 concept bike. The Sachs Roadster 800 was designed by TargetDesign, previously famous for the Suzuki Katana, with the frame designed by Egli, previously known for the "Egli-Vincent" motorcycle.

Sachs also distributed for the French brand Voxan Motorcycles and manufactured the Münch Mammut 2000 in limited numbers. A concept motorcycle called the Sachs Beast was a 1000cc (supplied by Folan) v-twin was in development for production at the time of insolvency. Ironically, Sachs, traditionally and engine supplier, struggled to secure engines from other companies. For example, use of the Honda VTR1000 was planned for a subsequent model, and the Suzuki TL1000 engine went to Cagiva for the Cagiva Raptor and Navigator models. Sachs even explored and failed to get permission to use the Britten engine molds and tooling from his widow. In 2004 a concept bike called the Sachs Madass 500 was built using a Royal Enfield 500cc parallel twin engine.

Post insolvency the administrator Mr. Wolker Boehm was not only able to continue trading, but also put the company in a position to develop new models, such as the new XTC125, unveiled at the Intermot fair in Cologne, Germany in October 2006. In 2007 the company moved to new locations in Nuremberg (Katzwang) and 2008 changed its name from SACHS Fahrzeug- und Motorentechnik GmbH to SFM GmbH. In 2010 it has become one of the market leaders in self-propelled electric bicycles and development of new motorcycle and scooter models has continued, taking the brand away from local assembly of cheap scooters under the crisis years to possibly rebuilding its own former strong identity.

== Models ==
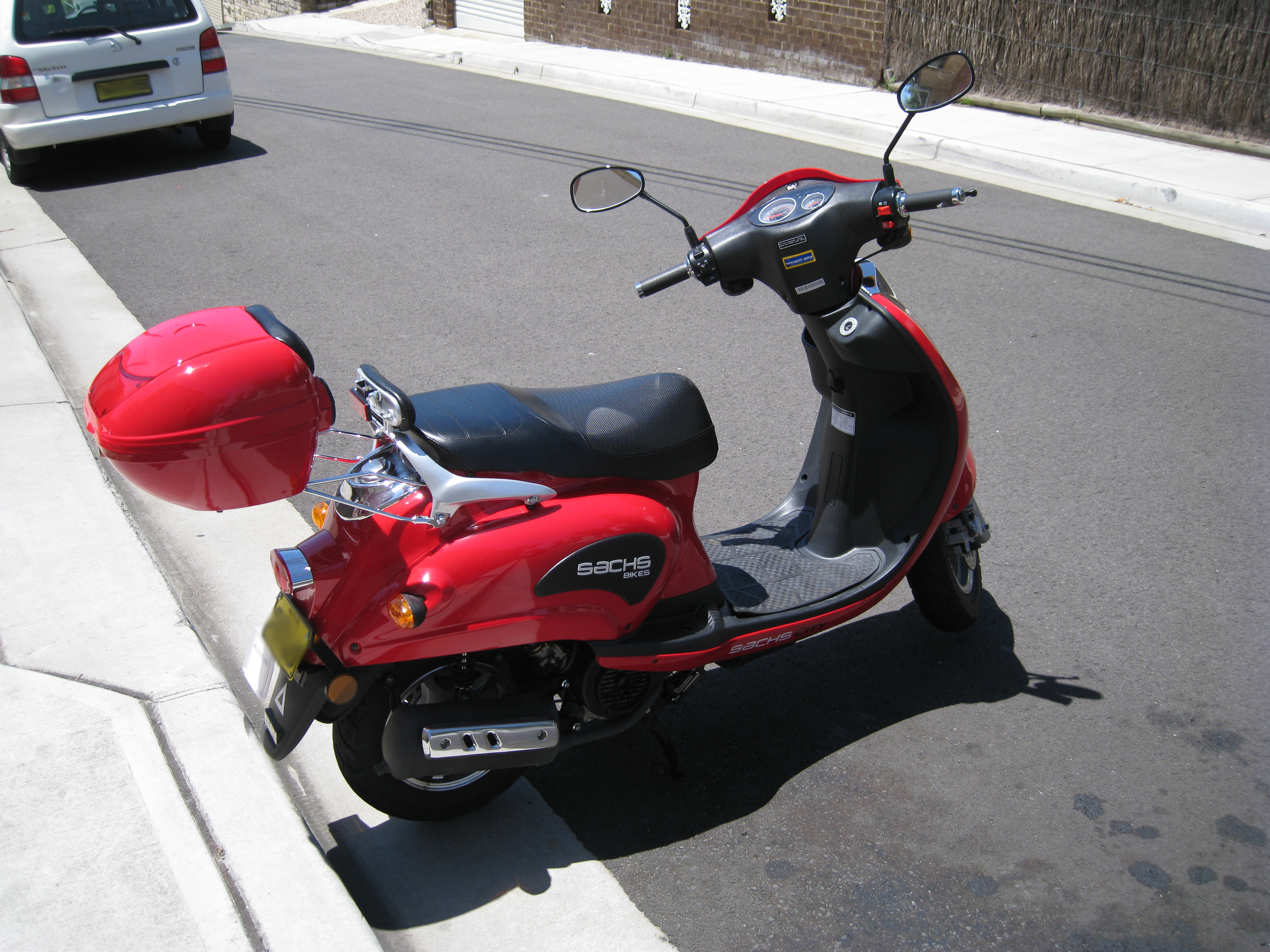
Sachs City scooter

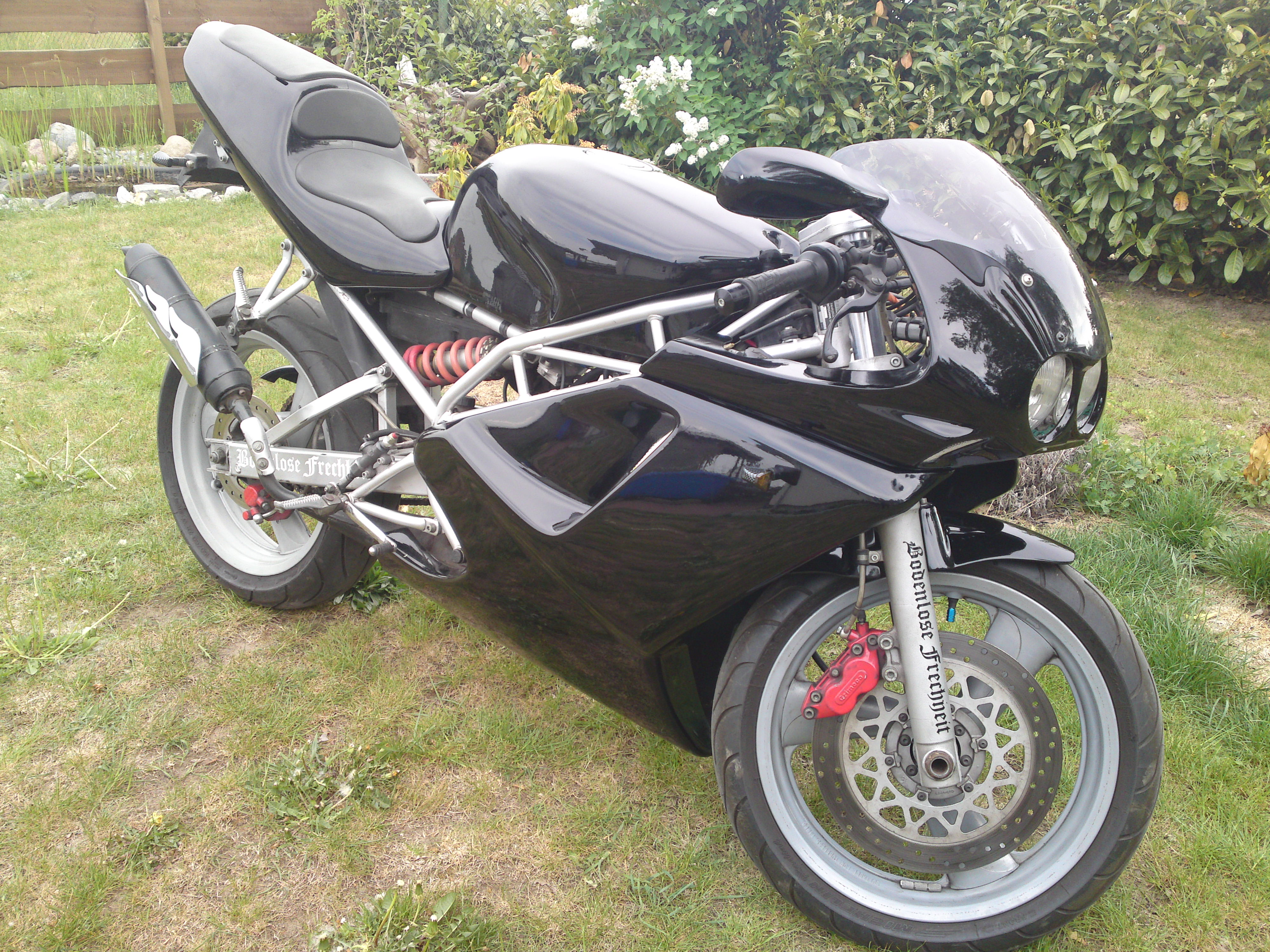
Sachs XTC 125

- 150KN (Sold in Australia as "Express")
- B-805
- Balboa
- Bee 50 and Bee 125
- Big Roadster V 3.8
- City 125
- City 150
- Dirty Devil 50
- Dirty Devil 110
- MadAss
- Prima
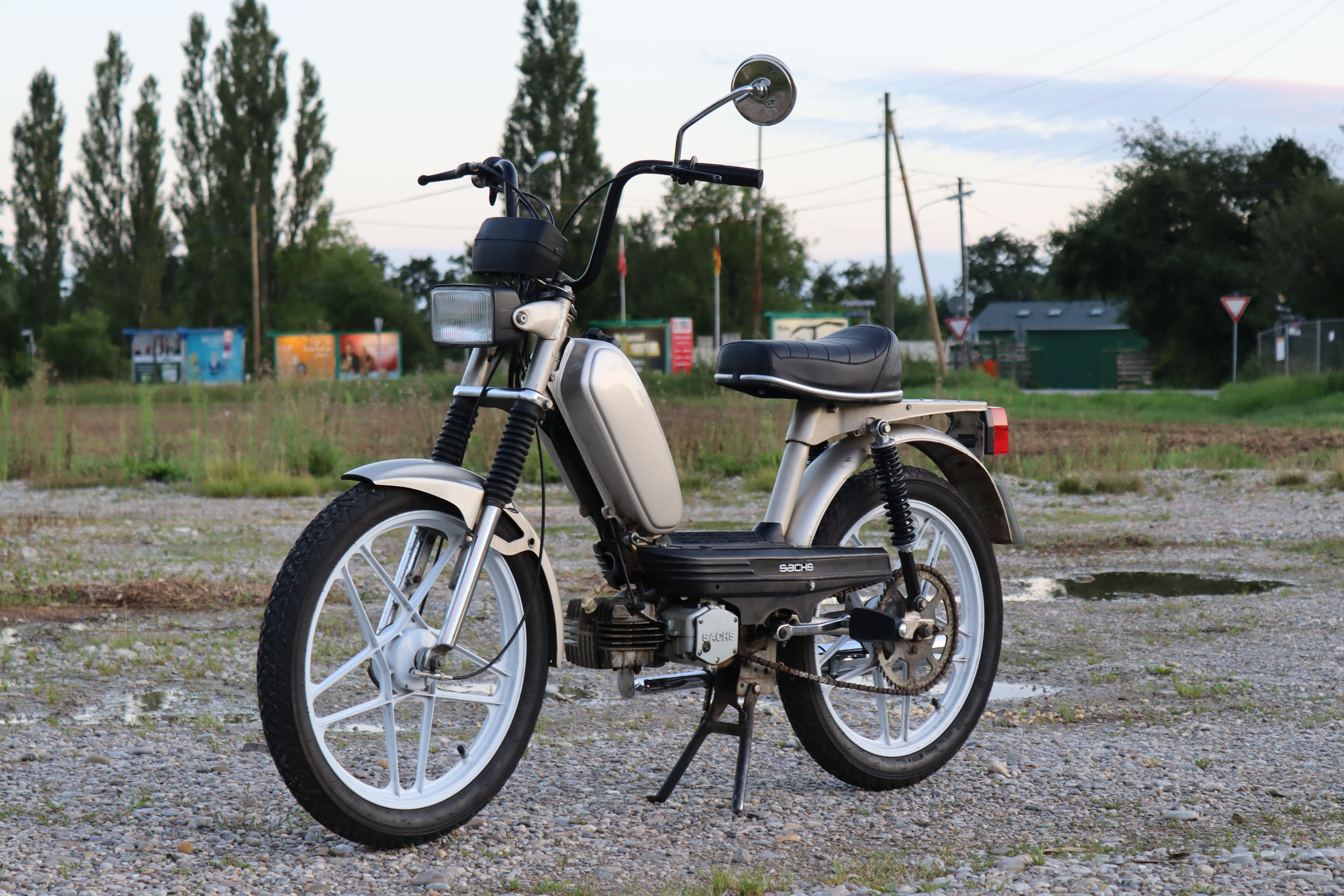
  Sachs Prima 4
- Prima G3
- Roadster 650
- Hercules
- Roadster 800
- Roadster V 1.6
- Roadster 125 V2
- Roadster 2000
- Seville
- Speedjet R 50 (Air cooled)
- Speedjet RS 50 (Liquid cooled intr. 2010)
- SR 125
- SX-1
- SX-1 (Urbano Limited Edition)
- VS 125
- Westlake
- X Road
- XTC 125
- XTC-N
- XTC-R
- ZZ 125
- ZX 125
- Speedster 250cc (America Latina)
- Rsv 180cc (America Latina)
