= Mount of Olives group =

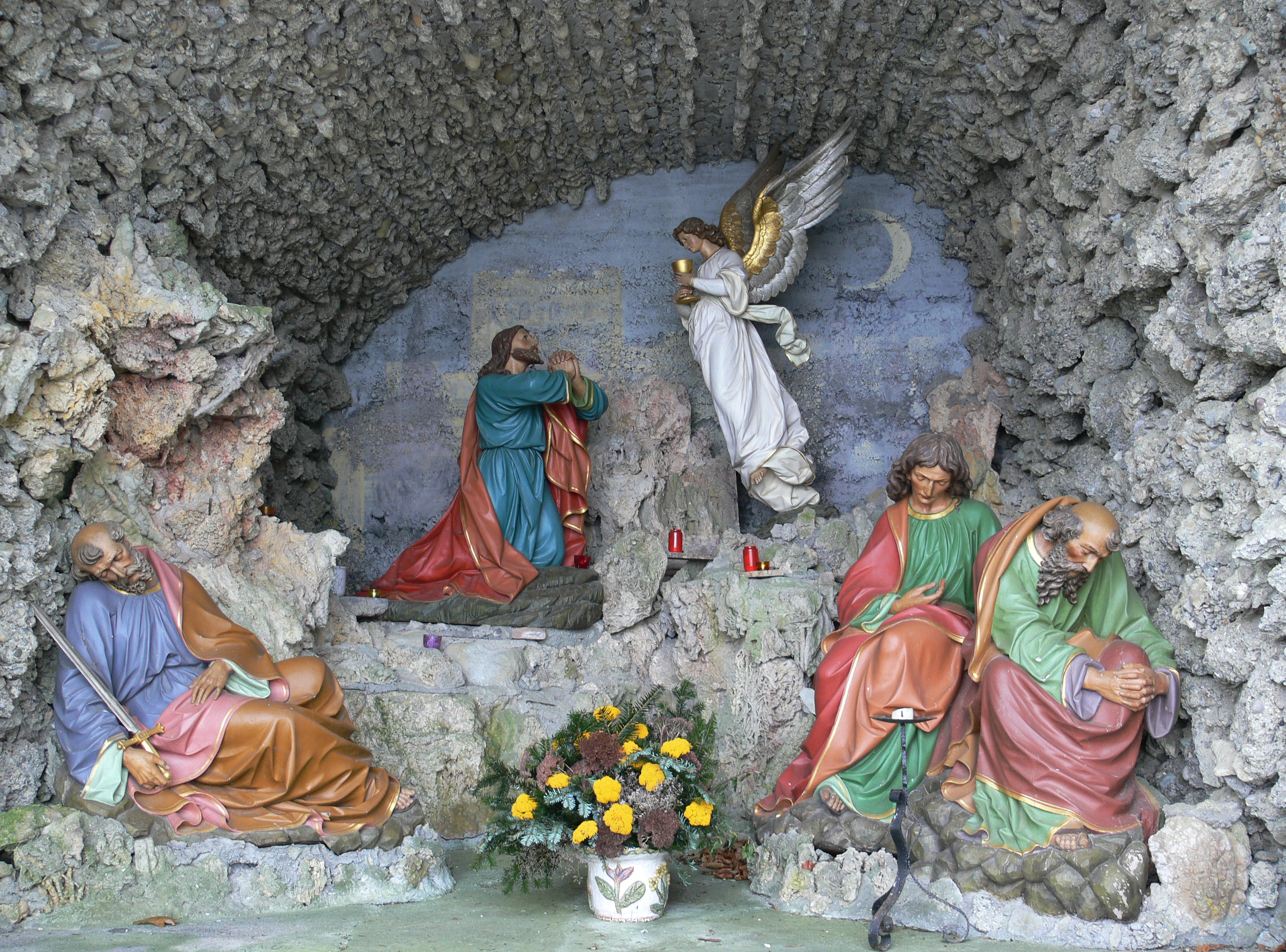
Mount of Olives group by Moriz Schlachter, 1898 (Wolketsweiler)

In Christian art, a Mount of Olives group (German: Ölberggruppe) is a sculptural representation of the biblical scene where Jesus prays with his disciples in the garden of Gethsemane on the night before his crucifixion. These representations often strived for realistic details with entire landscapes including rocks, fences, trees, and life-size figures of the kneeling Savior, the sleeping disciples, and the approaching henchmen were constructed in front of or inside churches.

These ensembles were part of the new phase of "the Gothic tendency to visualize salvation" of the late 15th century and were particularly popular in the German-speaking regions of Northern Europe in the 15th century.

== Description and iconography ==
The Mount of Olives scene is mentioned several times in the Gospels (Matthew 26, Mark 14, and Luke 22) and generally reflected in visual arts as "Agony in the Garden".

The sculptural group functions as a stationary, three-dimensional tableau. It usually consists of a kneeling figure of Jesus in prayer and figures of the sleeping disciples Peter, John, and James. It also typically includes an Angel, who strengthens Jesus in his agony (Luke 22:43) and simultaneously holds a chalice, which is the figurative object of his prayer. In the context of the Rosary, the specific mystery associated with this scene is "Jesus, who sweat blood for us".

The figures often possess distinct iconographic attributes: Jesus is typically depicted kneeling, often wearing a simple tunic, Peter usually has a short beard, a bald head, and holds a book; he may also hold a sword (referencing the striking of Malchus) or a key. background figures are larger ensembles sometimes including figures of Judas and Roman soldiers made at a smaller scale to indicate approach from the distance for the coming arrest.

The staging of these groups could vary from simple painted niches to elaborate mise-en-scène environments. These might include landscape elements and physical props such as dried plants, clothing, or weapons to enhance the realism of the narrative.

== History of the representation ==
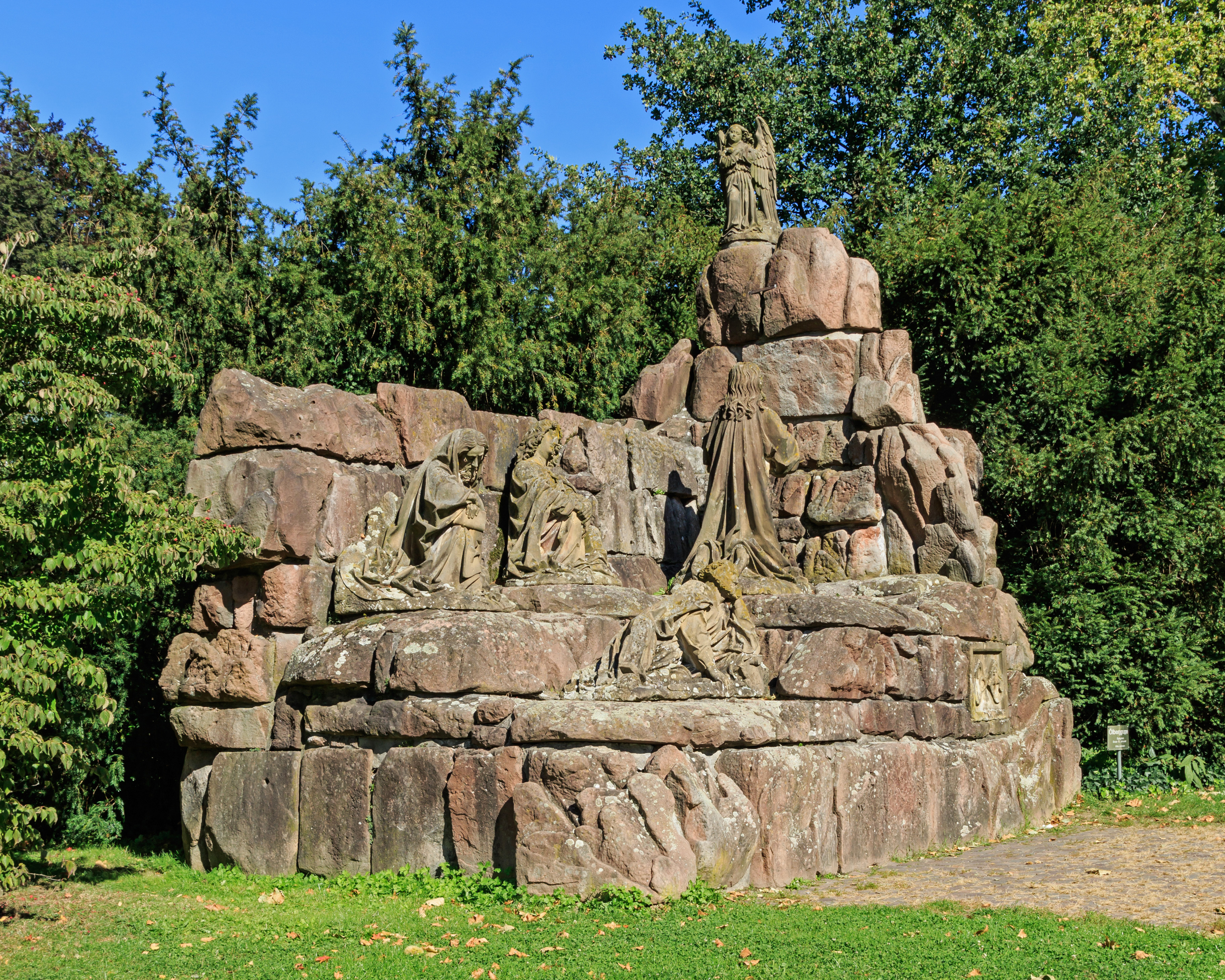
Late Gothic group in Baden-Baden

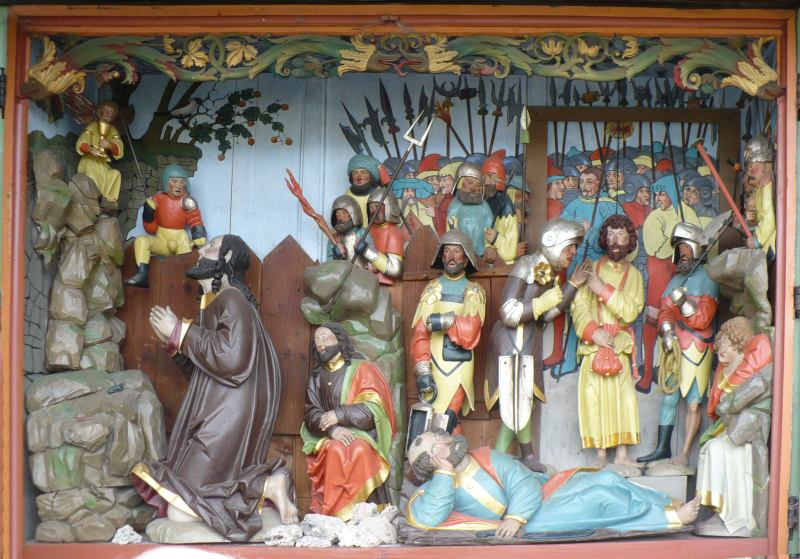
Group from c. 1512 in Murrhardt

Mount of Olives groups originated as places of devotion in the Christian lands after the ideas of the Crusades had been abandoned and access to the original sites in the Holy Land had become difficult following the Islamic conquest of Constantinople in 1453.

By around 1500, almost every Catholic parish church in Central Europe possessed a Mount of Olives group, either as a relief or a fully three-dimensional sculpture. The group was typically set up on the south side or the cemetery side of the church to serve as a theme of admonition and comfort. Placing these groups in exterior alcoves exposed them to the elements; consequently, terracotta became a popular medium for these sculptures in Franconia, the Middle Rhine, and the Alpine regions during the 15th century due to its durability compared to wood and ease of production compared to stone.

The sculptures were also preserved on the exterior walls of Protestant churches in the post-Reformation period, as they were not counted among what the Reformers termed "idols".

After 1750, Stations of the Cross representations increasingly replaced Mount of Olives groups in Catholic areas. In the 1950s, many of these folk art works were removed. Recently, the tradition of the Mount of Olives group has seen a revival.

== Notable Mount of Olives groups ==
- Mount of Olives group by Hans von Leipzig, Protestant St. Peter und Paul in Delitzsch (1408) (restored 1985/89).
- Mount of Olives group at St. James' Church in Rothenburg ob der Tauber (1450/60 and 1506/07).
- Mount of Olives group by Tilman Riemenschneider, Catholic parish church of St. Laurentius in Heidingsfeld (c. 1505–1510).
- Mount of Olives group from 1512 on the exterior of the Walterichskirche in Murrhardt.
- Mount of Olives group at the Lorenzkirche in Nuremberg.
- Mount of Olives group at the Church of St. Michael in Schwäbisch Hall.
- Mount of Olives group by Moriz Schlachter in the Swabian village of Wolketsweiler (1898).
- Mount of Olives landscape garden in Görlitz.
- Group in St. Anne's Chapel in Mils, Tyrol.
- Group at the south wall of church of Our Lady in Katzwang, Bavaria.

== See also ==
- Calvary (monument), a similar type of monument in Brittany

== Sources ==
- Dalman, Gustaf (1922). Das Grab Christi in Deutschland [The Tomb of Christ in Germany]. Studien über christliche Denkmäler (in German). Vol. 14. Leipzig: Dieterich.
- Sam Fogg (n.d.). "Christ and a Sleeping Apostle from an Agony in the Garden group" (PDF). London.
- Kroesen, J.E.A. (2000). The Sepulchrum Domini Through the Ages: Its Form and Function. Liturgia Condenda Series. Peeters. ISBN 978-90-429-0952-6.
- Munk, Dieter (1968). Die Ölberg-Darstellung in der Monumentalplastik Süddeutschlands. Untersuchung und Katalog [The Mount of Olives representation in the monumental sculpture of Southern Germany. Investigation and catalogue] (Doctorate thesis) (in German). Erlangen: J. Hogl.
