= Victoria (motorcycle) =

Defunct German bicycle and motorcycle manufacturer

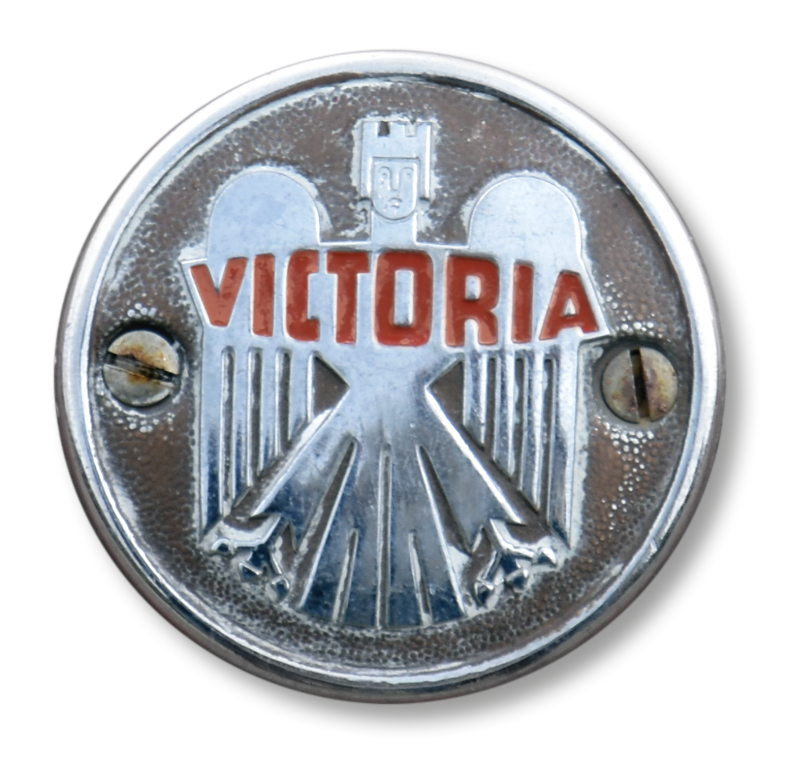
- Industry: Manufacture of motorcycles vehicle construction
- Founded: 1901
- Defunct: 1966
- Fate: Merged
- Successor: Zweirad Union, Hercules
- Headquarters: Nuremberg, Germany
- Products: motorcycles

Victoria was a bicycle manufacturer in Nürnberg, Germany that made motorcycles from about 1901 until 1966. It should not be confused with a lesser-known, unrelated Victoria Motorcycle Company in Glasgow, Scotland that made motorcycles between 1902 and 1928.

In its early decades Victoria in Nürnberg fitted proprietary engines purchased from various manufacturers including Fafnir, FN, Minerva and Zédel.

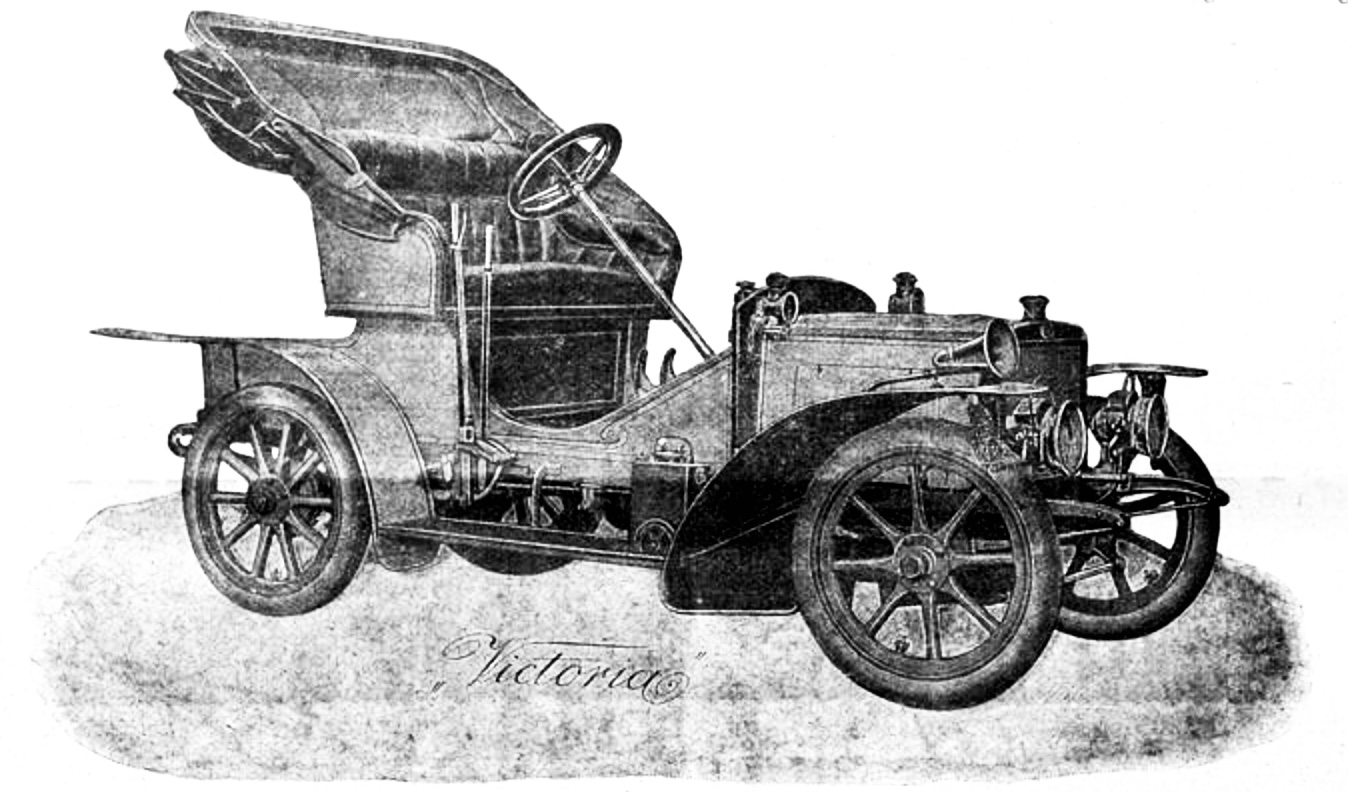
Victoria-Werke 7 HP (1905-1908)

== 1920–1932 ==
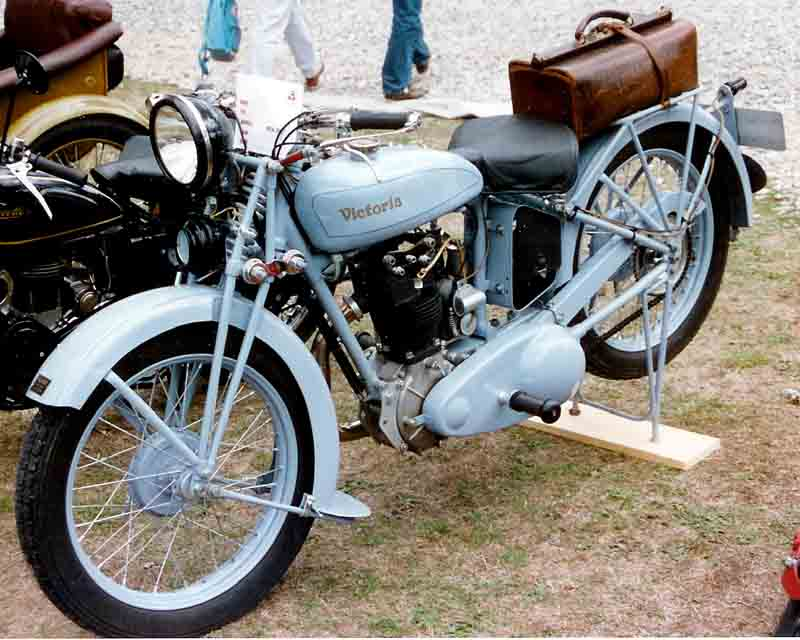
Victoria 1929.

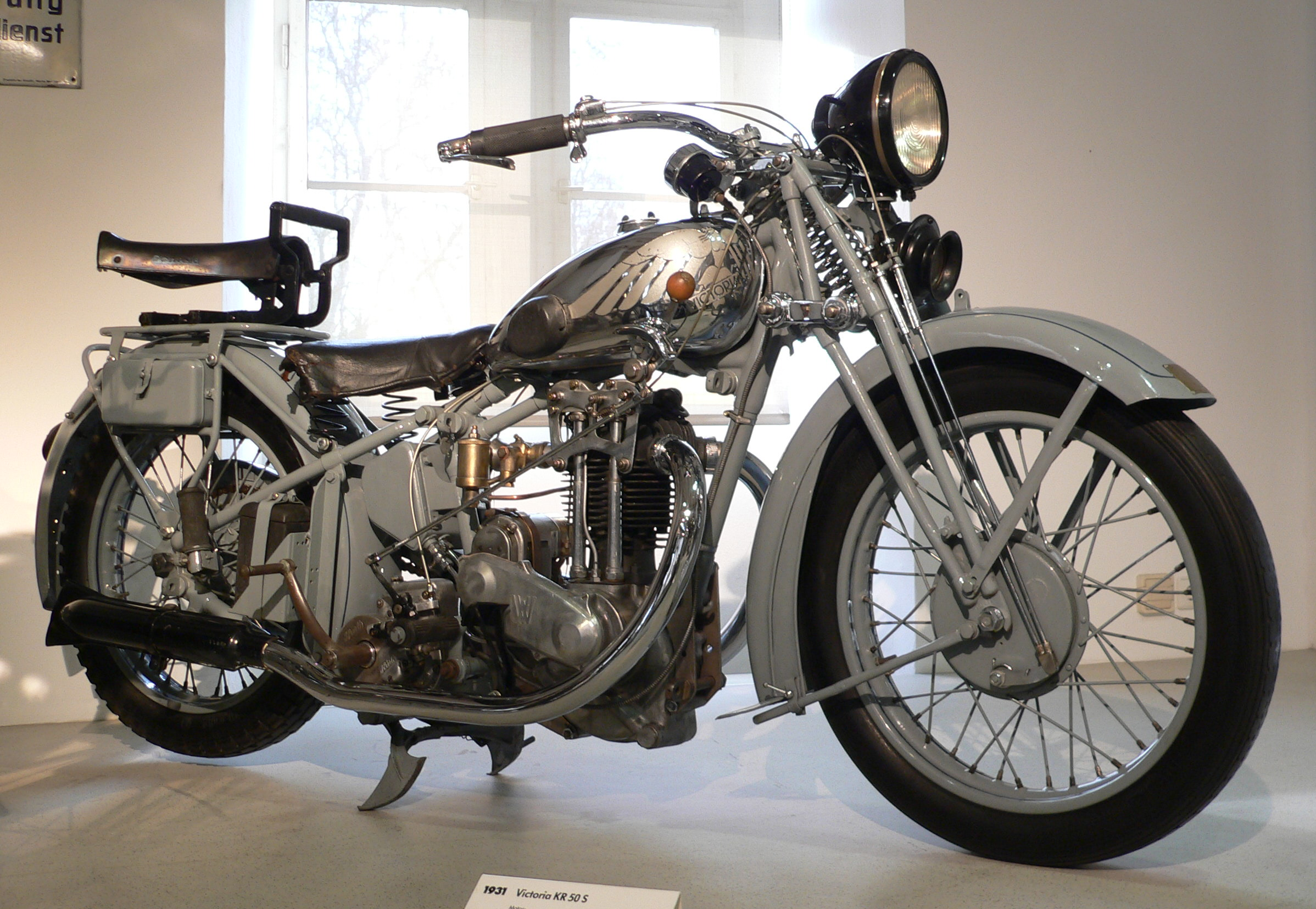
1931 Victoria KR 50 S in the Zweirad-Museum Neckarsulm

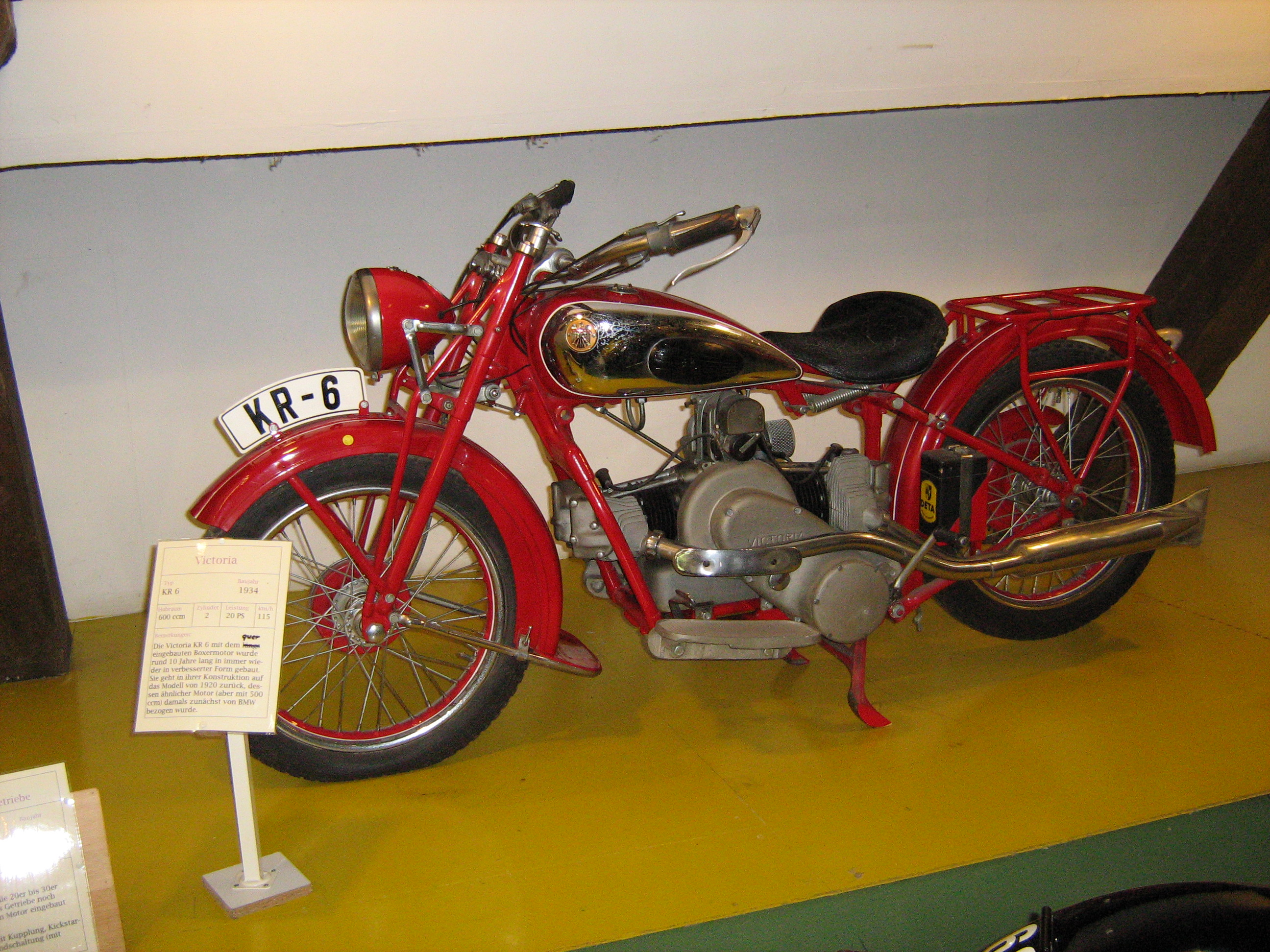
1934 Victoria KR 6

In 1920 Victoria launched the model KR 1, which has a 494 cc BMW twin-cylinder side-valve flat twin (boxer engine) mounted longitudinally in the motorcycle frame. The engine produced 6.5 bhp (4.8 kW) and transmission was via a two-speed gearbox.

When BMW started making its own motorcycles, Victoria turned to making its own engines. In 1923 Victoria launched its KR 2, an overhead valve (OHV) flat twin producing 9 horsepower (6.7 kW). In 1924 Victoria followed this with the KR 3, which produces 12 horsepower (8.9 kW) and has a 3-speed gearbox. In 1925 Victoria built Germany's first forced induction engine, and in 1926 a 496 cc Victoria achieved a motorcycle Land speed record of 165 km/h (102.5 MPH). In 1927 Victoria launched the 596 cc KR VI or KR 6. Based on this model the factory offered a high-speed sports model with twin carburettors that produced 24 bhp (18 kW), later named the KR 7.

At the same time Victoria also offered the 200 cc side-valve KR 20 and 350 cc overhead valve KR 35 models. In 1930/31 it added to its range the KR 50 (side-valve) and KR 50 S (overhead valve) models, which have engines imported from Sturmey-Archer in England.

In 1932 Victoria won the sidecar class of the European Hill Climb Championship with a 600 cc machine and thereafter offered a model with 20 bhp (15 kW) and a four-speed gearbox as the KR 6 Bergmeister. At the same time it offered the KR 15 and KR 20 Z models with 150 cc and 200 cc two-stroke engines supplied by ILO.

== 1933–1945 ==
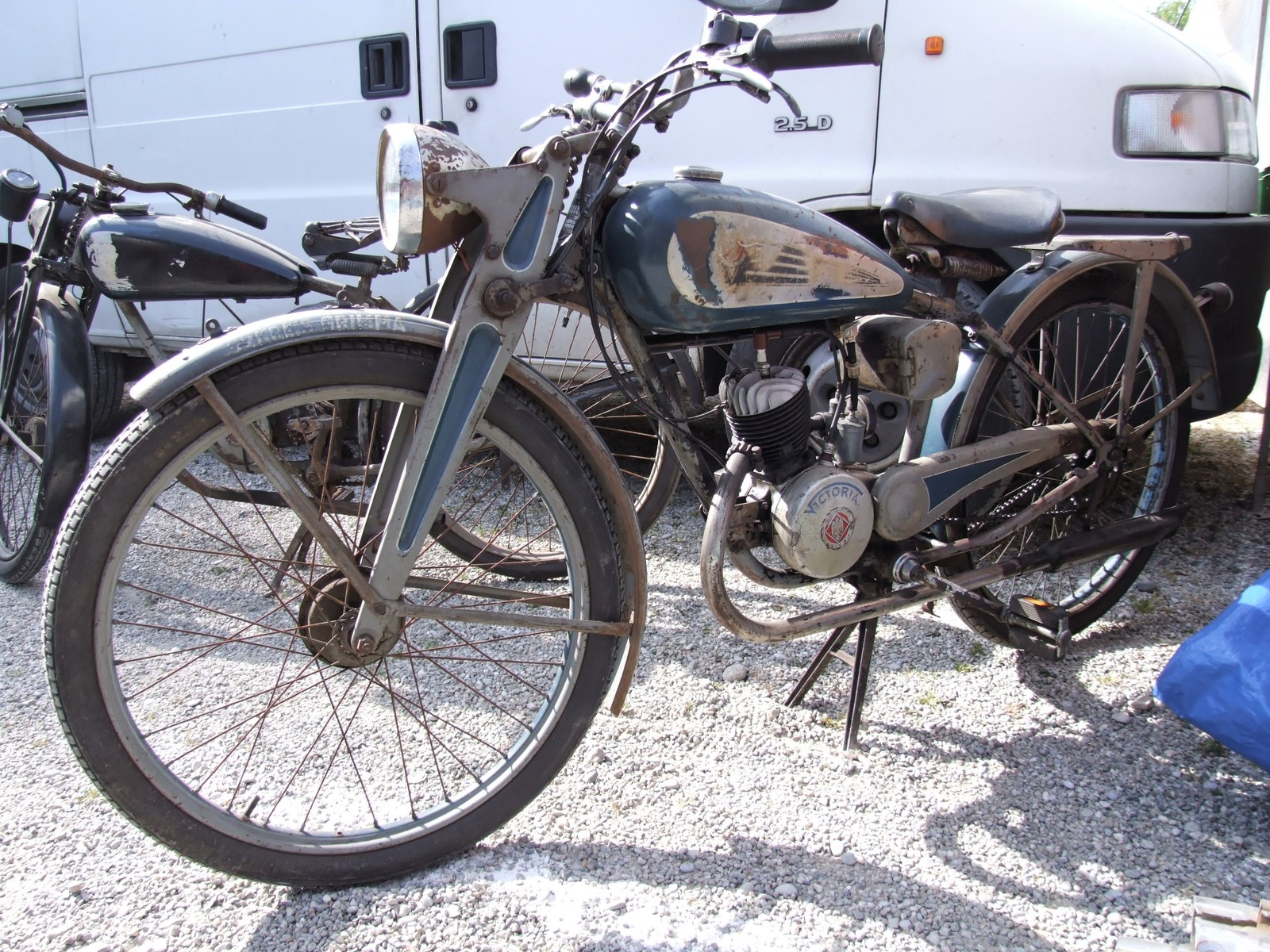
1939 Victoria V 99 Fix

In 1933 Victoria introduced a 500 cc parallel twin, the KR 8. This had a side-valve engine with its cylinder block inclined forwards almost horizontally. This placed the valves under the cylinder head, where the exhaust valves suffered from overheating.

In 1934 the National Socialist government forbade the import of foreign components, which ended Victoria's use of Sturmey-Archer engines.

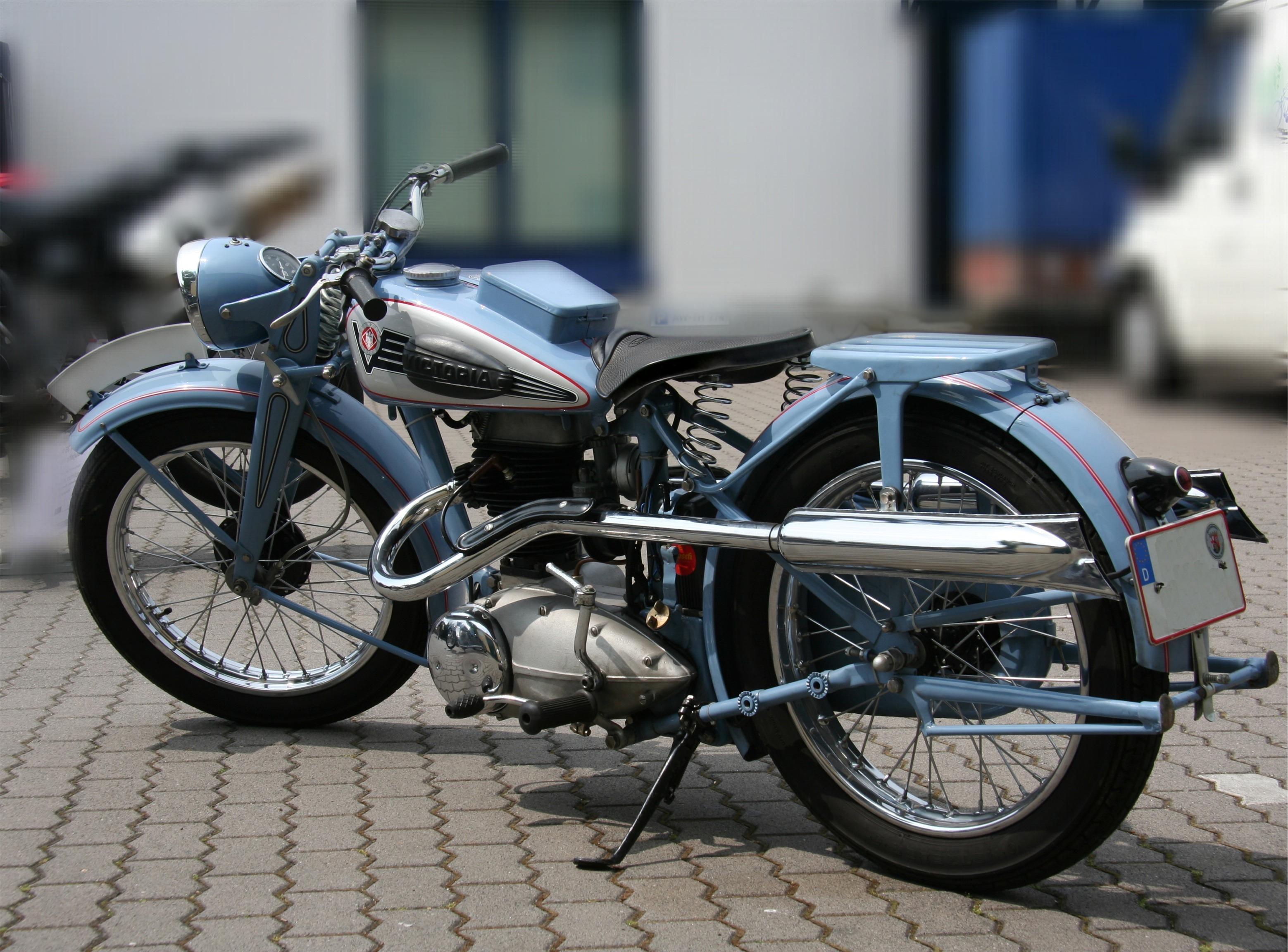
1942 Victoria KR 35 Pionier

In 1935 Victoria revised the KR 8 engine to the unusual exhaust over inlet (EOI) valve layout, and called the resulting model the KR 9 Fahrmeister. Using EOI on a nearly horizontal engine placed the exhaust valves in cooler air at the front and solved the overheating. Unfortunately it also increased the complexity and cost of manufacture and maintenance. Victoria discontinued the KR 9 after 1935.

Also in 1935 Victoria introduced the 350 cc KR 35 B and KR 35 G models with Lackler-patented cylinder heads. In 1937 the first KR 35 Sport was built with a Columbus engine. In the same year Victoria introduced new KR 20 LN Lux and KR 25 S Aero two-stroke models, whose engines with flat-topped pistons were developed by Richard and Xaver Küchen. In 1938 Victoria offered the Columbus-engined KR 35 SN (18 bhp) and KR 35 SS (20 bhp) models. At the same time Victoria expanded its range of two-strokes with the lightweight V 99 Fix, V 109 Fix (which was a ladies' version of the V 99 Fix), KR 12-N and KR 15-N.

In 1939 the Second World War almost completely halted production of the KR 35 Pionier, although limited production continued until at least 1942. In 1945 the Victoria factory's production hall was severely damaged.

== 1946–1966 ==
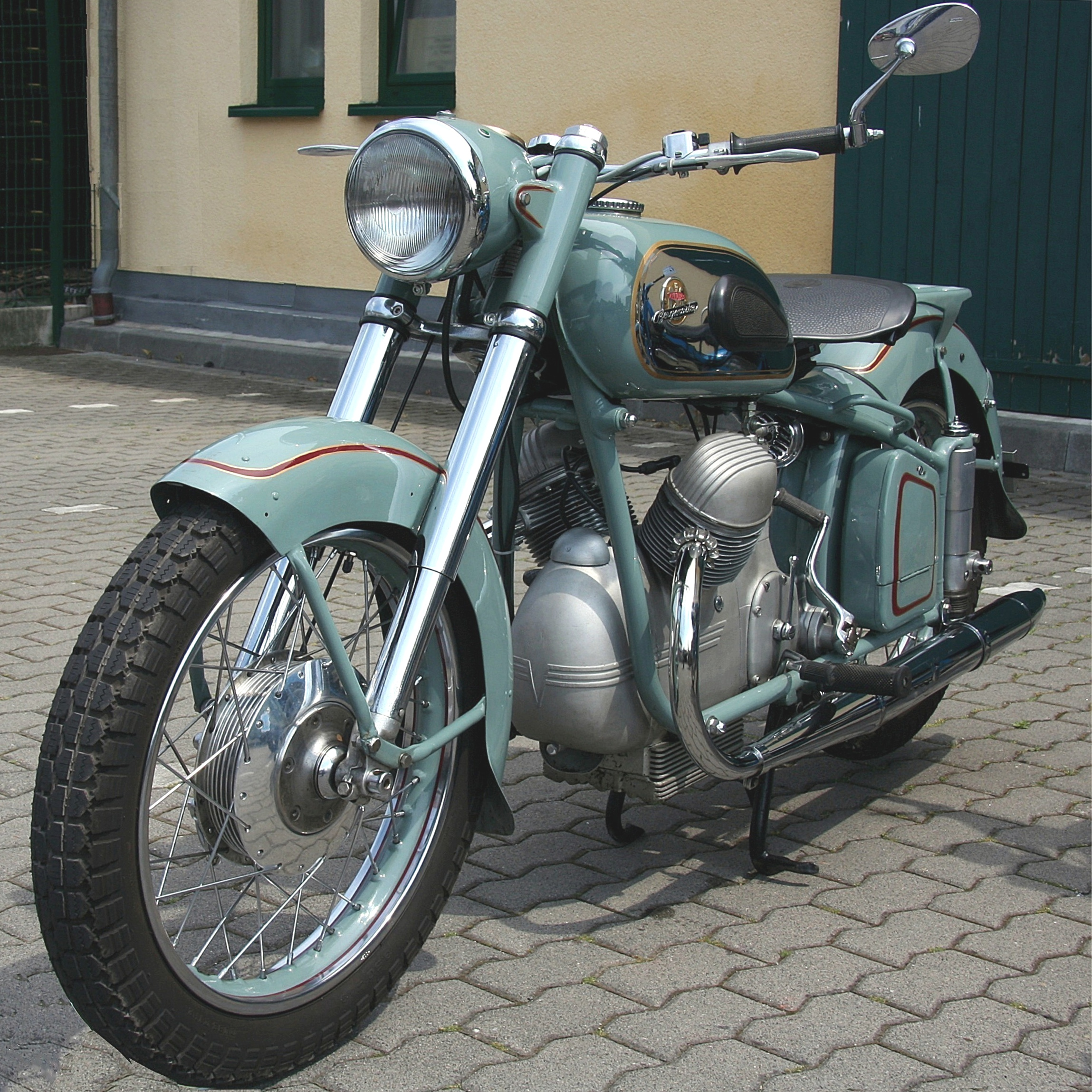
1954 Victoria V35 Bergmeister

In 1946 Victoria resumed production with the 38 cc FM 38 bicycle engine. In 1949 the company resumed production of the pre-war KR 25 Aero model. In 1950 Victoria introduced the 99 cc V 99 BL-Fix and modernised the KR 25 Aero with a telescopic front fork. At the same time the company built the models Vicky I and Vicky II using the FM 38 bicycle engine. By the end of the year KR 25 Aero production was 14,000 per year, and from 1951 the model was equipped with Jurisch plunger rear suspension.

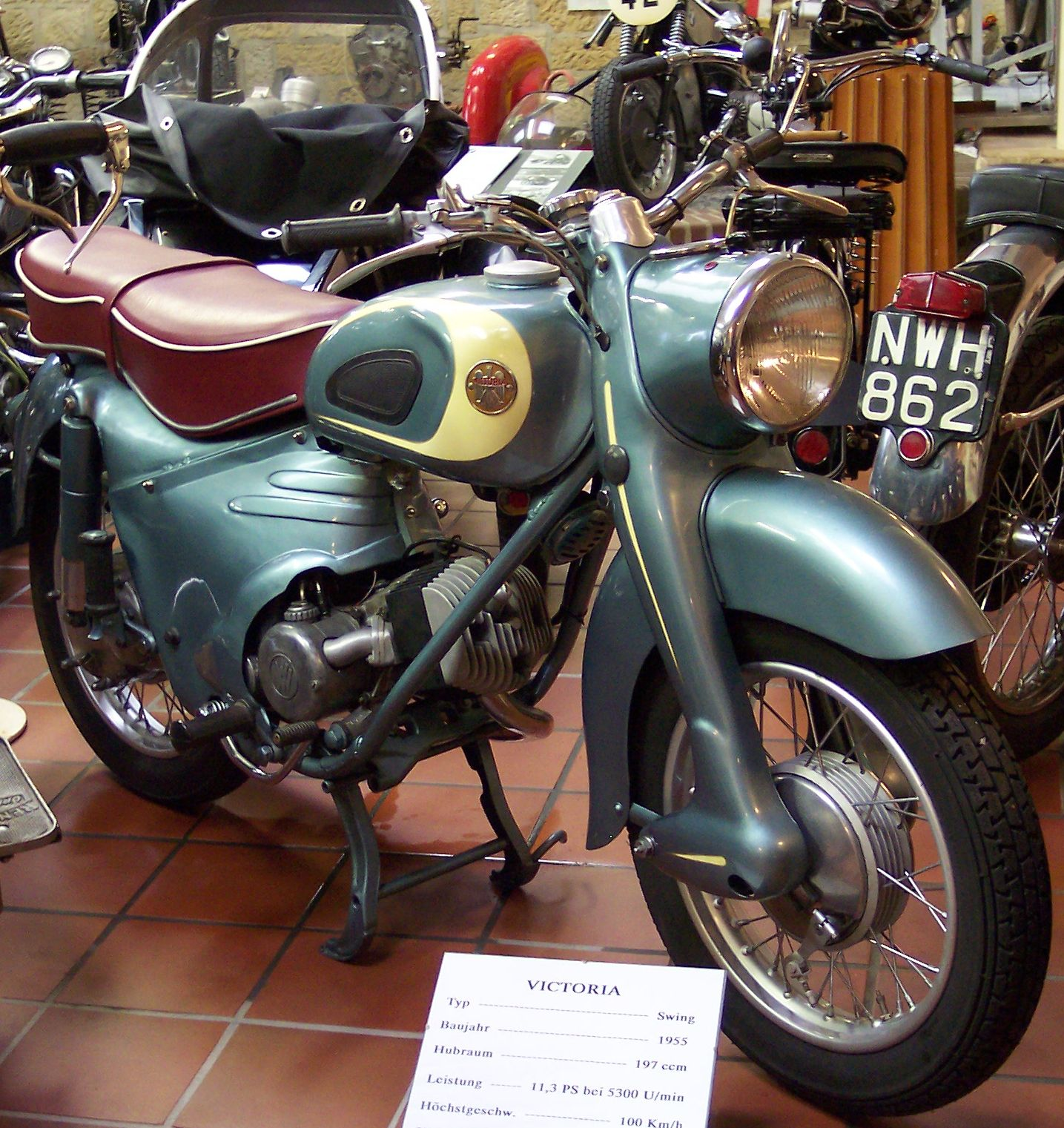
1955 Victoria KR 21 Swing in the Motorradmuseum Ibbenbüren

In 1953 Victoria developed its popular model further as the KR 26 Aero, and expanded its range with the new Küchen-designed V 35 Bergmeister. The V 35 is a 350 cc OHV four-stroke V-twin producing 21 bhp (16 kW). The V 35's powertrain combines chain primary drive to the gearbox with shaft drive to the rear wheel. The Bergmeister was highly over engineered and very expensive to buy. After about 1,000 motorcycles had been made the model was scrapped due to poor sales. The Bergmeister is one of the rarest motorcycles in the world today, with only a few known survivors

In 1955 Victoria introduced the Peggy motor scooter, which has a 200 cc fan-cooled two-stroke engine and an electric starter. In the same year the company also offered the technologically advanced—but consequently expensive—KR 21 Swing motorcycle.

In 1957 Victoria launched a new model with a 175 cc OHV four-stroke engine imported from Parilla in [: the KR 17 Parilla.

In 1958 Victoria merged with DKW and Express Werke AG, forming Zweirad Union, which continued the Victoria name for mopeds including the Vicky and motor scooters. In 1966 Hercules took over Zweirad Union and terminated Victoria production.

== Vicky ==
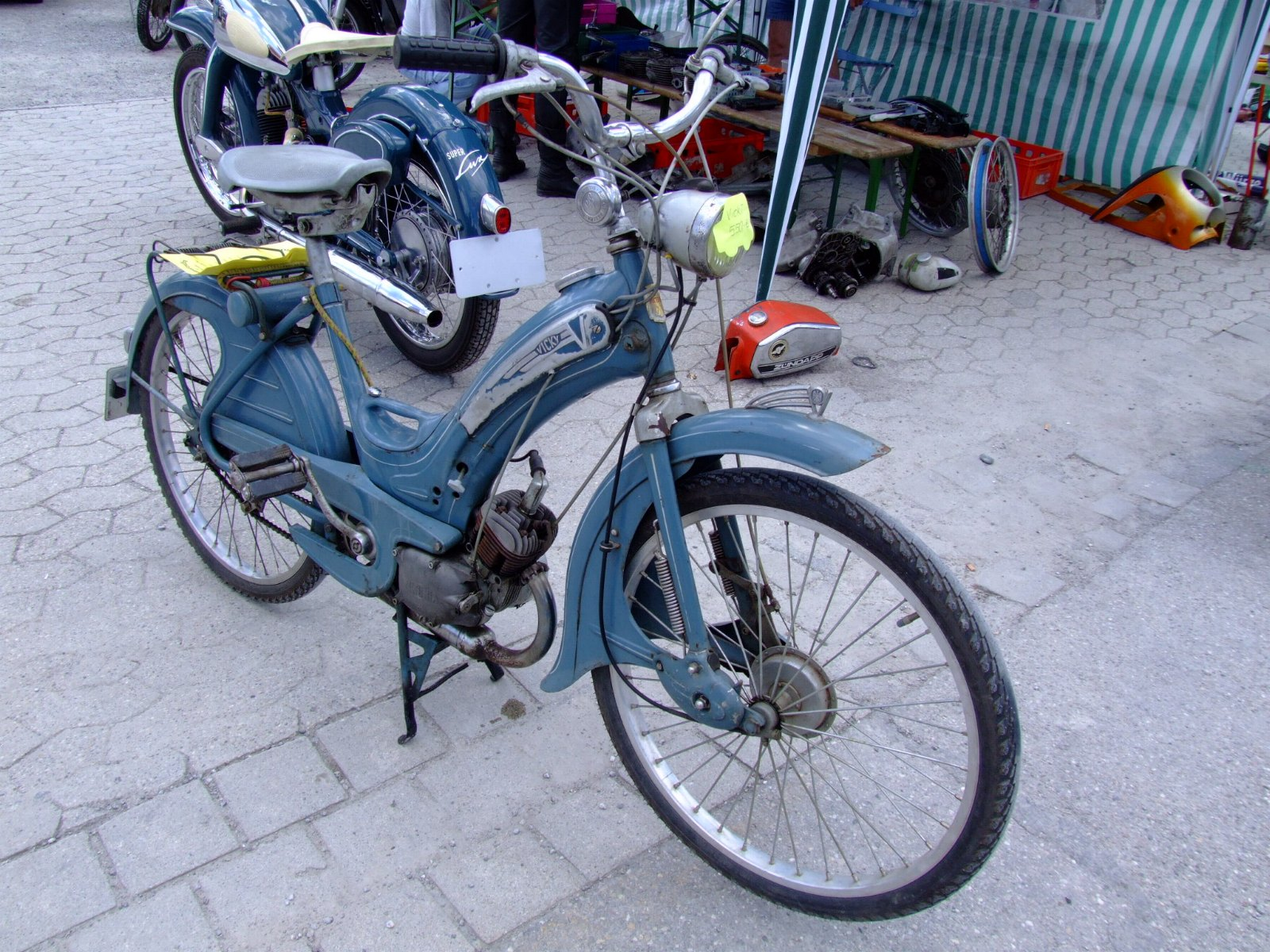
1954 Victoria Vicky

In 1954 Victoria introduced the Vicky moped, designated 'model III'. Vicky had a 2-stroke 48cc engine. The Vicky III was imported into Great Britain from January 1956. In Sweden it was marketed as the MS50.

Saund Zweirad Union India Ltd. manufactured Vicky mopeds in the city of Gwalior, India in the early 1970s

== Relaunch of the brand Victoria Motorrad ==
In August 2021 the Chinese motorcycle manufacturer Ningbo Longjia Motorcycle (formerly Longjia) acquired the trademark Victoria Motorrad and launched a retro-scooter called Victoria Sixtees.

A second model unveiled in November 2023 is a cruiser-style motorcycle with a 675cc V2 engine, called Victoria Simplee V7.

== See also ==
- Vi-Vi scooter
- List of motorcycles of the 1920s
