= Tableau (sculpture) =

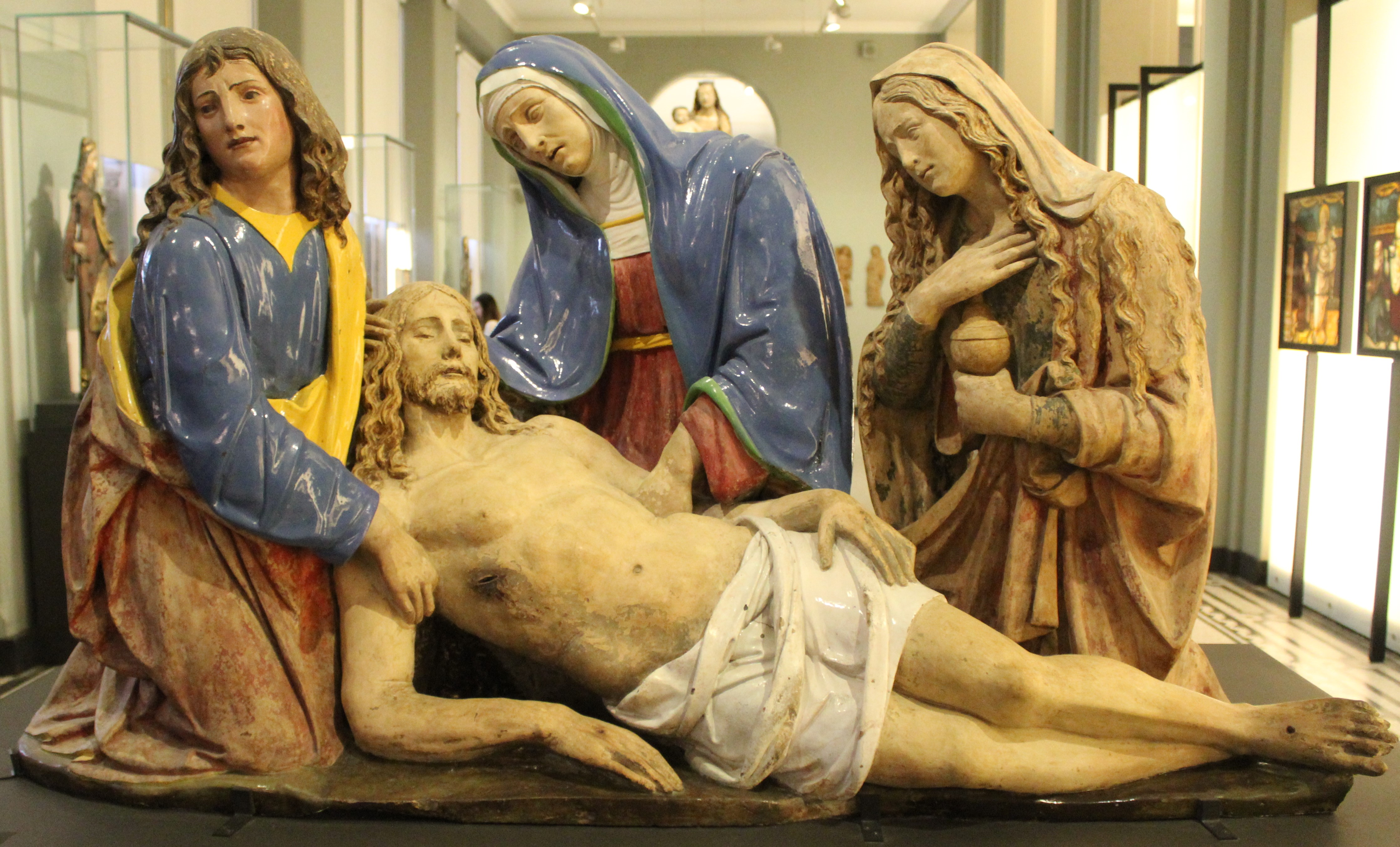
The Lamentation Over the Dead Christ terracotta tableau (workshop of Andrea della Robbia, c. 1510-1515)

In sculpture, the tableau refers to a genre of large-scale, usually polychrome sculptural groups that flourished in many European countries in the 15th–16th centuries. The term is applied by art historians to both historical staged arrangements of religious figures, made from terracotta or in mixed "non-precious" materials, and to the modern life-size installations.

Renaissance tableaux are characterized by life-size figures, intense realism, and expressive pathos, in Italy these tableaux frequently depicted the Lamentation and represented a specific development in the art of the period. In the German-speaking lands, the typical motif was the Mount of Olives group. While usually marginalized in art history scholarship as a form of "popular" or low art compared to marble and bronze, recent scholarship has repositioned the genre as a significant form of figurative sculpture that engaged with complex theological and political ideologies of the era. Use of the term "tableau" to designate the terracotta groups became popular in English-language scholarship after the 1982 essay "Were this Clay but Marble" by Kathleen Weil.Garris.

== Renaissance ==
The development of the terracotta tableau is closely linked to the versatility of terracotta as a medium, which allowed for a high degree of mimesis and the rendering of "embodied passions" difficult to achieve in stone. The genre's roots are often traced to medieval devotion, but the specific rise of the Lamentation tableau in the mid-15th century is connected to a resurgence of crusade rhetoric following the Fall of Constantinople in 1453. For the same reason, access to the original pilgrimage sites in the Holy Land had become difficult.

In Italy, the genre reached its apogee in the works of artists such as Niccolò dell'Arca and Guido Mazzoni, whose Lamentation groups are considered potent examples of the Renaissance fascination with the "living image"—figures so lifelike they appear to lack only speech. These sculptures were frequently housed in Sepulchre chapels, serving as localized "New Jerusalems" that allowed viewers to engage in immersive, compassionate devotion.

By around 1500, almost every Catholic parish church in Central Europe possessed a Mount of Olives group, either as a relief or a fully three-dimensional sculpture. The group was typically set up on the south side or the cemetery side of the church to serve as a theme of admonition and comfort. Placing these groups in exterior alcoves exposed them to the elements; consequently, terracotta became a popular medium for these sculptures in Franconia, the Middle Rhine, and the Alpine regions during the 15th century due to its durability compared to wood and ease of production compared to stone.

Antonio Begarelli (c. 1499-1565) carried on the tradition of tableau sculpture made of inexpensive materials and painted "veristically" in opposition to white-marble used in the contemporary "high sculpture". The latter was based on the (mistaken) beliefs by Michelangelo and his circle that the ancient Roman sculptures were white.

=== Political and religious function ===
Beyond their devotional function, tableaux served as vehicles for civic and courtly propaganda. For confraternities like the Santa Maria della Vita in Bologna, the commission of Niccolò dell'Arca's Lamentation (1463) provided an opportunity to assert its social and political influence by reminding of the group's historical origins in the crusade movement. Similarly, for princely patrons such as the Este in Ferrara and the Aragonese in Naples, Guido Mazzoni's tableaux were used to craft political images rooted in chivalric ideals of piety and the defense of the Holy Sepulchre. The genre eventually evolved into the elaborate multi-chapel complexes of the Sacri Monti, such as the Sacro Monte di Varallo, where the tableau format was used to narrate the topography of the Holy Land.

=== Decline ===
The popularity of the terracotta tableau waned in the 16th century, largely due to the aesthetic shifts driven by the Paragone debates, which privileged the "subtractive" method of marble carving over the "additive" method of modeling clay. Theoretical biases championed by figures such as Benedetto Varchi and Giorgio Vasari helped establish a hierarchy of materials that relegated polychrome terracotta to the margins of the canon.

== Modern ==
During the 1960s, the tableau developed as a distinct direction within assemblage, contrasting the simultaneous nature of serial art with a centralized focus. Despite these structural differences, both forms shared a concern with relating to space and time through action, often soliciting direct involvement from the spectator. Serving as a precedent for modern multimedia installations, the Merz sculptures (1921–1933) by the German Dadaist Kurt Schwitters, directly engaged the viewers through elements of theater, architecture, poetry, and music.

The American artist Edward Kienholz extended the medium dramatically, utilizing debris, machine parts, and domestic paraphernalia to imbue his compositions with verisimilitude. While his use of materials displayed a "calculated authenticity" rooted in his background as a cabinetmaker, his stylistic approach evolved from folk art (John Doe, 1959) to complex social commentary. His tableau The State Hospital (1964–1966) utilized abstraction and empty head forms reflected surrealistic attitudes.

Notable contemporary sculptors producing the tableaux include George Segal and Marisol Escobar. Segal's technique involves casting plaster figures directly from life, and occasionally re-casting them in bronze while retaining the original white color. His subjects are combined with architectural forms and associative objects, like walking into a bus station or operating a steel plant, and evoke a "poetry in the ordinary". Marisol combined multiple materials (wood, resin, plaster, and found materials) into pieces that comment on conformity, fashion, and the isolation of humans.

== Sources ==
- Dümpelmann, Britta (2023). "Fictitiousness in Non-Polychrome Renaissance Sculpture". In Bol, Marjolijn; Spary, E. C. (eds.). The Matter of Mimesis: Studies of Mimesis and Materials in Nature, Art, and Science. Leiden: Brill. pp. 187–217. doi:10.1163/9789004515413_012. ISBN 978-90-04-51541-3.
- Sam Fogg (n.d.). "Christ and a Sleeping Apostle from an Agony in the Garden group" (PDF). London.
- Purvis, Betsy Bennett (2012). Palpable Politics and Embodied Passions: Terracotta Tableau Sculpture in Italy, 1450-1530 (PhD). University of Toronto.
- Vranic, Ivana (2019). Making and Remaking Renaissance Sculpture: The Terracotta Groups (1460-1560) (PhD dissertation). Vancouver: University of British Columbia.
- Weil-Garris, Kathleen (1982). "'Were this Clay but Marble': A Reassessment of Emilian Terra Cotta Group Sculpture". In Emiliani, Andrea (ed.). Le arti a Bologna e in Emilia dal XVI al XVII secolo. Atti del XXIV Congresso internazionale di Storia dell’Arte. Vol. 4. Bologna: CLUEB. pp. 61–79.
- Widman, Lorraine Balmuth (1989). Sculpture, a Studio Guide: Concepts, Methods, and Materials. Englewood Cliffs, N.J.: Prentice Hall. ISBN 978-0-13-796590-8.
