= Brütsch Mopetta =

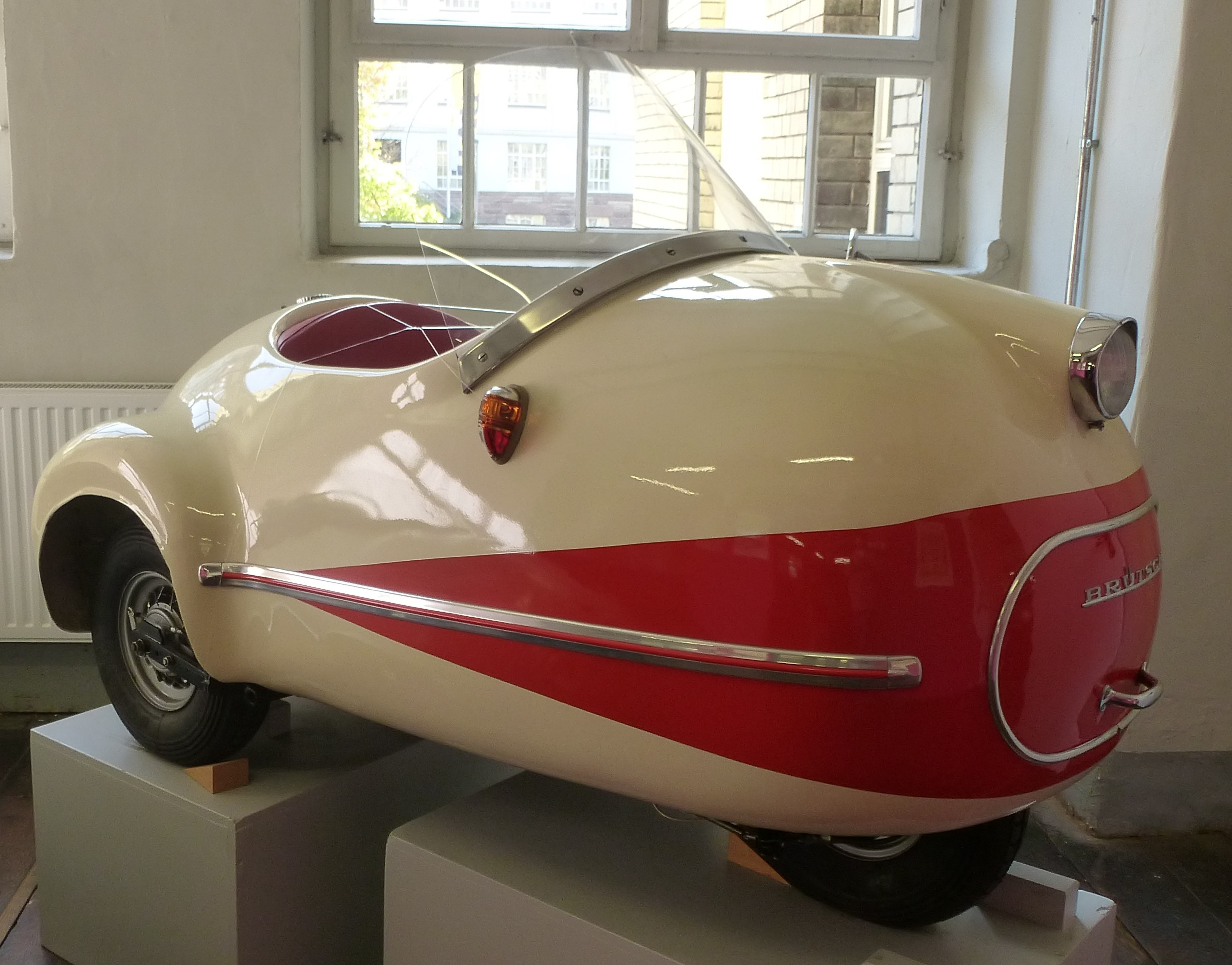
- Brütsch Mopetta on display at the Auto & Uhrenwelt Schramberg in Schramberg, Germany

Overview
- Manufacturer: Egon Brütsch Fahrzeugbau
- Production: 1956–1958
- Assembly: Germany: Stuttgart
- Designer: Egon Brütsch

Body and chassis
- Class: Microcar
- Body style: Convertible
- Layout: Rear-wheel-drive by chain

Powertrain
- Engine: ILO-Motorenwerke V50 50 cc (3 cu in) Single cylinder 2 stroke
- Transmission: 3-speed manual

Dimensions
- Wheelbase: 3 ft 4.5 in (1,029 mm)
- Length: 5 ft 9.5 in (1,765 mm)
- Width: 3 ft 0 in (910 mm)
- Height: 3 ft 9.25 in (1,149.3 mm)
- Kerb weight: 1.75 long cwt (89 kg)

The Brütsch Mopetta is an egg-shaped, single-seat, three-wheel automobile manufactured from 1956 to 1958 with a total production of 14. It was the smallest in a series of microcars designed by Egon Brütsch.

With a single wheel at the front, the Mopetta is an open roadster with a fiberglass body, with one example having a detachable, transparent, folding hood. The Mopetta used a 50 cc (3 cu in) ILO V50 engine with a pull start and an integral three-speed gearbox.

Top speed was tested at 22 mph (35 km/h), with an average fuel consumption of 111 mpg_{‑imp} (2.5 L/100 km; 92 mpg_{‑US}).

Each Mopetta cost £200 (c£2000, 2017) as the most produced car by Brütsch, only 5 are known to survive. There were negotiations with Opel to distribute the car, but only sales brochures were produced.

A Brütsch Mopetta replica is available, built in the UK with a modern Honda automatic engine.

== Sources ==
- Kleinwagen, Small Cars, Petites Voitures, by Benedikt Taschen, 1994
