= Tornax =

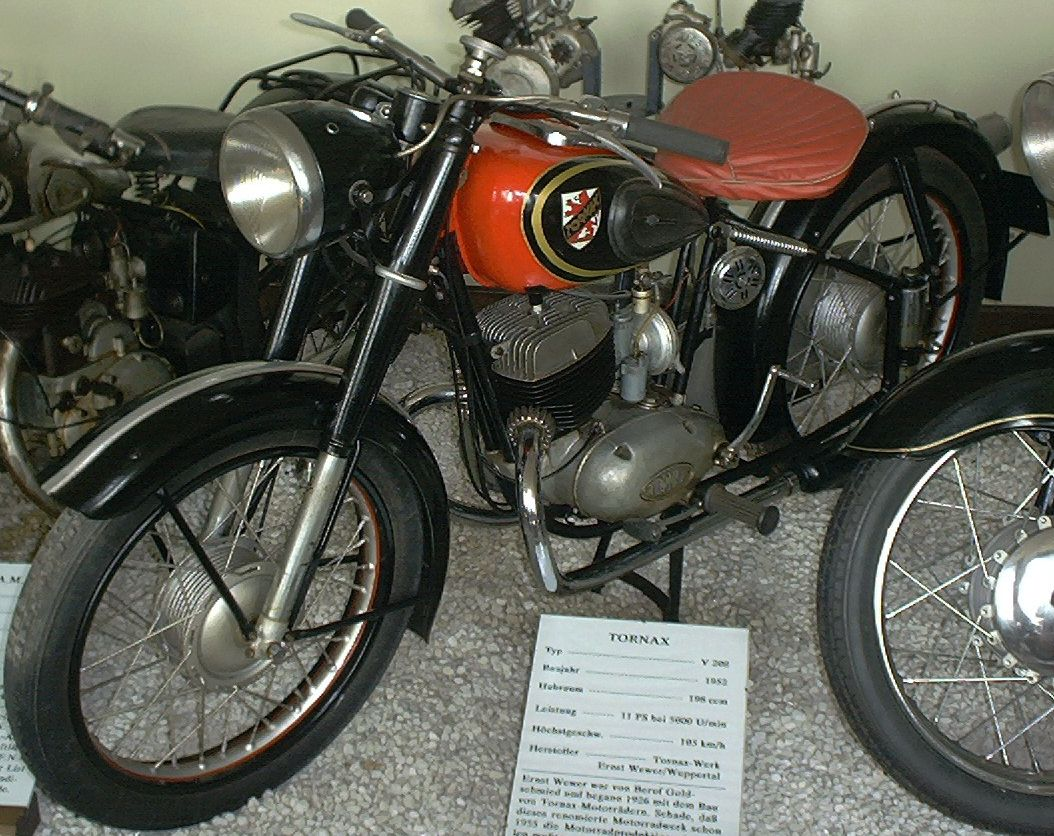
1953 Tornax V200

Tornax was a motorcycle manufacturer in Wuppertal, Germany.

Tornax built its first motorcycle in 1926. This was the model I-26, which has a 600 cc single-cylinder side-valve engine imported from JAP in London, England producing 15 bhp. For the remainder of the 1920s all Tornax models featured side-valve and overhead valve (OHV) JAP engines of 500, 550 and 600 cc, apart from the V-28 in 1928 whose 600 cc side-valve engine was supplied by the German engine manufacturer Columbus in Bad Homburg.

In 1930 Tornax produced its first twin-cylinder model, the III-30, which had a side-valve 1000 cc V-twin JAP engine producing 26 bhp (19 kW). In 1931 it added a sports version, the III-31 SS, with a 1000 cc OHV JAP engine. Tornax claimed that this machine would produce 72 bhp (54 kW), and guaranteed a top speed of 190 km/h (118 MPH). This model was very expensive, and economic conditions in the Great Depression meant that very few were sold.

For 1932 the range remained unchanged, with all the model suffixes changed from "-32" to "-33". In 1933 Tornax added smaller single-cylinder OHV models to its range: the SF 2 and SF 35, again using OHV JAP engines. The full 1933 range featured six models ranging from 200 cc to 1000 cc, with the 72 bhp (54 kW) OHV V-twin continuing as the III-33 SS.

From 1934 the National Socialist government forbade the import of foreign components. Many German motorcycle builders had been using engines, gearboxes, forks or other components from English or Swiss suppliers, and it was difficult to substitute sufficient supplies from German factories quickly enough to remain in business. Some German manufacturers ceased making motorcycles, but Tornax survived by reducing its range to one model, the aptly named Universal, with a 600 cc side-valve Columbus engine.

In 1935 Tornax added two OHV Columbus engines to its 600 cc range and introduced the 800 cc, 28 bhp (21 kW) Tornado model. The latter was a sports machine that used the same overhead camshaft Columbus parallel twin engine as the rival Horex S8. Tornax also launched a small sports car, the Rex, with a 700 cc DKW engine, but only 158 were built.

Neither the Tornado nor the Rex continued in production for 1936. Tornax reduced its 600 cc range to two models, and added its first lightweight model, the K 20, with a 200 cc two-stroke engine made by ILO. In 1937 the company added further ILO-engined two-stroke singles of 200 cc and 250 cc.

During the Second World War Tornax reduced its range to one model, the K 125 with a 125 cc ILO engine. All Tornax motorcycle production stopped in 1941, and the factory was destroyed by Allied bombing in March 1945.

In 1948 Tornax resumed K 125 production. It steadily expanded its range with larger single-cylinder two-stroke ILO engines, culminating in 1953 with a twin-cylinder model, the Z-250 Schwarze Josephine ("Black Josephine") which has a two-stroke ILO-engine producing 15 bhp (11 kW).

In 1954 Tornax built its first four-stroke models since 1939: the V 250 and SV 250. These have unit construction 250 cc engines from Opti in Essen, mounted in a frame that has swinging-arm rear suspension and typically German Earles front fork.

Tornax ceased motorcycle production in 1955. The company's total production in its 29-year existence was about 50,000 vehicles.
