= St. James's Church, Rothenburg ob der Tauber =

Medieval Church in Bavaria, Germany

Saint James Church
- St. Jakobskirche
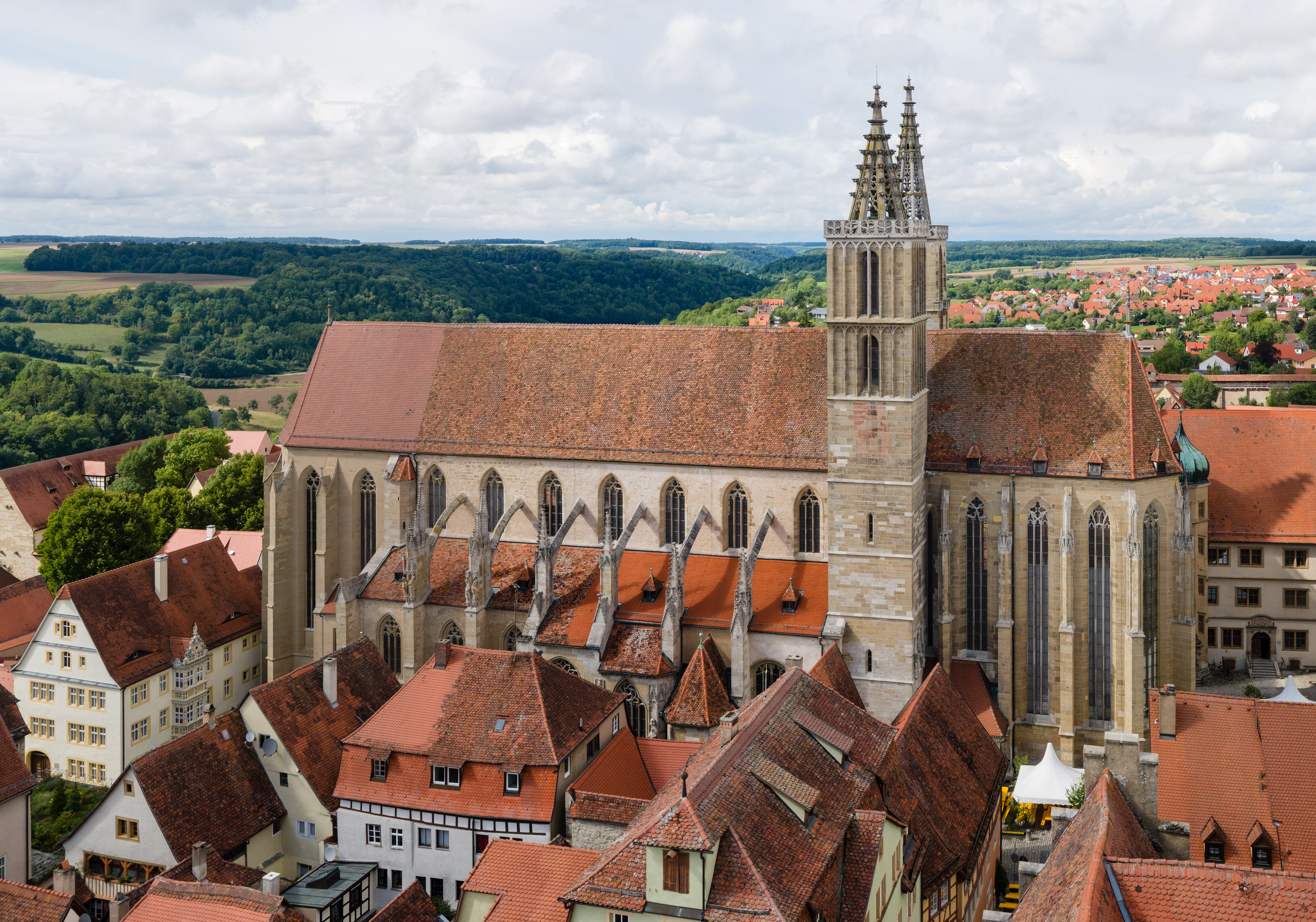
- Saint James Church
- 49°22′40″N 10°10′39″E
- Location: Rothenburg ob der Tauber, Bavaria
- Country: Germany
- Denomination: Lutheran
- Previous denomination: Roman Catholic

Architecture
- Style: Gothic
- Years built: 1311-1484

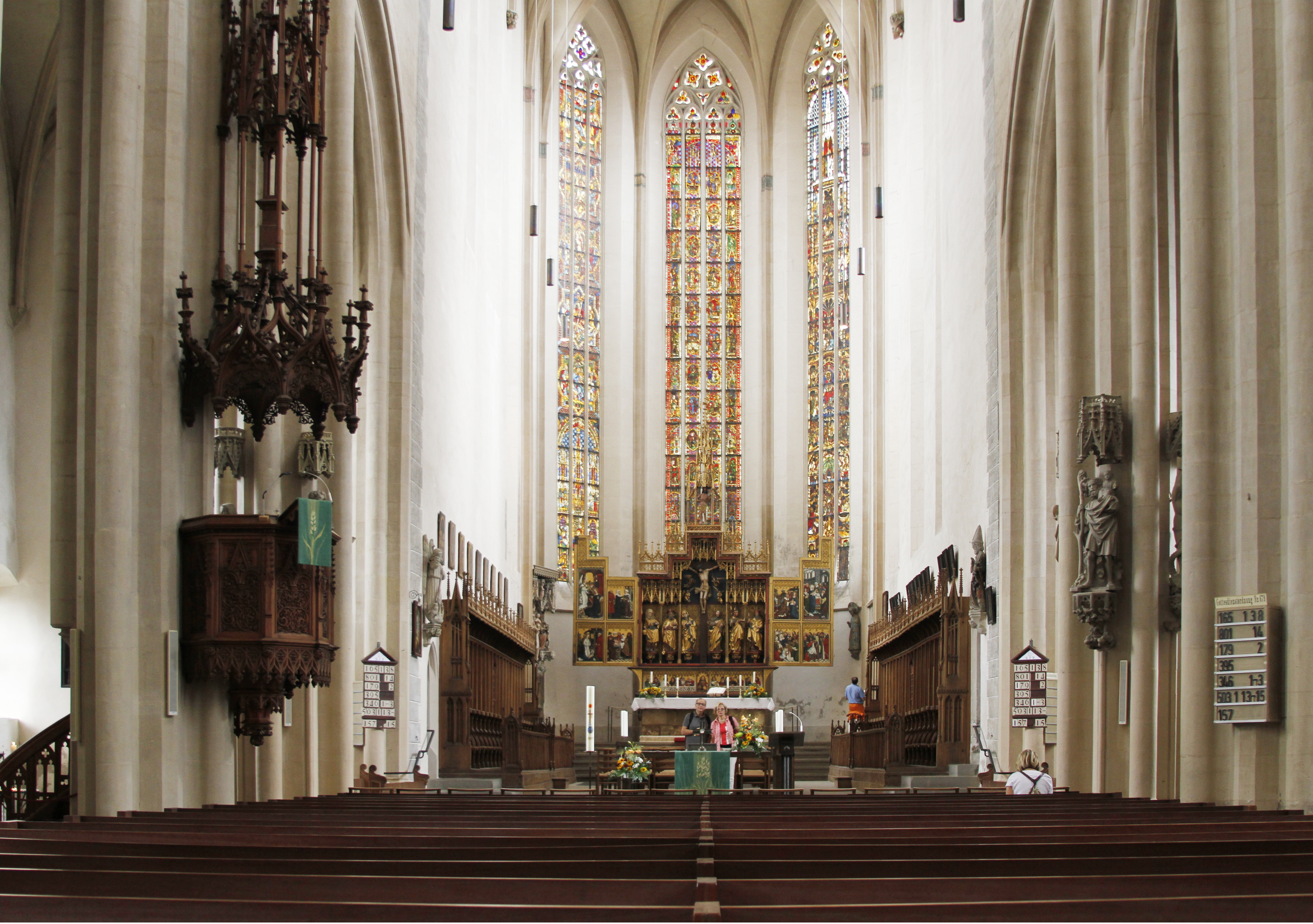
The nave

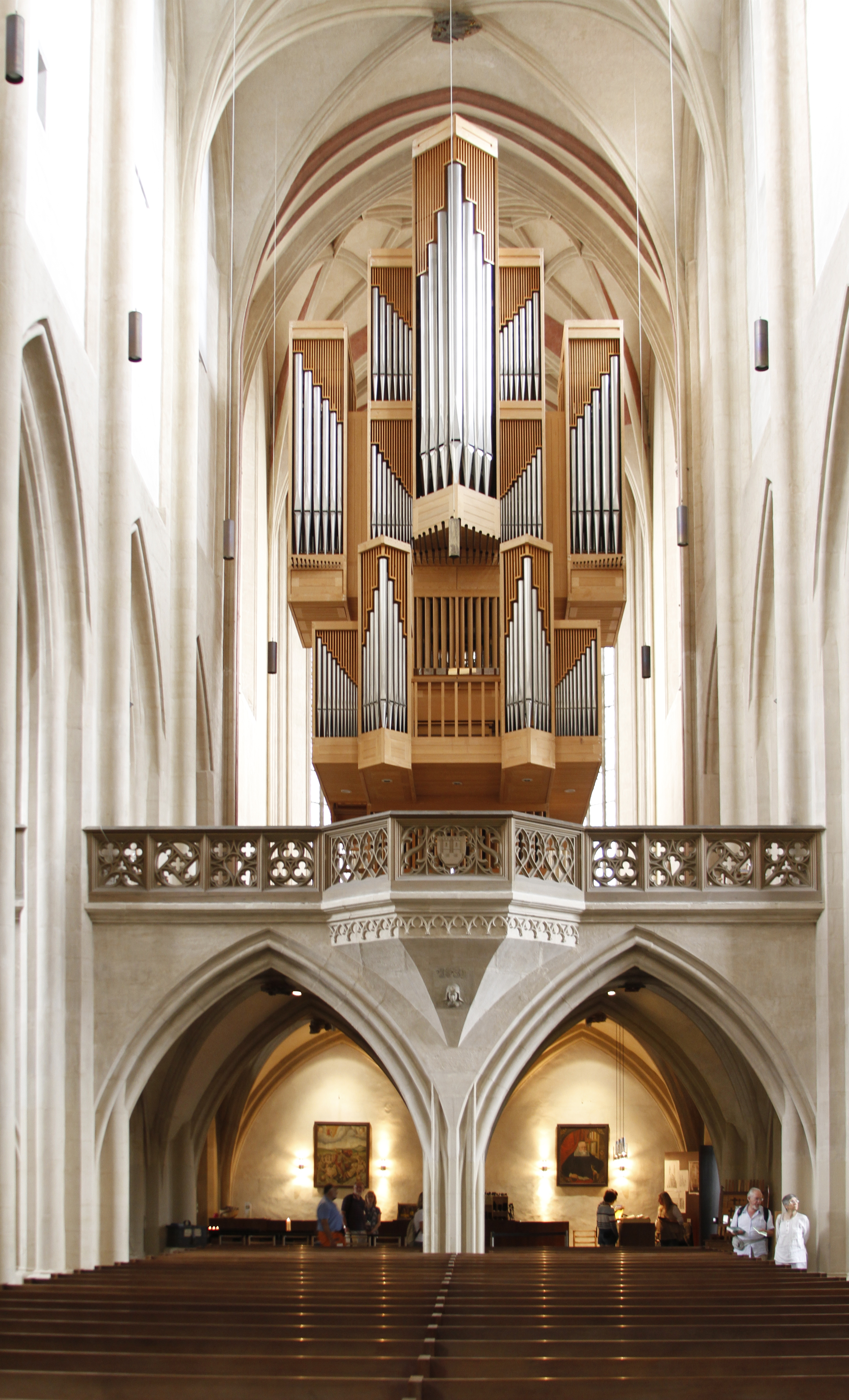
Rieger organ (1968)

St. James Church (German: St. Jakobskirche) is a Gothic church in Rothenburg ob der Tauber, Germany. It was originally a Roman Catholic church but during the 16th century became a Lutheran church. The church is on a medieval pilgrimage route to St. James Church in Santiago de Compostela, Spain. It contains the celebrated Holy Blood Altarpiece by Tilman Riemenschneider and a monumental altarpiece by Friedrich Herlin. The church has two towers (south tower: 55.2 m, 57.7 m north tower).

== History and description ==
The church was built between 1311 and 1484. Its east chancel was completed in 1322, nave built from 1373–1436, and west choir, which bridges the street, from 1453–1471. The church was consecrated in 1485 by the Bishop of Würzburg as a Roman Catholic church and was dedicated to St James the Greater. In 1525 the peasant leader Florian Geyer read aloud the articles of the revolting peasants from its west chancel.

Its western gallery contains the famous Holy Blood altarpiece of the Würzburg wood carver Tilman Riemenschneider, created circa 1500–1505, which includes a rock crystal reliquary cross (c. 1270). The altar includes scenes of the entry into Jerusalem (right wing), Lord's Supper (shrine) with Judas as central figure and the Mount of Olives (left wing).

Other important relics include the High Altar (1466 by Friedrich Herlin a pupil of Rogier van der Weyden; also known as the Twelve Apostles Altar) in the east choir, which represents on its back side the oldest depiction of the city of Rothenburg and rare images of the Jakobs pilgrim legend, as well as an altar by Tilman Riemenschneider and Mary Coronation altar with sculptures from different centuries, including the Riemenschneider school. The stained glass windows of the east chancel are adorned with valuable images from 1350-1400 AD, including the left window (about 1400) with scenes of the life of the Virgin Mary, central window (circa 1350) with scenes from Christ's life and passion, and right window (about 1400) representing Christ's work of redemption and sacraments.

== Great Organ ==
The great organ in St. Jakob was built by Rieger Orgelbau (Vorarlberg, Austria) in 1968, with 69 stops (108 ranks, c. 5,500 pipes), Tracker action and electric action for the stops. It can be played from the main console (4 manuals and pedal) and from a two-manual console on the back. The specification:

I Rückpositiv C–g^{3}
Principal	8'
Rohrflöte	8'
Oktav	4'
Koppelflöte	4'
Gemshorn	2'
Quintlein	1^{1}/_{3}′
Scharf IV	1'
Sesquialter II	2^{2}/_{3}′
Bärpfeife	16'
Krummhorn	8'
Tremulant

II Hauptwerk C–g^{3}
Principal	16'
Oktave	8'
Spitzflöte	8'
Oktav	4'
Hohlflöte	4'
Quinte	2^{2}/_{3}′
Superoktav	2'
Mixtur VI	1^{1}/_{3}′
Cimbel IV	^{2}/_{3}′
Cornett V (from tenor g)	8'
Trompete	16'
Trompete	8'
Chamade	8'
Clairon	4'
Glockenspiel
Zimbelstern

III Schwellwerk (enclosed) C–g^{3}
Pommer	16'
Principal	8'
Bleigedackt	8'
Salicional	8'
Schwebung	8'
Oktav	4'
Rohrflöte	4'
Nasat	2^{2}/_{3}′
Blockflöte	2'
Terz	1^{3}/_{5}′
Plein jeu V	2'
Buntcimbel IV	^{1}/_{3}′
Fagott	16'
Trompete	8'
Oboe	8'
Schalmei	4'
Tremulant

IV Brustwerk (enclosed) C–g^{3}
Holzgedackt	8'
Quintade	8'
Spitzgedackt	4'
Spitzgambe	4'
Principal	2'
Sifflet	1'
Cimbel II	^{1}/_{4}′
Glechter IV	1^{3}/_{5}′
Vox humana	8'
Musette	4'
Tremulant

Pedalwerk I C–f^{1}
Untersatz	32'
Principal	16'
Subbass	16'
Oktav	8'
Spillpfeife	8'
Flötoktav	4'
Nachthorn	2'
Mixtur VI	2^{2}/_{3}′
Rauschbass IV	5^{1}/_{3}′
Basszink IV	5^{1}/_{3}′
Bombarde	16'
Sordun	16'
Posaune	8'
Zink	4'

Pedalwerk II C–f^{1}
Holzbass	16'
Flötbass	8'
Choralbass II	4'+1^{1}/_{3}′
Pommer	2'
Dulzian	16'

== Gallery ==
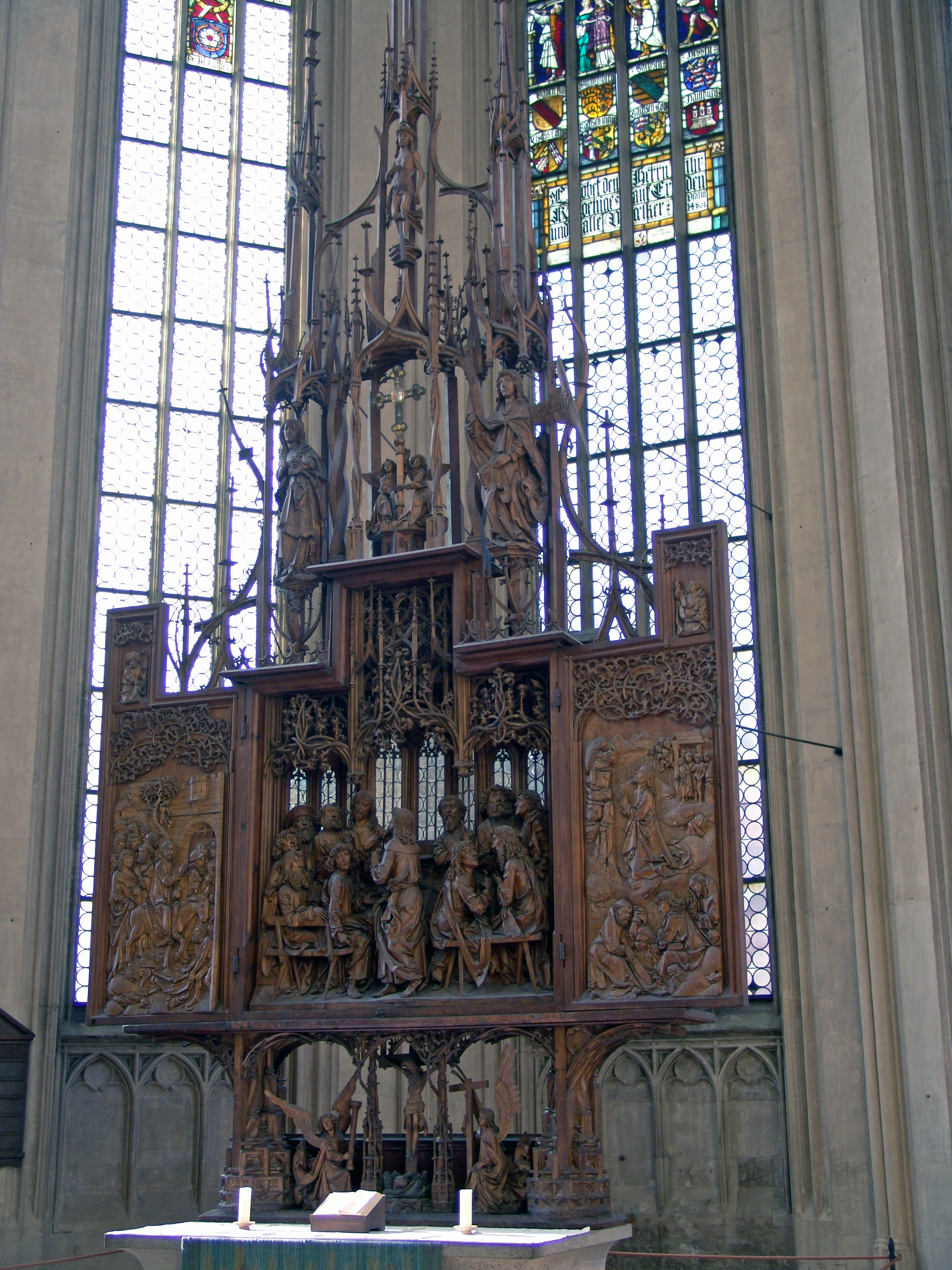
Holy Blood altarpiece

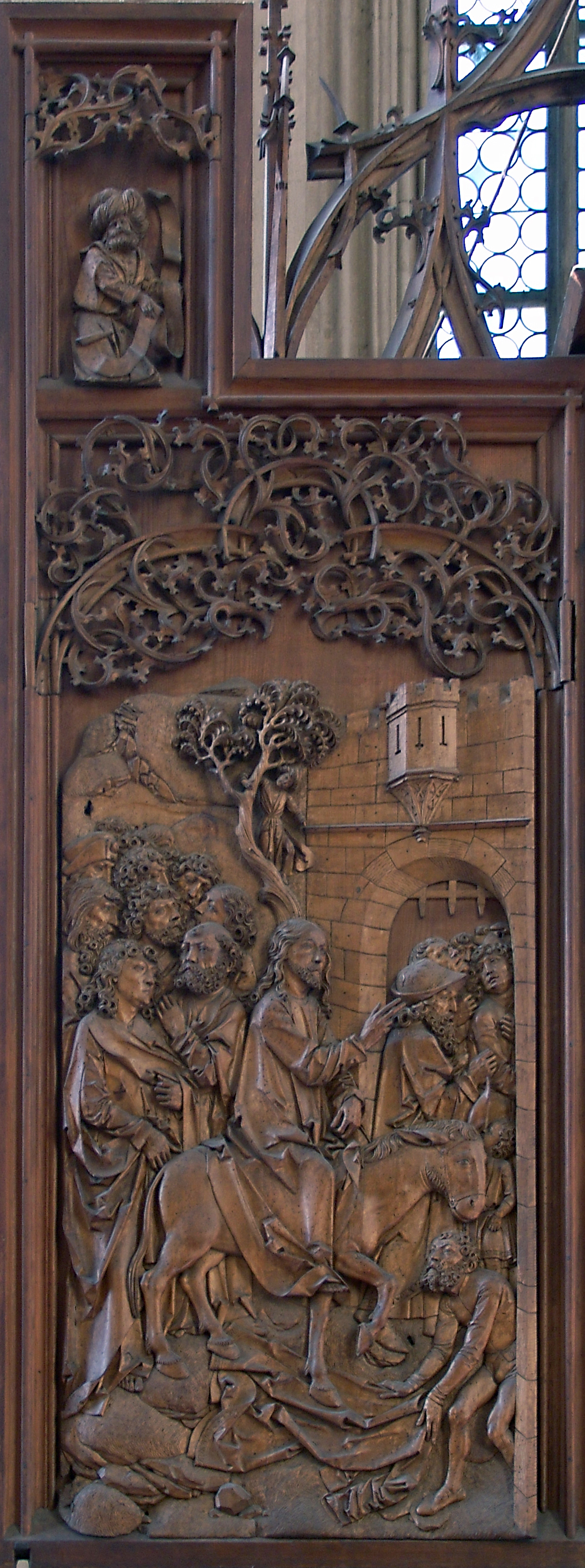
Holy Blood altarpiece Detail: Entrance of Christ into Jerusalem

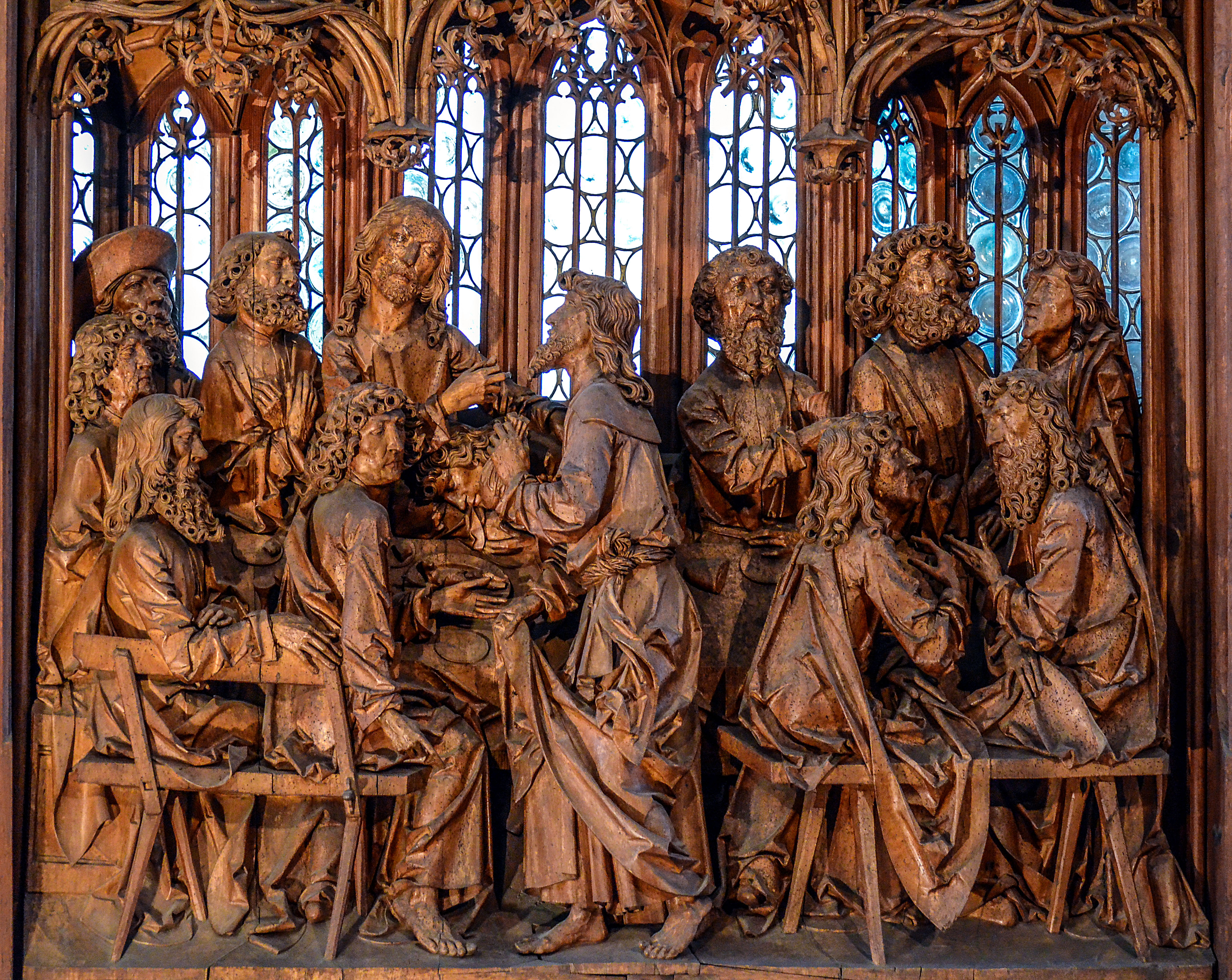
Holy Blood altarpiece Detail: Last Supper

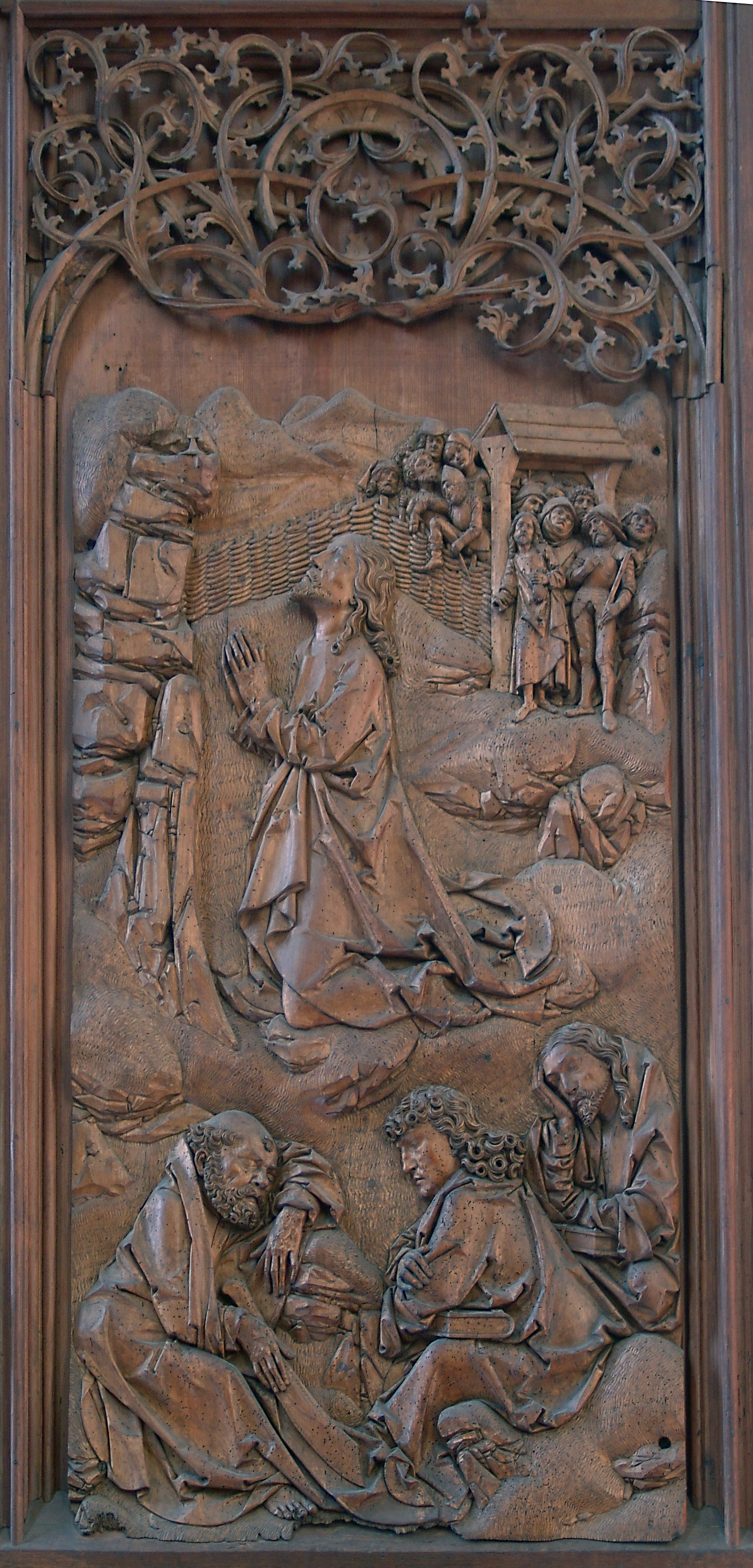
Holy Blood altarpiece

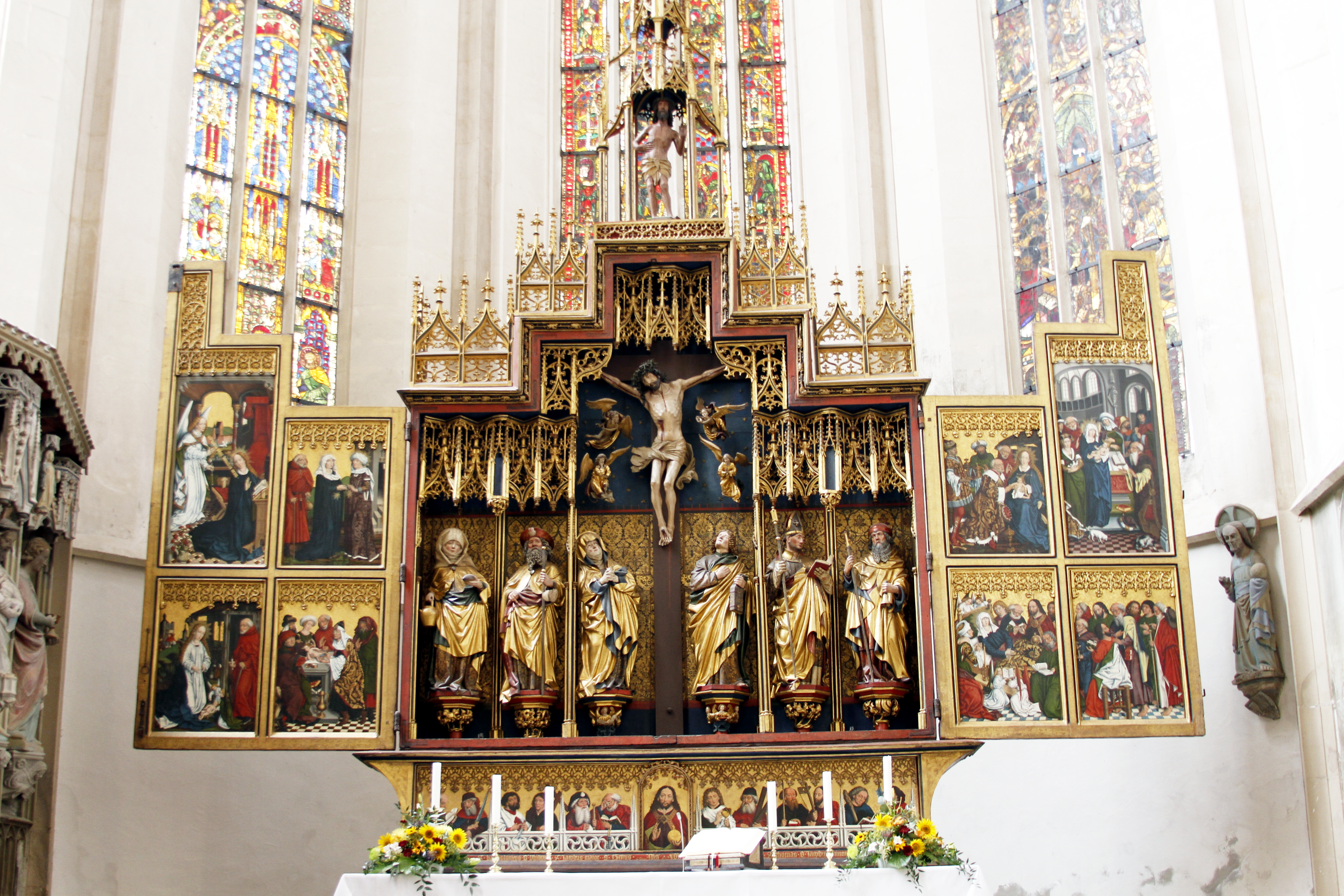
Twelve Apostles Altar
