= Zweirad Union =

Zweirad Union AG
- Founded: 1957
- Defunct: 1963
- Fate: Merged
- Headquarters: Nuremberg, Germany
- Products: motorcycles

Zweirad Union AG was a German conglomerate formed by the merger of motorcycle manufacturers Victoria and Express Werke, and the motorcycle division of DKW. In 1958, Zweirad Union was one of three manufacturers responsible for 75% of motorized bicycle (motorcycles, mopeds and scooters) in Germany, along with Zundapp and NSU. It was purchased by Fichtel & Sachs in 1963 who them merged it with their other purchase, the motorcycle company Hercules.
