= Sachs MadAss =

MadAss
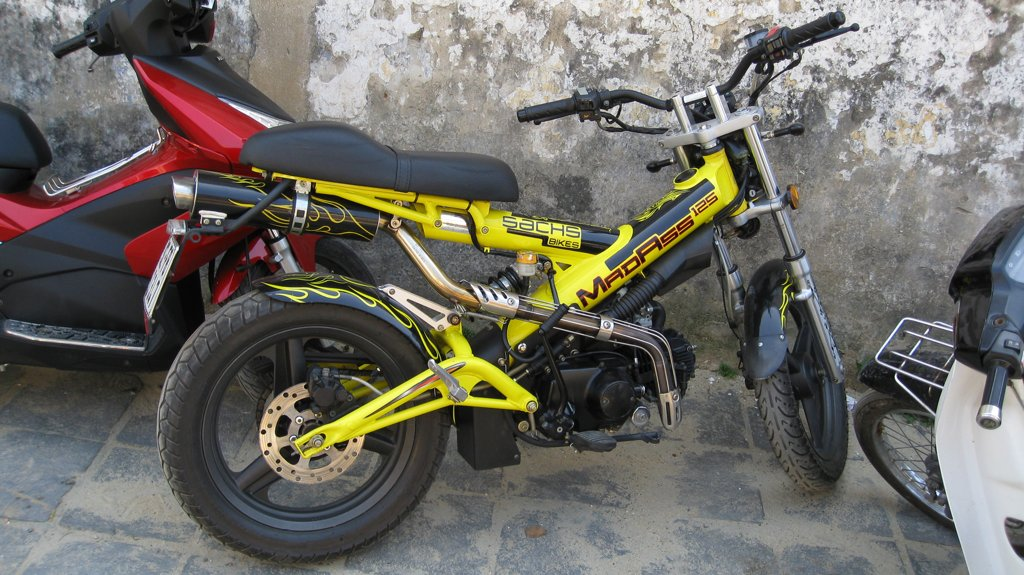
- Manufacturer: Sachs
- Production: 2004 - present
- Class: Underbone / Naked bike
- Engine: 49 cc, 124 cc or 160 cc
- Top speed: 125: approx 90 km/h (56 mph). 50: 37 mph (60 km/h)
- Power: 6.0 KW(8hp)/8400 RPM (125cc)
- Torque: 8.0 Nm(6lb-ft)/5400 RPM (125cc)
- Ignition type: DC-CDI
- Transmission: Automatic (centrifugal clutch) or 4-speed manual on either 50cc, 125cc or 160cc
- Suspension: Telescopic Fork (Front), Directly linked shock strut With monoshock (Rear)
- Brakes: Single disc (260 Front, 215 Rear)
- Tires: 90/90-16 (Front), 120/80-16 (Rear)(2004-2006)/90/80-16 (Front), 120/70-16 (Rear)(2007-present)
- Wheelbase: 1,235 mm (48.62 Inches)
- Dimensions: L: 1,840 mm (72.44 Inches); W: 760 mm (29.92 Inches; H: 1,035 mm (40.74 Inches)
- Seat height: 835 mm (32.87 Inches)
- Weight: 100 kg (220.46 lbs) (dry); 104.5 kg (230.4 lbs) (wet)
- Fuel capacity: 5.1 liters 1.2 US gal or 4.5 L or 1.00 imp gal (50 cc); 1.32 US gal or 5.0 L or 1.10 imp gal (125 cc)
- Oil capacity: 0.9 litres (0.95 US qt)
- Fuel consumption: 85-plus MPG

The Sachs MadAss is an underbone motorcycle available in a 49 cc (3.0 cu in), 125 cc (7.6 cu in) or 160 cc (9.8 cu in) assembled in Malaysia and manufactured in China and distributed by German automotive company Sachs Motorcycles since 2004. The engine is based on the popular horizontal one cylinder originally used in Honda mopeds and small motorcycles from the late 1960s.

It incorporates the fuel tank into the frame and has no external bodywork or fairings. It has a stainless steel under-seat exhaust, a four-speed manual gearbox or automatic transmission and dual hydraulic disc brake. The front headlights are positioned vertically. In the US, the 49 cc model is limited to 40 mph (64 km/h) to qualify as a moped in some jurisdictions.

The MadAss has been sold in the US as the Xkeleton Trickster, and under the Pierspeed and Tomberlin brands as the MadAss. In Canada, it was also sold as the AMG Nitro.

As of December 2014, the Madass 50 is once again available in the US in 49cc form, via a new distributor, Excalibur Motorsports of Chino, California. It is CARB certified for sale and use in the state of California.
