= Express Werke =

Manufactured bicycles and motorcycles

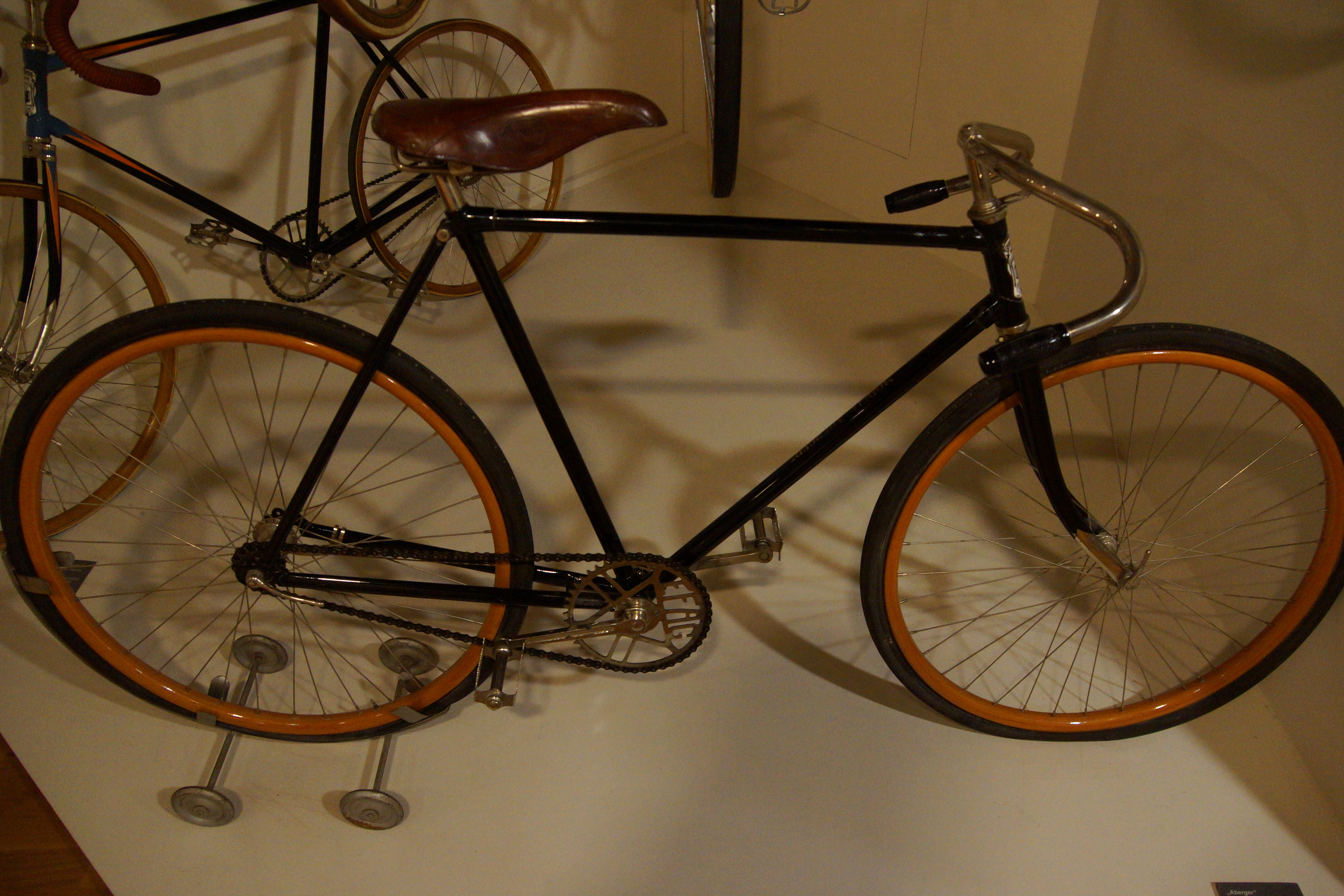
Express Bicycles

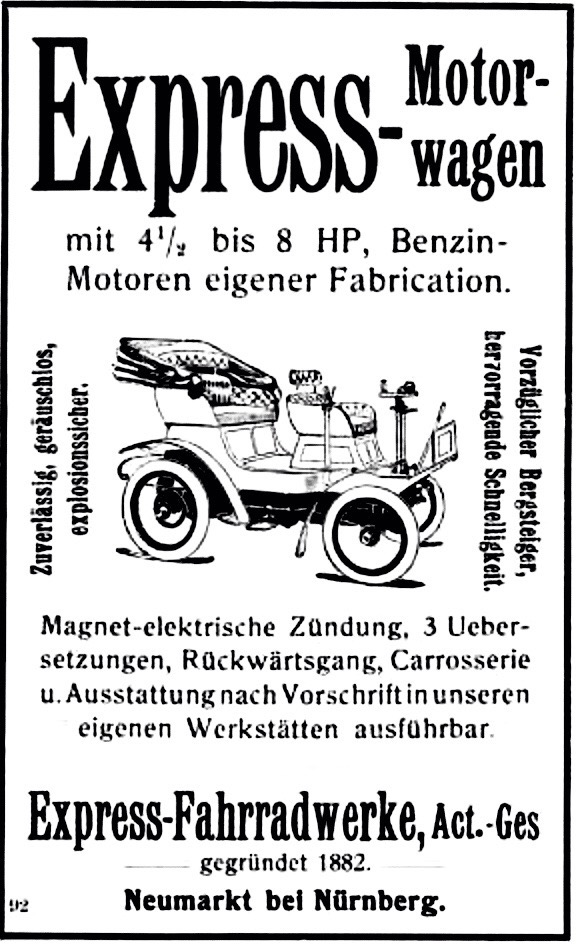
Express advertisement (1901)

Express Werke AG was a company formed in 1884 in Neumarkt in der Oberpfalz, Germany that manufactured bicycles and motorcycles. At the start of the company they produced 20 bikes with 16 employees in one year. In the 1930s Express built mopeds and lightweight motorcycles with 75cc and 98cc Sachs engines. From 1949 the company resumed production using Sachs and ILO engines up to 248cc. In 1958 Express merged with DKW and Victoria to form Zweirad Union. Zweirad Union terminated Express production in 1959.
