= ILO-Motorenwerke =

German two-stroke motor company

Company logo in the 1950s

The ILO-Motorenwerke GmbH 2-stroke motor company in Pinneberg, Germany existed from 1911 to 1990 and was one of the biggest manufacturers of two-stroke engines in Germany. The term ‘ILO’ comes from the constructed language Esperanto and means "tool". In 1959 it was sold to Rockwell Manufacturing Company.

1911 to 1930s. The company was founded in Hamburg in 1911. The founder Heinrich Christiansen bought a bankrupt machine factory, with 25 employees producing a track tamper-compactor for Prussian railway construction. Around 1918 the first two-stroke engine was developed to motorize the tamper. The plant expanded across from the railway system in nearby Pinneberg. The tamper machine was sold to Krupp in 1922 to concentrate on motors for motorcycles and small trucks. 1927 a bicycle auxiliary motor was developed and, in 1929 two-stroke ILO engines for agriculture tillers and pumps. In 1930s engines for three-wheel delivery vans were a big hit.

1940–59. During World War II exclusively engines were manufactured – no war damage occurred. Engine construction was not allowed until 1947 but engines of the British Army on the Rhine were repaired and orders came from occupying forces. Many motorcycle manufacturers opted for ILO. In 1954, 1,500 people produced 184,000 units - making ILO the largest manufacturer of two-stroke engines in Germany. In 1957 Moped used ILO piano engines. Many motorcycle firms faced bankruptcy in 1959, forcing ILO to lay off 600 employees. Heinrich Christiansen's son, who took over from his father, negotiated the sale of the business to Rockwell Manufacturing Company that same year. Rockwell wasn't really interested in the motor business, they only wanted the facilities and trained workforce to serve as a European-based valve manufacturer for Rockwell's U.S. Valve Division. This planned use never occurred. In 1960, before Rockwell could redirect their efforts, small motor demand exploded with their entry in the fast-growing North American snowmobile business. This proved disastrous, not just because Rockwell's business model did not include 2-stroke motors, but because ILO was ill-prepared, technically and historically, to produce high performance motors as required by the market.

In 1968 Michael W. Hodges joined Pittsburg-based Rockwell Manufacturing Company as Corporate Director of Quality Assurance and later as Corporate Director of Manufacturing. Prior to Rockwell, Hodges was a physicist with NASA, and an aerospace reliability and quality manager with Martin-Marietta in Orlando, Fl. During Hodges’ 7 years with Rockwell, there were approximately 90,000 employees in 7 divisions: the Valve Division who produced products for the oil and gas industry at their plants in Barberton, OH, Raleigh, NC, Sulfur Springs, TX, and Kearney, NE; the Gas Products Division who produced meters and regulators in Dubois, PA; the Municipal Water Meter Division in Uniontown, PA; the Power Tool Division in Syracuse, NY, Jackson, TN, Tupelo, MS, Bellefontaine, OH and Columbia, SC; the Transportation Division with a large steel foundry producing products for the automotive, railway and rapid-transit industry at their foundry in Atchison, KS; the Sterling Faucet Division in Reedsville, WV; and the Engine Division in Pinneberg, Germany (ILO-Motorenwerke GmbH) and Russellville KY, manufacturing 2-cycle gas-driven industrial motors for tillers, water pumps, sprayers, cement mixers, tampers for sale to developing nations as well as motors for mopeds, snowmobile, and all-terrain vehicles for the North American market.

During 1968–69, all Rockwell division were required to assure quality control, and restructured so that the quality manager of each facility reported to the same level as did engineering and manufacturing. Each facility's quality was graded by the level and trend of its quality cost impact on earnings, revealing significant quality and reliability issues especially with Gas Product Division meter leaks – and, of large escalating warranty claims on US books and enterprise image issues regarding snowmobile motor sales into rapidly growing US and Canadian snowmobile markets, with motors manufactured by the Engine Division's ILO-Motorenwerke factory in Pinneberg, Germany – which repeatedly did not correct. The snowmobile motor business was entered in early 1960s, first with alterations traditional low rpm industrial motors but increasingly requiring higher performance at much higher rpm that overwhelmed ILO's engineering and quality control competence. Meanwhile, established world-dominant engine firms from Japan, such as Yamaha, with proven motor cycle and marine engine experience surged into the snowmobile market with higher and higher performance and good quality products, at lower prices.

Escalating losses and accelerating debt was accumulating in the motor business on both sides of the ocean, as well as the Dikkers Valve Netherland firm also going into the red. Such impacts to Rockwell Manufacturing Company consolidated earnings complicated major negotiations in process for Rockwell's expansion in the aerospace business as well as hindering a sale of the German factory. Losses were further amplified by appreciation of both the German Deutsche Mark and Dutch currencies vs. the U.S. dollar. Simply closing the German plant would entail heavy termination costs and time consumption.

In 1970, Rockwell Manufacturing Company management appointed Michael W. Hodges as CEO of the unprofitable Engine Division and as ‘Geschäftsführer’ (managing director) of the German-based ILO-Motorenwerke GMBH manufacturing company, including appointed to the European boards of Rockwell GMBH Germany and Dikkers Valve Products LLC Netherlands. At the time thousands of snowmobile motors were stuck on docks in Baltimore and Montreal, having been refused by intended customers. Many failed delivered motors were being rotated into a rework facility set up in Russellville, Kentucky, as warranty costs soared. Three German banks demanded and Mr. Hodges refused to provide parent company guarantees for accelerating debt.

After Mr. Hodges' arrived at the Engine Division's ILO-Motorenwerke factory in Pinneberg, Germany a first priority was to recognize that thousands of dedicated long-serving German employees had jobs at risk and large time-consuming termination costs. The national union in Frankfurt ordered that only foreign workers may be terminated, not German workers. Instead of closing down the troubled engine business as ordered by headquarters, decided instead try to find a way to reverse rising losses and debt - to prolong the core traditional business and buy time for more options. Major restructuring changes included replacing the top 2 tiers of management, promoting from within directors of Marketing (Herr Ernst Kroger), Manufacturing (Herr Dieter Bachmann) and Finance (Herr Karl Engelhardt) - and from outside new management for engineering (Herr Jurgen Fischer) and quality control (Herr Hankel). Attacking quality issues internally and with major suppliers, and reducing snowmobile production, including significant downsizing of the labor force via the personnel manager gaining local in-plant union leader to assist setting up a jobs fair such that every departing worker found a new job without pay loss, with minimal termination cost – such cancelled a threatened central union lawsuit. A large nearby rented warehouse had been stuffed full with unusable motors and parts, at inflated book prices. Also able to could close the Russellville, Kentucky rework facility. ILO's life was extended with rising profit and free of all debt to better facilitate future sale.

Regarding ILO's historic conventional industrial motor business with motors to German and other international customers for agriculture and construction applications, those markets were already declining due to bankruptcy of many German end product customers due to the D-Mark appreciation but primarily because most applications were being phased-out by end users such as in Italy and Greece – such as, back pack sprayers replaced by airplane spraying, motor tillers by tractors, portable cement mixers by cement trucks, road construction tampers by roller vehicles, moped bikes by high performance motor cycles. Additionally, not only was the German D-Mark currency the strongest in Europe but its relative cost was increasing. The search for different products for manufacturing facilities was unsuccessful, including via Volkswagen, the 6 industrial product divisions of Rockwell, Ford and others. Moto Guzzi-Italy instead of wanting to buy wanted to sell its operation to Rockwell - American Tecumseh Products Company showed some interest with its many small motor applications but was uninterested because of ILO's dire financial status. Following a 3-year turn-around of the German Engine Division and its German-based ILO Werke, and additionally the Dikkers Valve Product Company in Hengelo, Netherlands, in 1974 Michael Hodges was offered promotion to CEO of both the Engine Division and the Transportation Products Division - which he declined to accept because Rockwell was no longer continuing with an industrial product future – instead implementing a new business model of government-centered aerospace products, an industry from which Mr. Hodges resigned in 1968 to pursue a medium-sized private sector-oriented industrial products company with international exposure – he resigned to pursue an outside opportunity.

Rockwell Manufacturing Company completed a merger in 1973 with North American Rockwell to create Rockwell International. The German motor manufacturing facilities were sold to American Tecumseh Products Company in 1977. The original Rockwell founder was Willard Rockwell (1888-1978) started his first business by purchasing a small bankrupt firm in 1919. The German ILO-Motorenwerke GmbH business survived another 16 years, until 1990.

== Engines ==
The appended "V" stands for Ventilation, i.e. an additional cooling blower.

| engine | use |
|---|---|
| ILO F48 | motorized bicycles |
| ILO MG125 | some Radex motorcycles |
| ILO L100, L125, L150, L200, L201, L250, L320 and L375 | Used in agriculture equipment (tillers, mowers, pumps,... Some engines are available in a horizontal arrangement (e.g. L152L) |
| ILO MG150V | |
| ILO MG175 | |
| ILO M200V | universal engine, used in e.g. Hoffmann MR200, Tornax V200, Fuldamobil, Glas Goggo-Roller 200, Röhr Rolletta, etc. |
| ILO V200 | |
| ILO Twin 250 | used in e.g. AWD, Buydens, Bücker, Austria-Alpha, Sparta B.V. motorcycles |

== See also ==
- Brütsch Mopetta
- Mars (motorcycle)

== Gallery ==
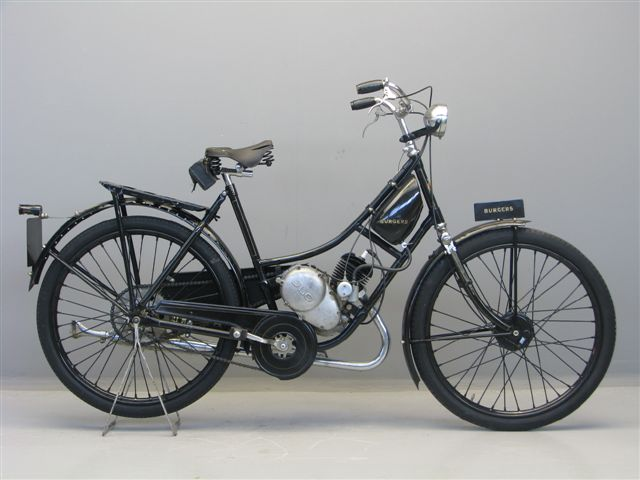
Burgers 100 cc ladies motorcycle with ILO engine from 1934

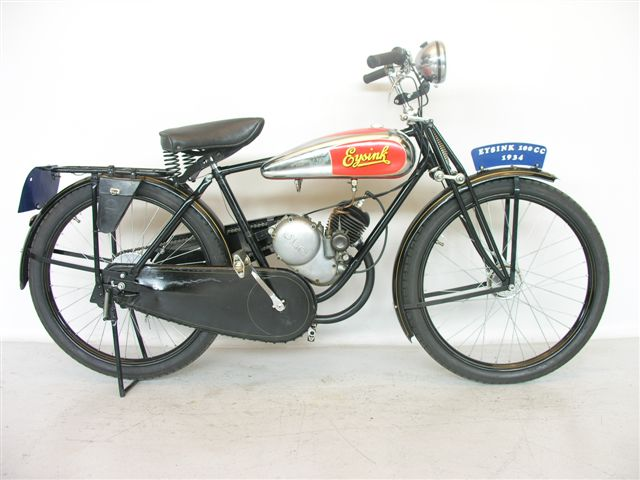
Eysink motorcycle with ILO engine from 1934

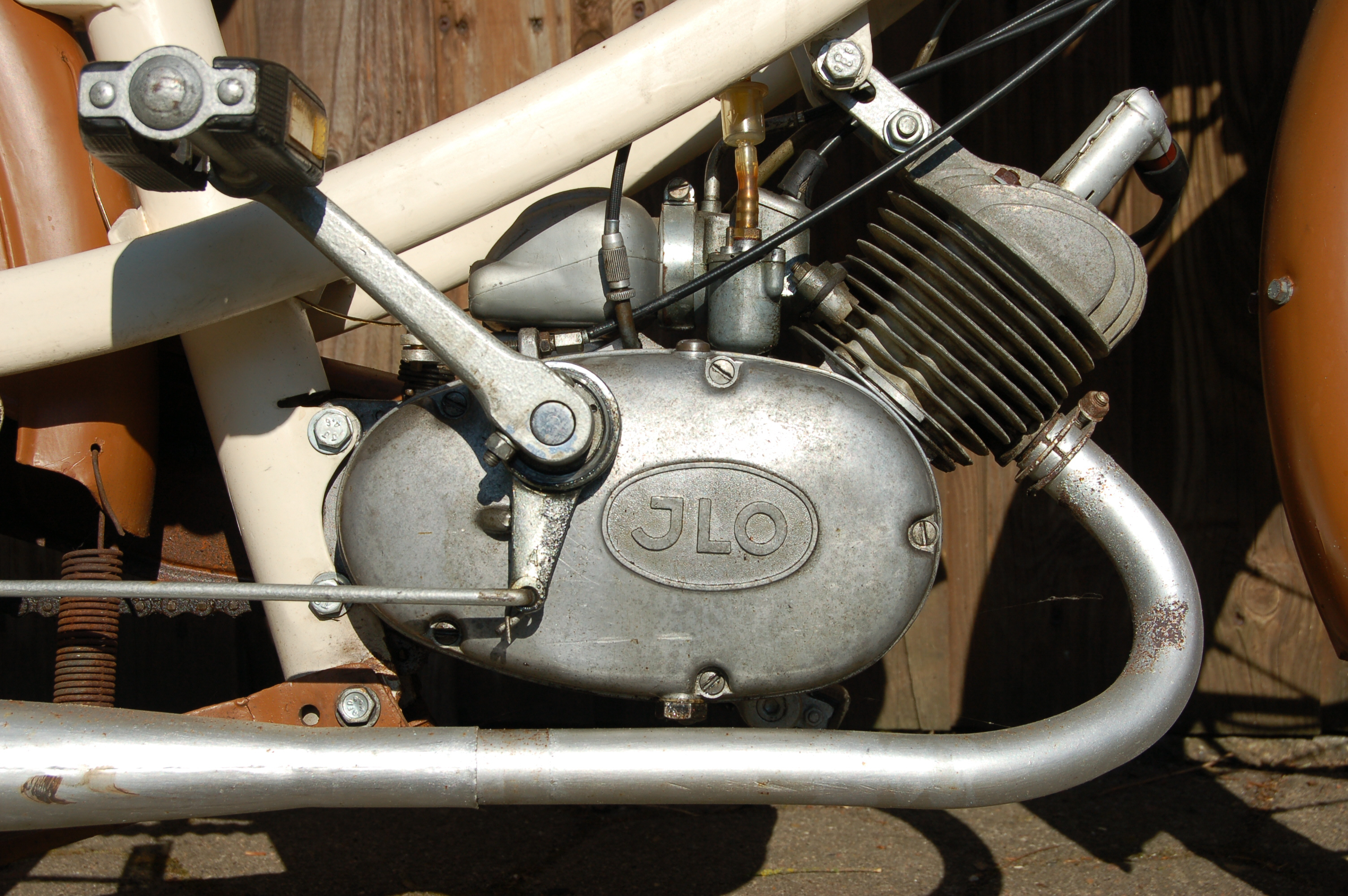
ILO Piano engine, 49 ccm 1.25 hp, 1958

== See also ==
- Rockwell International
