= Katzwang =

District of Nuremberg

Coordinates: 49°21′N 11°03′E

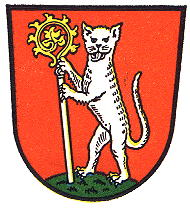
Coat of arms

Katzwang, formerly a separate municipality, has been a part of Nuremberg in Bavaria, Germany, since 1 July 1972. It is located on a ford across the Rednitz river, in the south of the city (approx. 8 km away from the center).

The village was mentioned for the first time in the year 1152. It belonged at that point to Ellwangen Abbey, which sold it to Ebrach Abbey in 1296.

The church of Saint Mary still contains medieval work, in particular the ossuary (German: "Karner") and the walls of the churchyard.

The Rhine-Main-Danube canal, a navigable waterway linking the Main and Danube rivers, passes to the north of Katzwang. On 26 March 1979, while still under construction, the canal burst its banks close to Katzwang and flooded the village, killing a 12-year-old girl and causing widespread property damage.
