= Messerschmitt KR200 =

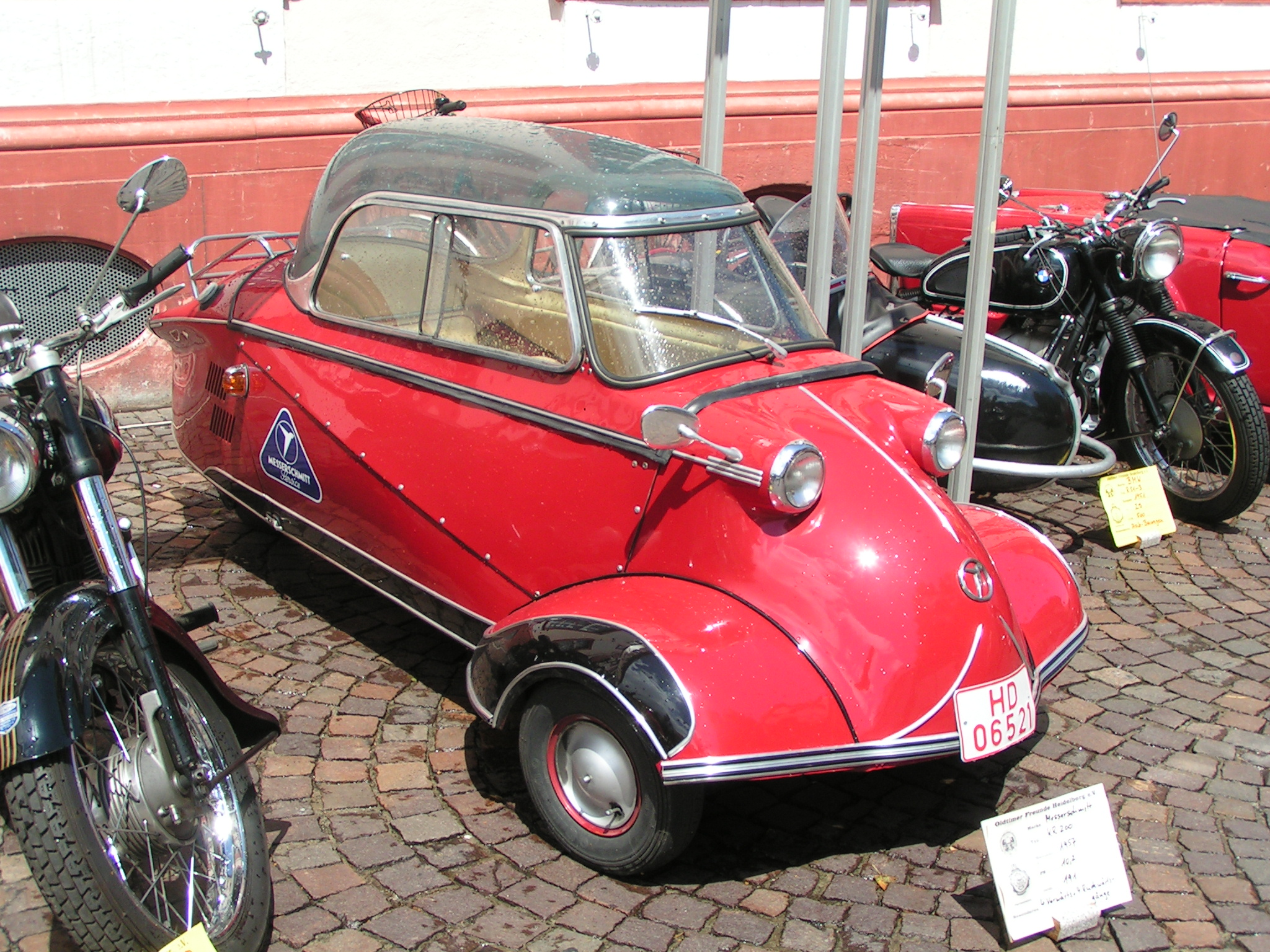

Overview
- Manufacturer: Messerschmitt
- Also called: Kabinenroller, Karo
- Production: 1955–1964; approximately 41,190 built
- Assembly: Germany: Regensburg
- Designer: Fritz Fend

Body and chassis
- Class: Microcar
- Body style: 1-door coupé 1-door convertible 1-door roadster
- Layout: Rear mid-engine, rear-wheel-drive
- Platform: Messerschmitt Kabinenroller
- Doors: Canopy
- Related: Messerschmitt KR175; Messerschmitt KR201 (roadster); FMR Tg500

Powertrain
- Engine: 191 cc Fichtel & Sachs two-stroke single cylinder, operable in both directions of crankshaft rotation
- Power output: 9.7 bhp (7.2 kW)
- Transmission: Four speeds forward or reverse (depending on engine rotation), sequential, unsynchronized.

Dimensions
- Wheelbase: 202.9 cm (79.9 in)
- Length: 281.9 cm (111.0 in)
- Width: 121.9 cm (48.0 in)
- Height: 119.9 cm (47.2 in)
- Curb weight: 230 kg (507 lb) (curb)

Chronology
- Predecessor: Messerschmitt KR175

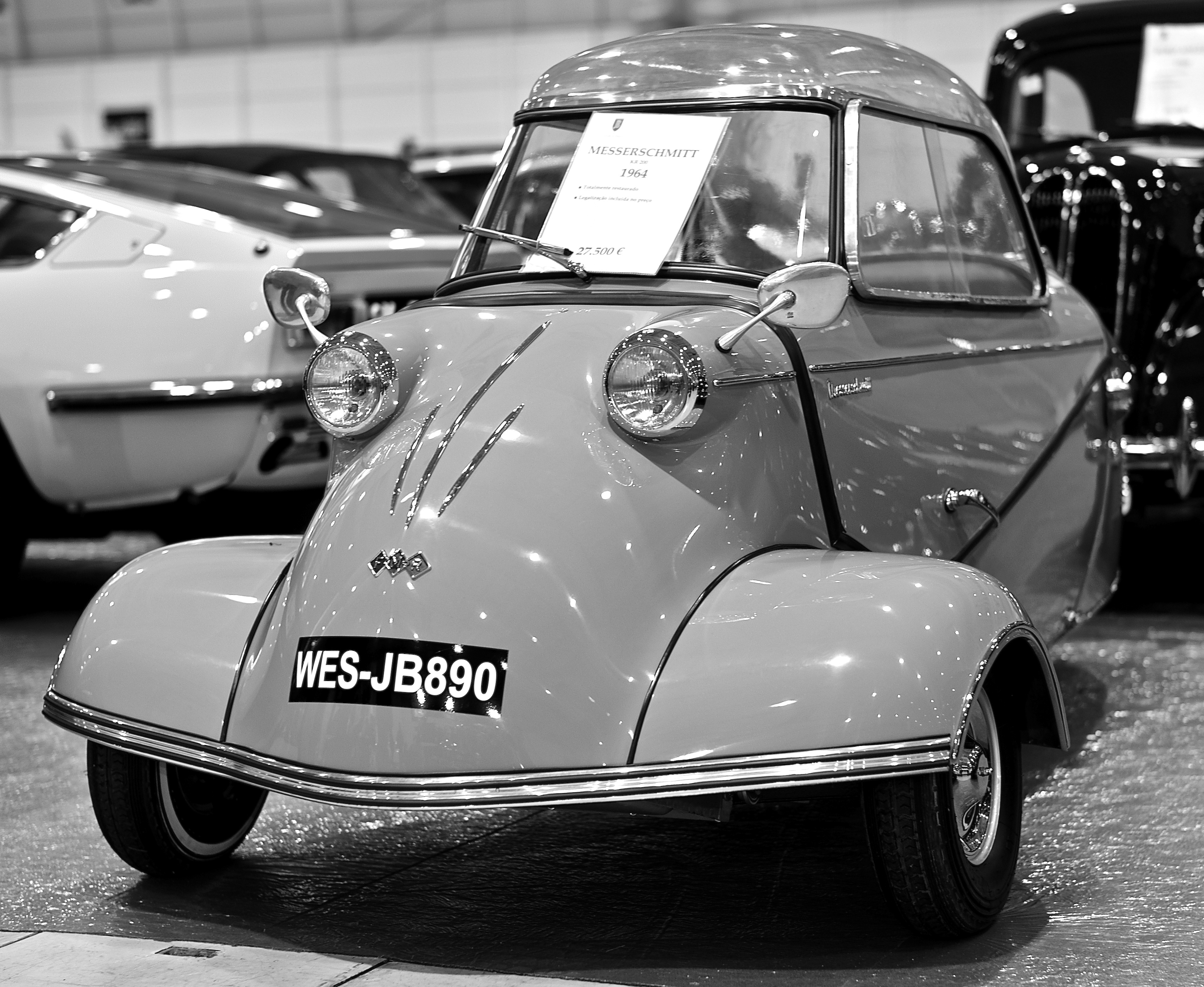
KR200 photographed in 2013 in Lisbon, Portugal

The Messerschmitt KR200, or Kabinenroller (Cabin Scooter), is a three-wheeled bubble car designed by the aircraft engineer Fritz Fend and produced in the factory of the West German aircraft manufacturer Messerschmitt from 1955 until 1964.

== History ==
Messerschmitt, temporarily not allowed to manufacture aircraft, had turned its resources to making other products. In 1952, Fend approached Messerschmitt with the idea of manufacturing small motor vehicles. These were based on his Fend Flitzer invalid carriage.

The first of Fend's vehicles to enter production at Messerschmitt's Regensburg factory was the KR175. The title Kabinenroller means "scooter with cabin". While the Messerschmitt name and insignia were used on the car, a separate company, incorporated as Regensburger Stahl- und Metallbau GmbH, was created to manufacture and market the vehicle.

The KR200 replaced the KR175 in 1955. While using the same basic frame as the KR175, the KR200 was otherwise an almost total redesign, with changes to the bodywork (notably including wheel cutouts in the front fenders), and an improved canopy design, while the rear suspension and engine mounting were reworked, and hydraulic shock absorbers were installed at all three wheels. Tire sizes were enlarged to 4.00×8.

Retailing for around DM 2,500, the KR200 was considered an instant success with almost 12,000 built during its first year, which was the highest annual production for Kabinenroller models. A maximum speed in excess of 90 km/h (56 mph) despite a claimed power output of only 10 PS (7.4 kW; 9.9 hp), 1 more PS than the 175 cc engine from the KR175, reflected the vehicle's light weight and low aerodynamic drag. The KR200, however, was 23 kg heavier than the KR175 it replaced but had a 10 km/h (6 mph) higher top speed. An "Export" package included a two-tone paint scheme, painted hubcaps, a fully trimmed interior, a heater, a clock, and a sunshade for the canopy.

In 1956, around a year after West Germany joined NATO, Messerschmitt was allowed to manufacture aircraft again and lost interest in Fend's microcars. Messerschmitt sold the Regensburg works to Fend who, with brake and hub supplier Valentin Knott, formed Fahrzeug- und Maschinenbau GmbH Regensburg (FMR) to continue production of the KR200 and his other vehicles. In 1957 the KR201 Roadster was launched and remained in production until 1964 with very limited numbers produced. It had a frameless windscreen with no window frames, an optional folding cloth roof and removable side curtains made from transparent plastic. In February 1958, the KR200 Kabrio Limousine model was released, featuring a cloth convertible top and fixed side window frames. A Sport model was later offered with a cut down plexiglas windscreen with no roof and with fixed side panels so that the driver would have to climb in and out at the top of the car. Production of the Sport was extremely limited and, apart from the KR200 'Super' (see below) it is the rarest type of KR200.

Production of the KR200 was heavily reduced in 1962 and ceased in 1964. Sales had been dropping for a few years, as demand for basic economical transport in Germany diminished while the German economy boomed. A similar situation developed in other parts of Europe, such as in the manufacturer's biggest export destination, the United Kingdom, where sales were particularly affected and the Mini was becoming increasingly popular. A total of 30,286 units of the KR200 were built.

=== 24-hour record run ===
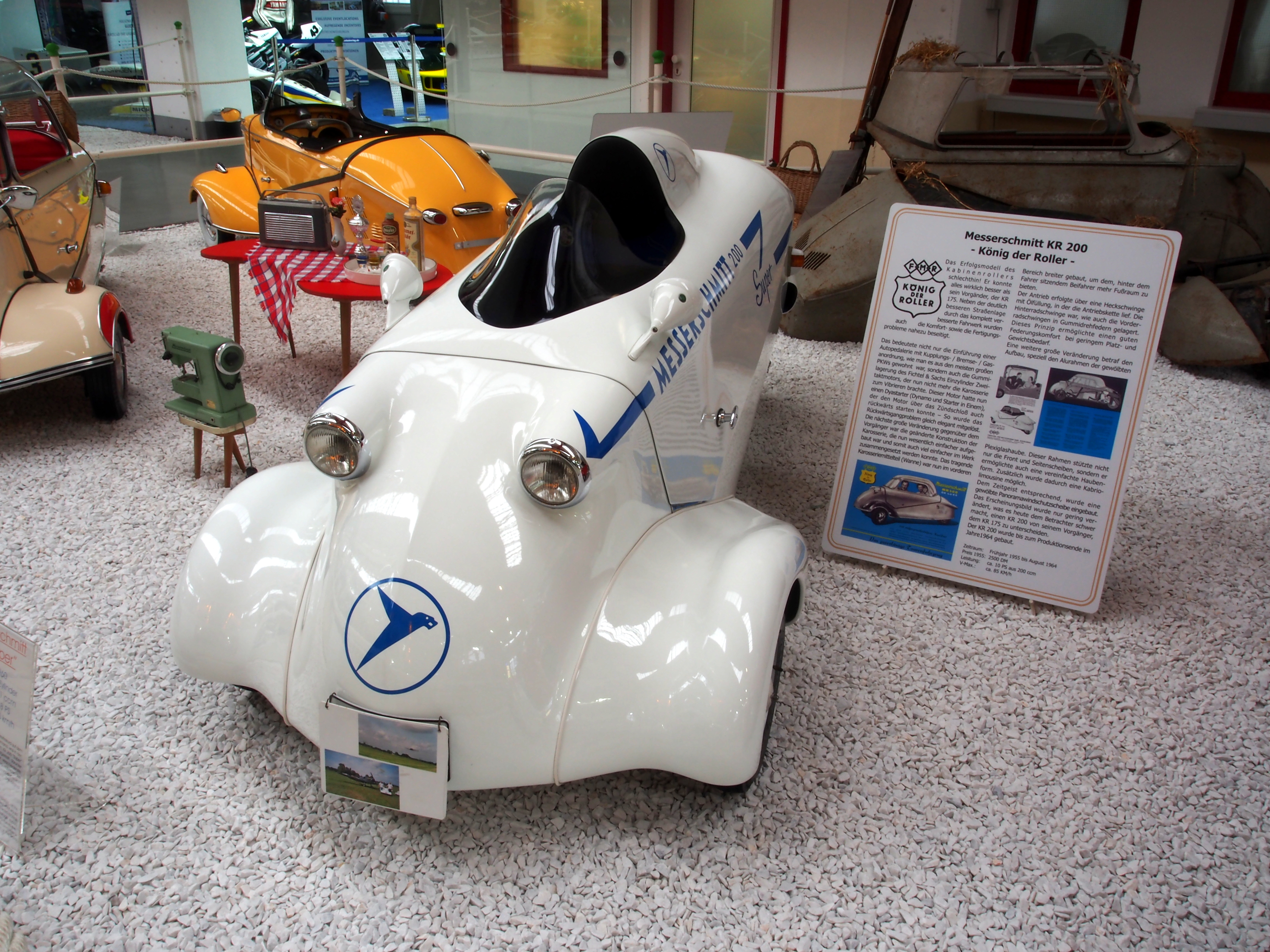
Messerschmitt record car

In 1955, in order to prove the KR200's durability, Messerschmitt prepared a KR200 to break the 24-hour speed record for three-wheeled vehicles under 250 cc (15.3 cu in). The record car had a special single-seat low-drag body and a highly modified engine, but the suspension, steering, and braking components were stock. Throttle, brake, and clutch cables were duplicated. The record car was run on 29–30 August 1955 at the Hockenheimring for 24 hours and broke 22 international speed records in its class, including the 24-hour speed record, which it set at 103 km/h (64 mph)

=== Messerschmitt Service Car ===
Messerschmitt, and subsequently FMR, made factory-converted Service Cars to order for the automobile service industry. Similar in concept to the Harley-Davidson Servi-Car and the Indian Dispatch Tow, the Service Car had a detachable tow bar and clamp, a revised front suspension to accommodate the tow bar when in use, and a storage system inside the car to accommodate the tow bar when not in use. The service technician would drive the Service Car to the customer's car and, if the customer's car was drivable, attach the tow bar to the front of the Service Car, clamp the other end of the tow bar to the bumper of the customer's car, and drive the customer's car to the garage. When the service was complete, he would drive the car back to the customer while towing the Service Car, detach the Service Car from the customer's car, and drive back to the garage. Approximately 12 were built; only one is known to exist at present.

== Features ==
The KR200 incorporated several features unique to the KR line and its four-wheeled derivative, the FMR Tg500. Externally, the narrow body, the transparent acrylic bubble canopy and low stance were among the more obvious features.

=== Tandem seating ===
The narrow body, and corresponding low frontal area, was achieved with tandem seating, which also allowed the body to taper like an aircraft fuselage, within a practical length. 10 PS (7.4 kW; 9.9 hp) propelled the KR200 to around 105 km/h (65 mph). The claimed fuel consumption of the car was 3.2 L/100 km (87 mpg_{‑imp}).

The tandem seating also centralized the mass of the car along the longitudinal axis which, combined with the low center of gravity, low weight, and wheel placement at the vehicle's extremes, gave the KR200 good handling characteristics A more minor advantage of tandem seating was that it made an export version to countries that drive on the left unnecessary. An "Export" model was built, but this denoted a more luxurious trim level.

=== Bubble canopy ===
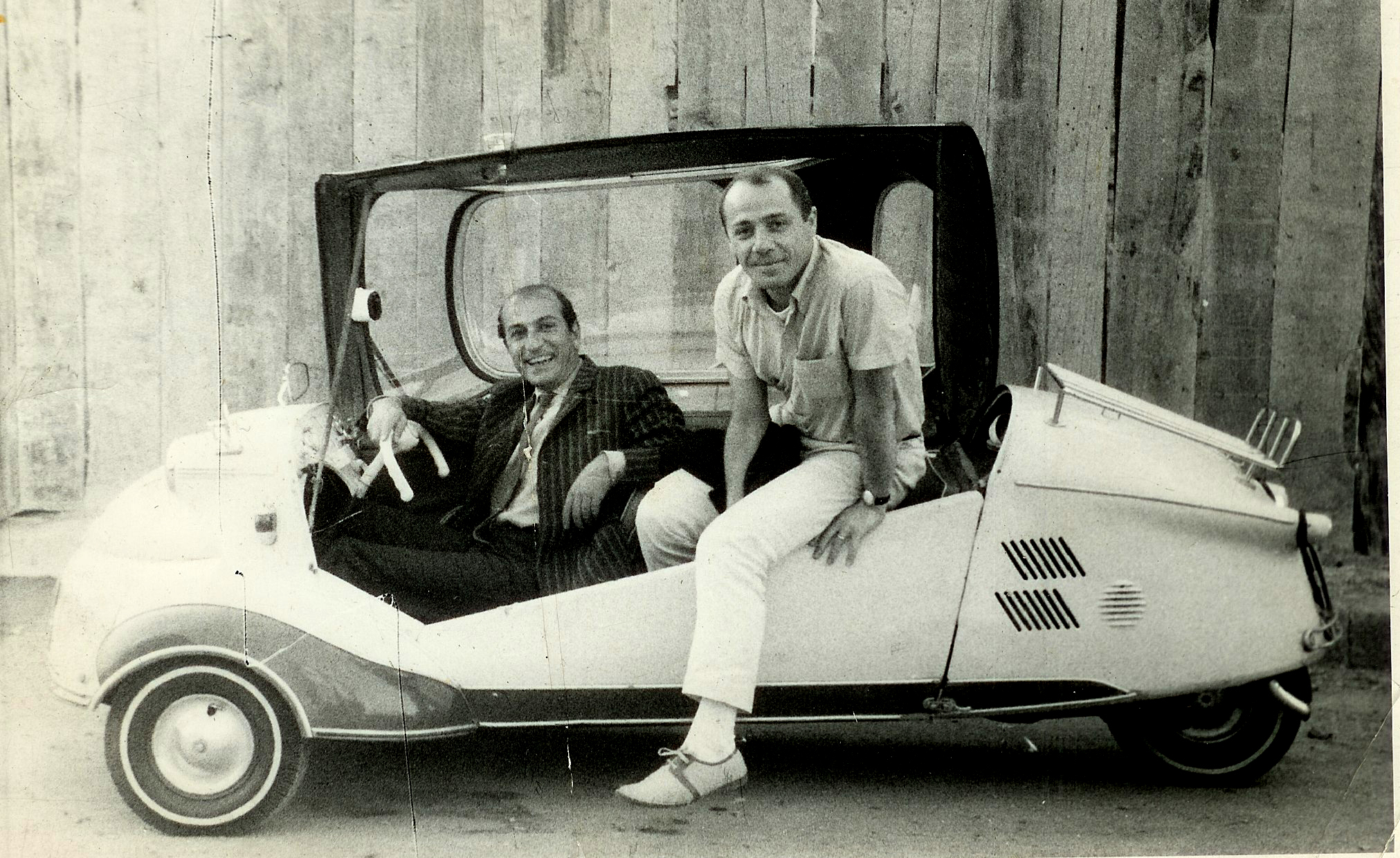
Messerschmitt Kabinenroller with Yılmaz Onay and Erol Keskin in Turkey, 1968

Entry to most KR models except the KR201 Sport Roadster and a corresponding Tg500 version was through a canopy door hinged on the right side of the vehicle. The door included all the windows (windshield, window frames on all but the Roadster models, folding top on Roadster and Kabrio models, and acrylic bubble on other versions) and the frame in which it was set, extending from the right side of the monocoque tub to the left. On Sport Roadster models, the canopy was fixed and there was neither a top nor any windows at all, only a tonneau cover.

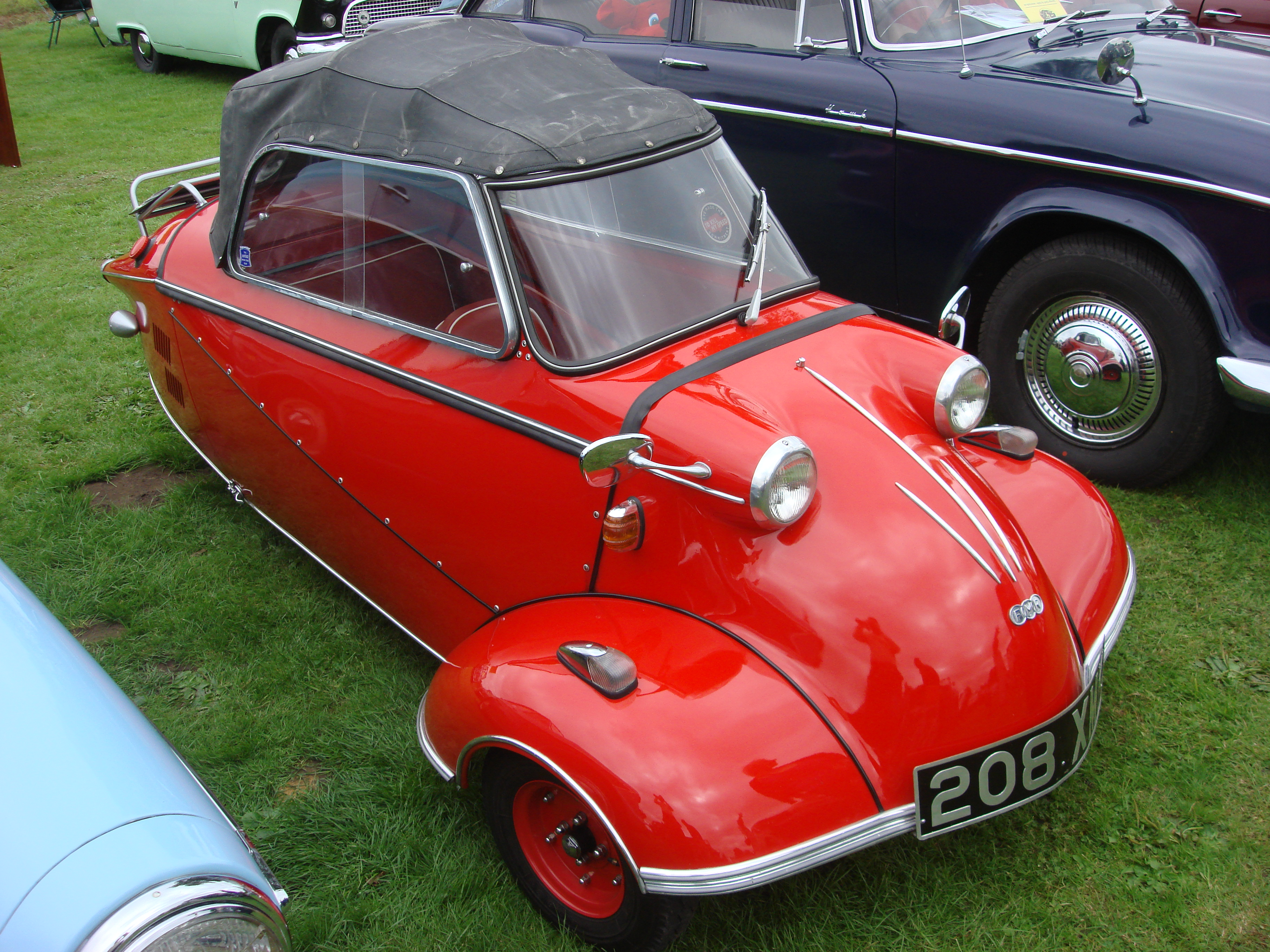
KR200 Kabrio; the folding top replaces the bubble in this version.

The bubble top on the KR200 was simplified over that of the KR175 by the use of a larger curved glass windshield that formed A-pillars with the side window frames. This allowed the bubble to be simpler and more compact than the KR175 bubble, and it was consequently easier and less expensive to produce. The windshield wiper, initially manual on the KR175, was electric on the KR200.

=== Engine and transmission ===
The KR200 ran on a 191 cc (11.7 cu in) Fichtel & Sachs forced-air (fan) cooled single cylinder two-stroke engine positioned in front of the rear wheel, just behind the passenger's seat. The engine had two sets of contact breaker points and, to reverse, the engine was stopped and then restarted, going backwards. This was effected by pushing the key further in the ignition switch than normal, whether intentionally or not. One result of this was that the KR200's sequential, positive-stop transmission provided the car with the same four gear ratios available in reverse as in forward movement.

=== Controls ===
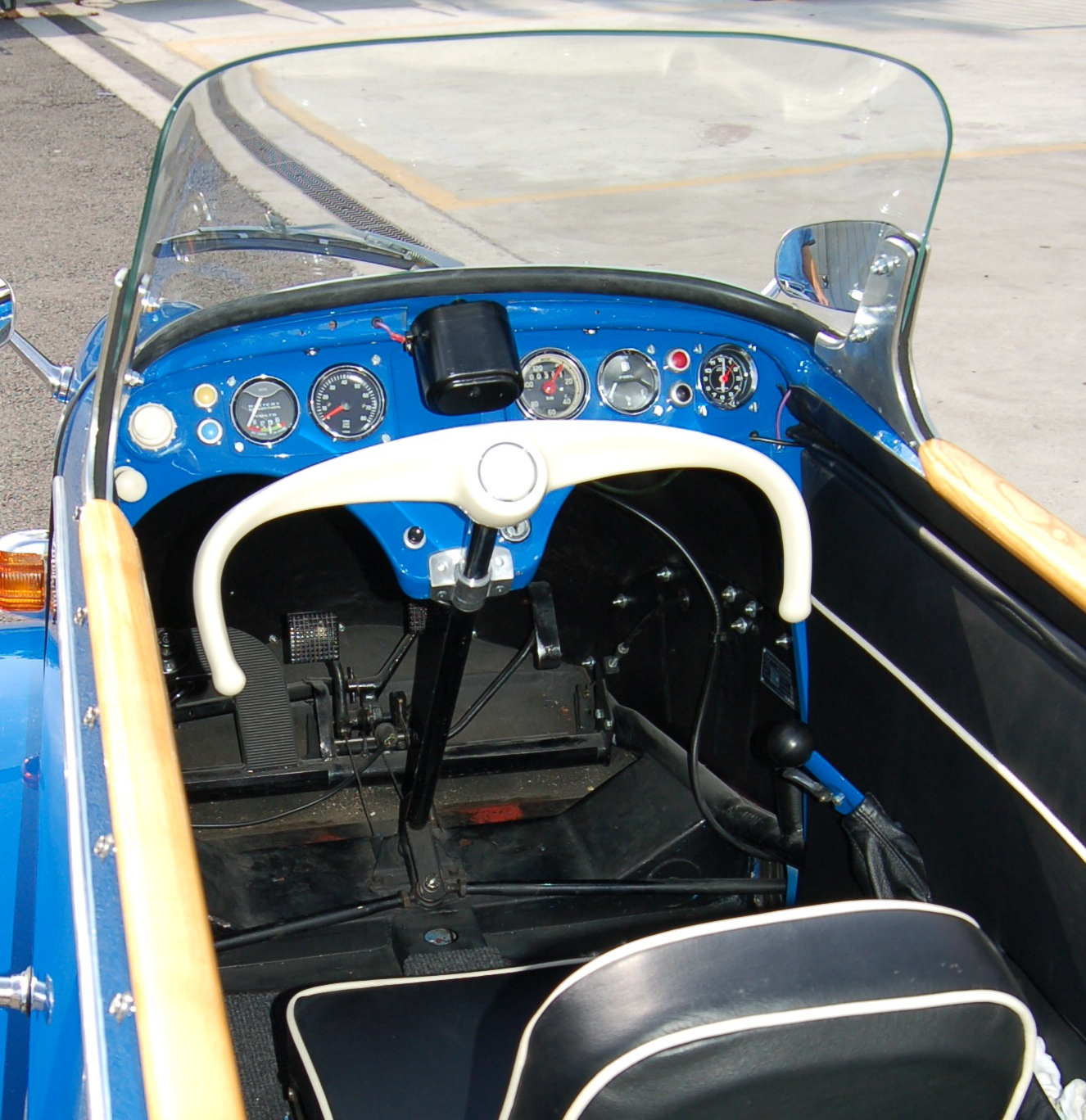
Instruments and controls of a KR201 Roadster

Apart from the dual-mode ignition, the KR200 had a steering bar reminiscent of that of an aircraft. To steer the KR200, the driver would swivel the steering bar about its axis from the horizontal (straight-ahead) position instead of rotating it as with a conventional steering wheel. The mechanism was connected directly to the track rods of the front wheels, providing an extremely direct response best suited to small amounts of movement, unlike other common steering mechanisms which involved reduction gearing. The gearshift lever had a secondary lever on it which, when actuated, would put the car in neutral regardless of what gear it had been in before, although the transmission would have to be shifted back to first before the car would be able to move from a standstill.

Unlike the KR175, the KR200 had an accelerator pedal rather than a twist grip. The brake pedal still operated mechanical brakes using cables.

== See also ==
- Bubble car
- Canopy door
- Carver (automobile), another tandem-seating car
- Corbin Sparrow
- Heinkel Kabine
- Isetta
- List of microcars by country of origin
- Microcar
- Velorex
