= Imme R100 =

Lightweight motorcycle made by Riedel AG

- Imme R100 viewed from the left
- Manufacturer: Riedel AG
- Also called: Riedel R100; Riedel Imme
- Production: 1948-1950
- Assembly: Immenstadt, West Germany
- Successor: ZMG R175
- Class: Standard
- Engine: 99 cc (6.0 cu in) piston-ported two-stroke single-cylinder engine
- Bore / stroke: 52 mm × 47 mm (2.0 in × 1.9 in)
- Power: 4.5 PS (3.3 kW; 4.4 hp) at 5,800 rpm
- Ignition type: kick start
- Transmission: Three forward speeds with no neutral position
- Frame type: Tubular steel spine frame, with engine mounted on the swingarm
- Suspension: Front: Single-sided girder fork with coil spring and friction damper Rear: Single-sided swingarm with coil spring and friction damper
- Brakes: Drum brakes, front and rear
- Tyres: 2.50 x 19, front & rear

The Imme R100 was a lightweight motorcycle produced by Riedel AG between 1948 and 1951. It became known for its simple yet innovative design, incorporating a number of advanced technical features. Thanks to its low cost and engineering novelty, the R100 achieved strong sales. However, reliability problems and low profit margins resulted in warranty costs driving Riedel AG into bankruptcy.

The advanced specification of the Imme R100 caused it to be highly regarded. The R100 was one of the motorcycles included in "The Art of the Motorcycle" exhibition at the Solomon R. Guggenheim Museum in 1998 and is on permanent display at Barber Vintage Motorsports Museum.

== Concept, design and engineering ==
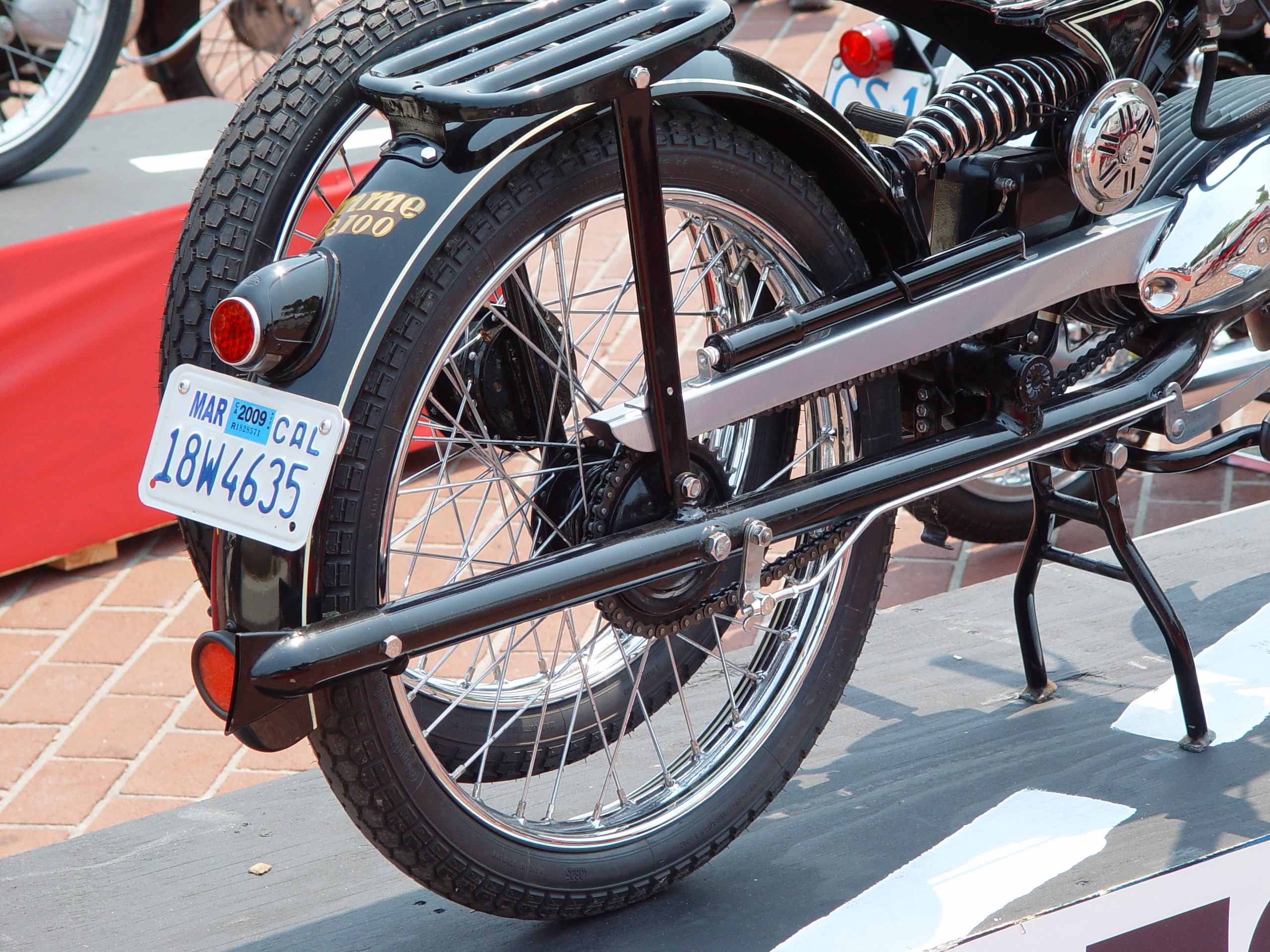
Imme R100 rear suspension and swingarm/exhaust pipe. A spare wheel is mounted on the left side of the rear wheel.

Motorcycle engineer Norbert Riedel recognized the need for a simple and economical light motorcycle during Germany's recovery from the Second World War and began to design one. By the summer of 1947, a prototype frame had been built and tested. The spine frame was made from 40 mm steel tubing, as were the steering head, the single-sided front fork, and the single-sided swingarm. The wheels were interchangeable, and were mounted from the left on stub axles attached to the suspension on the right.

Riedel developed the engine at the same time. This was a piston-ported two-stroke single-cylinder engine of 99 cc (6.0 cu in) capacity. The engine was cast in light alloy around the cylinder liner, and had an integral cylinder head. The crankshaft was suspended on only one side. The power output of the engine was 4.5 PS (3.3 kW; 4.4 hp) at 5,800 rpm, which was considered a high output at the time. Contemporary engines of comparable size typically made about 2.5 PS (1.8 kW; 2.5 hp), and 4.5 PS was expected from 125 cc engines such as those used in the DKW RT 125 and the later Hoffmann Vespa.

The transmission had three speeds with no neutral position; a mechanism held the clutch open when the motorcycle was at idle in first gear. First gear was positioned in the middle of the shift pattern, with second gear below and third gear above.

The engine and transmission were mounted together on the swingarm in front of the pivot axle at the bottom of the spine frame. The near-horizontal engine and transmission together as a unit formed a "power egg" style which would later be used by Benelli and Motobi. The tubular swingarm also served as the exhaust pipe. Behind the pivot axle, the swingarm, the reinforced rear fender, and the supports for the rear carrier formed a triangular structure which supported the rear spring. This suspension system allowed a long suspension travel and a soft spring rate. Test rides on the complete prototype began in December 1947 and showed that the combination of long travel and soft springs needed damping. Friction dampers were added.

== Production, marketing and demise ==
Norbert Riedel registered Riedel AG in 1948. He moved his facilities from Muggendorf to Immenstadt and began production there in June 1948. It is widely believed that the name "Imme" came from an abbreviation of this location, and that the Imme's "bee on wheels" logo came from "Imme" being a dialect word meaning "bee". However, it has also been suggested that the name came from the motorcycle itself resembling a bee, or from the engine sounding like a buzzing bee.

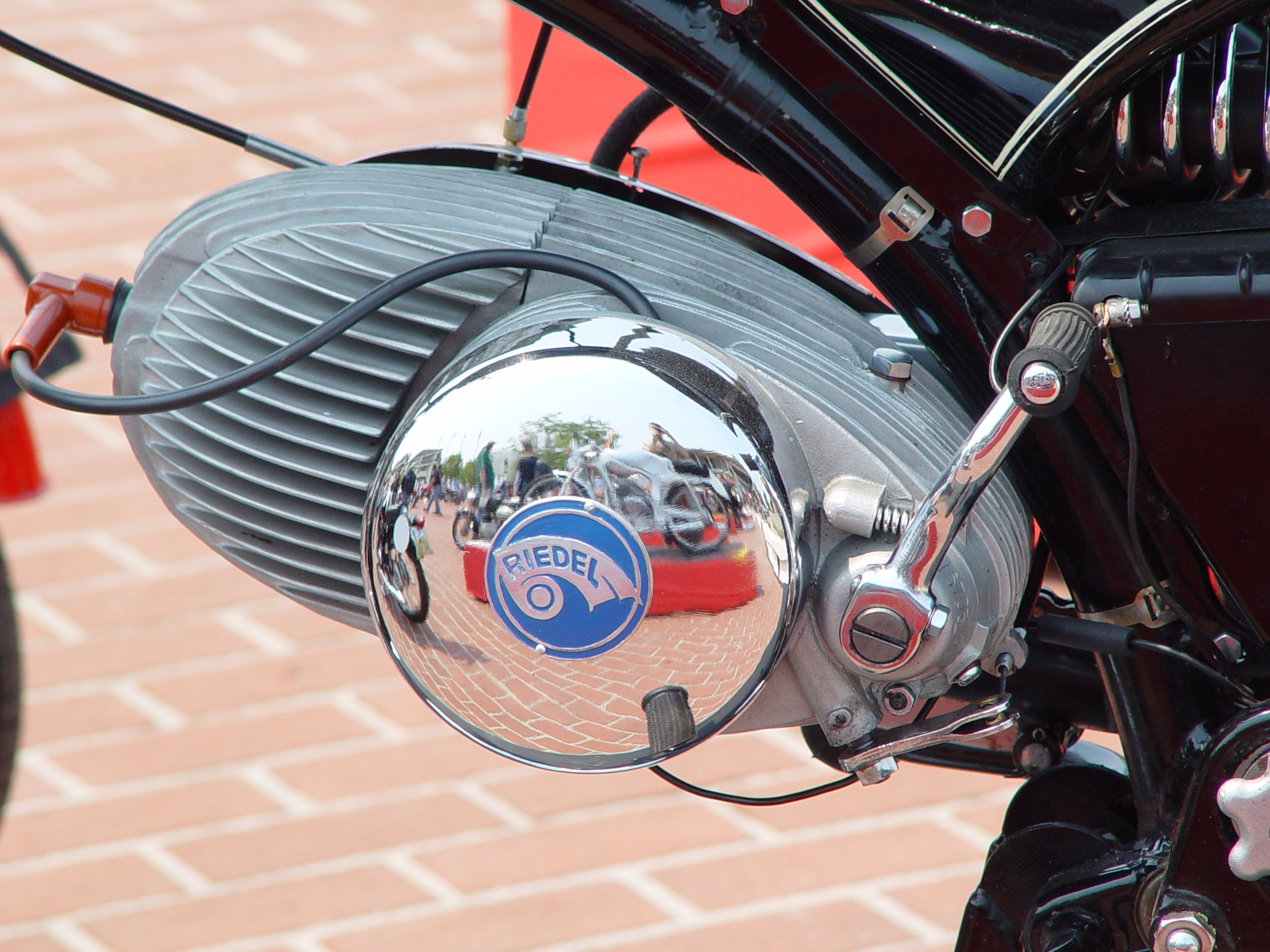
Imme R100 engine

The Imme R100's light weight, relatively powerful engine, and long travel suspension made it popular in motorsport; this, along with good marketing and low pricing, led to strong sales. The management of Riedel AG expected high sales volume to offset the low profit margin. A basic Imme sold for 775 Deutschmark without battery, tachometer, or centre stand. Passenger accommodation was an optional extra, as was a spare wheel. Initially, Immes were all painted oxide red.

In 1950, a better-equipped "Export" version became available for 850 Deutschmark with a battery, an electric horn, a centre stand, a speedometer, a more comfortable seat, chrome plating, pinstriping, and a choice of colours including lime green and gloss black. Production of the Imme R100 had gone up to 1,000 per month and, by the autumn of 1950, more than 10,000 had been sold.

Imme engines were also sold to Fritz Fend, to power his Fend Flitzer invalid carriages. These replaced the Fichtel & Sachs engines used in earlier versions of the Flitzer.

However, the Imme began to develop problems, especially with the single-sided crankshaft bearings and the freewheel for the kick starter. Riedel corrected the problem beginning with the Model D version, which had a conventional crankshaft with two bearings. However, the profit from sales was not enough to cover the warranty expenses, and, by the end of 1950, Riedel AG went bankrupt with debts of 1.25 million Deutschmark.

== Legacy ==
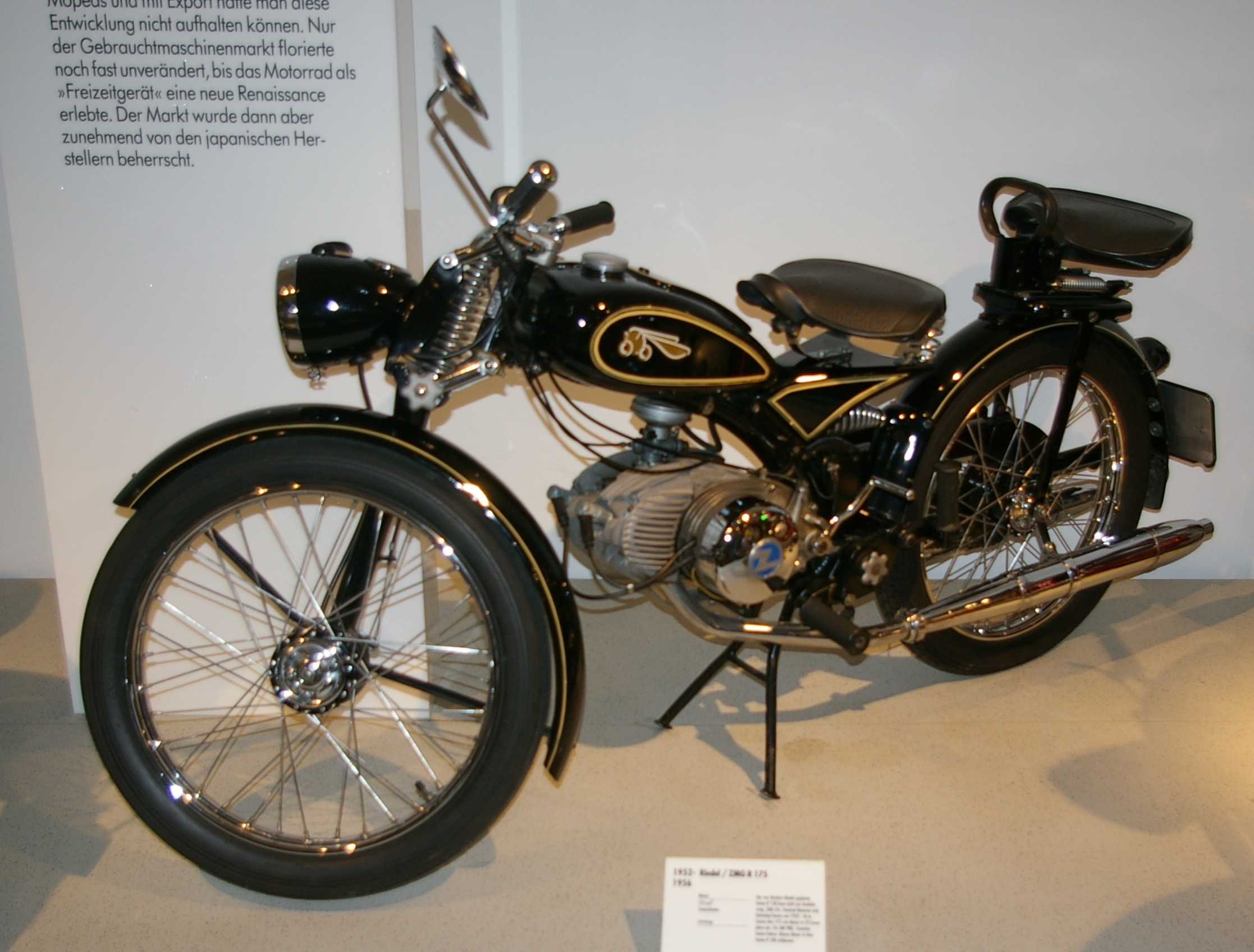
A ZMG R175 "Imme"

At the time of Riedel AGs bankruptcy, three prototypes of an Imme with a 150 cc parallel twin two-stroke engine had been made. Fritz Philipps, who had been a senior executive at Riedel AG, formed Zweirad-Motoren und -Getriebe GmbH (ZMG) to supply parts and perform repairs on Imme motorcycles. ZMG also set up to manufacture an Imme with a 175 cc straight-twin two-stroke engine, but made only 25 before they ended production.

The Imme R100 is noted for its simple and innovative design. Its advanced features include single-sided suspension front and rear, interchangeable wheels front and rear with the option of a spare tyre, the complete drivetrain mounted on the swingarm, and the swingarm tube used as the exhaust pipe. Remarking on the R100 being displayed in the Solomon R. Guggenheim Museum exhibition "The Art of the Motorcycle", Ultan Guilfoyle, curatorial adviser at the museum, said: "It's my favourite unknown bike. There are ideas there that are 40 years ahead of their time." An R100 is on permanent display at the Barber Vintage Motorsports Museum.

== See also ==
- List of motorcycles of the 1940s
- List of motorcycles of the 1950s
