= Messerschmitt Kabinenroller =

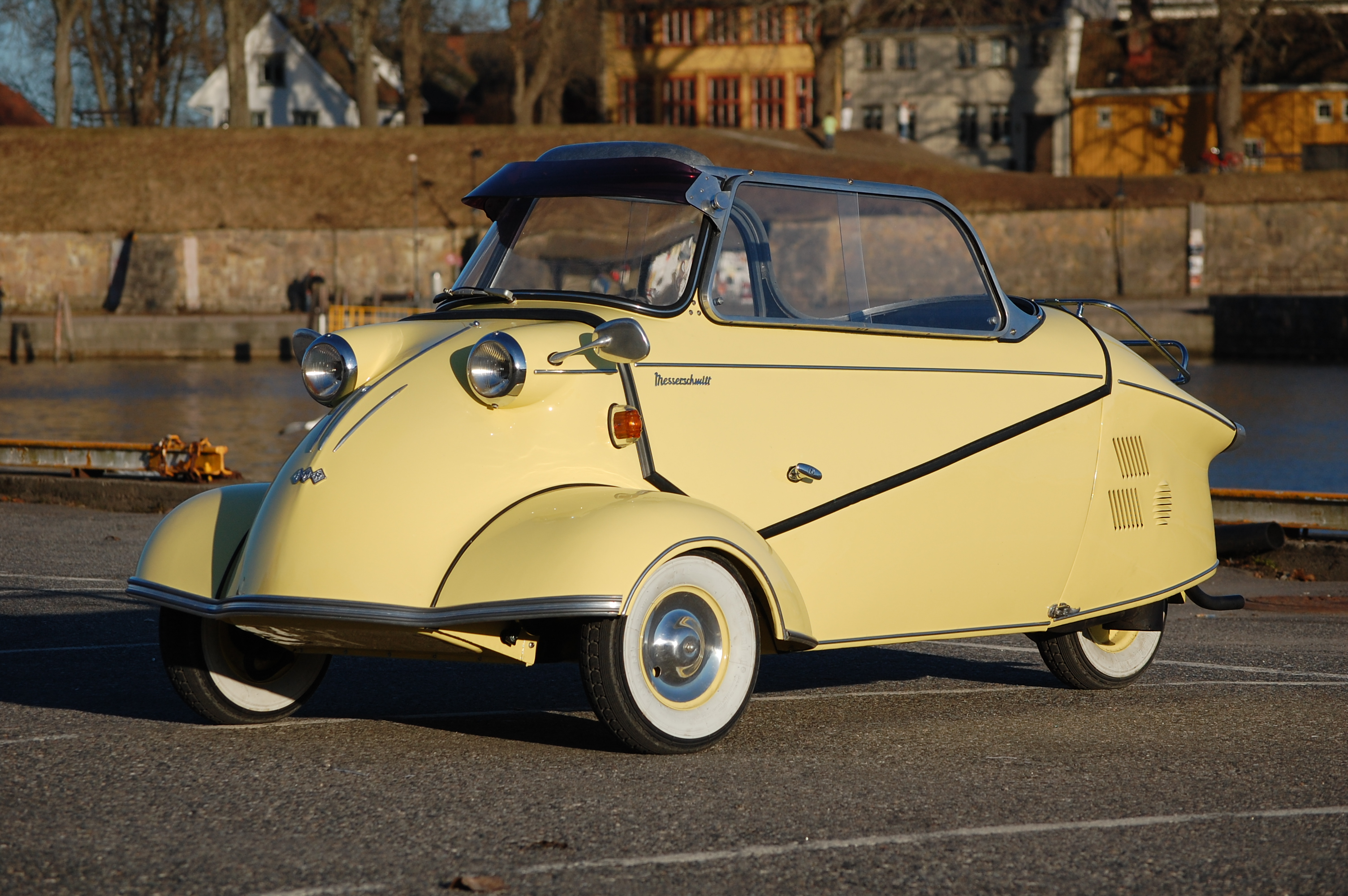
- 1959 Messerschmitt KR200 cabriolet

Overview
- Manufacturer: Messerschmitt (1953-1956); Fahrzeug- und Maschinenbau GmbH, Regensburg (1956-1964)
- Also called: Karo, Mivalino (Italian-built KR175s)
- Production: 1953-1964
- Assembly: Germany: Regensburg (Regensburger Stahl- u. Maschinenbau (1953-1956), Fahrzeug- und Maschinenbau GmbH, Regensburg (1956-1964)); Italy: Brescia (Metalmeccanica Italiana Valtrompio s.p.a.) (1954-1956)

Body and chassis
- Class: microcar
- Layout: RMR
- Body styles: Tandem 2-seat three-wheeler (except Tg500 with four wheels) with side-opening canopy: saloon, cabriolet, or open roadster, depending on canopy style.
- Vehicles: Messerschmitt KR175; Messerschmitt KR200; Messerschmitt KR201; FMR Tg500

Powertrain
- Engines: KR: Fichtel & Sachs two-stroke single cylinder: KR175: 173 cc; KR200: 191 cc; Tg500: 494 cc two-stroke straight-twin engine
- Transmissions: KR: Four forward speeds, sequential, unsynchronized Tg500: 4 speed H-pattern plus reverse

Dimensions
- Wheelbase: KR: 2,029.5 mm (79.9 in); Tg500: 1,884.7 mm (74.2 in)
- Length: KR: 2,819.4 mm (111 in); Tg500: 2,997.2 mm (118 in)
- Width: KR: 1,219.2–1,237.0 mm (48.0–48.7 in); Tg500: 1,270.0 mm (50.0 in)
- Height: KR: 1,198.9 mm (47.2 in); Tg500: 1,244.6 mm (49.0 in)
- Curb weight: 218–389 kg (480–858 lb)

The Messerschmitt Kabinenroller (Messerschmitt Cabin Scooter) was a series of microcars made by RSM Messerschmitt from 1953 to 1956 and by Fahrzeug- und Maschinenbau GmbH, Regensburg (FMR) from 1956 to 1964. All the Messerschmitt and FMR production cars used the Kabinenroller's monocoque structure, featuring tandem seating and usually a bubble canopy.

The Kabinenroller platform was used for four microcars, the three-wheeled Messerschmitt KR175 (1953-1955), Messerschmitt KR200 (1955-1964) and Messerschmitt KR201, and the four-wheeled FMR Tg500 (1957-1961). The platform and all four cars using it were designed by Fritz Fend.

== History ==
The Kabinenroller was designed and developed by Fritz Fend for Messerschmitt AG. Fend had earlier designed and built a series of unpowered and powered invalid carriages, leading up to his Fend Flitzer. Fend noticed that able-bodied people were buying Flitzers for use as personal transport. That led him to believe that a mass-produced two-seat version of the Flitzer would have a ready market. A search for a manufacturer interested in the project led him to Messerschmitt, which had him develop the project for production at their Regensburg factory.

The Kabinenroller was designed and developed for production in 1952 and 1953. Production of the original version, the KR175, began in February 1953. 70 modifications had been made to the design by June 1953.

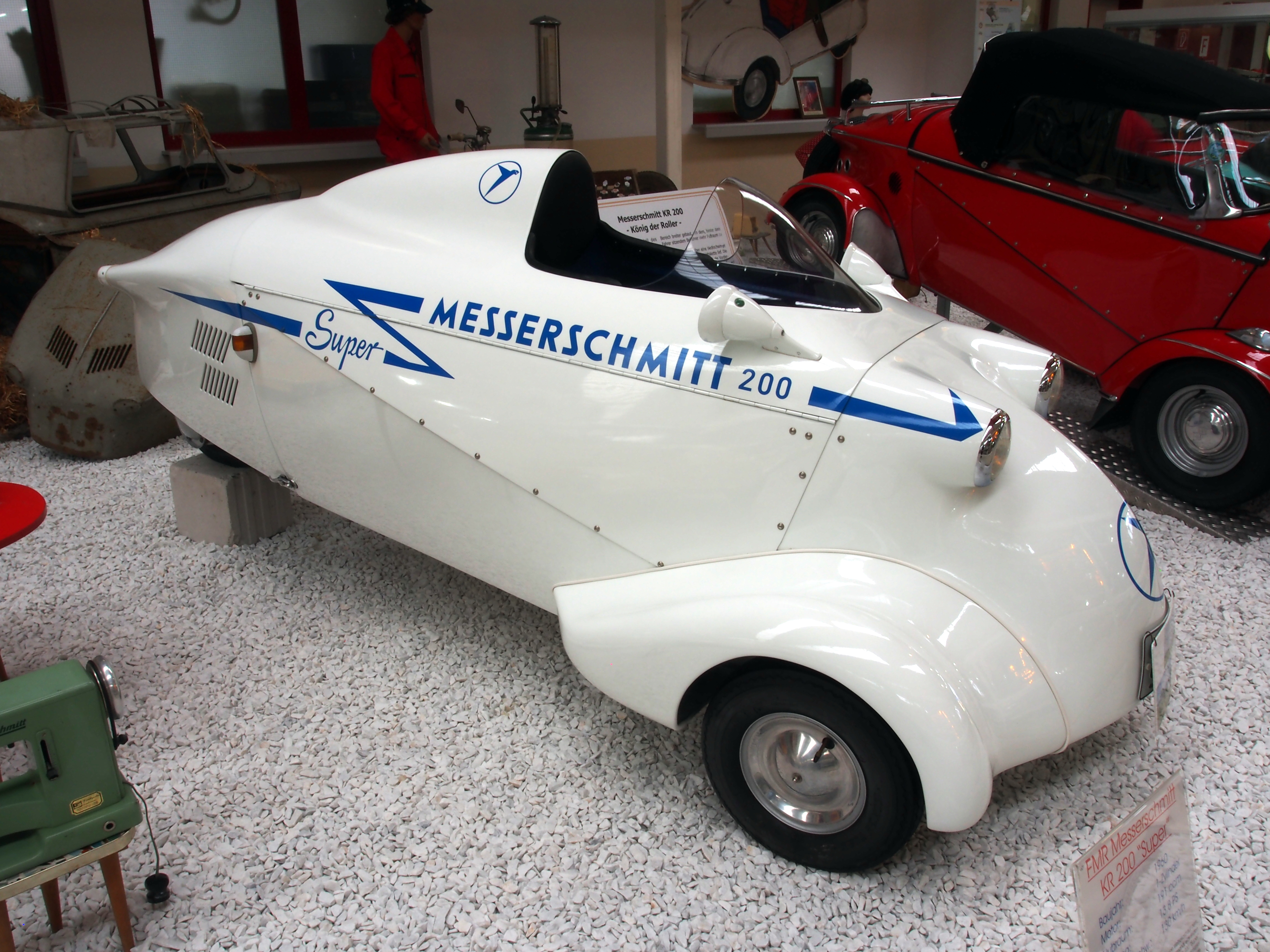
Messerschmitt KR200-based record car at Technik Museum Speyer

The KR200 was developed on the Kabinenroller platform and replaced the KR175 in 1955. Based on the same frame and an evolution of the original suspension, the KR200 had a large number of detail changes. On 29–30 August 1955, a modified KR200 with a tuned engine, revised gear ratios, redundant control cables, a one-off streamlined body, and stock suspension, damping, steering, and brakes, was run at the Hockenheimring for twenty-four hours. During the run, the vehicle set twenty-two closed-circuit speed records for three-wheeled vehicles with displacements up to 250 cc, including the 50-mile (80 km) record at 107 km/h (66.5 mph) and the twenty-four-hour record at 103 km/h (64 mph).

== Design ==
=== Frame ===
The Kabinenroller was based on a central monocoque tub made from pressed steel sheet and tubular steel. The earlier Kr175 had triangular form of steel reinforced floor. The tub tapered upward from front to rear with a bulkhead at the back. The bulkhead supported a tubular steel subframe and acted as the firewall. The subframe supported the engine and the rear suspension. The engine cover was hinged to the monocoque structure. The fuel tank was in the top of the engine cover and fed the carburettor by gravity.

The monocoque tub, with the bulkhead at the back, a nose section at the front, and an access hatch system overhead, formed a passenger compartment for a driver and a passenger sitting in tandem. The base plate on which the hatch was hinged was riveted to the right side of the monocoque tub and the nose section. The hatch was made of a steel sheet base with a glass windshield, a plexiglas bubble canopy, and a framed set of sliding windows on either side of the canopy. In Germany the Kabinenroller got the nickname "Schneewittchensarg" (Snow White's coffin) because of the plexiglas canopy.

The tandem seating allowed the body to be long and narrow, with a low frontal area. This also allowed the body to taper like an aircraft fuselage, within a practical length.

=== Suspension ===
Front suspension of the Kr 200 Kabinenroller (the Kr175 had a different arrangement with rubber cones) was by a transverse lower arm sprung by a torsional 3-element rubber spring at the inside end. Front suspension travel was limited by rubber buffers. Rear suspension was by a trailing arm similar to a single-sided motorcycle swingarm which also formed the enclosure for the chain drive to the rear wheel. The trailing arm was suspended by another torsional rubber spring. Hydraulic dampers were added to the design with the introduction of the KR200 in 1955; also the front track was increased at that time.

==== Steering ====
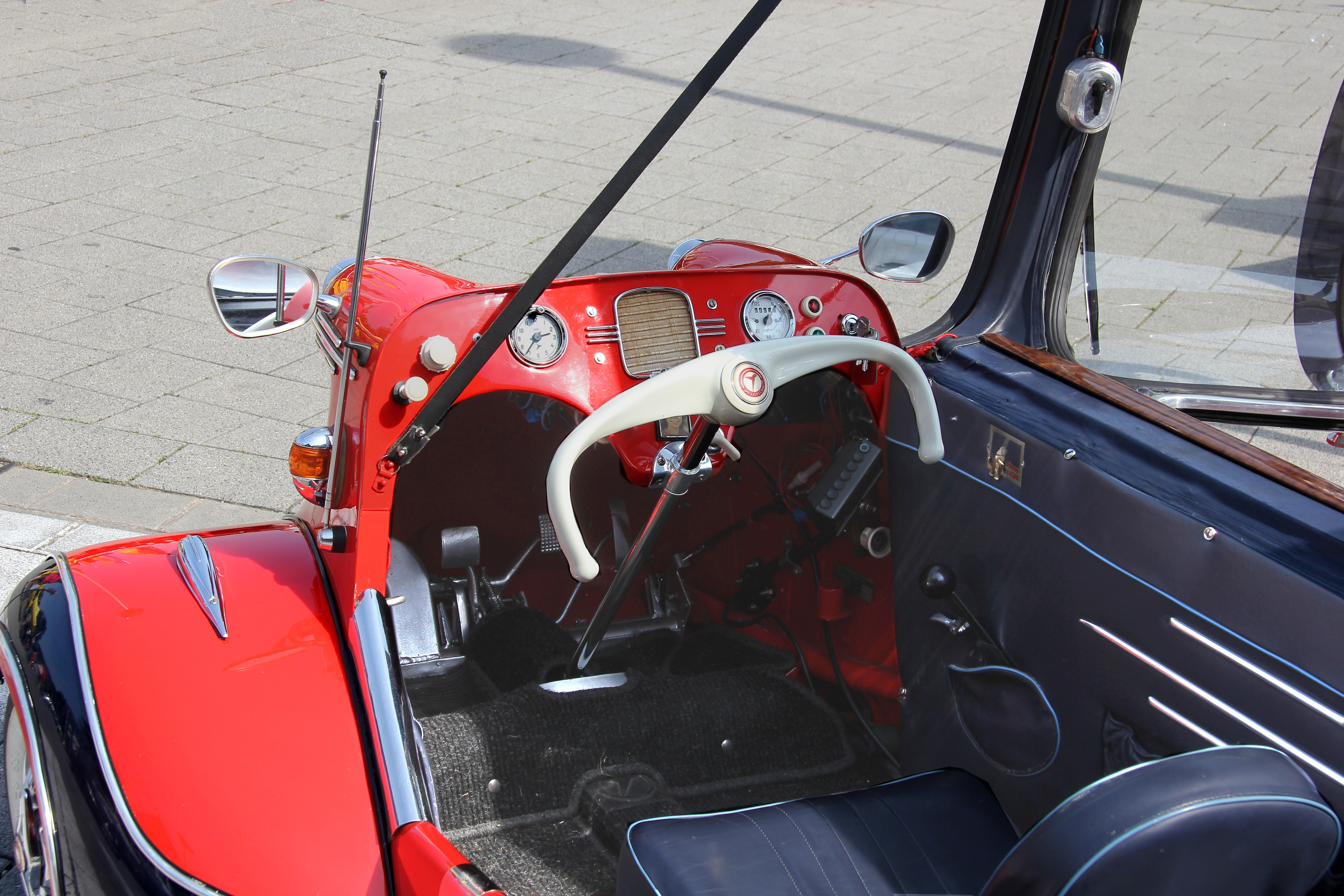
Steering control for Messerschmitt KR200

The shaft of the steering control was connected directly to the track rods controlling the front wheels, resulting in approximately one-third of a turn from the left extreme to the right extreme ("lock to lock"). The handlebar-shaped steering control would be operated with small, controlled inputs by swivelling the steering bar about its axis from the horizontal (straight-ahead) position instead of rotating it as with a conventional steering wheel.

== Tg500 sports car ==
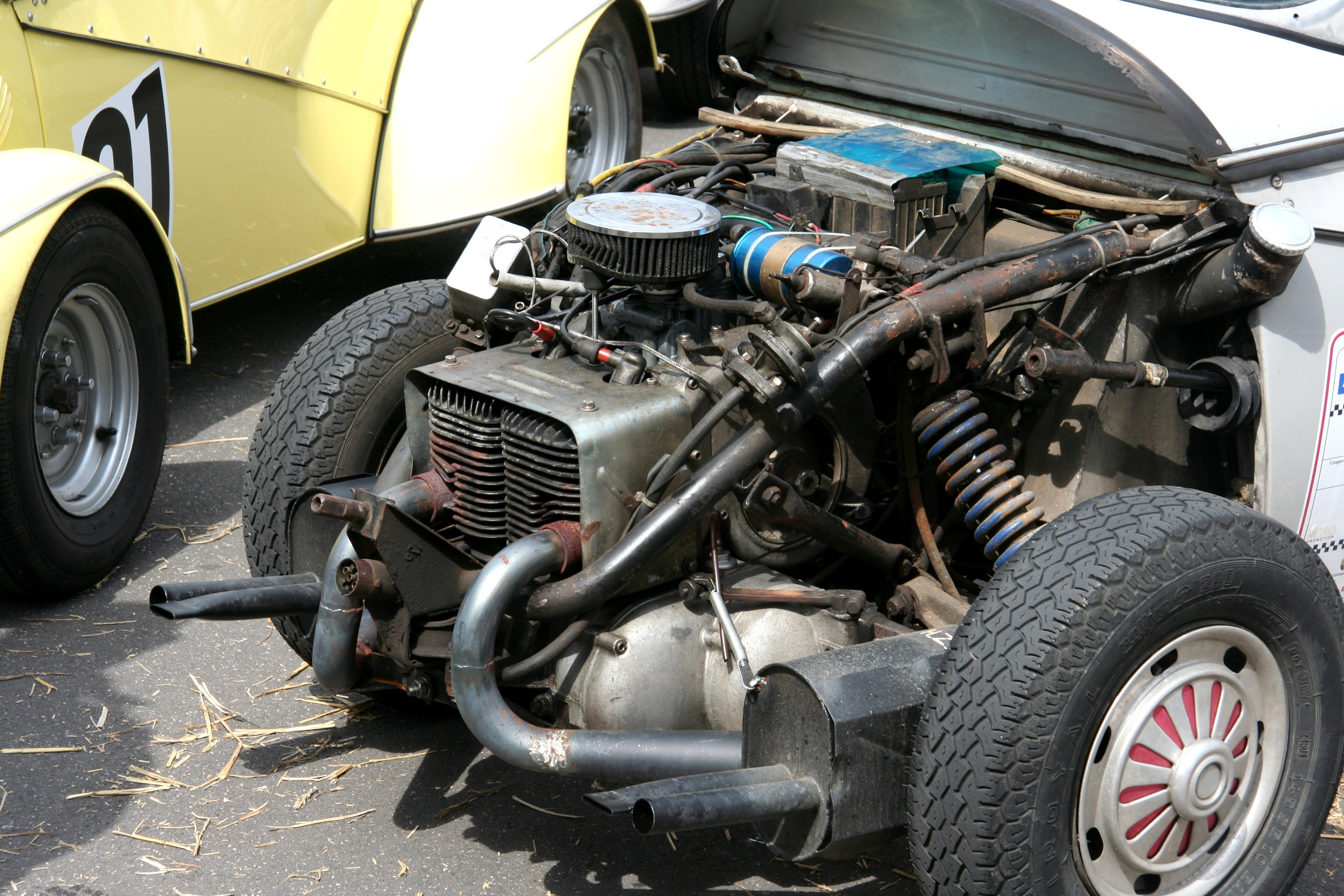
Rear subassembly of a Tg500 showing the engine and parts of the suspension, including an upper spring mount on the subframe

The performance of the record car persuaded Fend to design a sports car based on the Kabinenroller platform. The FMR Tg500 was introduced in 1958, two years after Fahrzeug- und Maschinenbau Gmbh, Regensburg (FMR) took over production of the Kabinenroller from Messerschmitt. The Tg500 used the Kabinenroller's unit body, front bodywork, front suspension, and steering system, but the rear subframe and bodywork were completely different.

The Tg500's most noticeable difference from other Kabinenrollern is its pair of rear wheels. These were driven by halfshafts with universal joints at both ends and a sliding spline allowing the length of the shaft to vary, accommodating changes in camber angle. The wheels were suspended by control arms and coil springs with concentric hydraulic shock absorbers. The rear track was 1,044 mm (41.1 in)

The tubular subframe to which the rear suspension was attached also held the drivetrain, which consisted of a transversely-mounted FMR 500 L straight-twin two-stroke engine and an unsynchronized four-speed transaxle with a reverse gear.

The Tg500 had a front track of 1,110 mm (43.7 in), up from the KR200's 1,080 mm (42.5 in). It also used larger tires, 4.40 x 10 to the KR200's 4.40 x 8, and four-wheel hydraulic brakes.

== Revival ==
In 2014, German engineer Achim Adlfinger revealed a pedal powered Kabinenroller prototype named the 'Veloschmitt' at the Special Human Powered Vehicle Show in Germersheim. Strongly positive public and press reaction prompted Adlfinger to begin production of the 'Veloschmitt' in Ljubljana, Slovenia, but the project was later halted due to financial difficulties.

In 2019, amid continued public support for the project, Adlfinger began financing the project himself, this time building 125cc petrol and electric versions of the Messerschmitt, alongside the pedal-powered version. The new Kabinenroller, named the KR202, featured a fibreglass body mounted on a steel and aluminium honeycomb chassis and used the powertrain from a petrol powered or electric scooter, depending on the version. Production commenced in Spain in 2021, with order books being opened later that year.
