= Messerschmitt KR175 =

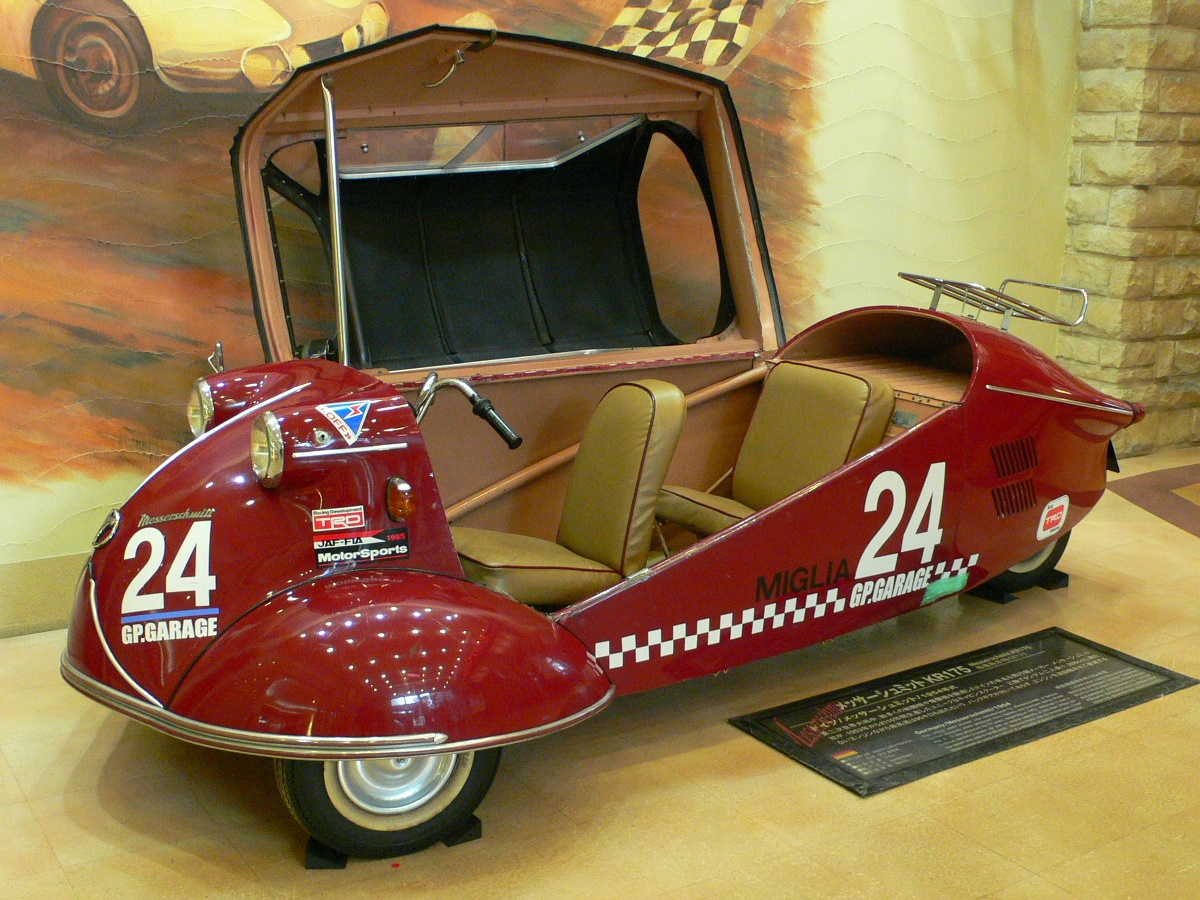

Overview
- Manufacturer: Messerschmitt
- Also called: Kabineneroller, Karo; Mivalino (license-built in Italy)
- Production: 1953–1955
- Assembly: Regensburg, Germany; Brescia, Italy (under license)
- Designer: Fritz Fend

Body and chassis
- Class: Microcar
- Body style: 1-door coupe
- Layout: Rear mid-engine, rear-wheel-drive
- Platform: Messerschmitt Kabinenroller
- Doors: Canopy
- Related: Messerschmitt KR200; FMR Tg500

Powertrain
- Engine: Fichtel & Sachs two-stroke single cylinder, pull start or optional electric start
- Transmission: Four forward speeds, sequential, unsynchronized.

Dimensions
- Wheelbase: 2.029 m (6 ft 7.9 in)
- Length: 2.820 m (9 ft 3.0 in)
- Width: 1.220 m (4 ft 0 in)
- Height: 1.200 m (3 ft 11.2 in)
- Curb weight: 220 kg (485 lb)

Chronology
- Predecessor: Fend Flitzer
- Successor: Messerschmitt KR200

The Messerschmitt KR175 microcar (1953–1955) was the first vehicle built by Messerschmitt under its 1952 agreement with Fritz Fend. In concept, although not in actual design, it was, in principle, a development of the Fend Flitzer invalid carriage. Approximately 15,000 were built before it was replaced by the Messerschmitt KR200 in 1955.

== History ==
Messerschmitt KR175

Messerschmitt, temporarily not allowed to manufacture aircraft after the Second World War, had turned its resources to producing other products. In 1952, Fend approached Messerschmitt with the idea of manufacturing small motor vehicles, based on his Fend Flitzer invalid carriage.

The first of Fend's vehicles to enter production at Messerschmitt's Regensburg factory was the KR175 (prototypes had been designated FK150—Fend Kabinenroller 150 ("scooter with cabin")—with a 150cc F&S engine). While the Messerschmitt name and insignia were used on the car, a separate company, incorporated as Regensburger Stahl- und Metallbau GmbH (RSM), was created to manufacture and market the vehicle.

There were several problems with the first KR175s made, requiring 70 design modifications between the beginning of production in February and June 1953. The KR200 was developed from the KR175 and replaced it in 1955; it was superficially very similar but with many fundamental changes.

== Features ==
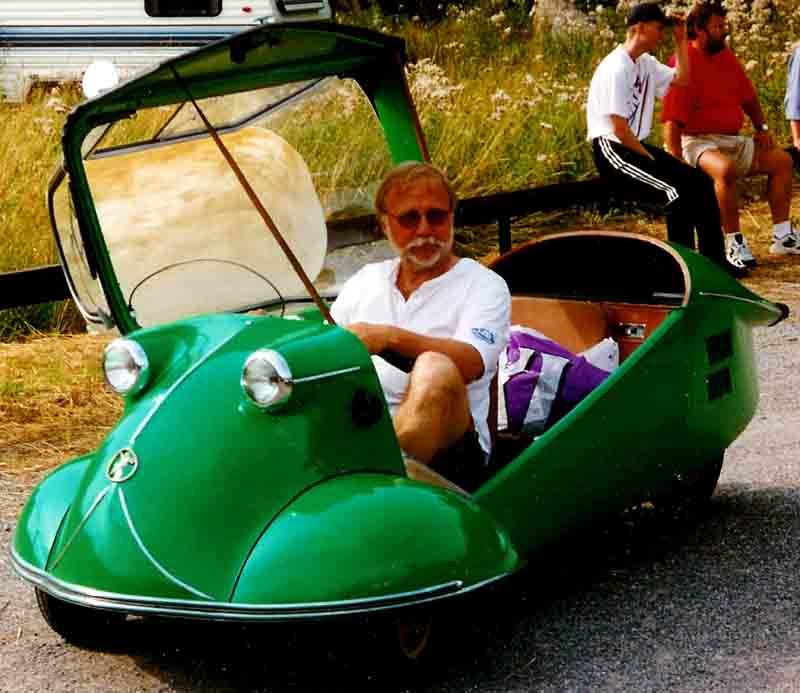
1954 Messerschmitt K175

The KR175 had an all steel space-frame type tubular construction and unlike the later KR200, the floor was reinforced with tubes and an indented firewall behind which the engine was centrally mounted. Tandem seating was accessed by a hatch that opened upward and to the right. The standard version of the KR175's hatch had a canopy made from a large Plexiglas dome with a cutout at the front for a small, flat glass windshield and a cutout on either side for the frames for the sliding windows. A "sportster" model was available without the dome or the windows, with only the windshield attached. On early models, the windshield wiper was manually operated.

The front fenders did not have wheel cutouts.

=== Engine and transmission ===
The KR175 ran on a 173 cc (10.6 cu in) Fichtel & Sachs air-cooled single cylinder two-stroke engine centrally positioned in front of the rear wheel, just behind the passenger's seat. The engine was started with a pull rope as standard, but there was an option of an electric starter. The electric starter became standard in 1954. The transmission was a sequential, positive-stop type with four speeds and no synchronization nor reverse gear.

=== Controls ===
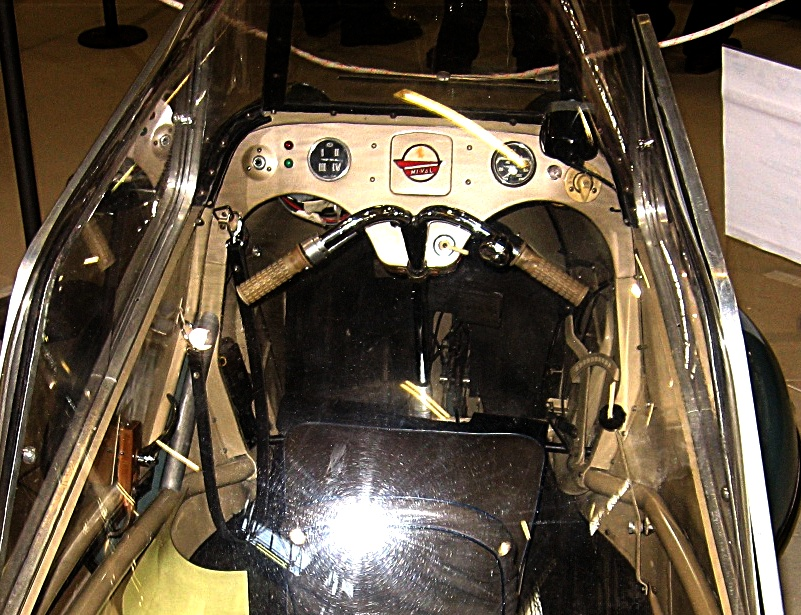
Mivalino controls, similar to those of the KR175

The KR175 used the standard Kabinenroller steering system, with a tubular steel steering bar connected directly to the track rods of the front wheels, providing an extremely direct response best suited to small, measured inputs. The gearshift lever, on the right side of the cockpit, had a secondary lever on it which operated the clutch. The throttle was operated by a twist-grip on the left handlebar. The footbrake pedal, the only pedal in the car, operated brakes on all three wheels mechanically, using cables. The handbrake lever operated similarly.

In 1954, the clutch lever was replaced by a pedal.

== MI-VAL Mivalino ==
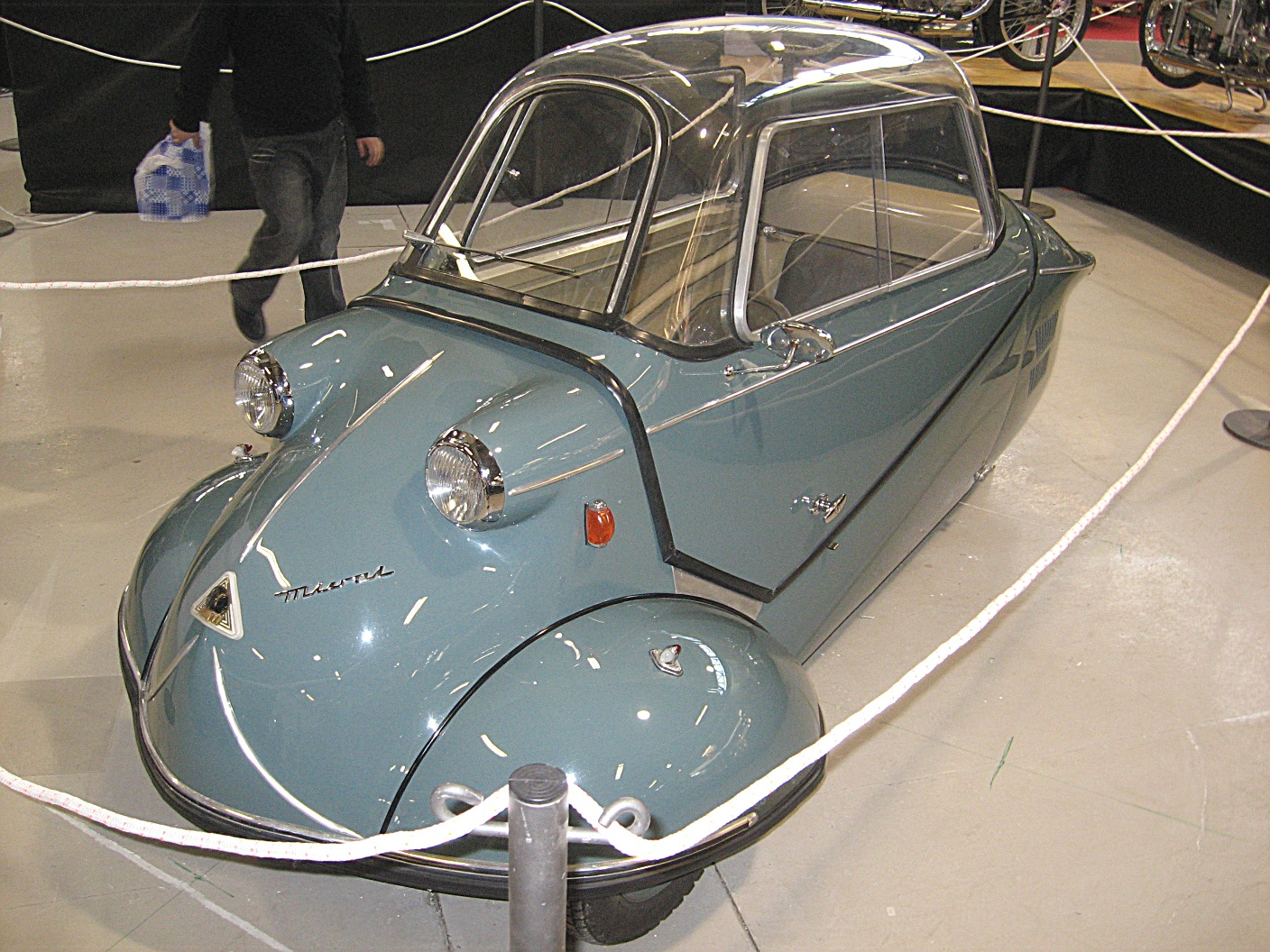
MI-VAL Mivalino

Italian motorcycle manufacturer Metalmeccanica Italiana Valtrompia s.p.a., makers of the brand MI-VAL, assembled KR175s in Brescia, Italy, using components imported from Messerschmitt and their own 172 cc (10.5 cu in) two-stroke engine. These cars were sold as the MI-VAL Mivalino.

== Data ==
- Configuration: mid (rear) engine, rear drive
- Seating, front/rear: 1/1
- Weather protection: bubble canopy coupe
- Heating/air conditioning: none/none
- Engine type: Fichtel & Sachs, 1 cylinder, 2 stroke
- Displacement: 174 cc
- Bore x stroke— 62 x 58 mm
- Compression: 6.8:1
- Power: 6.7 kW (9.0 hp) @ 5,250 rpm
- Cooling: air, with fan
- Starter: kick starter, later Dynastart
- Drive: 4 speed and chain to single rear wheel
- Brakes: 3 wheel
- Suspension: rubber cones with no damping.
- Wheel size: 4.00 by 8 in
- Dimensions (length/width/height) (m): 2.820 m (111.0 in)/1.220 m (48.0 in)/1.200 m (47.2 in)
- Wheelbase: 2.030 m (79.9 in)
- Track, front/rear: 0.920 m (36.2 in)/0 m.
- Weight, empty/full load: 210 kg (460 lb)/360 kg (790 lb).
- Fuel consumption: 3.7 L/100 km (76.3 mpg_{‑imp}; 63.6 mpg_{‑US})
- Top speed: 80 km/h (50 mph)
- Years built: 1953 to 1955
- Number built: 15,000 (19,668 from another source)
- Price : DM 2,100.00

== See also ==
- Canopy door
- List of motorized trikes
