= Norbert Riedel =

German engineer (1912–1963)

Norbert Riedel (* 1 April 1912 in Jägerndorf, Sudetenland, then Austria-Hungary; † 24 February 1963 in Zürs am Arlberg, Austria) was an engineer and entrepreneur.

== Life ==
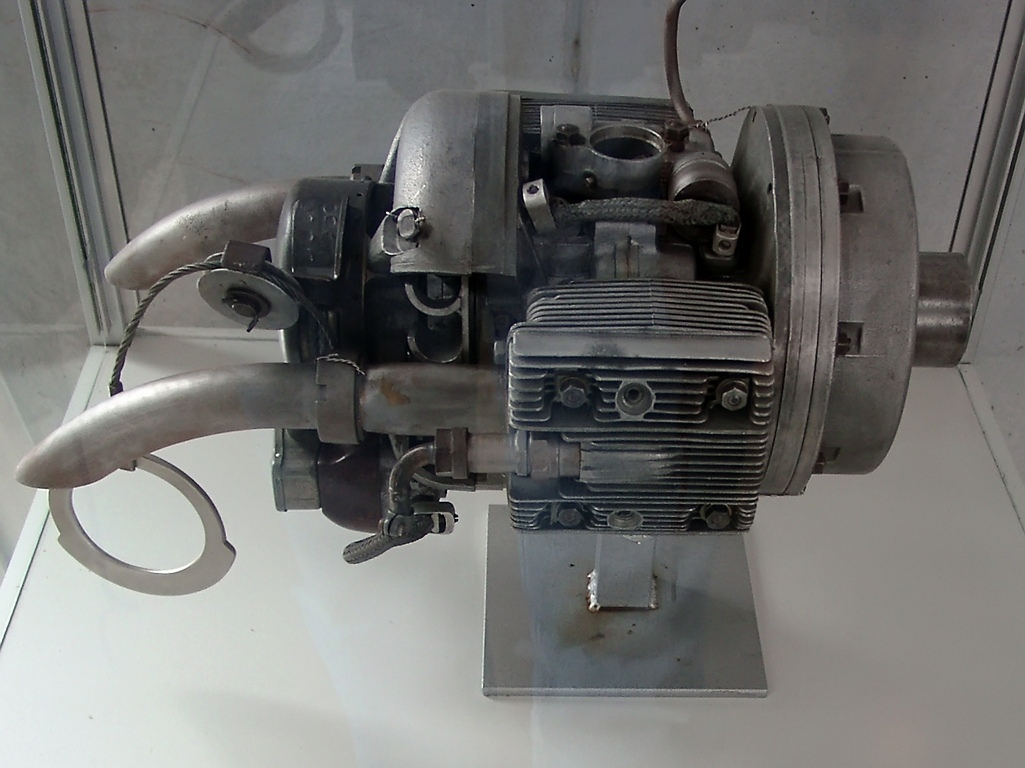
Riedel starter

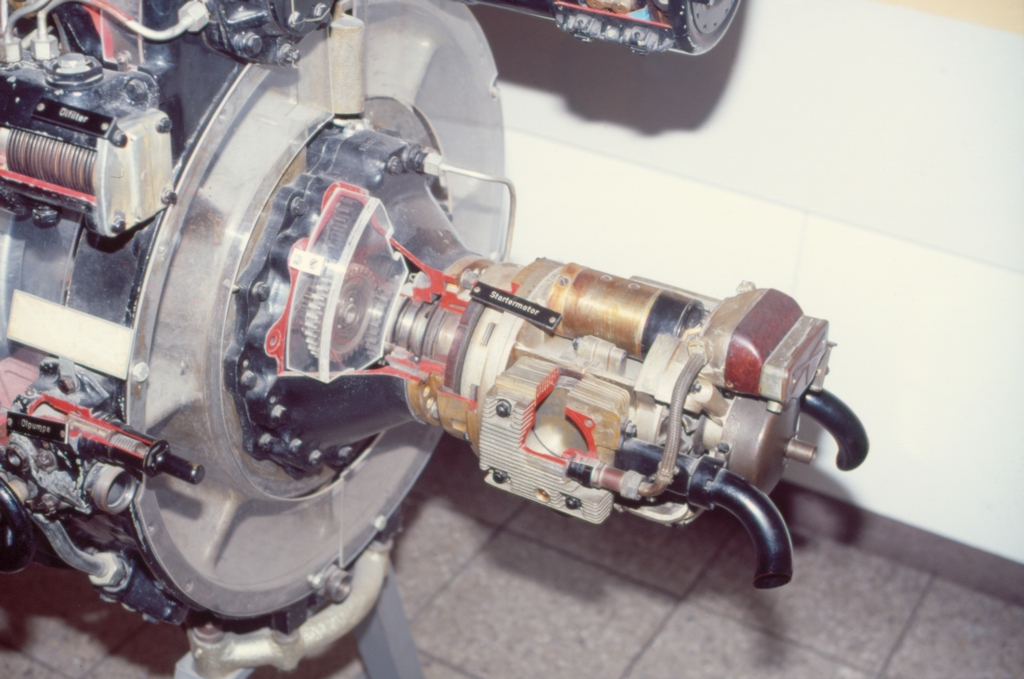
Riedel APU fitted on a BMW 003

Riedel studied mechanical engineering and worked in the 1930s, first with Ardie and then at Victoria. During the Second World War, he developed a starter engine ("Riedel starter") for the first German jet engine-powered combat aircraft's powerplants. The starter system, which consisted of a Riedel 10 hp (7.5 kW) two-stroke flat engine hidden in the intake, essentially functioned as a pioneering example of an auxiliary power unit (APU) for starting a jet engine. A hole in the extreme nose of the centrebody contained a manual pull-handle (except for the BMW 003 engine) which started the piston engine, which in turn rotated the compressor. Two small petrol tanks were fitted in the annular intake. The engine was considered an extreme short stroke (bore / stroke: 70 mm / 35 mm = 2:1) design so it could fit in the hub of the turbine compressor. For reduction it had an integrated planetary gear. It was produced in Victoria in Nuremberg and served as a starter for the operational German Junkers Jumo 004 and BMW 003 jet engines, placed on the centreline of each of these, and was also meant for use on the Heinkel HeS 011 experimental jet engine, but relocated above the intake passage within a Heinkel-designed prefabricated sheet metal component instead.

In 1947, he founded the Riedel Motoren AG in Immenstadt, where he designed the light motorcycle Imme R100 which was manufactured in series. By the end of 1951 12,000 units were built. In December 1949, Riedel began design work for the scooter Till Riedel, however due to the insolvency of Riedel Motoren AG did not go into production in October 1951. In development was also an Imme with a two-cylinder engine.

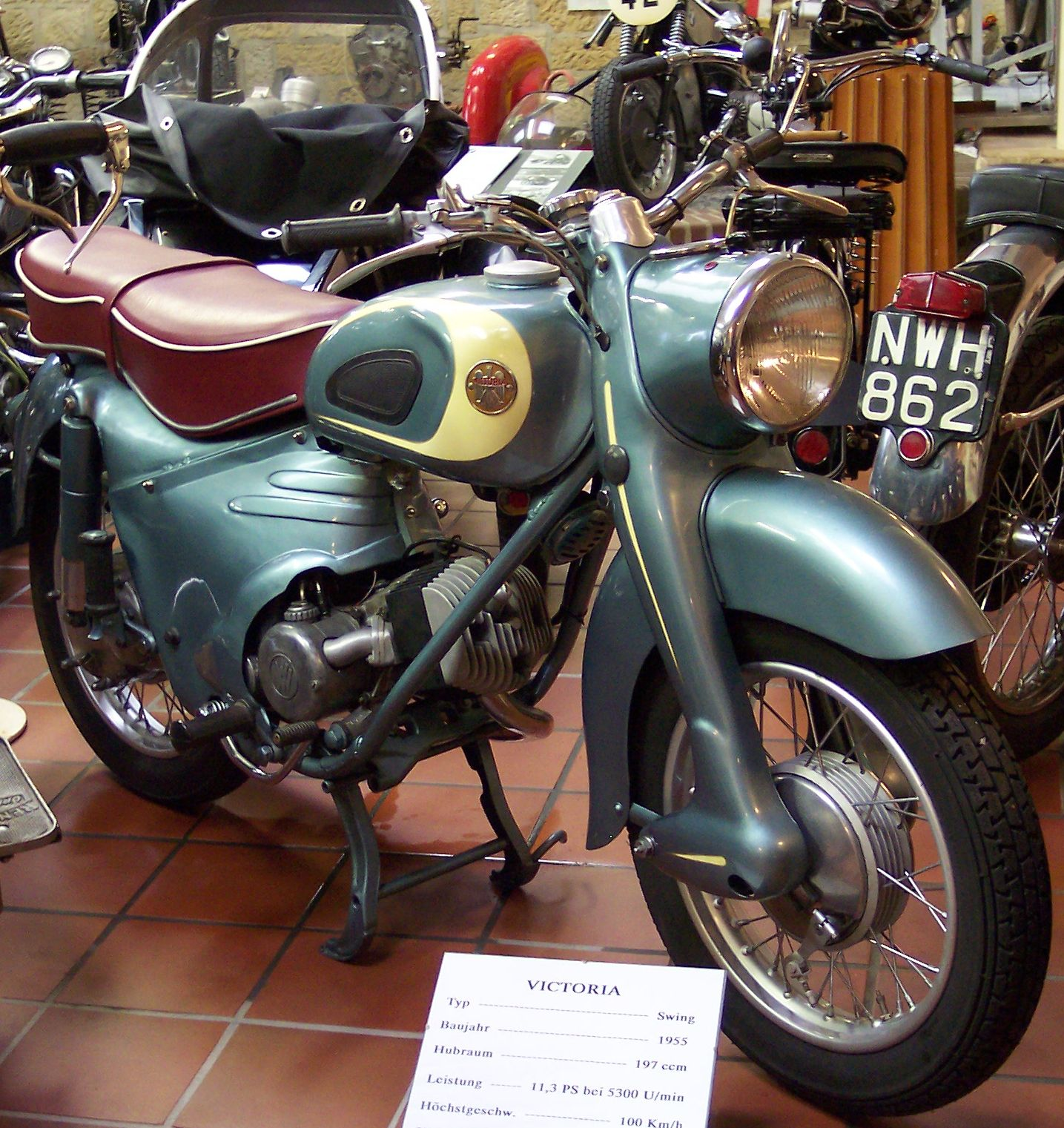
Victoria Swing 200 (1955)

After the bankruptcy of Riedel Motoren AG he went back to Victoria, where he developed the models Victoria Swing and the 200 cc two-stroke scooter Victoria Peggy. The "Peggy" was provided with a novel electromagnetic pushbutton circuit, electric starter, fan cooling and a propulsion unit swingarm. Also, the swing was equipped with the pushbutton circuit.

Norbert Riedel died in 1963 in an avalanche.
