= Fend Flitzer =

Three-wheeled scooter from the German manufacturer Fend

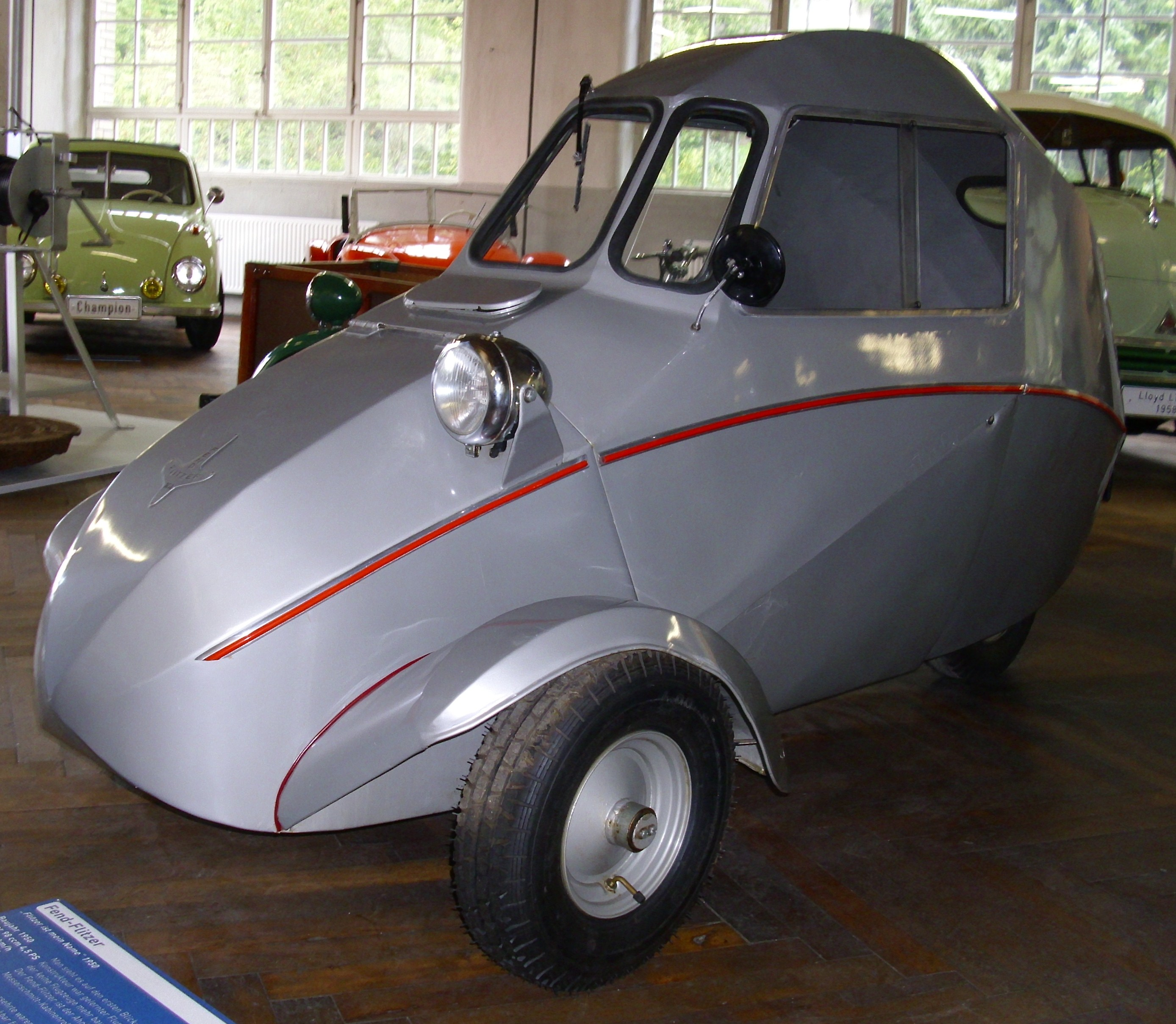
1950 Fend Flitzer 101

The Fend Flitzer was a three-wheeled invalid carriage designed and built by Fritz Fend. The Flitzer established many of the basic concepts on which Fend's later Messerschmitt Kabinenroller microcars were developed.

== Background ==
In 1948, Fend, a former aeronautical engineer and technical officer in the Luftwaffe, began production of a tricycle invalid carriage in his workshop in Rosenheim, Germany. The tricycle had a front wheel that was steered by handlebars and powered by a mechanism actuated by pushing back and forth on the handlebars. Shortly afterward, it was offered with a 38 cc (2.3 cu in) Victoria two-stroke proprietary engine normally used for motorizing bicycles.

Fend then designed the Flitzer, a larger, better-enclosed invalid carriage. It was designed from the start to be powered by a gasoline engine. Whereas the earlier tricycle was both steered and powered by a single front wheel, the Flitzer had a pair of front wheels linked to the steering mechanism and a powered rear wheel.

== Specifications and development ==
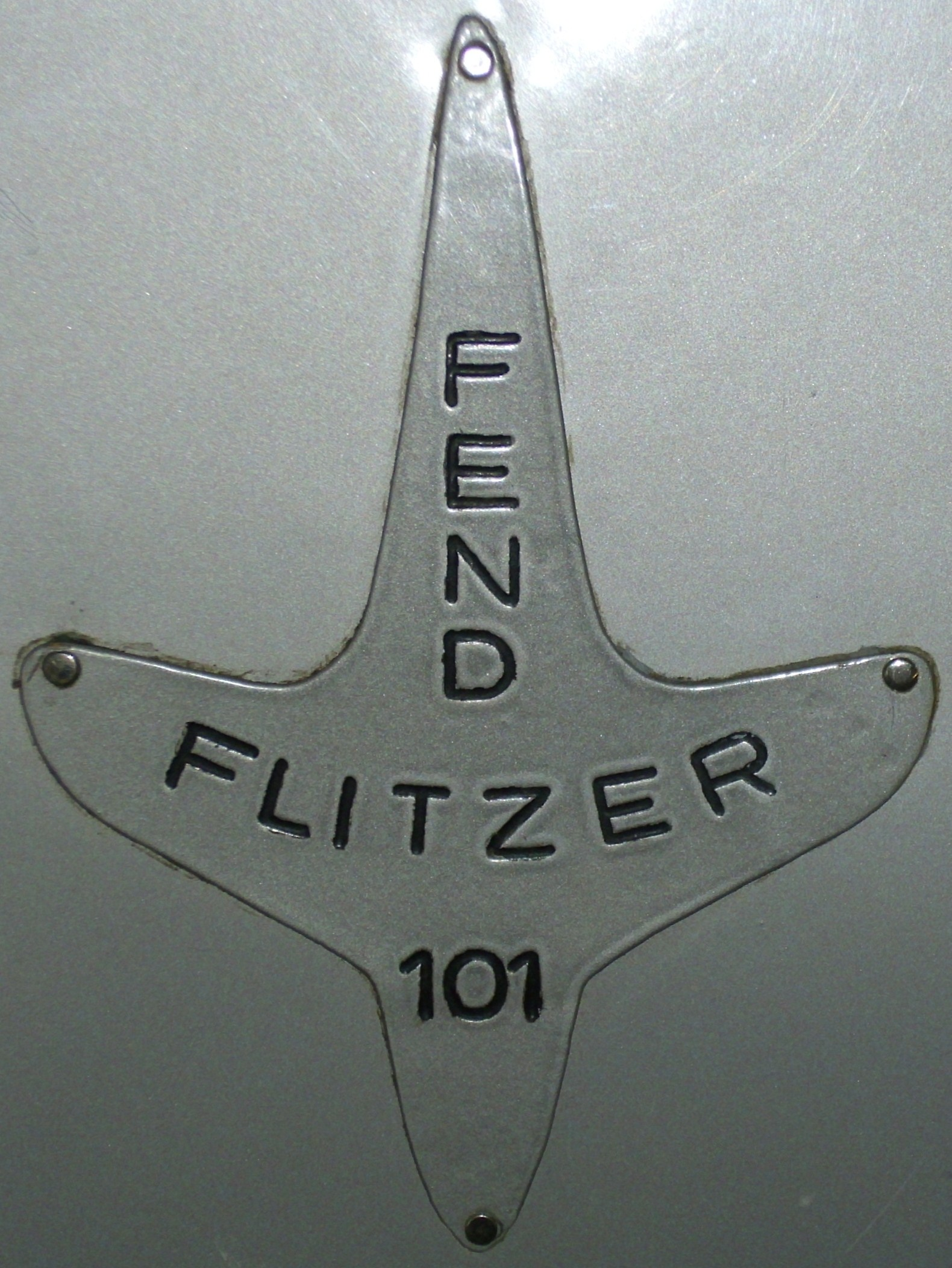
Flitzer 101 emblem

The Flitzer was made with aluminium panels over a steel frame and was enclosed at the front, sides, and back. It had a hatch at the top that was hinged at the front and tilted forward for the operator to get in. The first version of the Flitzer was open, with a hole and a windshield in the hatch for the operator's head and shoulders to stick through and be protected from the wind. Flitzers made from September 1948 to 1950 were powered by a 98 cc (6.0 cu in) Fichtel & Sachs two-stroke engine. Suspension was by rubber springs loaded in torsion.

In 1950 the engine was changed to a 100 cc (6.1 cu in) Riedel/Imme. By 1951, in response to customer requests for passenger-carrying capability, a scooter-type saddle was placed above the rear enclosure with footrests on either side of the body. A closed version, on which the hatch had an enclosure that covered the operator, was made available. The enclosure included the windshield and side windows.

== Reception and legacy ==
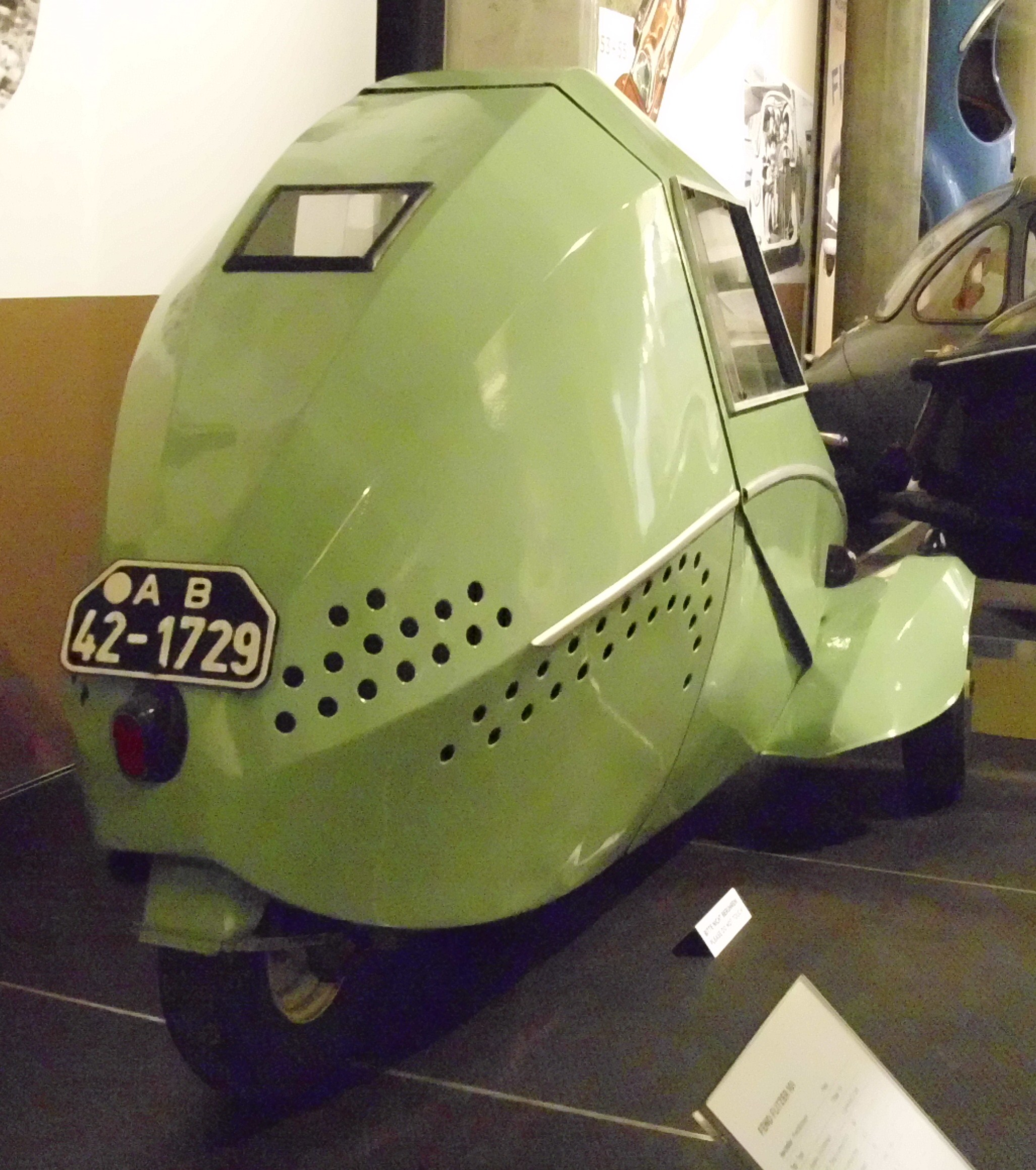
Right rear view of a Flitzer 101

About 250 Flitzers had been built when production stopped in 1951. Many of these invalid carriages had been bought by able-bodied individuals seeking basic personal transport. This led Fend to believe that there would be a mass market for a larger, transport-oriented version of the Flitzer. Fend began to design and develop a two-seat vehicle similar in concept to the Flitzer. He also began looking for a manufacturer to mass-produce this vehicle. He came to an agreement with Messerschmitt for them to build Fend vehicles in their factory at Regensburg Part of the agreement was that the cars carried the Messerschmitt name, with Fend's new design being designated the Messerschmitt KR175.
