= Fritz Fend =

German aeronautical engineer (1920–2000)

Fritz Fend (April 14, 1920 in Rosenheim – November 22, 2000) was an aeronautical engineer. He was noted for designing Messerschmitt's Kabinenroller (scooter with cabin) KR175 and KR200 microcars, for co-founding FMR, the company that took over production of the Kabinenrollers in 1956, and for designing the FMR Tg500, a sports microcar based on the Kabinenroller. Fend continued his career as an inventor and designer after the KR200 ended production. Fend was working on another lightweight vehicle project shortly before his death.

== Rosenheim workshop ==
After the Second World War, Fend, who had been a technical officer with the Luftwaffe, opened a workshop in Rosenheim, Germany. In 1948, he devised an invalid carriage in the form of a tricycle. The front wheel of the tricycle was powered by pushing the handlebars back and forth. Originally designed with bicycle wheels, it was redesigned with scooter wheels in order to make the carriage lower. Fend later made a version that was powered by a 38 cc (2.3 cu in) Victoria two-stroke engine.

=== Fend Flitzer ===
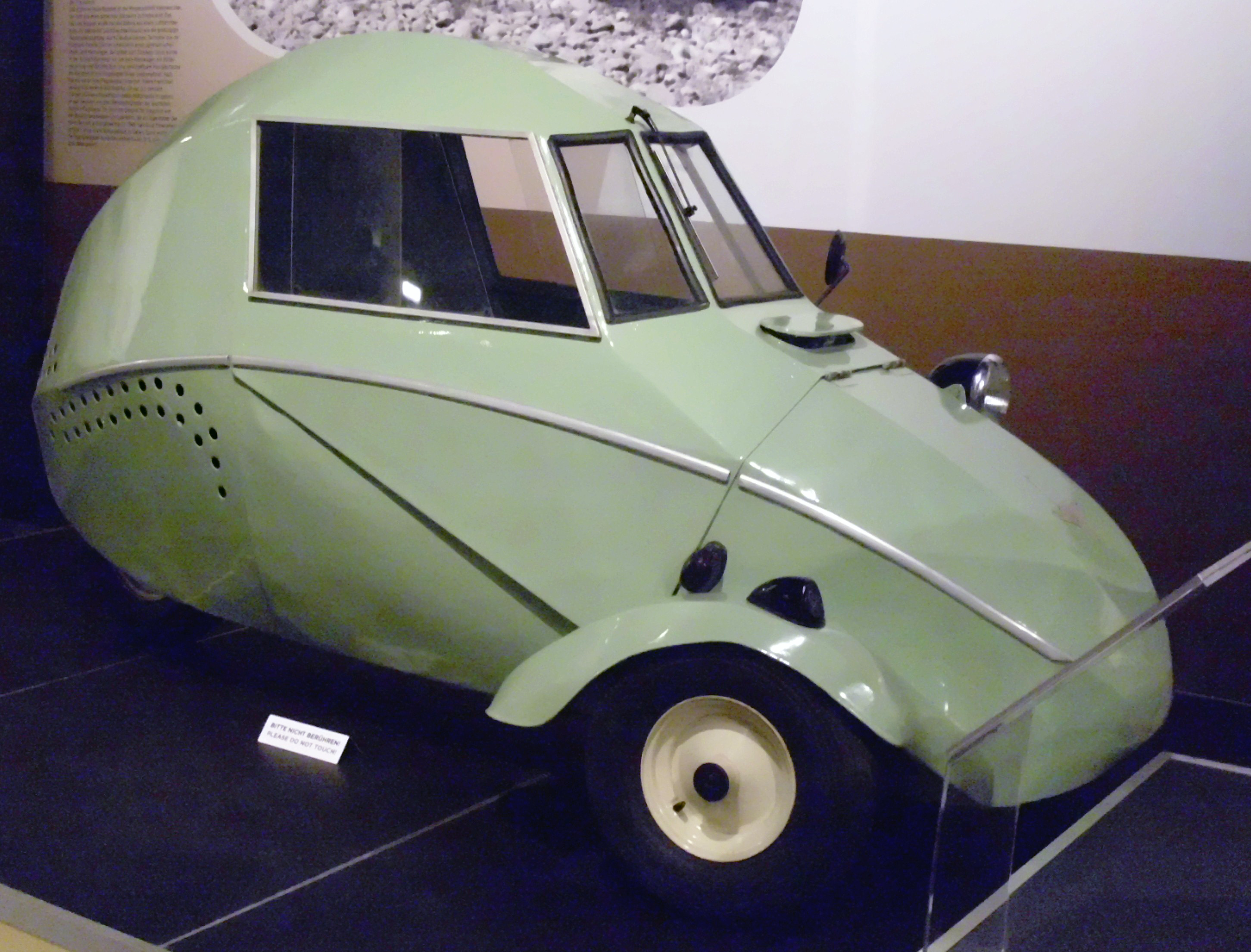
Fend Flitzer 101

Fend then designed and built the Fend Flitzer, an invalid carriage designed from the start to be powered by an engine. He reversed the layout of his original tricycle, giving the Flitzer two front wheels and one rear wheel. As with usual convention, the front wheels were steered while the rear wheel was powered. About 250 Flitzers were built between 1948 and the end of production in 1951.

=== Utility vehicles ===
In addition to the invalid carriages, Fend designed and built the Fend Lastenroller, a three-wheeled forecar moped with a cargo platform or trunk between the front wheels.

== Messerschmitt ==
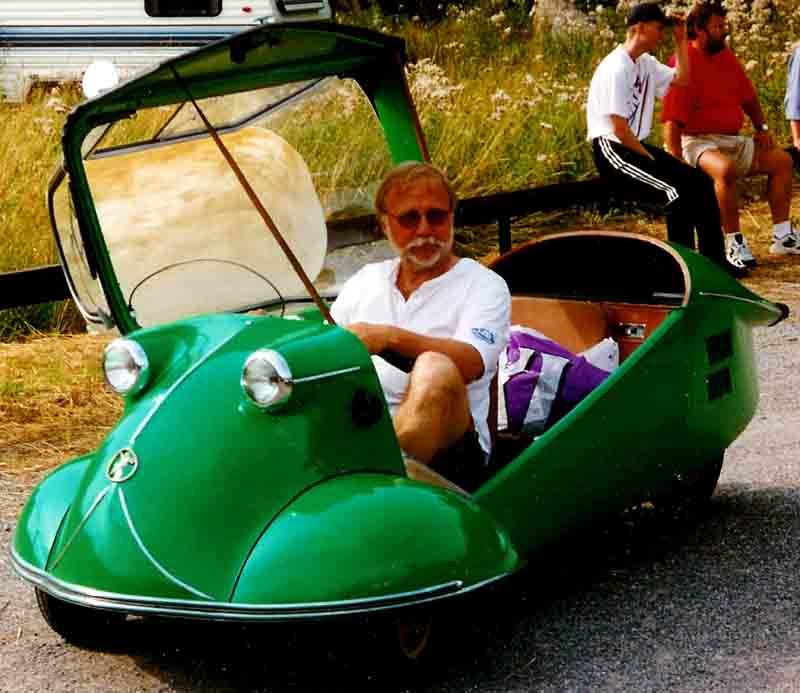
1954 Messerschmitt KR175

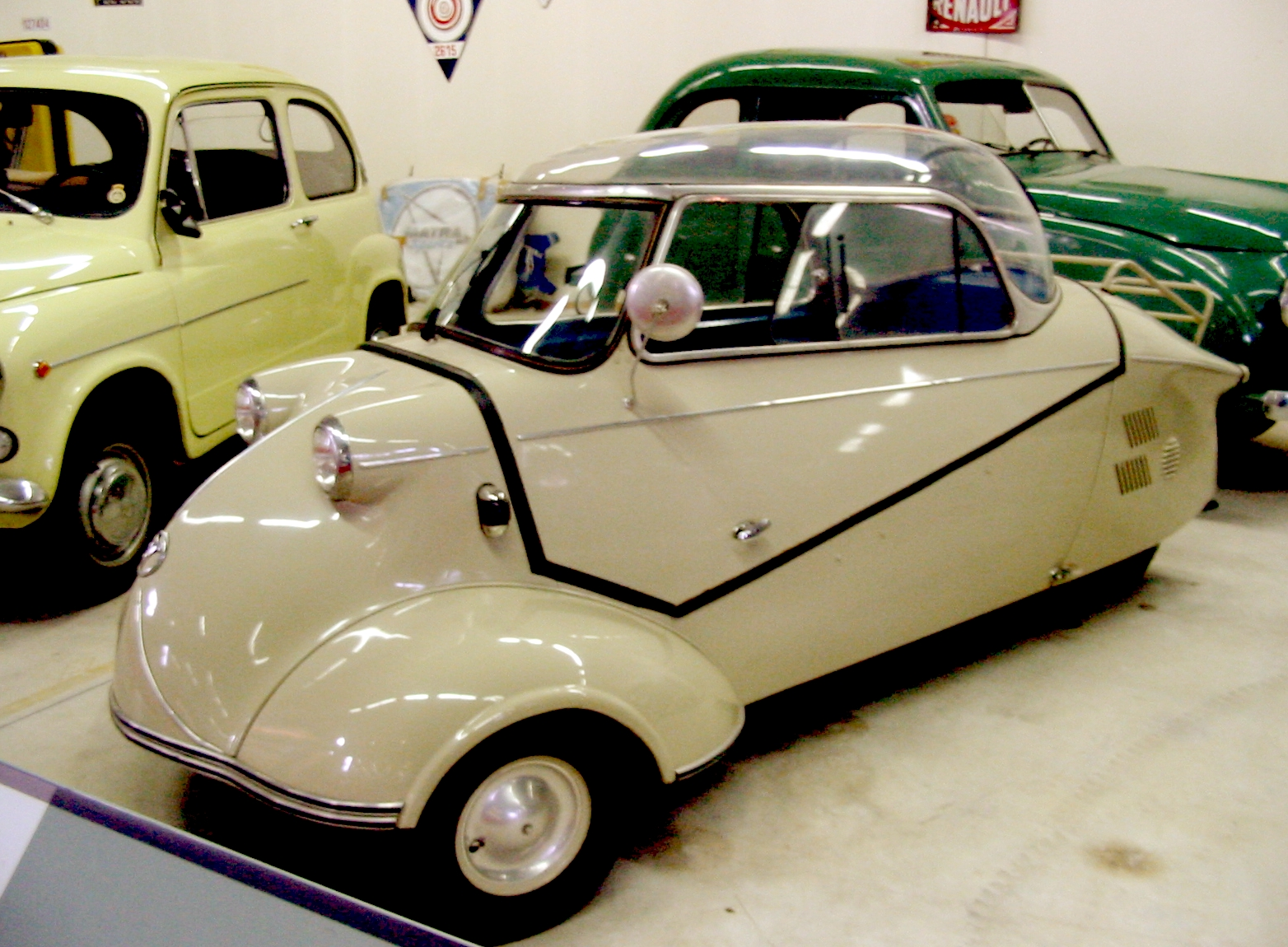
1955 Messerschmitt KR200

Many Flitzer buyers were not invalids but healthy people seeking basic personal transportation. This led Fend to design the Fend 150, a larger, two-passenger car based on the concepts of the Flitzer. With mass production in mind, Fend approached Willy Messerschmitt with a proposal for Messerschmitt AG to build a more developed version of the Fend 150.

Messerschmitt, needing products to build to keep his factories working, accepted the Fend 150, which was still being developed, and the Lastenroller, which was put into production.

=== KR175 ===
The development of the Fend 150 led to the production of the Messerschmitt KR175, which began in February 1953. Development continued after production began, resulting in 70 modifications of the design by June 1953. However, the KR175's excellent road manners and relative lack of width made it a good city commuter.

=== KR200 ===
In 1955, Messerschmitt replaced the KR175 with the KR200. Apart from a larger engine, the KR175 was almost completely re-engineered to produce the Kr200, new suspension(introducing shock absorbers to the design), new floor construction, improved engine mounting, larger tires, improved controls, and a means by which to reverse the car. Reverse was accomplished not by including a reverse gear in the transmission but by reversing the rotation of the engine itself.

KR200 production expanded to three models in 1957 with the introduction of the "Kabrio" convertible and the KR201 Roadster.

Production of the KR200 was heavily reduced in 1962 and ceased in 1964

== FMR ==
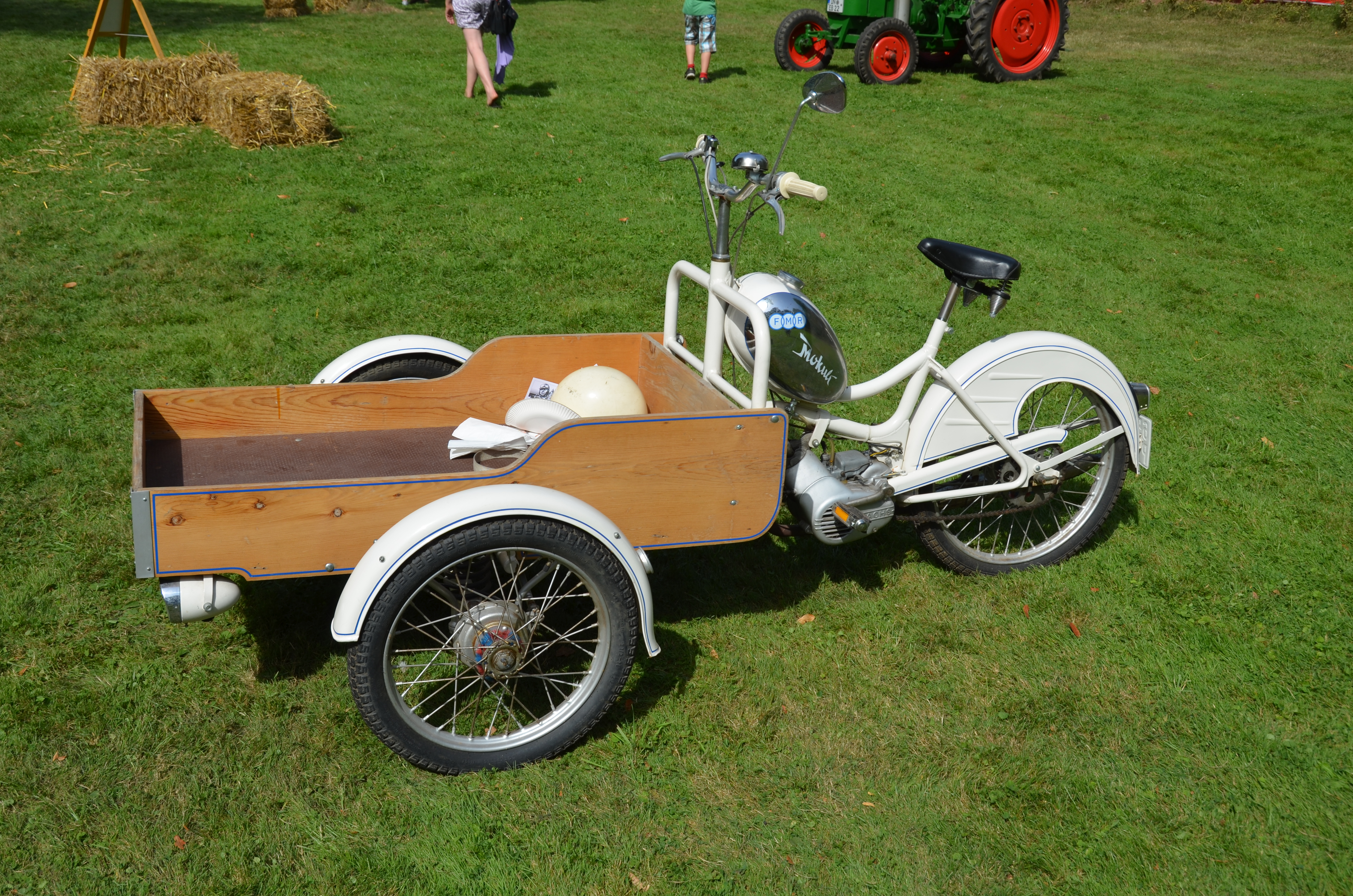
FMR Mokuli 130

In 1956, Messerschmitt was allowed to manufacture aircraft again and lost interest in Fend's microcars. Messerschmitt sold the Regenburg works to Fend, who, with brake and hub supplier Valentin Knott, formed Fahrzeug- und Maschinenbau GmbH, Regensburg (FMR) to continue production of the KR200 and his other vehicles. FMR was allowed to continue using the Messerschmitt name and logo on the KR200. The Fend Lastenroller was developed into the FMR Mokuli, versions of which were manufactured by FMR until 1972, after which the production line was shipped of to Morocco. The Mokuli was originally capable of carrying 130 kg (287 lb) later versions thereof had stronger and smaller front wheels and either 200 or 250 kg (441 or 551 lb) capacities. The name is a portmanteau of moped and kuli (coolie).

=== Tg500 ===
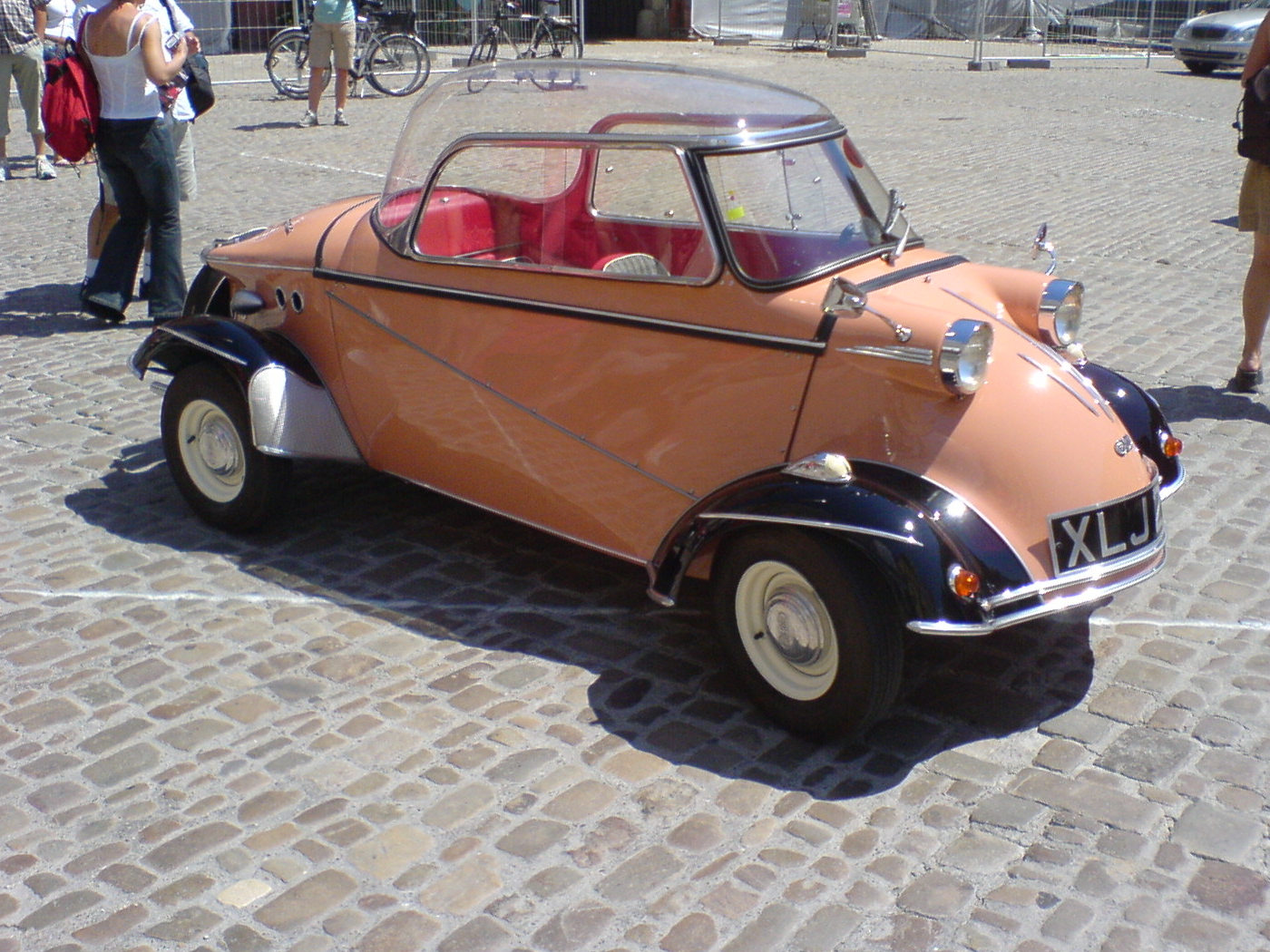
FMR Tg500

Fend developed the four-wheeled, twin-cylinder FMR Tg500 from the platform that had begun with the KR175. The front suspension, monocoque, and bodywork ahead of the rear sub-frame were derived from the KR200, but the rear sub-frame bore a newly designed suspension and drivetrain with twice the number of wheels and an engine with twice the number of cylinders and more than twice the displacement. The Tg500 was aimed primarily at sporting enthusiasts and was built from 1958 to 1961. About 320 were made.

== After FMR ==
Fritz Fend left FMR after they stopped building the KR200. Fend continued his career as a technical designer and an inventor. He invented an alarm that went on if the key was removed from a car ignition while the lights were still on, a feature that became popular after his patent ran out.

=== Last project and death ===
In the 1990s, Fend began working on the F2000, a modern low-weight low-drag vehicle reminiscent of the Kabinenroller. The project had reached the prototype stage, and a four-wheeled vehicle was built. The project ended when Fend died on 22 November 2000 after a massive stroke.
