= FMR Tg500 =

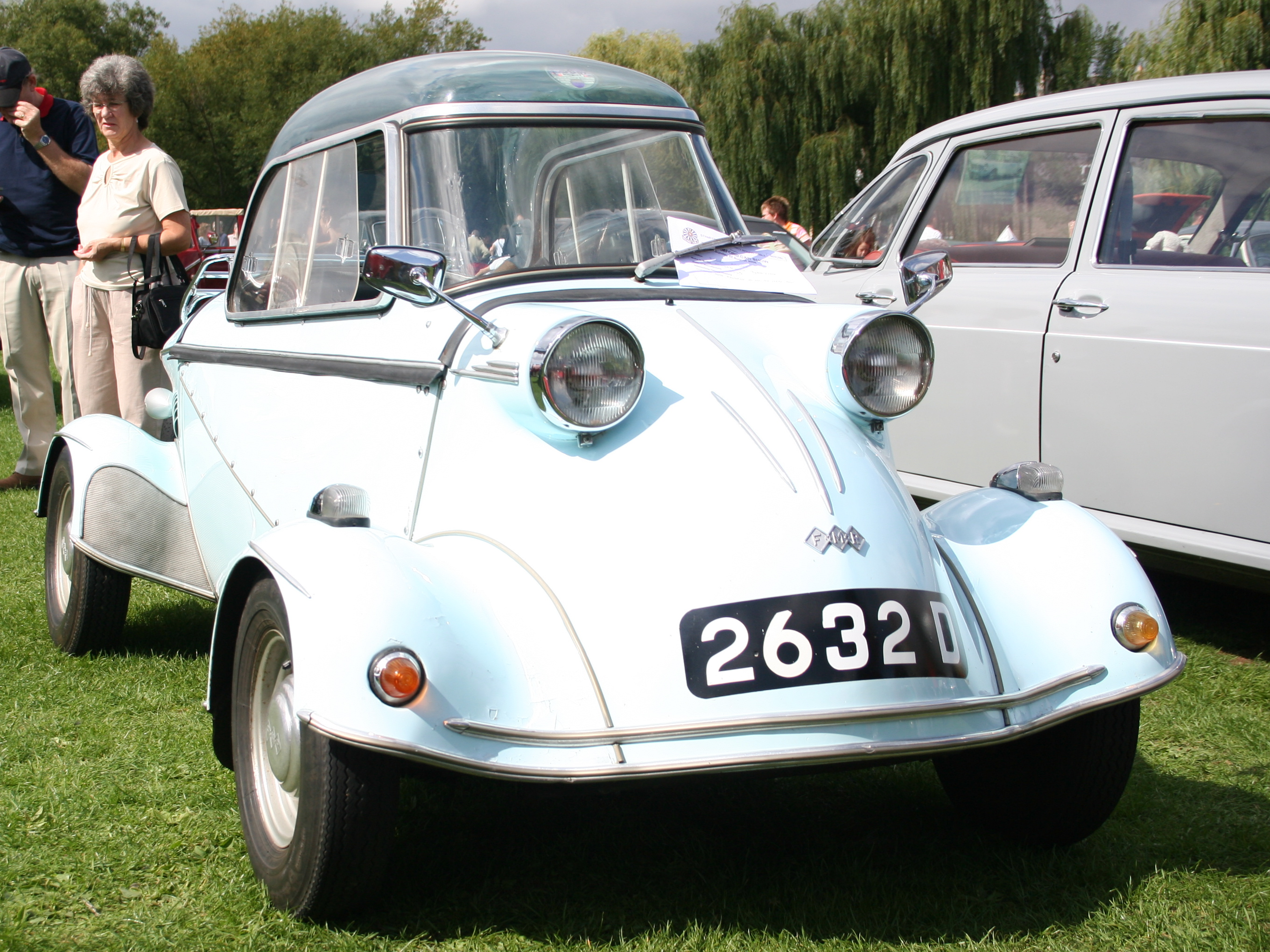

Overview
- Manufacturer: Fahrzeug- und Maschinenbau GmbH, Regensburg (FMR), Regensburg, Germany
- Also called: Tiger
- Production: 1958-1961; 320 made
- Designer: Fritz Fend

Body and chassis
- Class: Microcar
- Body style: bubble-top coupé, convertible, or roadster; two seats in tandem.
- Layout: RR layout
- Platform: Messerschmitt Kabinenroller

Powertrain
- Engine: See engine infobox below
- Power output: 20 hp (15 kW)
- Transmission: 4-speed plus reverse, unsynchronized

Dimensions
- Wheelbase: 1.88 m (74.2 in)
- Length: 3.00 m (118.1 in)
- Width: 1.27 m (50.0 in)
- Height: 1.24 m (49.0 in)
- Curb weight: 858 lb (389 kg)

The FMR Tg500 is a sports car built by Fahrzeug- und Maschinenbau GmbH, Regensburg (FMR) from 1958 to 1961. Based on the Messerschmitt Kabinenroller, which otherwise was a platform for three-wheelers, the Tg500 was a four-wheeled car with a two-stroke straight-two engine. FMR had taken over production of the KR200 from Messerschmitt in 1956. While the KR200 still used the Messerschmitt name and logo, the Tg500 was badged as an FMR.

"Tg" unofficially stood for Tiger. The "Tiger" name was claimed in Germany by Krupp, who used it on one of their trucks. There was also a Panhard Dyna Z Tiger at the same time.

== Features ==
The Tg500 incorporated several features from the Kabinenroller platform on which it was based, including the narrow body with tandem seating, the transparent acrylic bubble canopy, the low stance, and the direct steering.

=== Tandem seating ===
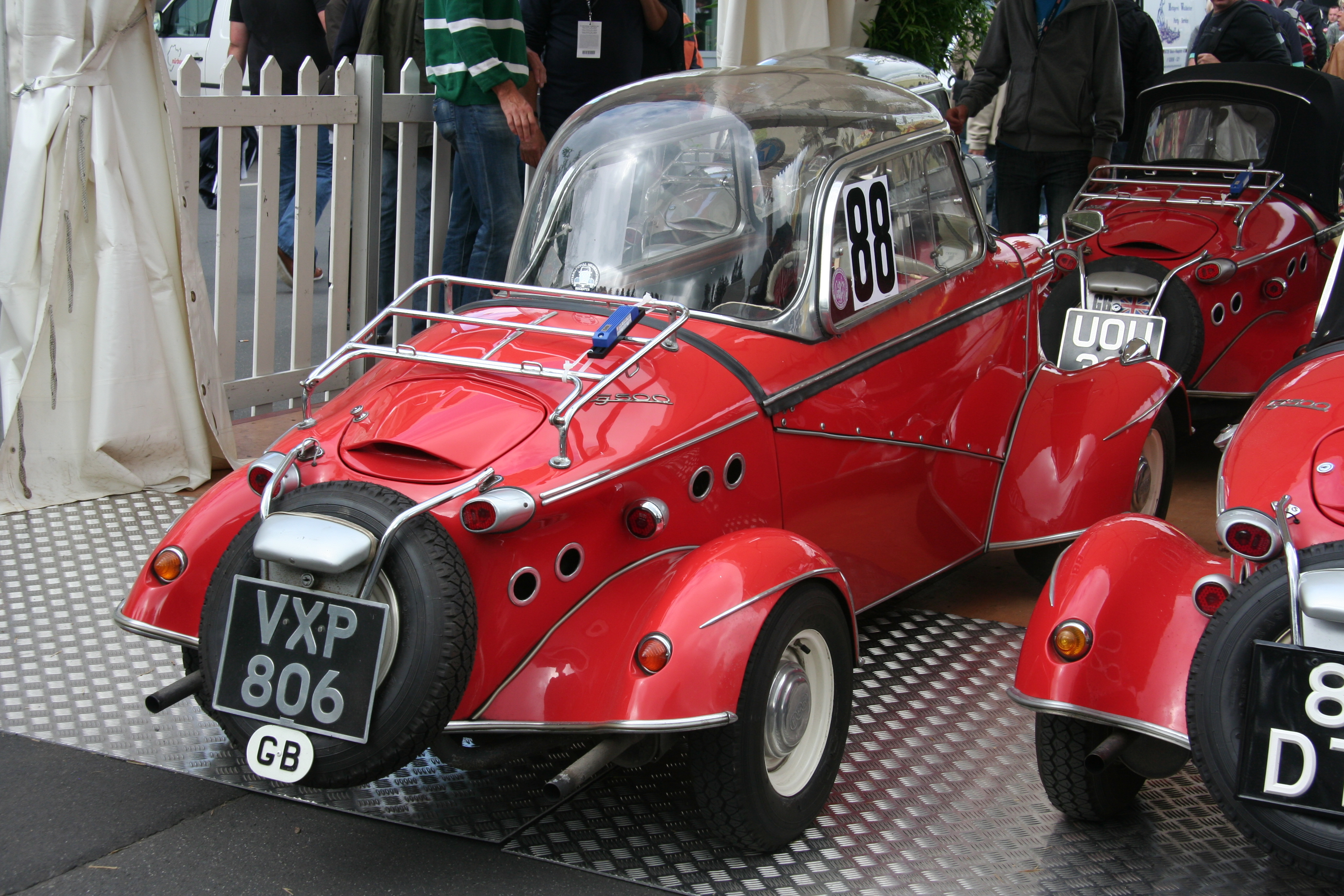
Rear view of Tg500s

The narrow body, and corresponding low frontal area, was achieved with tandem seating, which also allowed the body to taper like an aircraft fuselage, within a practical length. The tandem seating also centralized the mass of the car along the longitudinal axis which, combined with the low center of gravity, low weight, and wheel placement at the vehicle's extremes, gave the Tg500 good handling characteristics. A more minor advantage of tandem seating was that it made a mirrored export version to countries that drive on the left superfluous.

The center of gravity of the car was at the rear seat, which meant that the presence or absence of a passenger did not change the handling characteristics of the car.

=== Bubble canopy ===
Except for the Sports Roadster model, entry to the Tg500 was through a canopy door hinged on the right side of the vehicle. The door included both the windows (windshield, window frames on all but the Roadster models, folding top on Roadster and Kabrio models, and acrylic bubble on other versions) and the frame in which it was set, extending from the right side of the monocoque tub to the left. On Sport Roadster models, the canopy was fixed and there was neither a top nor any windows at all, only a tonneau cover. The bubble top on the Tg500 was the same as the one used on the KR200.

=== Engine and transmission ===
FMR 500 L
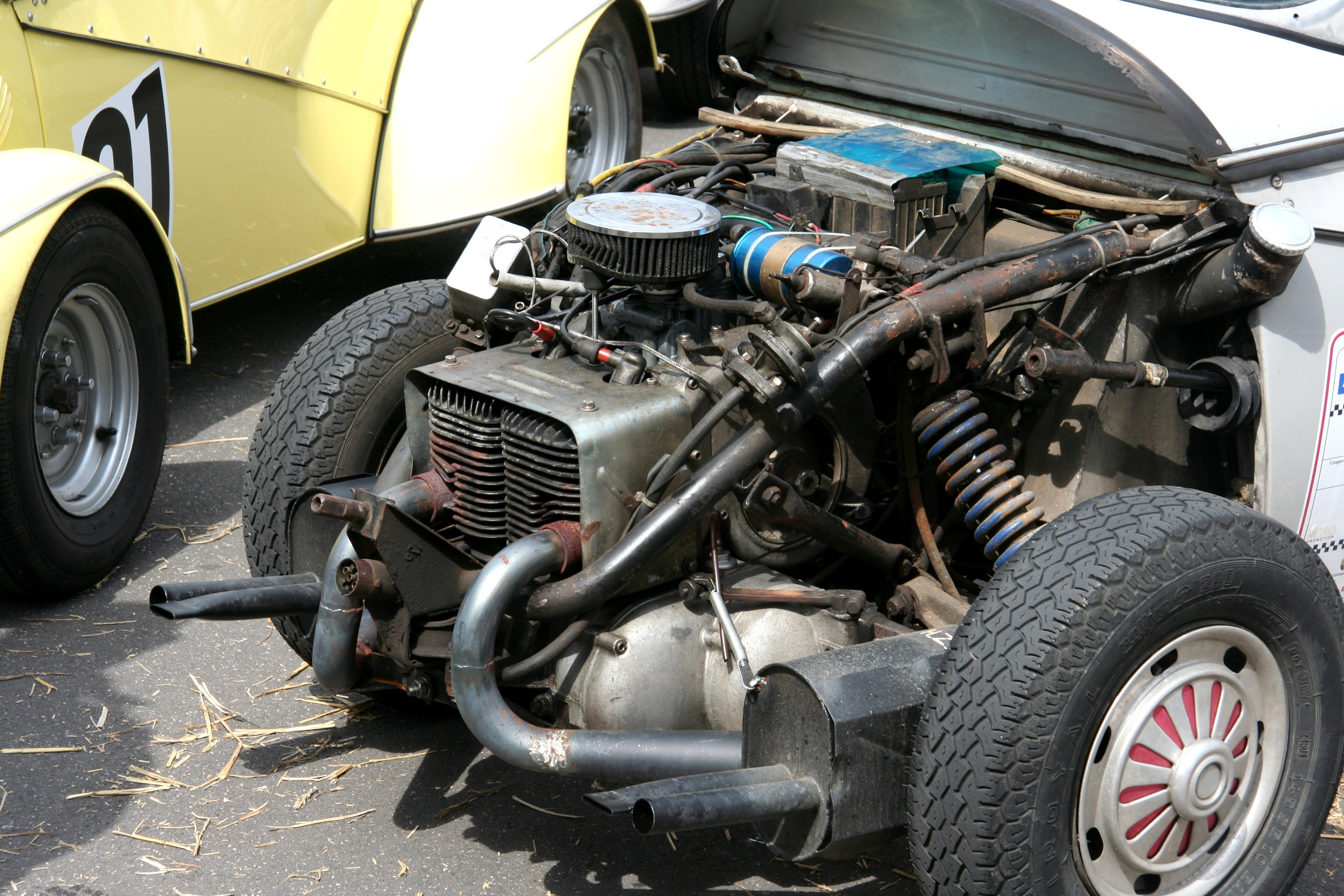
- Tg500 engine and rear suspension

Overview
- Manufacturer: Fahrzeug- und Maschinenbau GmbH, Regensburg (FMR) (designed by Fichtel & Sachs)
- Production: 1958-1961

Layout
- Configuration: Straight-twin engine
- Displacement: 0.5 L; 30.1 cu in (493 cc)
- Cylinder bore: 67 mm (2.638 in)
- Piston stroke: 70 mm (2.756 in)
- Valvetrain: Piston-ported two-stroke
- Compression ratio: 6.5:1

Combustion
- Fuel system: Bing downdraft 28 mm carburettor
- Fuel type: Two-stroke petrol-oil mixture
- Oil system: Petrol/oil mixture: 30:1 for a new engine 40:1 after broken in
- Cooling system: air, one induction fan per cylinder

Output
- Power output: 19.5 PS (14.3 kW; 19.2 hp) at 5000 rpm
- Torque output: 33.2 N⋅m (24.5 ft⋅lb) at 4000 rpm

The Tg500 ran on a 494 cc (30.1 cu in) air-cooled two-cylinder two-stroke engine positioned transversely over the rear wheels. The engine, designed by Fichtel & Sachs, was built by FMR. The Dynastart starter/generator unit was belt driven, and had a fan at each end of the unit, one to cool each cylinder of the engine. Unlike the KR175 or the KR200, the Tg500 had a reverse gear in its transmission, which was part of a transaxle unit.

=== Controls ===
The controls of the Tg500 were similar to those of the KR200 except for the Tg500's single starting mode for the engine and its H-pattern gearshift with reverse gear and no auxiliary lever. A tachometer was offered as an optional replacement for the clock.

=== Suspension and brakes ===
Apart from the use of 4.40 x 10 tires all around and an increase in front track from 108 cm (43 in) to 111 cm (44 in), the front suspension and steering were the same as that on the KR200. The rear suspension was fully independent, with universal joints at both ends of each halfshaft, located by lower wishbones and coil springs with concentrically mounted shock absorbers.

Unlike the three-wheeled Kabinenrollers, which had cable-operated mechanical brakes, the Tg500 had hydraulic brakes.

== Performance ==
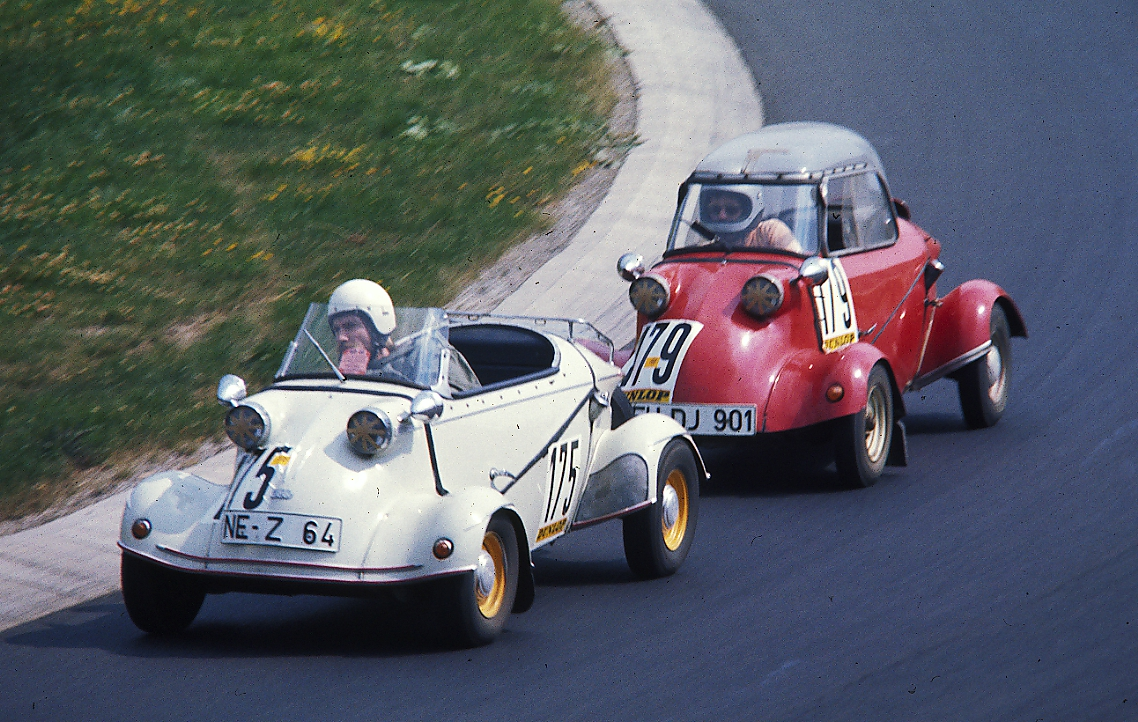
The four-wheeled FMR Tg500 at the Nürburgring in 1976

In stock form, the Tg500 accelerated from 0-60 mph (97 km/h) in 28 seconds and went on to a top speed of 78 mph (126 km/h). At a similar price, the first series of the Austin-Healey Sprite accelerated from rest to 60 mph (97 km/h) in 21 seconds and went on to a top speed of 82 mph (132 km/h).

== Data ==
- Heating/air conditioning: via exhaust heat exchanger / none
- Wheel size: 112 mm × 254 mm (4.40 in × 10 in)
- Weight, empty / full load: 350 / 560 kg (770 / 1,230 lb)
- Track, front / rear: 1.110 / 1.044 m (3 ft 7.7 in / 3 ft 5.1 in)
- Fuel consumption: 6.5 L/100 km (43 mpg_{‑imp}; 36 mpg_{‑US})
- Top speed: 126 km/h (78 mph)
- Time to 97 km/h (60 mph): 27.8 seconds
- Price: DM 3,650.00 (46% of an Austin-Healey Sprite)
