= Greek economic miracle =

1950-73 Greek period of rapid economic growth

The Greek economic miracle (Greek: Ελληνικό οικονομικό θαύμα) describes a period of rapid and sustained economic growth in Greece from 1950 to 1973. At its height, the Greek economy grew by an average of 7.7 percent, second in the world only to Japan.

== Background ==
From 1941 to 1944, Greece endured the devastating effects of World War II, including military invasion, occupation, and fierce fighting with Greek Resistance groups, which all caused unprecedented damage to the country's already-underdeveloped infrastructure and economy. Forced loans demanded by the occupying regime severely devalued the drachma to the point of hyperinflation in 1943 and 1944, while the end of the war gave way to a bitter civil war that lasted until 1949. By 1950, the relative position of the Greek economy had dramatically deteriorated: the income per capita in purchasing power terms fell from 62% of France's in 1938 to about 40% in 1949, a decade later.

== Economic growth ==
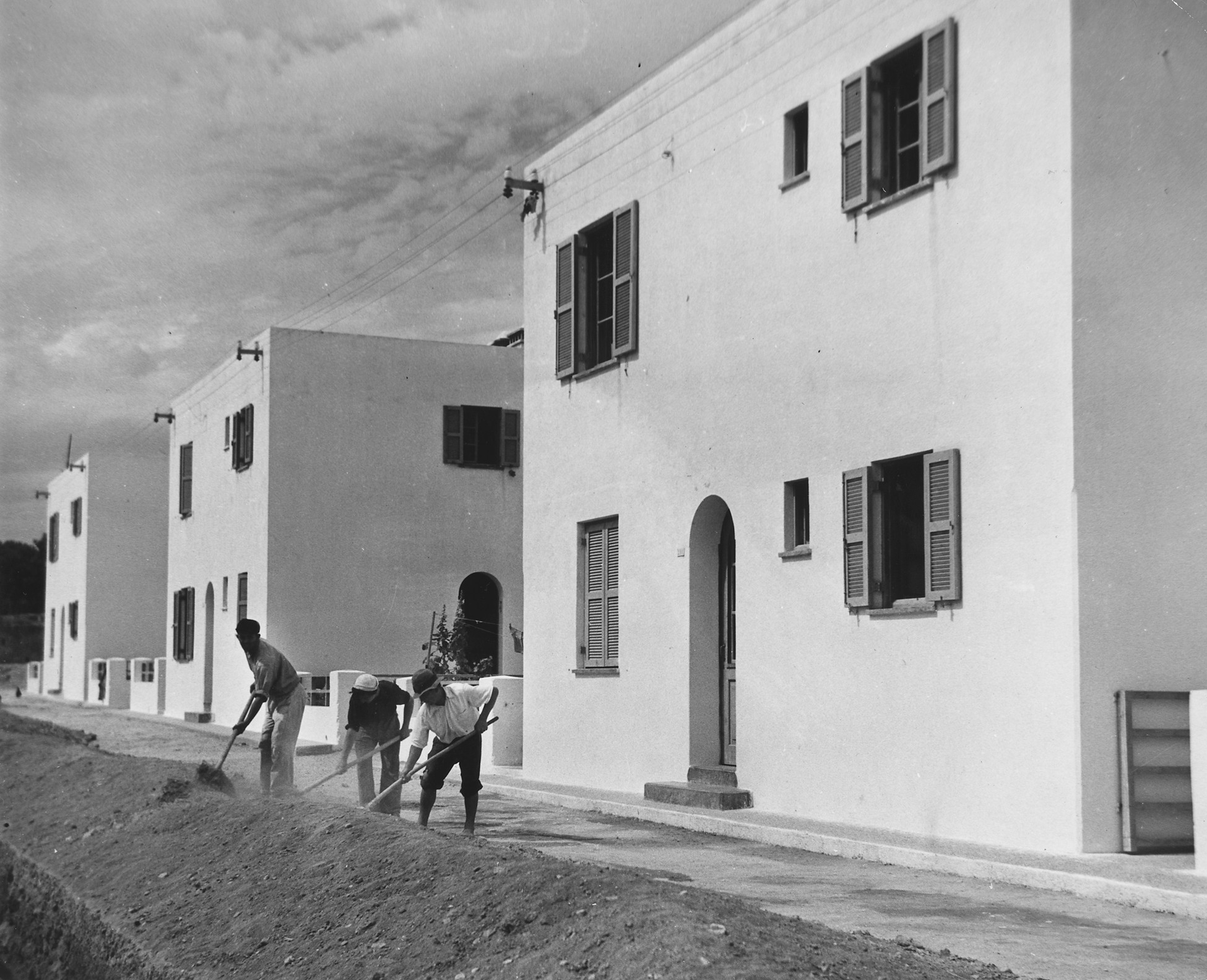
Workmen grade the street in front of new housing constructed with the help of Marshall Plan funds in Greece.

Archival video, created by the US Department of State, about Greece's reconstruction thanks to Marshall Plan aid.

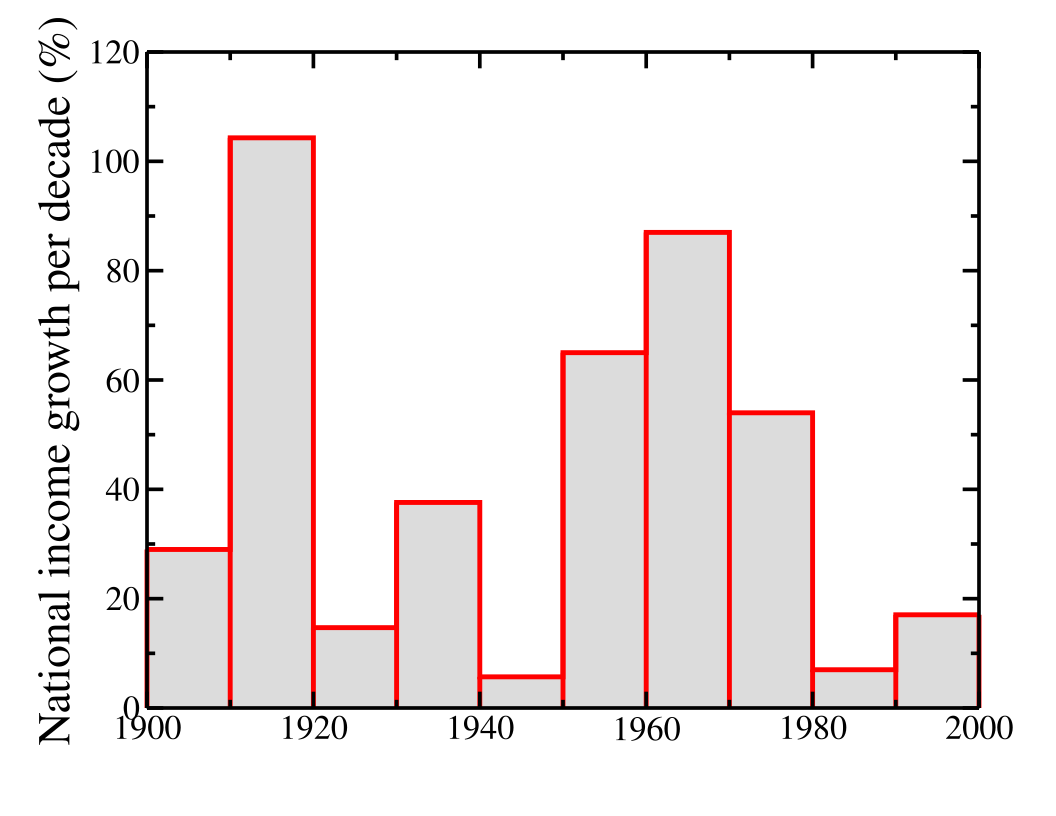
Greek National Income per decade for 1900–2000. During Karamanlis tenure, the national income increased significantly. Source: The Bank of Greece and National Statistical Service, various open source bulletins and reports.

Greece's recovery began almost immediately after the end of the Greek Civil War and is attributed to several factors, including economic and foreign policy and social and cultural changes. As in other European countries, a chief catalyst were the grants and loans of the Marshall Plan. Other factors include a drastic devaluation of the drachma, attraction of foreign investments, significant development of industrial activity (including chemicals, metals and other sectors of heavy industry), development of the services sector (especially tourism), and massive construction activity related to large infrastructure projects and the rebuilding of Greek cities. Greek political leaders such as prime minister Konstantinos Karamanlis and parliamentarians Georgios Kartalis and Spyros Markezinis are also credited with having stewarded increased investment.

Greek growth rates were highest during the 1950s, often exceeding 10%, close to those of a modern tiger economy. Industrial production also grew annually by 10% for several years, mostly in the 1960s.

Growth however greatly widened the economic gap between rich and poor, intensifying political divisions.. Karamanlis resigned in 1963, George Papandreou's center-left party won the elections in 1964 by a landslide and initiated a program of social reforms. In the summer of 1965 King Constantine II forced Papandreou to resign and the country entered a long period of political turmoil which finally led to a military dictatorship in 1967. In 1974 the junta collapsed following Turkey's invasion in Cyprus.

In total, the Greek GDP grew for 54 of the 60 years following World War II and the Greek Civil War.

== Aftermath ==
Marginal GDP contractions were recorded in the 1980s, although these were partly counterbalanced by the evolution of the Greek economy during that time. Between the early 1970s and 1990s, double-digit inflation, often closer to 20% than 10%, was normal until monetary policies were changed to comply with the criteria for joining the Eurozone.

== Gallery ==
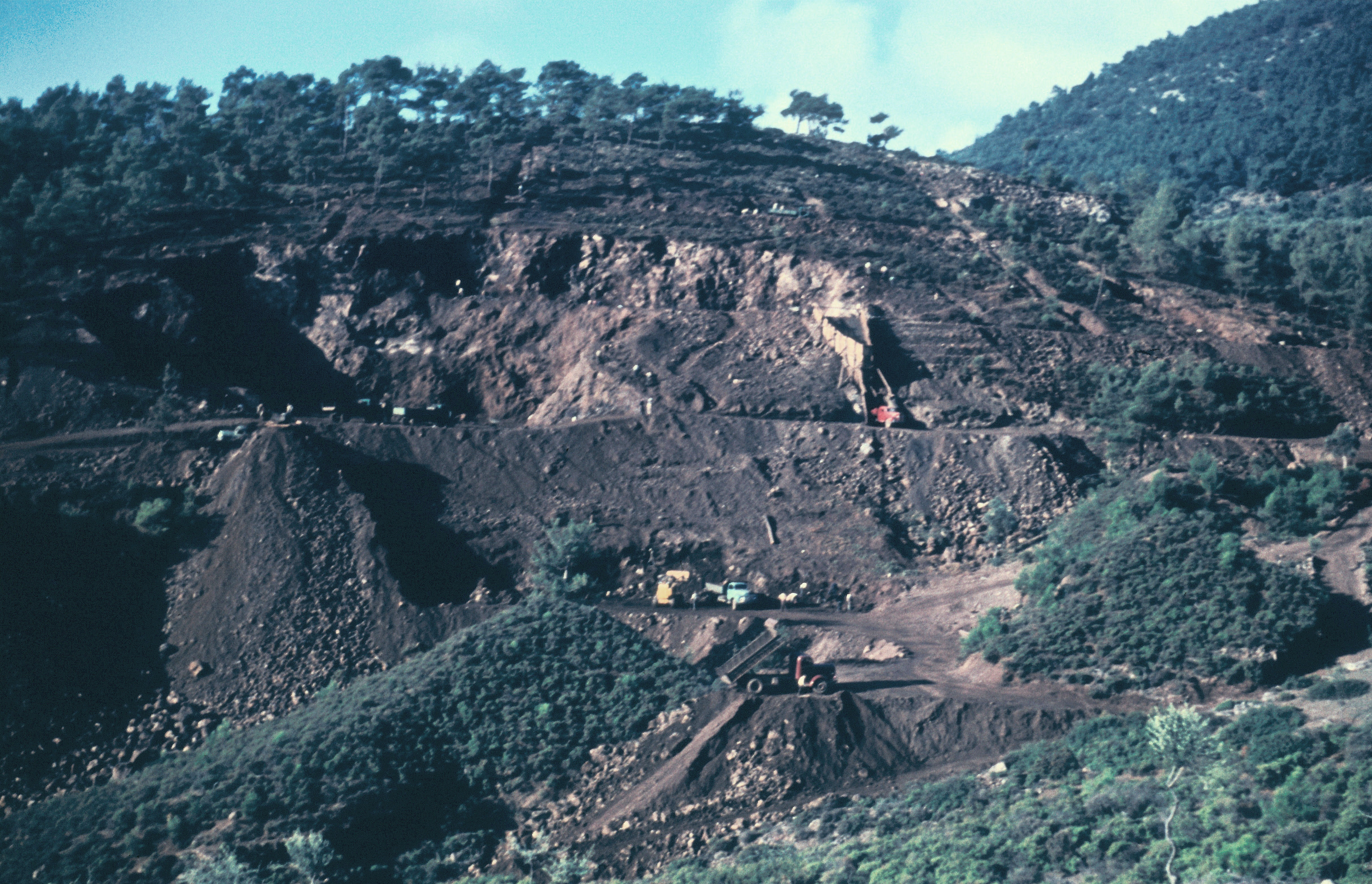
Iron ore mine in Thasos (1958)

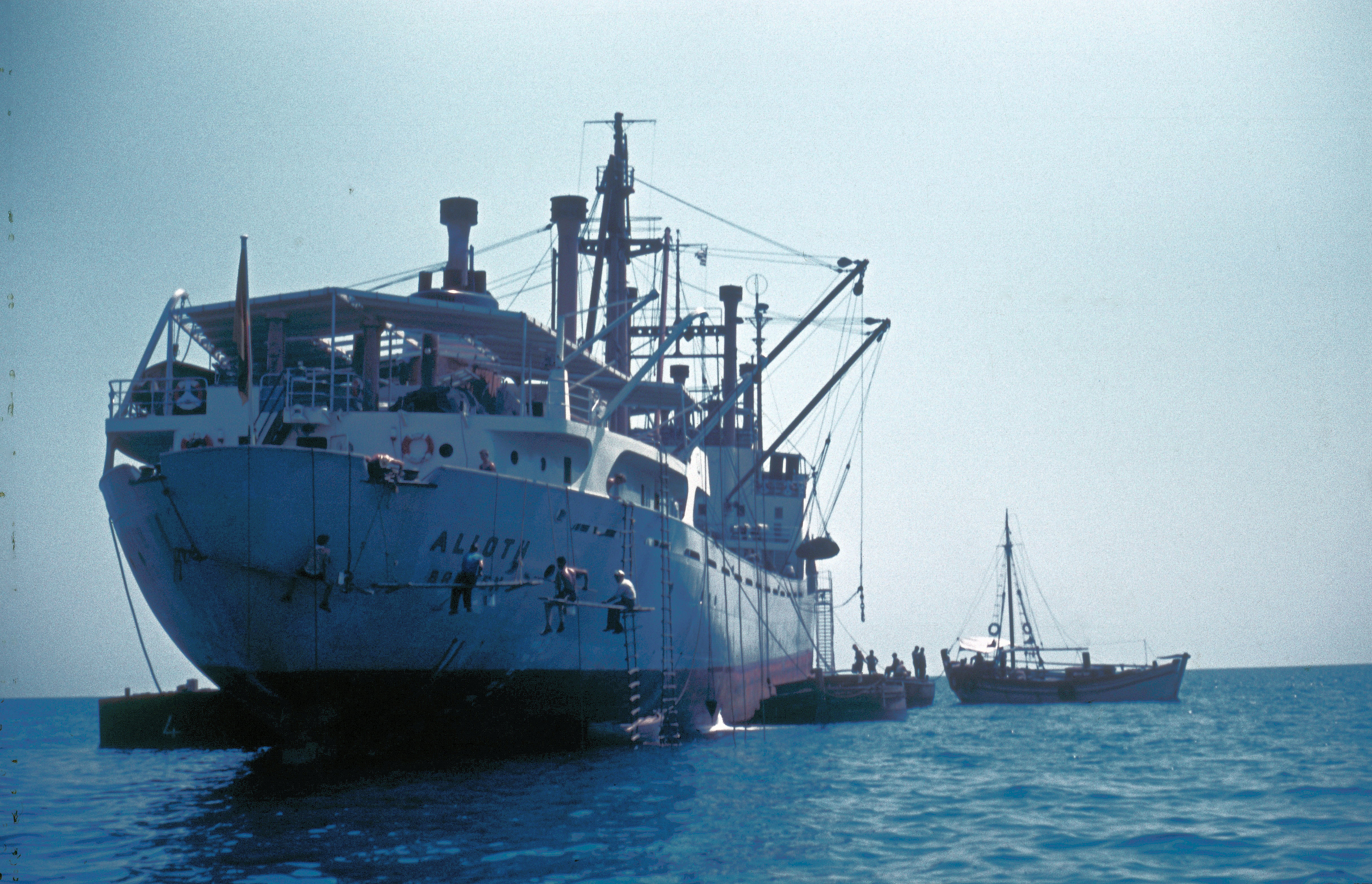
Shiploading in Limenaria, Thasos, during the 1950s

The Desert Bus of Greek vehicle manufacturer Biamax (1964)

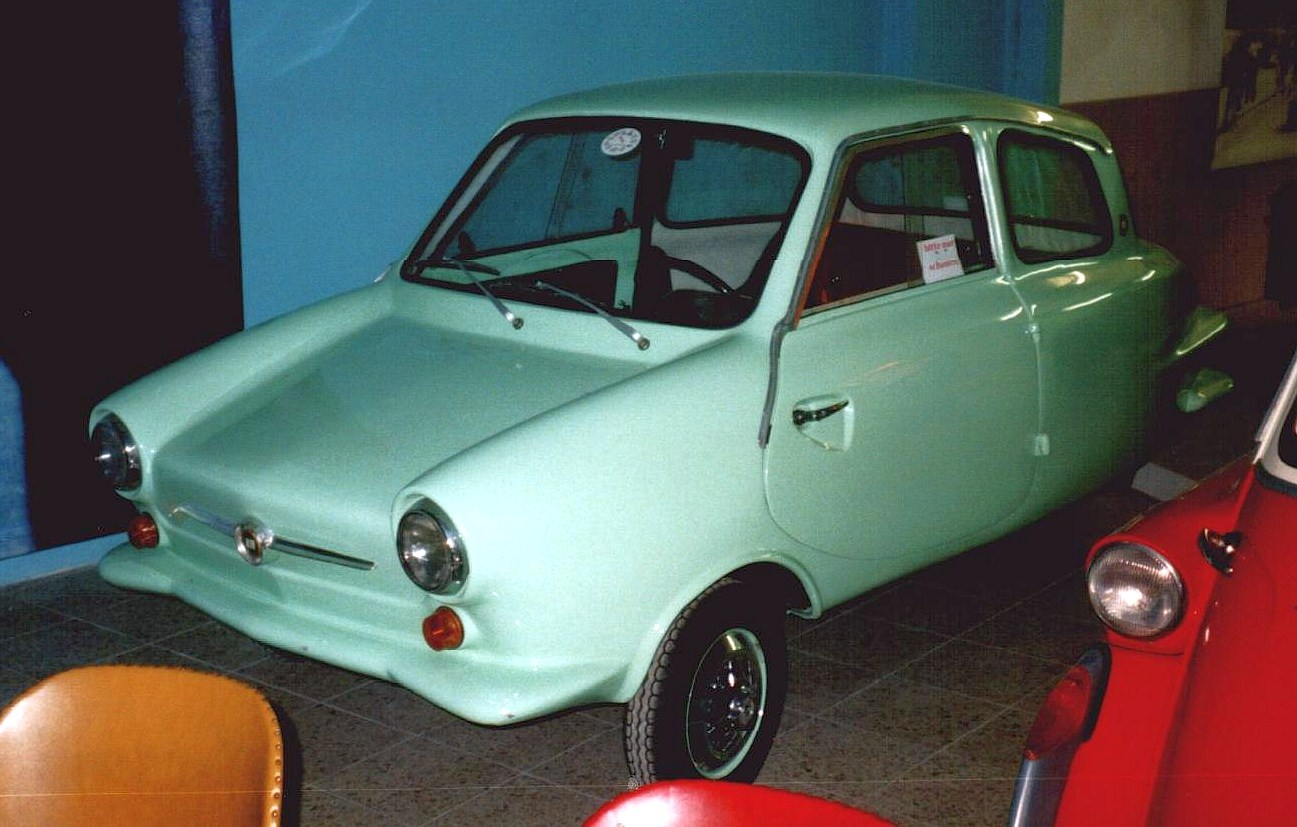
Alta A200 (1968)

== See also ==
- Economic history of Greece and the Greek world
- Post–World War II economic expansion
