= Dimitriadis 505 =

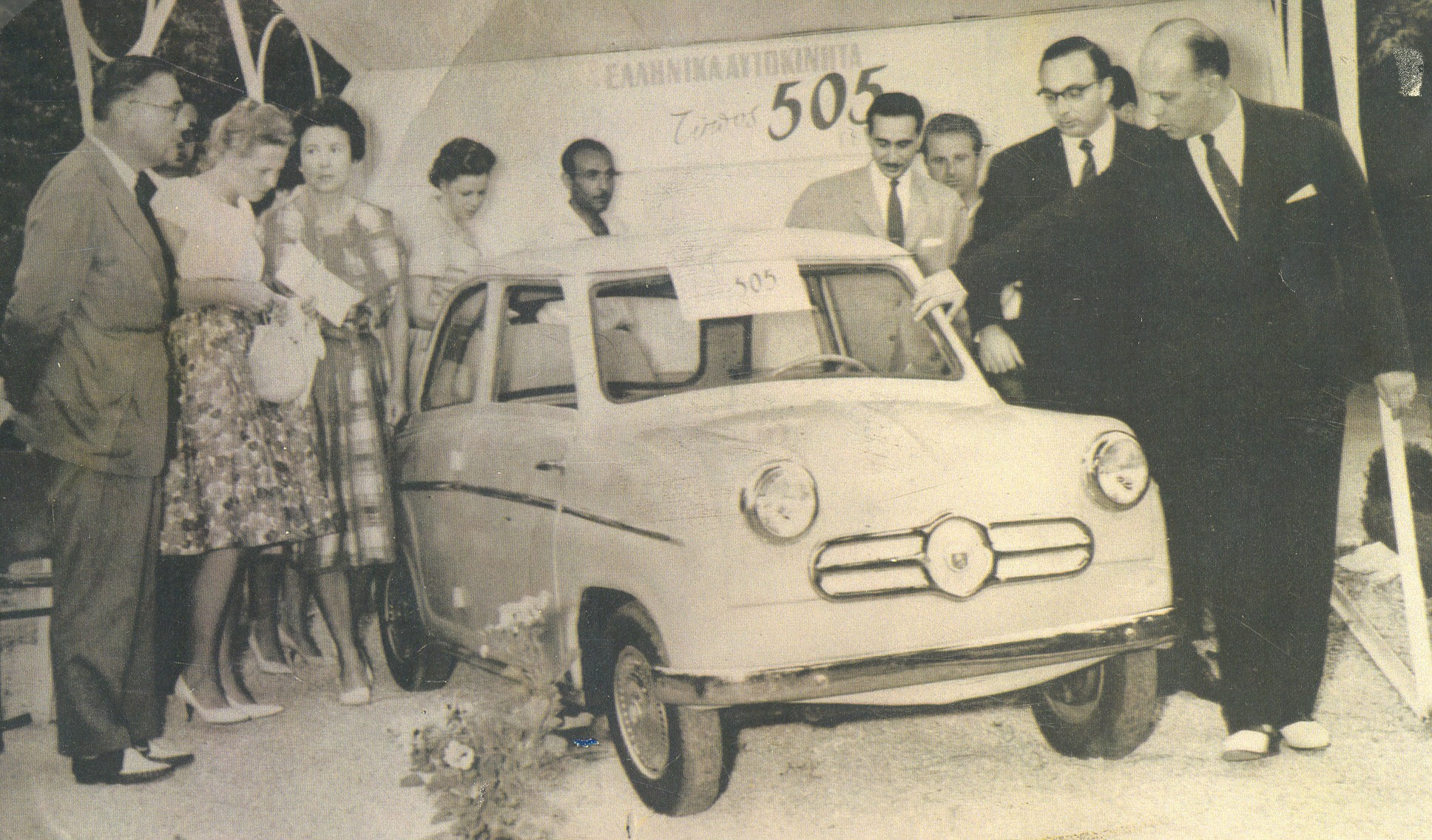
Dimitriadis 505 (1958)

The Dimitriadis model 505 was a Greek microcar developed in 1958 by G. Dimitriadis, founder of the Bioplastic boat and automobile manufacturer. This car represented his first effort in automobile production, and was presented in a number of exhibitions in Greece. According to Mr. Dimitriadis, its production was eventually considered non-profitable compared to that of three-wheelers (which were taxed much more favorably). Thus, he switched to the licence production of the German Fuldamobil three-wheeler (rebadged as the Attica).
