= Alta A200 =

Three-wheel passenger car

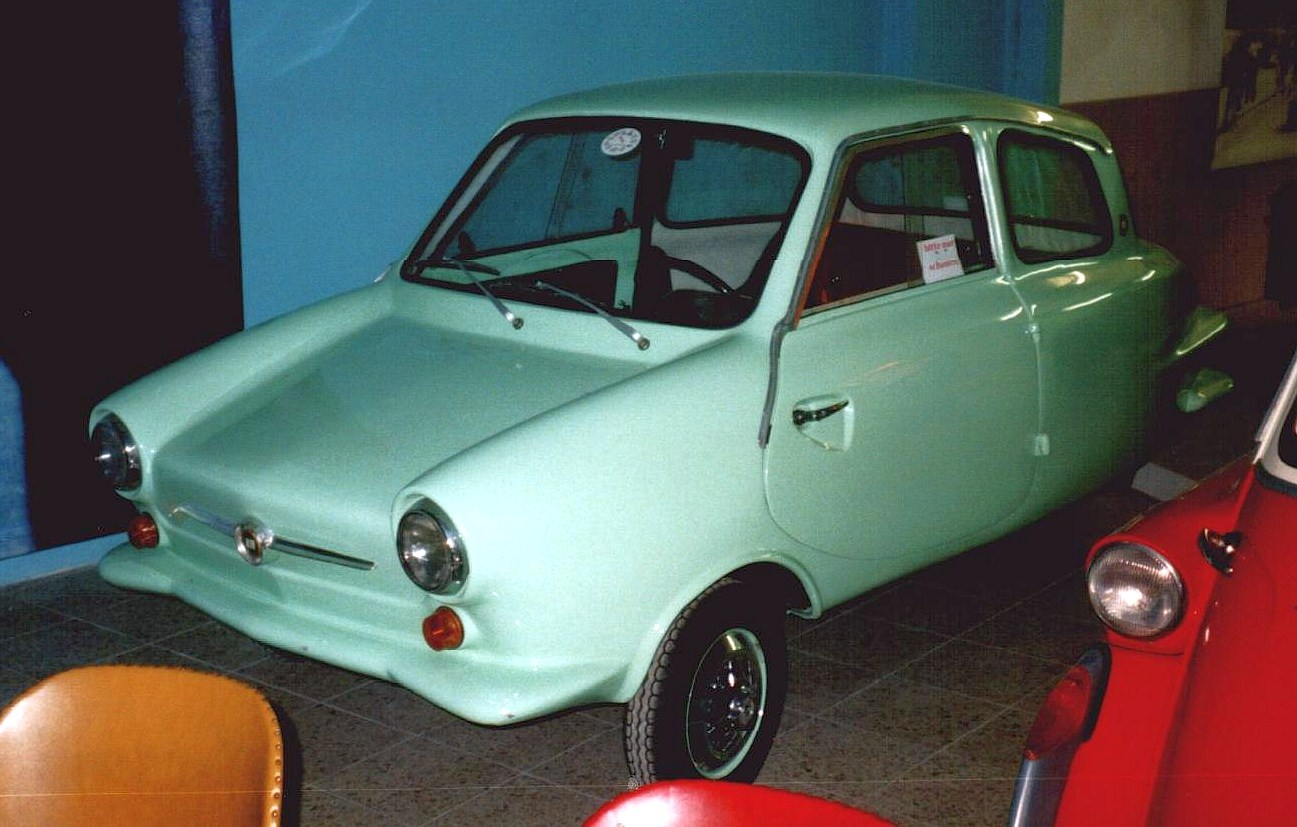
Alta A200 from 1968

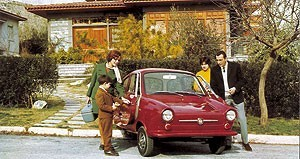
Alta A200 automobile

The Alta A200 was a three-wheel passenger car introduced in 1968, produced by Alta, a Greek vehicle manufacturer. The car was largely based on the German Fuldamobil (licence produced in Greece by Attica), but it was an altogether more modern design. Powered by a Heinkel 200 cc engine, the car had modest success in the Greek market and was soon considered outdated. Produced until 1974, it is often cited as the last derivative of the Fuldamobil and is seen by many as a collectible item.
