= DIM (automobiles) =

DIM logo

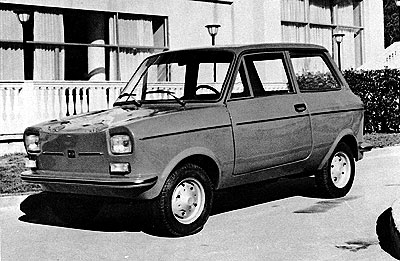
DIM 652 (1977 model)

DIM Motor Company, a Greek automobile maker, was created by Georgios Dimitriadis as a successor to his earlier company, Bioplastic S.A., which had produced the Attica automobile. The DIM represented one more effort by Mr. Dimitriadis to design and develop a modern car entirely by his company's own means. A 400cc, air-cooled, 2-cylinder, 30-hp engine was also developed in-house to power the vehicle, but due to delays in the engine development, the car was introduced with a 600cc engine and other mechanical parts of the Fiat 126 model. A 650cc Fiat engine was also used, in an improved version. The car was finally introduced at the Geneva Motor Show in 1977, and for this reason received more publicity than most Greek vehicles, appearing in many international publications. All development work had been made in a factory intended for its production in Acharnes, while the company was advertised in the Greek press; plans were also made for more versions, including a sports coupe. However, the costs involved and the car's poor prospects in the Greek market (despite an effort to facelift the model) resulted in termination of production after only about ten had been produced. The whole project was abandoned in 1982, having been Georgios Dimitriadis' last venture in the automotive industry.
