= Nobel (automobile) =

Nobel 200
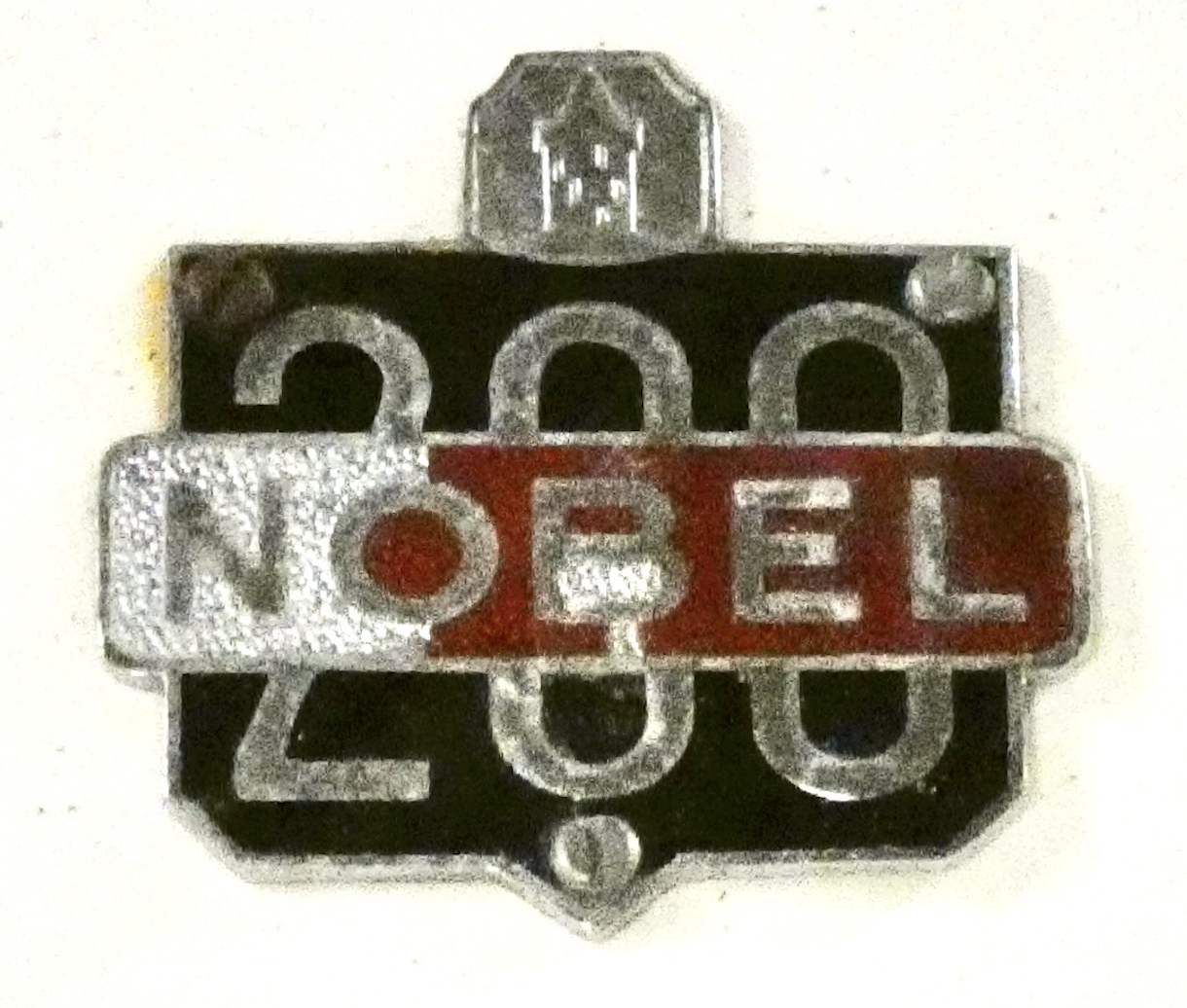

Overview
- Manufacturer: York Noble Industries Ltd
- Production: 1958-1962

Body and chassis
- Class: microcar
- Body style: 2-door coupé

Powertrain
- Engine: 200 cc Sachs
- Transmission: 4 speed manual with electrically operated reverse

Dimensions
- Wheelbase: 81 in (2.1 m)
- Length: 126 in (3.2 m)
- Width: 55 in (1.4 m)
- Height: 51 in (1.3 m)
- Curb weight: 672 lb (305 kg)

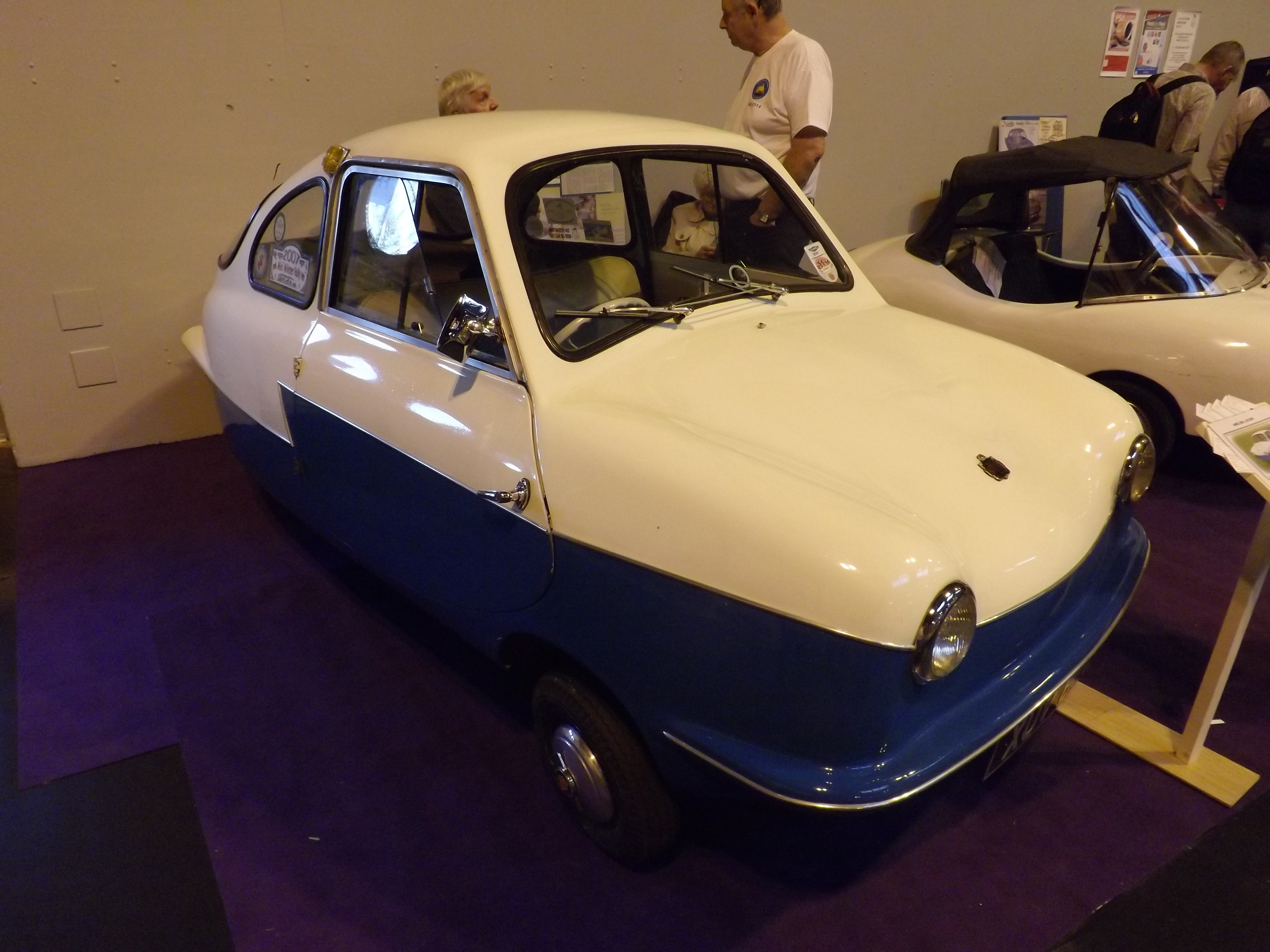
Nobel 200 (Fuldamobil S7 licence built in Belfast Northern Ireland) (15643846037)

The Nobel was a microcar built under licence from Elektromaschinenbau Fulda GmbH by York Noble Industries Ltd, between 1958 and 1962.

== Background ==
Born in Vienna on August 17, 1922, Jakob Knoblauch, was credited in at least one publication as the “designer of the first bubble car” although this is otherwise unsubstantiated. In England, he adopted the name York Noble and formed the company Noble Motors, Ltd., in May 1956, as UK concessionaires for the Heinkel bubble car, until its manufacture was transferred to the Dundalk Engineering Company, in Dundalk during 1958.

In December 1957, Noble set up another company, York Noble Industries Ltd, and in June 1958, it was announced that the company would be introducing two cars. The Nobel 200 limousine, a hard-top saloon, and the Nobel 200 ‘Vicky’, described as van or pick-up with detachable canvas top and side panels. Both vehicles would be available either as do-it-yourself kits or as ready to drive vehicles. The cars were described as re-designed versions of the German Fuldamobil, which with the exception of the Sachs engine, would be entirely built in Britain.

Shortly before York Noble made his announcement, a team had been sent on behalf of Short Brothers aircraft company by Sir Matthew Slattery to examine whether it would be viable for Shorts to build the Fuldamobil under licence.

Further details emerged in September 1958, when Cyril Lord, named as chairman of York Noble Industries, announced that manufacture would take place in Northern Ireland.

== Initial prototypes ==
Formula One World Champion Mike Hawthorn became associated with the marque towards the end of 1958, flagging away two Nobels amongst a host of other bubble cars at a promotional event in September, before appearing on the Nobel stand at the Paris Motor show the following month. At the show, it was announced that Hawthorn had accepted the role of Technical Director for York Noble industries. “Call me the outfit’s tea-boy” was his jovial riposte to the press.

Two Nobel saloons were on display at the Paris show, both differed from later production cars, with different side trim and a different two-tone colour scheme. At least one car was fitted with a sun-roof, and also had its fuel cap on the left at the rear rather than in the usual central position. Both cars were left-hand drive and were fitted with four wheels. It was confirmed at the show that the car would be assembled by Short Brothers & Harland Ltd at their Glen Works in Newtownards, Northern Ireland, although about 90% of the manufacture of parts was done elsewhere. The chassis was made by Rubery Owen. Production of the fibreglass body shell was subcontracted to the Bristol Aeroplane Company, with regular shipments of the bodies between Bristol and Larne Harbour.

== Production ==
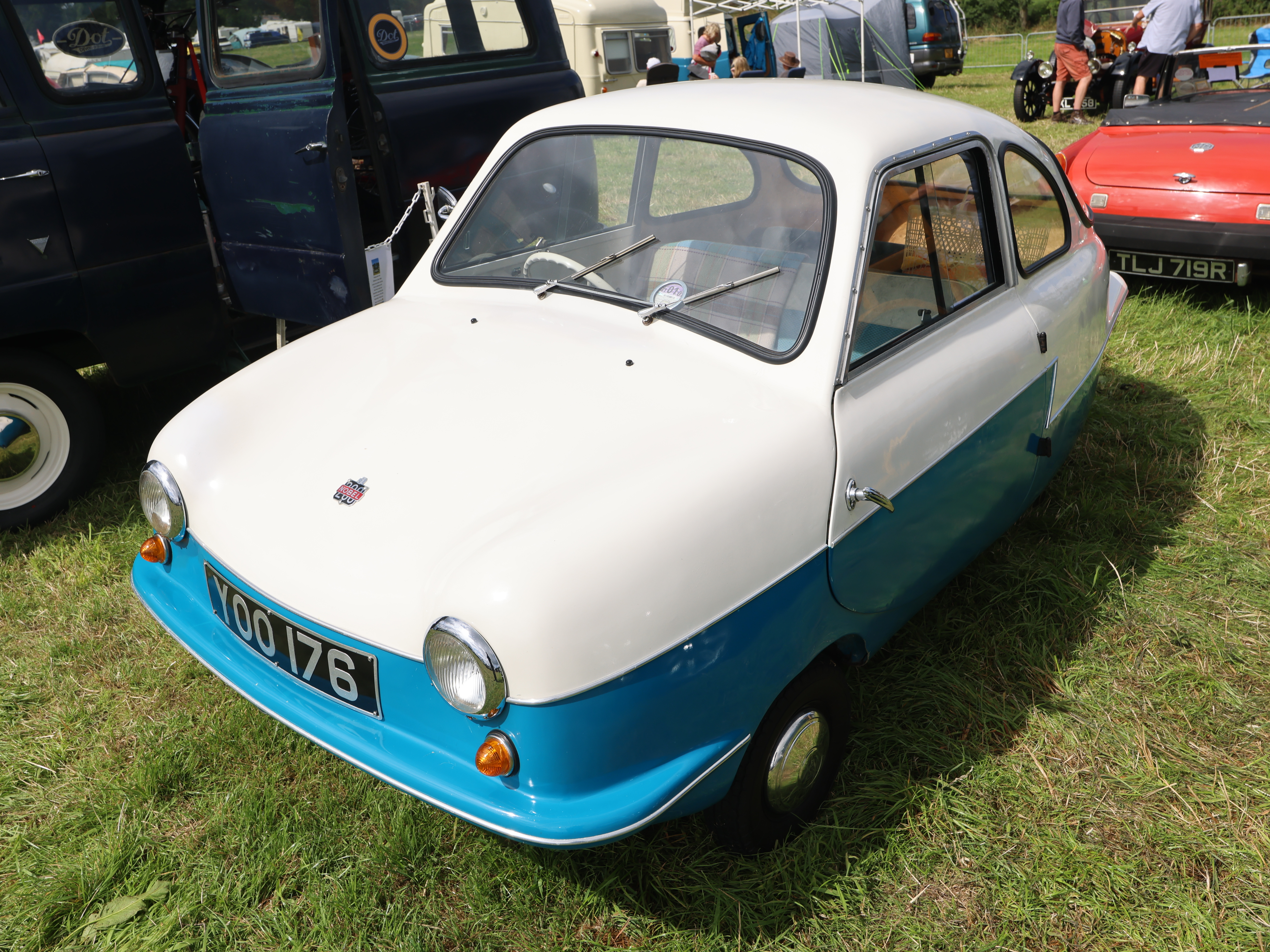
A Nobel 200

The Nobel used mainly rectangular box-section steel tube for its chassis. Although this, like much of the car, was almost identical to the initial Fuldamobil S7 design, there were many minor differences and the overall dry weight of the Nobel was slightly heavier. The original Fuldamobil front brake arrangement proved liable to faults and rectifying this held up production for several months.

The Bristol Aeroplane Company made the bodies at their factory at Coalpit Heath near Bristol. The intention was to produce these using new injection moulding techniques they had developed, with the fibreglass injected at high pressure between male and female moulds. This had been successful on small mouldings, but proved to be unreliable on the larger car bodies and eventually normal fibreglass lay-up techniques were adopted.

Official production of fully assembled saloon cars commenced in February 1959, with a provisional retail price in the UK of £317 before Purchase Tax. With the exception of the four-seater Reliant Regal, this made it the most expensive three-wheeled car on the market in the UK at the time. Four-wheeled versions of the saloon were available as an option, or for export markets. The rear axle on these were fitted without any differential and with a very narrow track between the rear wheels.

All production cars were painted white, with peacock blue lower sections. Self-coloured bodies made using pigments mixed into the gelcoat were experimented with, but this idea was abandoned when the overall finish proved unacceptable.

In the UK, the intention to produce the cars in kit form had been in the anticipation that this would enable buyers to benefit from a significant reduction in the total amount of tax payable, but this does not appear to have been secured. One car was shipped in kit form to New York in April 1959, but in May 1959 it was stated that kits would not be available for sale at least another six months, and it is unclear if any cars were ever sold in kit form.

A production capability of a 250 cars per week was often mentioned with regard to the Shorts factory, but despite extensive publicity, with the car appearing in London, and at major car shows in Paris, Geneva, and New York, where it was hoped that many four-wheel versions would be sold, and despite reports of large orders appearing in the press, chassis numbers indicate only about 400 of the cars had actually been produced by January 1960.

The appearance of the car at the 1959 New York International Automobile Show drew particularly positive reports and it was stated that 1450 Nobels had been sold, with the car making “a million dollars for Britain”. Despite such extravagant claims, there is no record to indicate that any cars were ever exported to the USA.

For the home market at least, it appeared that the retail price was too high, but it was also clear that with the production arrangements as they stood, there was very little scope to reduce it. In fact the Bristol Aeroplane company had attempted to increase the contract price for the bodies and in response, Shorts decided to transfer manufacture to their own factory at Queen’s Island in Belfast after autumn 1959. The additional overheads from transporting significant components such as the engines and chassis to Northern Ireland in addition to the subsequent cost of shipping completed cars back to the mainland made long-term production in Northern Ireland commercially untenable, and on 4 August 1959 it was announced that production by Shorts would cease after the first 1500 cars had been produced. Days after this announcement, a major strike by employees at Short Brothers and Harland began in protest at proposed redundancies. Though the specific issue of Nobel production was not the major trigger for the strike, it was felt to be a contributory factor, and the issue was raised by the Northern Ireland Labour Party when it called for the Northern Ireland Parliament to be recalled and steps taken to retain production of the Nobel. The strike was resolved after a few weeks, but it was without any deference or solution to the problem of the production costs of the Nobel saloon.

At the same time as he announced that production of Nobel saloons at Shorts in Northern Ireland would end, Lord stated that he was negotiating with several companies in England to take over their work. He also announced that the Fairey Aviation Company at Heaton Chapel, Stockport would manufacture two new models, a Nobel “utility” car and a sports convertible, although they would not be producing the saloon.

== See also ==
- List of car manufacturers of the United Kingdom
