= Alta (vehicles) =

Defunct Greek vehicle manufacturer

ALTA (ΑΛΤΑ)
- Industry: Vehicles
- Founded: 1962
- Defunct: 1978
- Fate: Defunct
- Headquarters: Athens, Greece
- Products: motorcycles, cars, three-wheeler trucks

Alta was a Greek manufacturer of light and heavier three-wheeler trucks, motorcycles and passenger cars. Production of motorcycles and three-wheeler trucks with Sachs 50cc engines started in its first factory in Athens in 1962. The 50S motorcycle model was known for its reliability (some survive to date in good working condition). In 1967 it designed and developed model A700, a heavier three-wheel truck with 2-cylinder BMW 35 hp engine and a payload of 800 kg. The truck, featuring a pleasant design and high reliability became one of the most successful vehicles of its kind in Greece. In 1968 Alta introduced a three-wheel passenger car, model A200 (three wheelers were classified differently according to Greek law). Powered by a Heinkel 200cc engine, the car was based on the German Fuldamobil (also produced by Attica in Greece under licence), but with Alta's own body design. The company moved production to a new, larger factory in Elefsis where it operated until 1978.

== Gallery ==
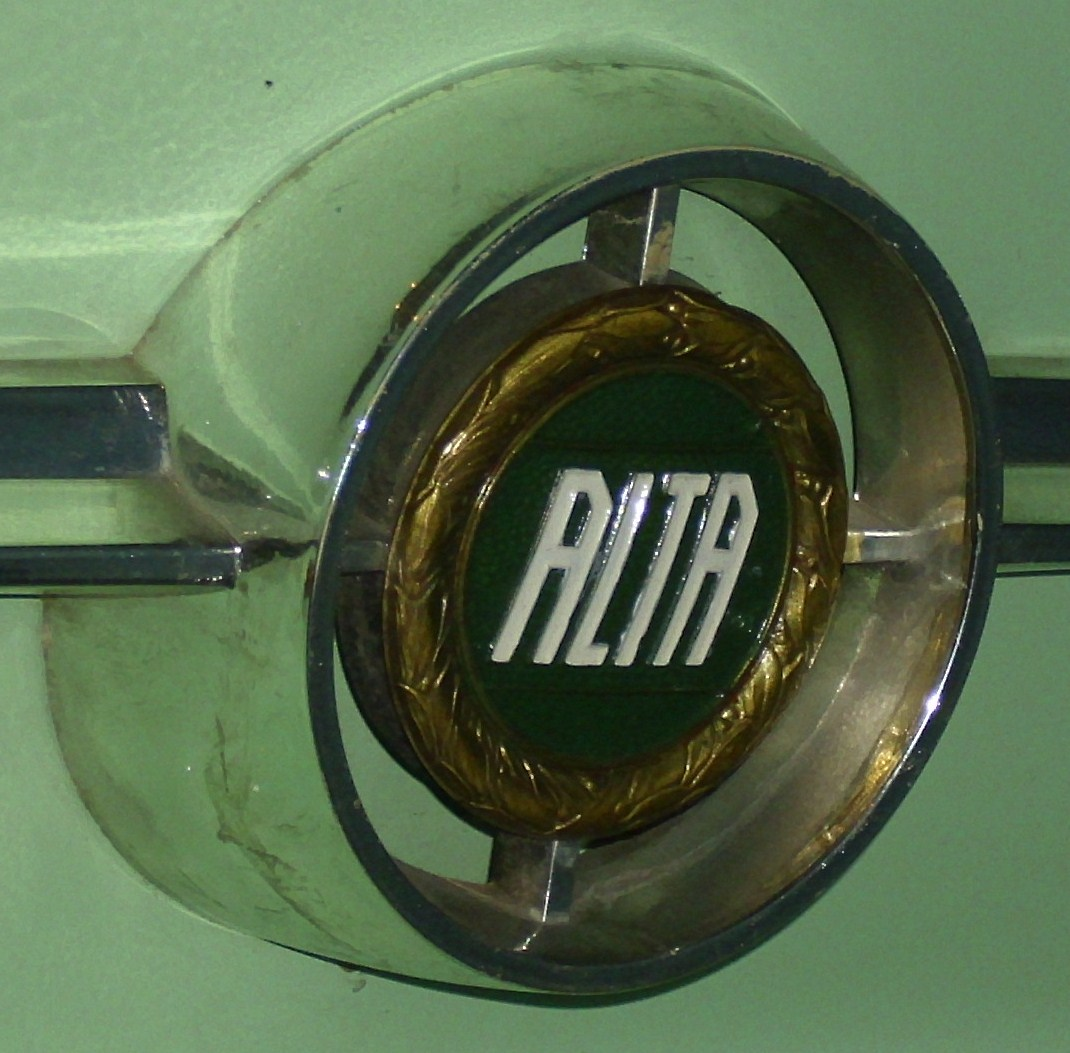
Badge

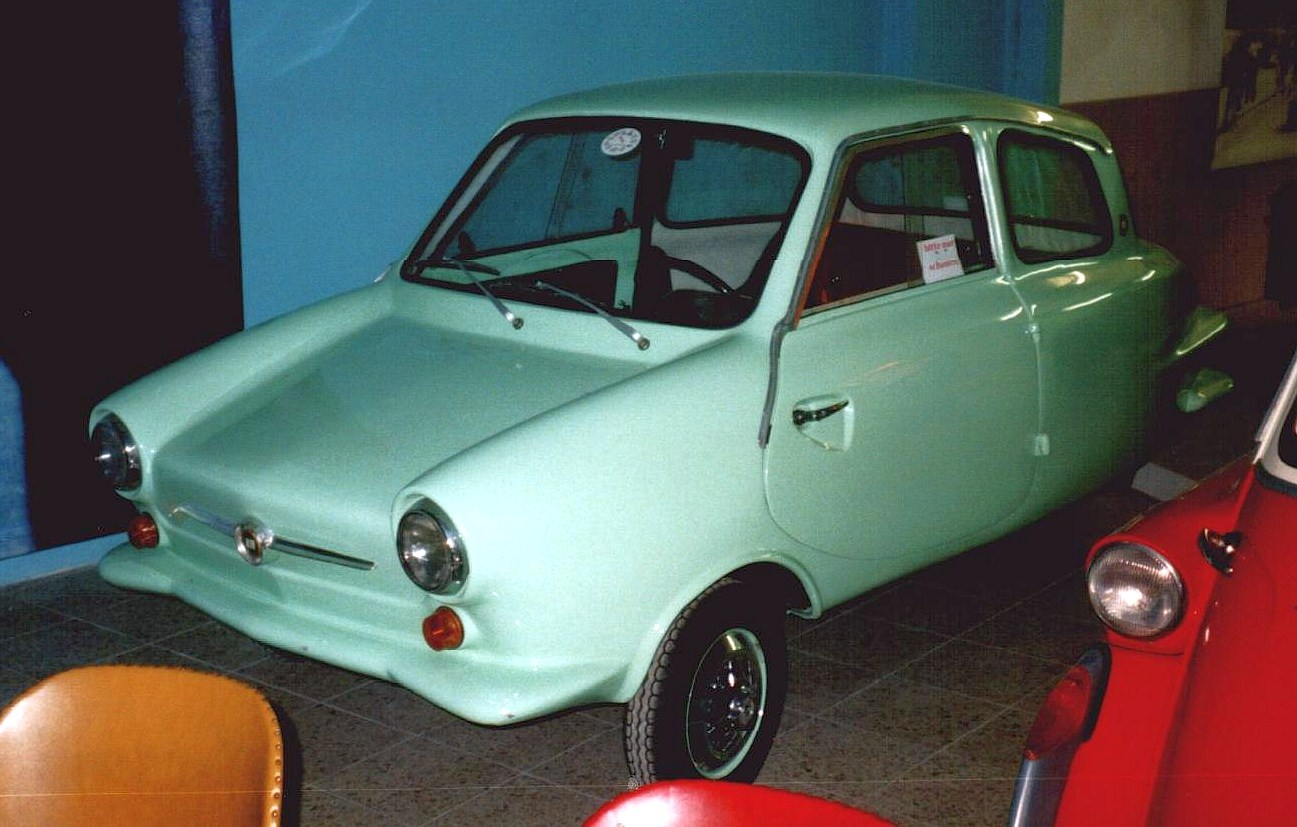
A200 of 1968

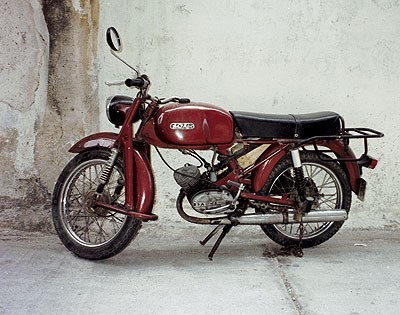
Alta 50S motorcycle (1962)

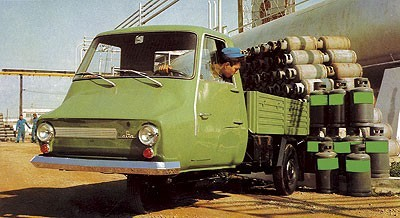
Alta A700 truck (1967)

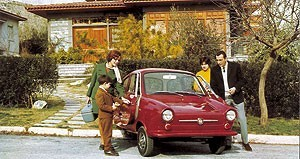
Alta A200 car (1968)
