= Attica (automobiles) =

Greek automobiles brand

Attica Logo

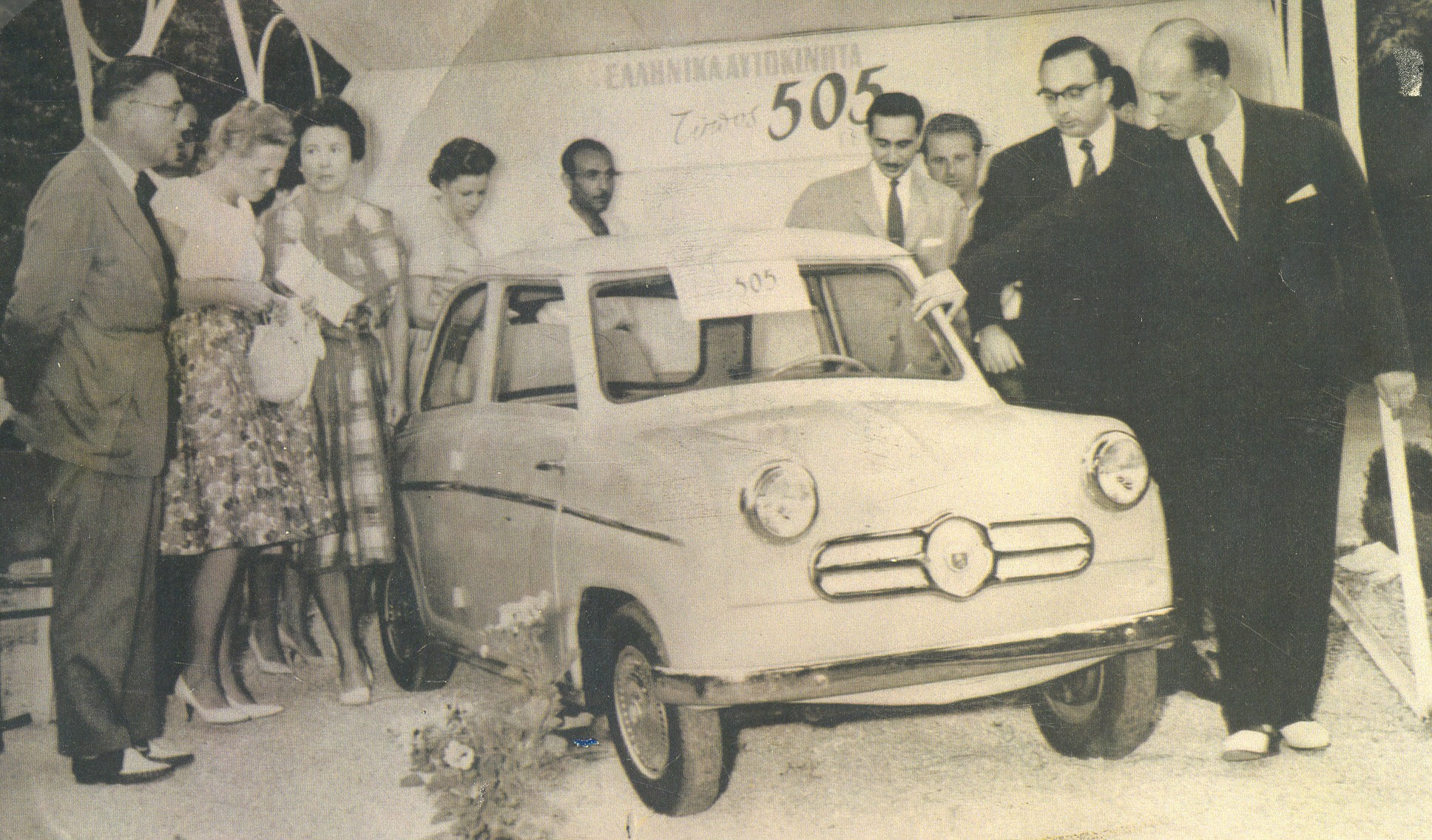
Microcar Dimitriadis 505 (1958). The car is exhibited in a Trade Fair; Mr. Dimitriadis (to the right of the car, with glasses) and Greek minister for Industry, Nikolaos Martis (extreme right) can also be seen. Despite the interest, this venture received no state support.

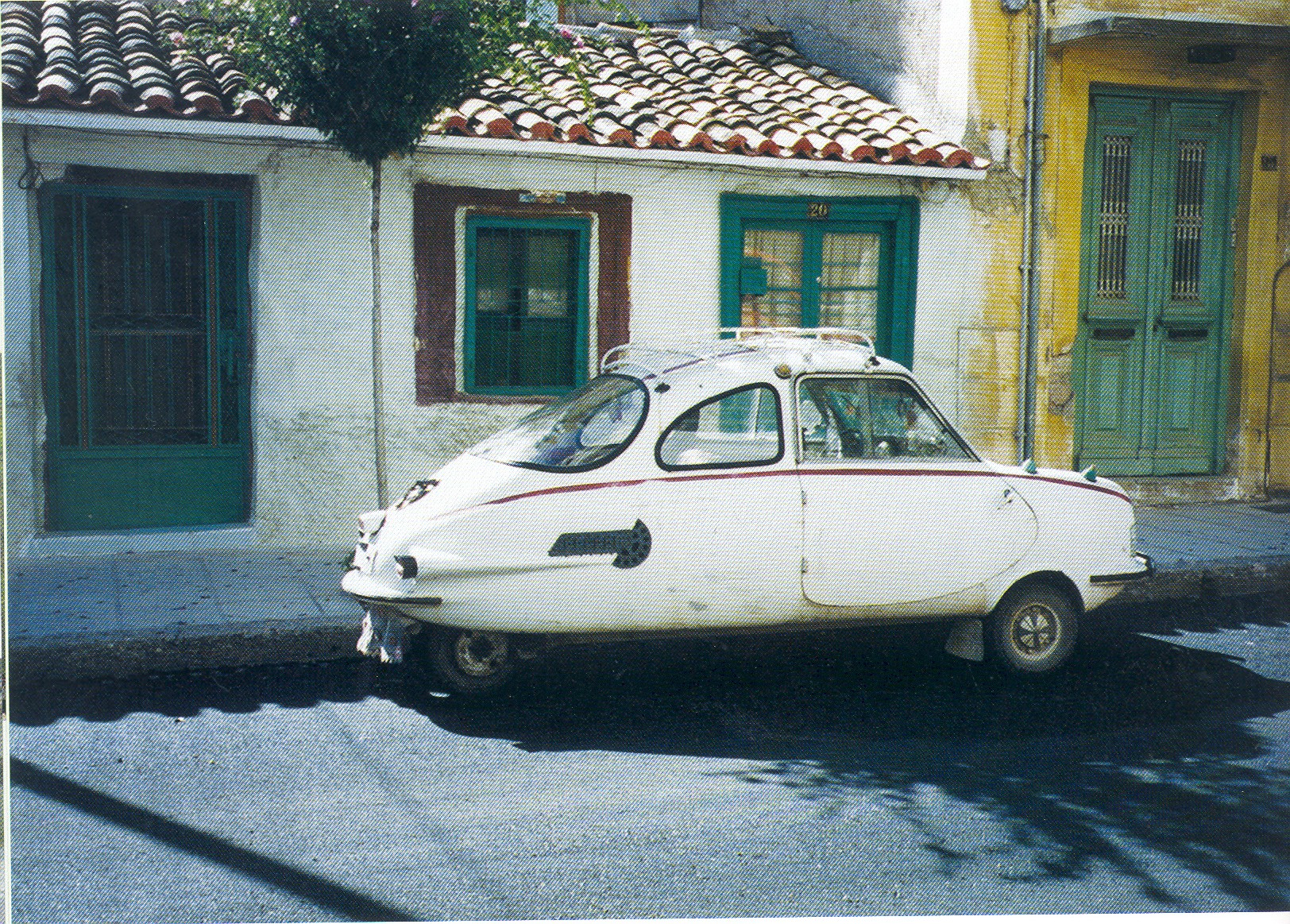
Attica 200 (1963). The car seems at home in the old part of a Greek provincial town.

Attica Carmel 12 (1965). The car, built under Israeli license, sold only a few dozen.

Delta Dimitriadi (1968). Light truck with 50 cc Sachs engine shown in an advertisement characteristic of its time.

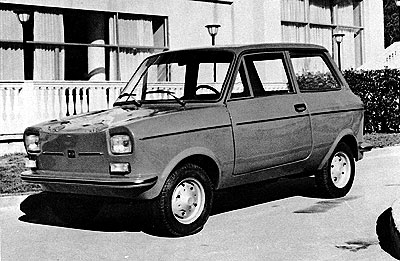
DIM 652 (1977). A short-lived model that succeeded the Attica.

Attica was a brand name of vehicles produced by Bioplastic S.A., a company (originally involved in fiberglass panel manufacture, later expanding into fiberglass boat manufacture) created in Moschato, Athens by Georgios Dimitriadis, a figure in Greek automotive history.

Mr. Dimitriadis had designed and built a light four-wheel passenger automobile (model 505) in 1958 with the intent to produce it. A tax imposed on four-wheel automobiles at the time, though, limited the car's market prospects; thus, he abandoned that plan, focusing instead on the production of three-wheelers - taxed as "motorcycles" in Greece. In 1962 he started production of a light three-wheeler passenger car under licence of Fuldamobil of Germany as the Attica model 200 (it was much easier for cars certified abroad to receive certification for production in Greece). The car was built with few changes from the original German design, but later two different cabriolet versions were developed by Attica itself. 200 cc engines (by Sachs, Heinkel as well as engines built by Attica itself) were used to power different versions of the car.

The model became very popular in Greece and is remembered to this date. Another Greek company, Alta, soon claimed a market share in the same category, introducing a similar vehicle in 1968; this was also based on Fuldamobil technology but it was extensively modified, with a more modern design. Attica 200 was nonetheless produced until 1971. In 1968 Bioplastic utilized the Attica 200 design to create a light three-wheeler truck brand named Delta (oddly enough, the rear-half of the 200 had become the front-half of Delta!), sold with modest success.

In 1965 Attica had already made an effort to enter the market of four-wheel automobiles, introducing the Carmel 12; the car was built under licence of Israeli Autocars company (which, in turn, had used British Reliant technology). In fact, the term "manufacture" is probably not appropriate in this case, as most parts were imported. Despite a publicity campaign, the car did not sell well and only about 100 Attica Carmel 12's were actually produced. In 1977 Dimitriadis transformed Bioplastic into a new company (DIM Motor) to produce the DIM, an entirely new passenger automobile designed and developed by his company. The car was presented in the Geneva Motor Show in 1977 but its life was very brief: only a few were produced.
