= Fuldamobil =

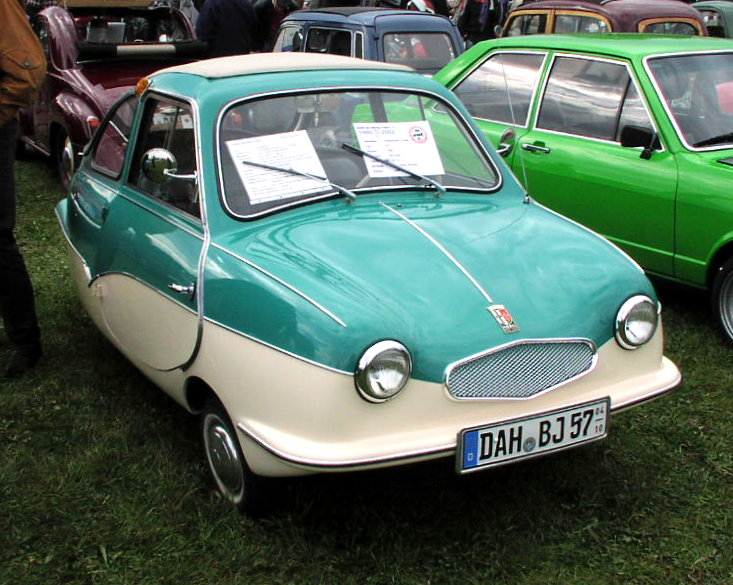

Overview
- Manufacturer: Elektromaschinenbau Fulda GmbH and Nordwestdeutscher Fahrzeugbau (NWF)
- Production: 1950-1969
- Designer: Norbert Stevenson

Body and chassis
- Class: Microcar
- Body style: 2-door Coupé; 2-door Convertible
- Layout: RMR

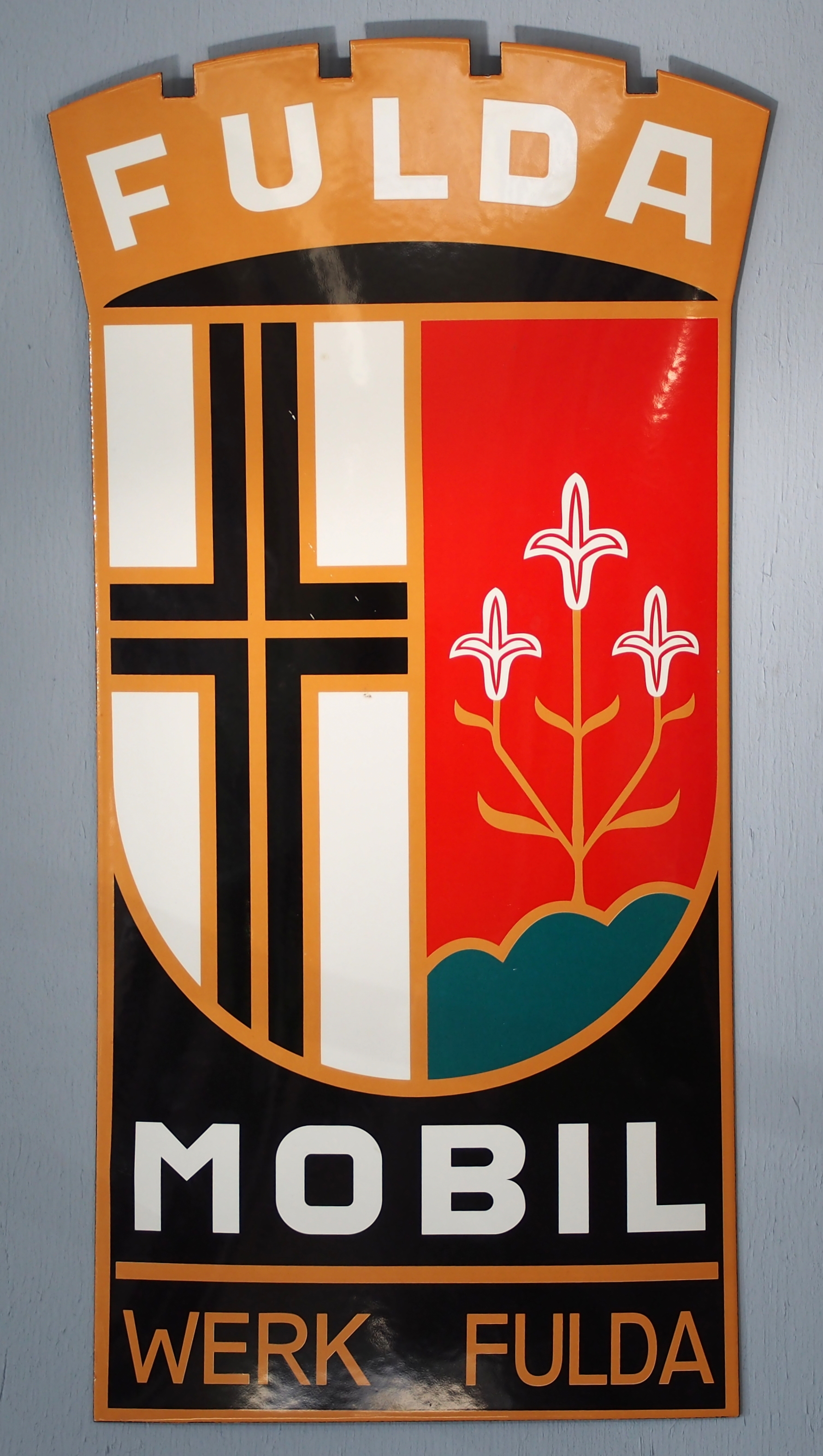
Logo used on cars produced at the Fulda works from 1954

Fuldamobil is the name of a series of small cars produced by Elektromaschinenbau Fulda GmbH of Fulda, Germany, and Nordwestdeutscher Fahrzeugbau (NWF) of Wilhelmshaven between 1950 and 1969. Various designated versions of the car were produced, although the vehicles produced under each designation were not always identical and the designations were sometimes misapplied. Though overall numbers produced were relatively small, the cars attracted sufficient attention to see licensed construction on four continents including Europe. In its ultimate configuration it is said to have inspired the term "bubble car". (Note: Zusätzlich ins Programm nahm Nobel eine offene Version des Fuldamobils, für das er die phantasievolle Bezeichnung "bubble-car" erfand.) It is acknowledged as the first car in the world to feature a negative scrub radius, now recognised as a major advance in driving safety.

== Background ==
The car's original design was conceived by Norbert Stevenson, a freelance journalist who had worked for the Rhein-Zeitung newspaper. As with many others involved in the field of automotive design, Stevenson had little in the way of formal qualifications in this area, although he had completed one term of mechanical engineering at the Technische Hochschule Berlin. His design concept was for a very simple three-wheeled car with room for two people inside, it would have two wheels at the front for stability, and be driven by a small engine at the rear.

Initial work on the project was carried out with funding from Peter Stein, the publisher of the Rhein-Zeitung, using a 350cc Horex Columbus engine and other proprietary components, but economic conditions at the time proved unworkable. The project was aborted and all the parts resold. Stevenson then approached several companies with his concept and in the summer of 1949, found backing from Karl Schmitt, a wealthy engineering graduate.

Schmitt was a Bosch wholesaler in the town of Fulda, Germany, who also ran another small company; Elektromaschinenbau Fulda GmbH, which had proved successful providing maintenance and repair of the emergency power generators in widespread use in Germany after the war.

== Prototypes ==
By October 1949, a new chassis had been started. A notable aspect of the front axle design was the incorporation of a negative scrub radius. Now recognised as a major advance in driving safety, this provides an inherent stabilising effect on slippery road surfaces or when brakes are applied unevenly to wheels on either side of the car. Although now a feature on the majority of front wheel drive cars and about a third of all rear wheel drive cars, the Fuldamobil is credited with being the first car in the world to feature this innovation.

The steel, central tube frame chassis was fitted with swing axle suspension on the front wheels and had the rear wheel mounted in a swinging arm. Braking was only provided on the front wheels, and was operated by cable. For cost reasons, shock absorbers were omitted, which did mean that with the body fitted, the prototype would wallow about like a ship at sea. (Note: "wie ein Schiff bei mittlerem Seegang" (Stevenson)) The prototype was fitted with a 198cc air-cooled Zündapp motorcycle engine. A conflicting report on the prototype in Das Auto states that it had an air-cooled single-cylinder two-stroke 250cc ILO engine.

The black and white painted coupé bodywork was slab-sided, streamlined, but heavy. It had a fabric roof, which could be rolled back for ventilation, a split windscreen and two side doors fitted with opening windows. Access for the driver and passenger via these rear-hinged doors was restricted, with the front wheel arch filling half the door width. The bodywork was constructed in eight days by the Leibold company in Fulda, and was based around caravan construction techniques, with metal sheet panels nailed to a wooden frame. Behind the doors on either side, were large, letterbox-shaped air ducts to provide cooling air to the engine. The end of the exhaust pipe emerged from a small circular hole near the tail.

Nicknamed "Flea", the prototype car made its official – if somewhat inauspicious – debut in the Rosenmontag carnival procession in Fulda, in March 1950. With the air-cooled engine, heavy body and slow, walking pace of the procession, it was perhaps inevitable that the car would succumb to heat failure en route, nevertheless, it was greeted enthusiastically by the press. The car was scrapped after 3000 km of testing.

The search for a more suitable engine got off to a bad start, with a disparaging response from Triumph-Werke in Nuremberg. Stevenson found a more willing supplier at the small Baker & Pölling works in Niedernhall. The company made one and two-man chainsaws, and were willing to adapt their existing compact 200cc engine to suit the car. The engine was already fan-cooled, and Baker & Pölling increased the capacity to nearly 250cc. The Fulda factory attached a Hurth 3-speed gearbox with reverse, driven by a primary chain and added an electric starter to the engine.

A second prototype using a 200cc Baker & Pölling engine and fitted with a roadster type body, was built around Christmas 1950. It was sold almost immediately.

== Production ==
Series production began in February 1951. The car underwent significant development, modification and changes in appearance throughout its production life, but generally was only referred to in advertising and contemporary publications as either the Fulda–Mobil or the Fuldamobil, without a specific designated model number or suffix. The principal exception was during the period 1953–1955 when the slab-sided version of the car — referred to as the Type N, and the more rounded version Type S — were manufactured and included simultaneously in company brochures.

Internal production records and some individual vehicle registration documents have been adopted subsequently and are now used by most modern reference works to allocate more specific model designations, but should not be seen as definitive.

=== Type N ===
Between February and June 1951, at least 48 cars were manufactured. The wooden framework for the bodies was now supplied by Alexander Schleicher GmbH & Co, but for a time, the material used for the external panelling varied from car to car. The majority used plywood sheets covered with a synthetic leather fabric. Fabric car bodies were common in the 1920s, and in post-war Germany the scarcity of sheet steel, coupled with low manufacturing cost and light weight, briefly countered more negative factors such as an old-fashioned appearance and relatively poor durability. At least one coupé retained the overall shape of the prototype, but with a single pane of glass for the windscreen and without its protruding headlights. However, it was felt that some potential customers were being put off by the styling, specifically the car's unconventional sloping front. They wanted a car with a bonnet, even if the engine was still at the rear. Drivers also experienced difficulty trying to reach the windscreen if it fogged up while driving, as there was no fan or heater to assist in keeping it clear. The issues with the bodywork design were resolved by adding a rounded nose to the car, whilst at the same time moving the windscreen closer to the driver and making it more upright. In the factory, this revised profile was called the "Bosom-car". This design first appeared in photographs in April 1951 and the new style car appeared at the IAA show in Frankfurt that same month.

At the Brussels Motor Show in January 1952, a prototype car appeared under the name "Succes". This car was to be produced in Belgium and would have been powered by a 200cc twin-cylinder engine made in Germany. In appearance, it was a very close copy of the Fuldamobil Type N roadster, but the car did not reach production, and apart from its styling, nothing to date suggests any connection to the Fuldamobil.

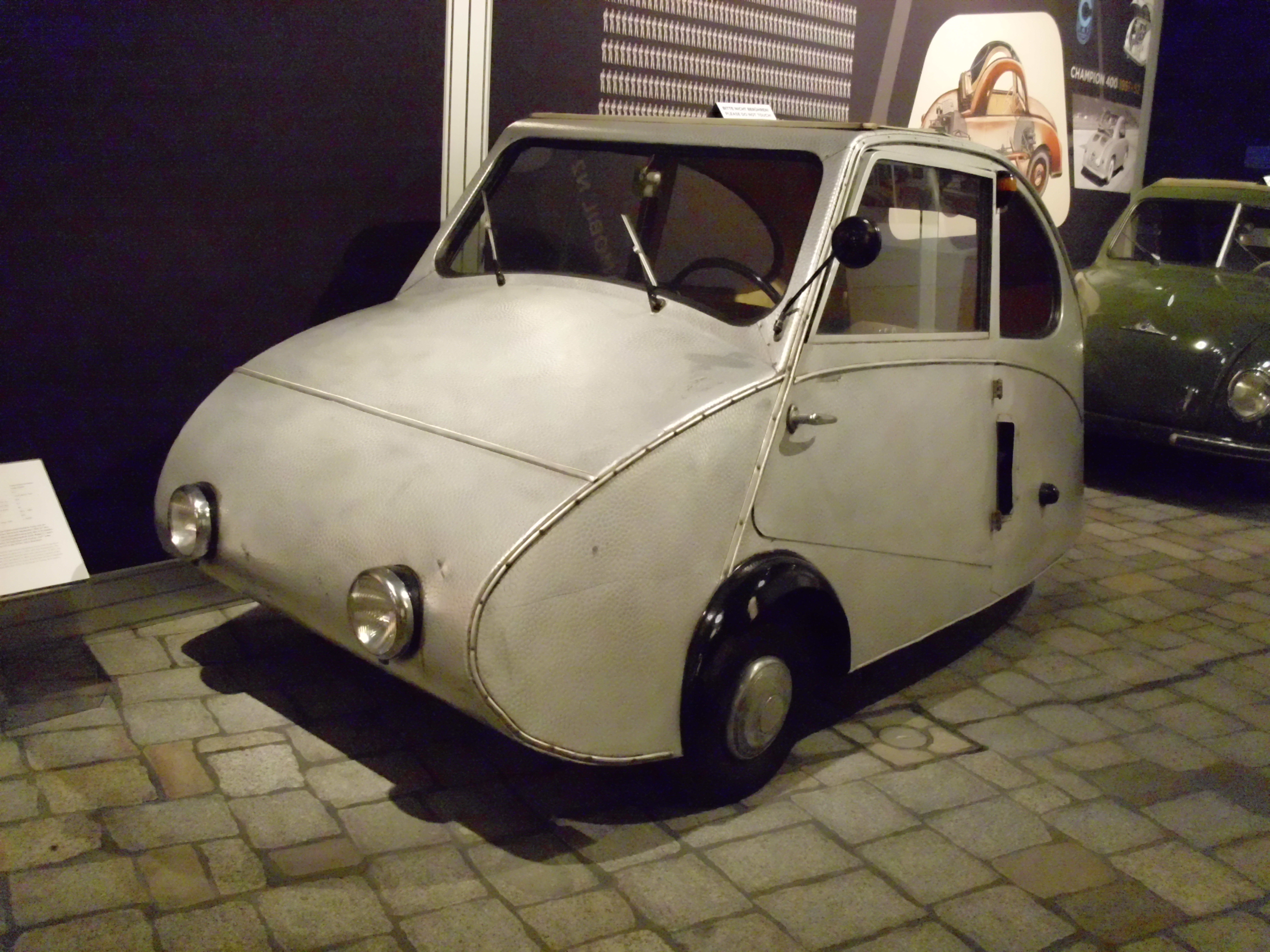
Hammered aluminium bodywork and the car's small size, prompted the nickname "Silver Flea".

Between June 1951 and September 1952, at least 346 Fuldamobils were manufactured. Recent secondary sources state that throughout this time, there were problems with the quality of the Baker & Pölling engines. Pistons would come noisily into contact with the cylinder head, or worse, drivers would find the barrel and head being shot from the crankcase into the back of their seat. The final straw came when one hundred engines sent back to Baker & Pölling for rework were returned. Rather than soundly rectify any structural failings, the remedial work consisted of the fitting of additional gaskets beneath the cylinders, a bodge which offered a far from a permanent or professional solution, whilst at the same time producing a detrimental effect on the overall performance of the car. A final order of one hundred engines was placed and delivered, but payment was withheld pending satisfactory rework to the earlier batch. Baker & Pölling are said to have gone bankrupt in the meantime. A more contemporary source indicates Baker & Pölling gearing up production to extend its range of Split-single engines at this time, used in the 125cc Express Radex motorcycle and manufactured at their Niedernhall factory. Baker & Pölling also took exception to an article in Auto Motor und Sport which mentioned that 360cc Fichtel & Sachs engines were now being fitted to the Fuldamobil, and pointed out several sporting achievements by the car whilst fitted with Baker & Pölling engines. Whatever the issues, by May 1952, it was reported that 360cc Fichtel & Sachs engines were now being fitted. Further, the plywood and fabric bodywork had been superseded by sheets of hammered aluminium, giving the car a very distinctive look, which led to the nickname "Silver Flea".

Bodywork from this point appears to be more consistent, all doors have straight edges, windscreen wipers are fitted to the bottom of the windscreen, there is a single small letterbox-shaped duct behind each door and sedans have rear side windows. Production is still described as more of an amateur hobby than a real automobile factory. Alongside the hammered, unpainted aluminium finish, the car was also produced with painted smooth aluminium skin at additional cost.

A version adapted for the disabled appeared at an Invalid carriage exhibition in Munich in July 1952. Around the same time, Werner Ritterbusch, a disabled war veteran, drove his Fuldamobil on a round trip of nearly 9,000 km (5,592 mi) from Oberzwehren in Kassel to Lapland and back. Another notable achievement for the car came in August the following year. Former Czech racing driver Georg Kremel, a Fuldamobil company representative, made a non-stop journey across some of the steepest roads in Europe, taking in the Grossglockner, Plöcken and finally the Katschberghöhe Alpine passes, the last of which included a 2 km, 32% ascent.

One issue with the 360cc Fichtel & Sachs engine that was problematic, was its capacity. Driving licence regulations in Germany at that time meant that holders of a class IV licence could only drive vehicles with engines up to 250cc in size. The situation was resolved in January 1953 when Fichtel & Sachs brought a bigger alternative to their successful SM51 - 150cc engine onto the market, by increasing its capacity with a bigger barrel and piston to bring it up to 175cc. At the Frankfurt Motor Show in March the same year, it was announced that this engine would be available as an alternative to the 360cc model. The car also had one other significant modification, it was now fitted with a front bumper.

Production of cars with the Type N body probably ended in August 1954, (Note: Most sources give August 1955 for the end of production of the Type N, but August 1954 would seem far more logical and this is supported by a contemporary source. "das alte Modell wird nicht mehr gebaut", "the old model is no longer built".) although most sources state August 1955.

=== Type S ===
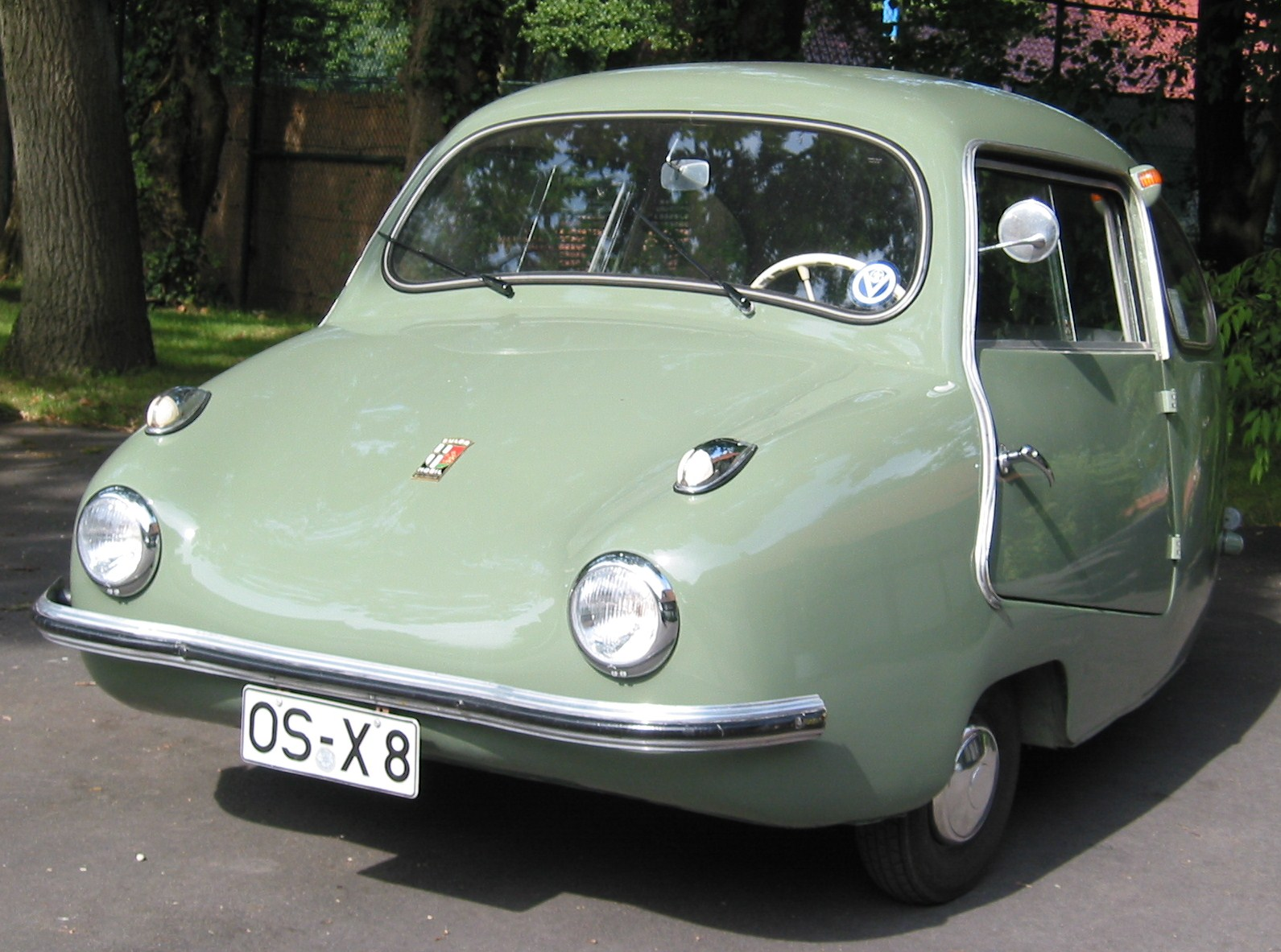
The more rounded shape of the Fuldamobil Type S

In October 1953 at the IFMA (International Bicycle and Motorcycle Exhibition) in Frankfurt, a completely restyled Fuldamobil made its official debut. Recent sources state that a prototype had been displayed earlier in July 1953, which may have been at the Great Rationalization Exhibition that took place in Düsseldorf at that time and where the manufacturers of the Fuldamobil had been awarded a gold medal for their contribution to motorization for the people. The new style of bodywork has been likened by some to a tiny brother of a Porsche, while to others it looked more like a kind of Walt Disney pig. The rounded and more nominally streamlined shape was designed by Norbert Stevenson and master coach-builder Wilhelm Lehnebach, who had also made a major contribution to the design and construction of the original prototype bodywork for the Fuldamobil back in 1949. The pair produced a wood and plaster model of the new design in ten days. The bodywork was manufactured in sections by VDM Metals using heat-formed aluminium sheets which were then welded together. The body was wider than the Type N, and the seats could be folded by pulling a lever to form a flat, sleeping platform inside for two people. The luggage space above the engine was now accessible from the rear via a rudimentary tailgate with a very small window above. Unlike the final Type N, at this point the Type S had no bumpers, but underneath it still had the 360cc Sachs engine, 3 wheels, and was fundamentally unchanged.

In the five months between October 1953 and March 1954 when the Type S is said to have gone on sale, there were several modifications. A major issue was caused by the improved structural integrity of the body, which was found to resonate with vibrations from the engine and amplified the engine noise excessively. This was dealt with by isolating the engine from the main chassis with rubber mounts, and suspending the engine and drive train on a horizontal pivot, linked by the suspension to the main chassis in a similar manner to many motor scooters. While this did help alleviate some of the problems with noise, it was at the expense of the handling, which – exacerbated by the significant extra weight of the new body – was notably worse. This was addressed by linking the drivetrain to the chassis with a panhard rod, although this was only partially successful in resolving the problem.

Whether or not the Type S did go on sale in March 1954 is questionable, only three examples of this type are said to have been produced at the factory in Fulda. The Fuldamobil was now Elektromaschinenbau Fulda's largest source of income, and the Type N would remain in production for some time with parts for a large number of cars held at the factory. Output had already doubled from about four cars a week in 1953, to about eight, but with demand still growing, any further increase required an outside partner.

=== Nordwestdeutscher Fahrzeugbau GmbH ===
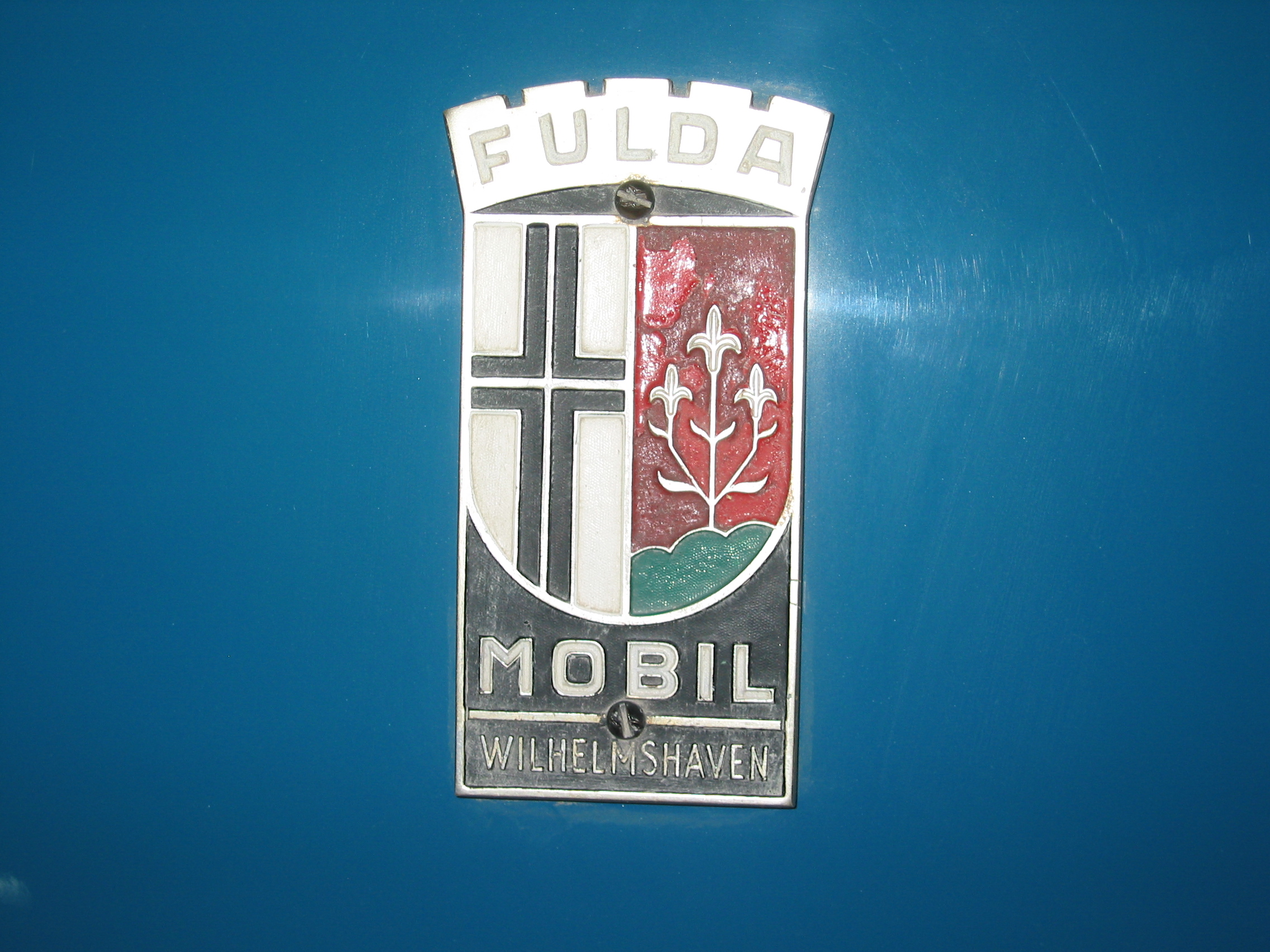
The logo used on NWF produced cars

The firm of Nordwestdeutscher Fahrzeugbau (NWF) had been established in 1946 and built specialised bodywork for a variety of vehicles, including buses, ambulances and postal vans and operated in conjunction with the much larger company of Krauss-Maffei. The NWF factory had worked on a series of prototypes of a road/rail bus, the Schienen-Straßen-Omnibus, and when the expected demand for further buses of this type proved to be lacking, were left with excess capacity to fill. At this same time, International interest in microcars had grown rapidly and had begun to attract serious investment from established companies such as Messerschmitt and Hans Glas. The Fuldamobil was already a well-established product, but the factory had very little capacity to increase production further, so a licensing agreement between Elektromaschinenbau Fulda and NWF appeared to be mutually beneficial. NWF began series production in July 1954, anticipating the building of 1000 cars per month.

The deal for NWF to build the main bulk of the new model appears to mark the breaking point between Karl Schmitt and Norbert Stevenson. Early in 1954 Stevenson had been experimenting with another three-wheeled prototype, a roadster with a 175cc Sachs engine over a single front wheel, two bench seats placed back to back and simple hammered aluminium bodywork similar to the type N. The design had been rejected by Karl Schmitt who felt Elektromaschinenbau Fulda could not “afford to have several models in the program”. (Note: "Mehrere Modelle im Programm, das können wir uns nicht leisten" (Schmitt)) Stevenson had also been complaining for some time about his poor wages and yet the company was financially healthier than many competitors. When he was approached by entrepreneur Romanus Müthing in the Spring of 1954 he quickly accepted the offer of a substantial commission to direct a team working on a redesign of the Pinguin (automobile).

NWF were at the time the second largest coachbuilding company in Germany and were looking to diversify their output with the Fuldamobil, to the extent that it would form the bulk of their production at a factory in Lohne, which was due to open in 1955 and where they were hoping to employ as many as a 1000 workers. NWF technicians made some changes to the Type S before it went on sale. There was a new rectangular badge on the nose, front and rear bumpers were fitted, a rain gutter was added around the doors, and a single rear window (identical to one of the two used on a split rear window VW) was fitted into - rather than above - an enlarged tailgate. Perhaps most significantly they replaced the 360cc Sachs engine with a 200cc Ilo motor with 3 gears.

Despite the reduction in capacity, the power output was identical to the Sachs 360cc engine whilst at the same time resolving the capacity-related driving-licence issue, previously mentioned, with a motor more powerful than the 175cc Sachs engine used in the Type N. Torque figures were substantially less than the 360cc motor however and Stevenson pointed out that this would substantially reduce the cars hill-climbing ability.

The plan was for NWF to supply cars to the home market in Germany as well as across the globe. The Fulda factory would continue to produce the 360cc cars on a limited basis, principally supplying Switzerland and the Benelux countries, but eventually only the 200cc version would be sold. The two versions of the car were referred to in the press as the Fuldamobil S 360 and the Fuldamobil NWF 200.

At this time, no official Fuldamobil dealer or distribution network existed. A position for a sales rep was advertised at the end of July, after production at NWF was said to have commenced. Towards the end of 1954, manufacture at NWF was suspended “to meet urgent orders from Ford”, during which time demand for the car was said to have continued, with production from Fulda fulfilling requirements. In April 1955 the factory in Lohne was opened.

Based on previous sales of the Fuldamobil, the massive increase in production by NWF may appear to have been somewhat starry-eyed, but by the end of 1954, new registrations of the Fuldamobil NWF 200 stood at 673, in addition to 327 of the 360cc Fulda produced cars. Whilst these figures were very impressive compared to previous years, Messerschmitt had sold over 3700 cars in the same period and were well on their way to building and selling 1000 cars per month. The market for microcars did appear to be still growing, but in October 1954 the news that BMW, with a much more established international presence, were setting up to mass-produce the Isetta, and that both the Messerschmitt and Isetta would be cheaper, faster and more powerful than the Fuldamobil meant demand for the Fuldamobil faltered.

Within months of the factory in Lohne opening, NWF were in real difficulties. Sales volume had been insufficient to keep up with production and cars quickly stockpiled and were sold back to Fulda to save payment on licensing fees. Production had stopped by September 1955 Cash-flow quickly became an issue and Nordwestdeutscher Fahrzeugbau was forced into bankruptcy.

=== Fuldamobil S4 ===
Whilst NWF struggled to sell and distribute the 200cc cars that it produced, the factory at Fulda appears to have continued in much the same way as it did before, Type N production giving way to Type S around September 1954 with all the Fulda produced Type S cars fitted with the 360cc Sachs engine. After unsuccessful experiments with Adler & Lloyd engines, the 200cc Sachs engine was adopted probably in the early part of 1955 and very soon afterwards series production of the 360cc version likely ceased. With the addition of some NWF cars being sent back to the Fulda factory in lieu of licensing fees, there is some ambiguity about production dates during 1955 and Auto motor und sport show four different versions (N 200 - 2200 DM, N 360 - 2200 DM, S 200 - 2780 DM, and S 360 - 2990 DM) simultaneously on their list of car prices for February and June that year. In September 1955 this ambiguity ends and is replaced by a single model, The Fuldamobil S4.

The most significant change with this development was the fitment of two rear wheels. Fitted without any differential and with a very narrow track between, they provided a significant improvement to the handling, and the body was made slightly longer to accommodate them. Other changes were a larger rear window in the tailgate, the enclosure of the final drive chain in an oil bath, decorative trim strips on the centre of the nose and along the sides of the car and the repositioning of the windscreen wipers above the windscreen rather than below.

Factory advertising includes the S4 suffix and shows the car fitted with the optional sun roof. Three-wheeled versions are said to have been available on request, to continue to take advantage of lower tax rates for three-wheelers, but this accommodation became redundant in Germany in May 1956, when the law was changed so that vehicles with two adjacent rear wheels less than a tyre width apart, were given the same tax advantage as three-wheelers. In 1956, a roadster version of the aluminium-bodied Type S was built and this was subsequently given the model number S5. It was said to be available to order, although only one example is believed to have been built.

Towards the end of 1955, a contract for licensed production was signed between Karl Schmitt and Fritz Neumeyer, the head of Zündapp. Although it was expected that modifications to the car would be made at Zündapp, including the fitment of their own engines, some preliminary changes were also made to the car at Fulda. The chassis was redesigned with the front suspension simplified to cut costs, although this also meant the loss of its negative scrub radius and the rear hatch was replaced by a larger fixed window. Two sample cars were sent to Zündapp for detailed examination, but the Zündapp project was cancelled early in 1956.

Production of the cars at Fulda remained more of a hobby than a business, with the few cars built each month being sold before they were finished to a loyal band of customers. When a magazine took a photograph of the roadster in 1957, Schmitt's response was that they shouldn't publish it, otherwise people might order that version too. The modifications made to the Fuldamobil for Zündapp were retained for production cars and the revised car was presented to the public at the IFMA show in October 1956 where two-tone paintwork was also offered for the first time. This version has subsequently been referred to as the S-6.

=== TL 400 ===
Also late in 1956, a small four-wheeled Fuldamobil truck was developed. Known as the TL 400, it used a Lloyd 400 engine and was based on Fuldamobil running gear. Apparently produced on-demand, it was never advertised, very few were made and only one example (from 1962) is known to survive. Some sources suggest this may have been the only example produced. The truck weighed 900 kg (1,984 lb) and had a payload of 460 kg (1,014 lb). Top speed was 40 mph (64 km/h).

=== Fibreglass bodies ===
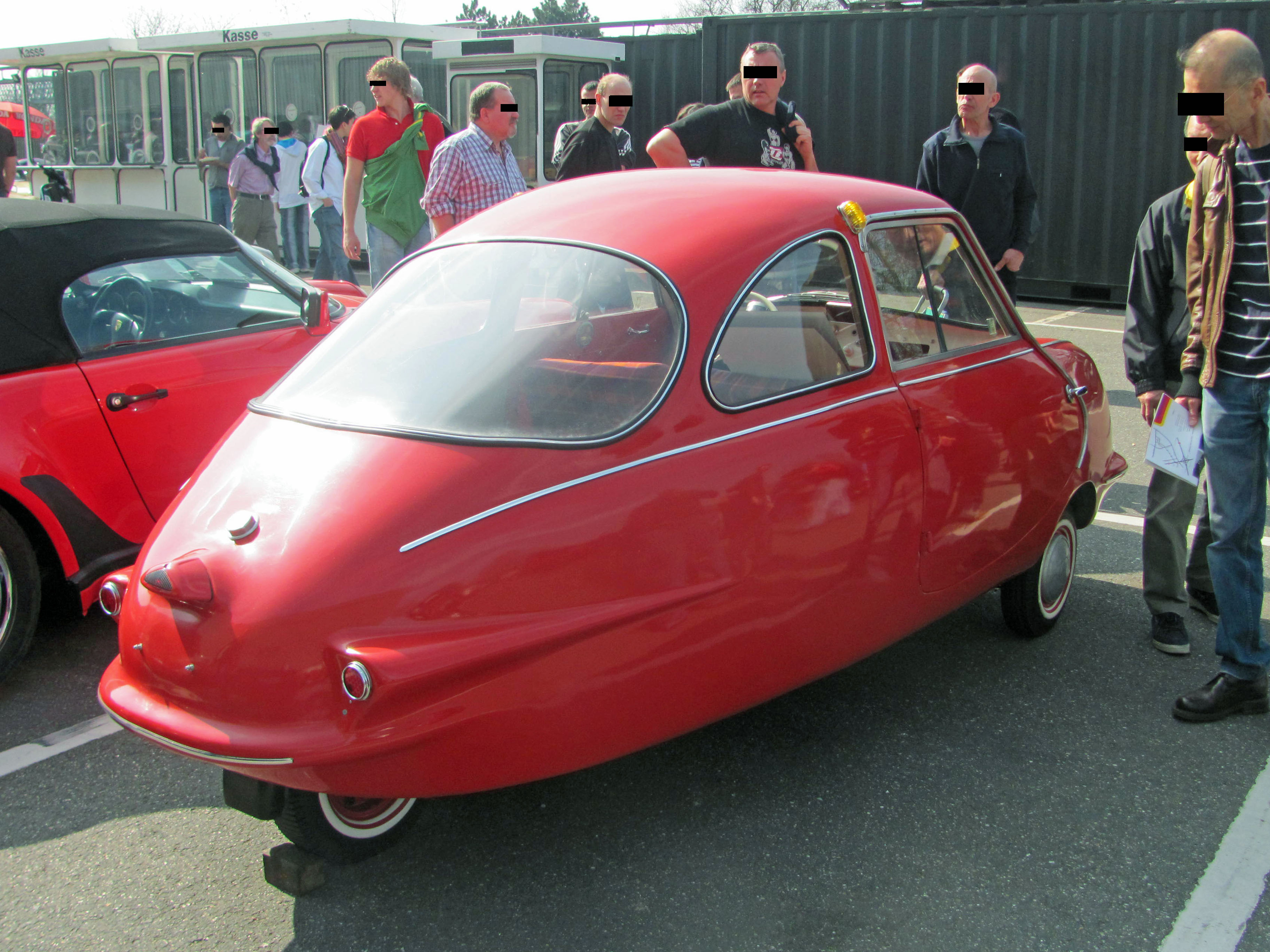
The smooth lines of the fibreglass-bodied version of the Fuldamobil are shown clearly in this view of the rear

At the start of 1957, work began on developing a new, lighter fibreglass body for the Fuldamobil. Designed by Elektromaschinenbau Fulda's new chief designer Adolf Sander, this version would be known as the S7, and the new-style body made its first public appearance at the Swedish motorcycle show in March 1957 as the license-built Fram-King-Fulda. Its German debut came later in the year at the Frankfurt Motor Show in September. The S7 was longer and taller with bigger windows and smoother lines than previous cars, and the weight reduction of around 55 kg significantly improved both acceleration and fuel consumption. As it now required no wooden framework underneath, the bodies for this model were much simpler to mass-produce and it quickly became the most successful type in attracting licensed manufacture in other countries, where the number of cars produced would ultimately be significantly higher than at the Fulda works, even if most of this licensed production was very short-lived in comparison.

There were minor detail changes throughout its production life, but the most significant was forced upon it when Fichtel and Sachs ceased production of their 200cc engine in 1965. Somewhat fortuitously, this came at the same time as production was winding down of the British built Trojan 200, a development of the Heinkel Kabine bubble car and this allowed the Heinkel engine to be used in the Fuldamobil with very little modification.

== Licensed production ==
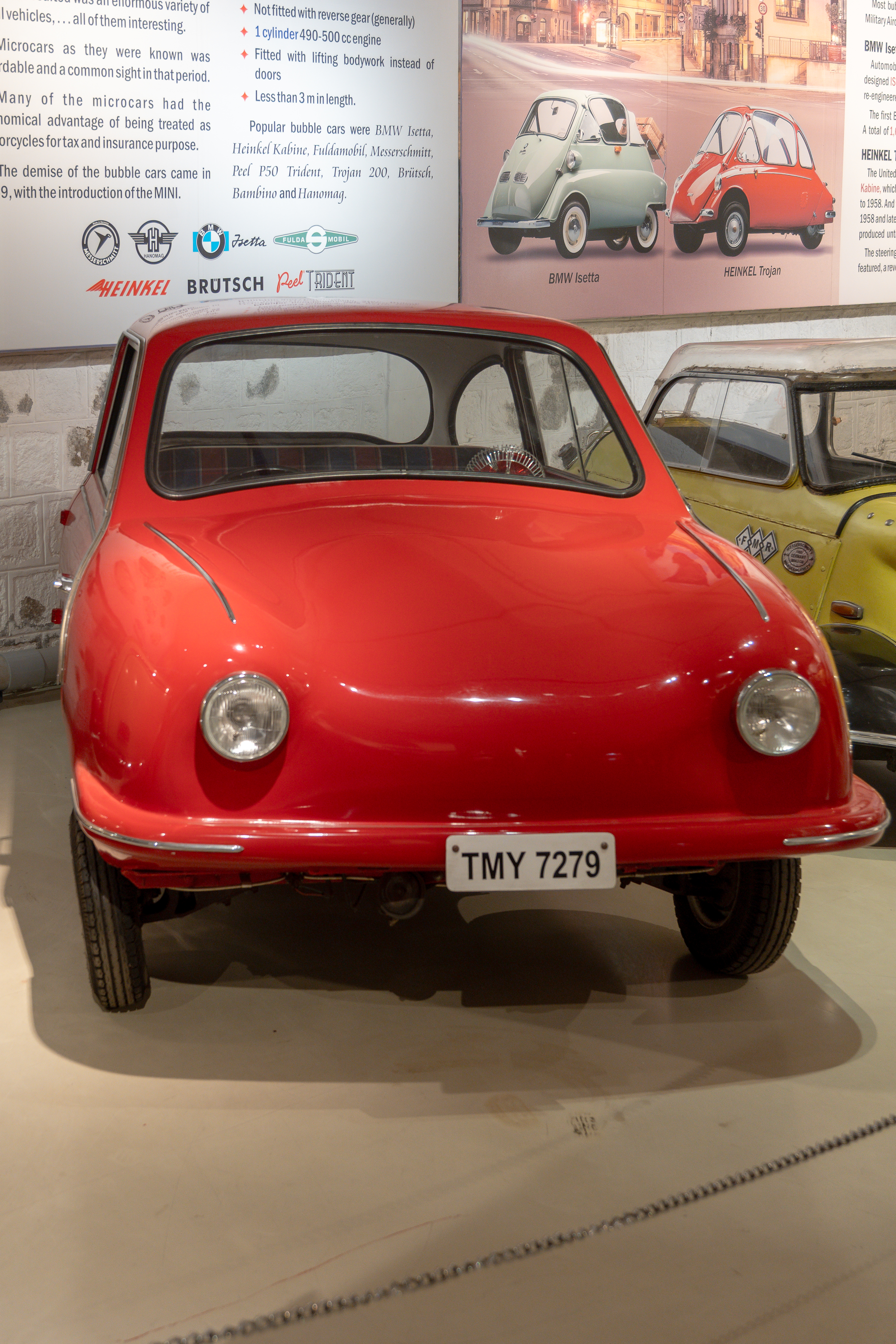
Scootacar, manufactured by Scootacar Pvt. Ltd, Renigunta,Andhra Pradesh, India; at the Gedee Car Museum, Coimbatore, TN, India

Many attempts were made by Karl Schmitt to sell licensed production of the Fuldamobil to different agents in various countries around the globe throughout the car's lifespan. Details of the majority of these arrangements are few, and vary from the licensing of complete manufacturing rights, to the supply of complete knock-down kits exported from the Fulda factory. Often the situation is further confused by direct exports of complete Fuldamobils from Fulda to the prospective licensees prior to and in the absence of the development of any localised production.

Cars produced under such arrangements were sold under a variety of names, such as the Nobel in Chile, UK and Turkey, the Bambi in Argentina, the Bambino in the Netherlands, Fram King Fulda (Usually abbreviated to FKF and later shortened to King) in Sweden, Attica and also Alta A200 in Greece, and Scootacar in India. It was also manufactured in South Africa under the original German name, also Zimbabwe then Rhodesia (see photo of news article). A pickup version called "Sporty" based on the coupé was also available in Argentina.

== Model Summary ==
except where stated

Model	Produced	Body style	Body construction	Seating	Engine	Transmission	Track	Wheelbase	Dimensions L x W x H	Kerb Weight	Fuel Tank Capacity	Top Speed	Price New	Tyre Size	Wheels	No.
Prototype	March 1950	2 door Coupé, Flat, sloping front, without indent for windshield	Sheet steel bodywork, (Note: Most sources state sheet steel, while Schermer states hammered aluminium sheet.) nailed onto wooden frame	2 seats	Zündapp 198 cm^{3} Air-cooled single-cylinder 2-stroke	Integral 3-speed, no reverse	1200mm	1500mm	2720mm x 1400mm x 1320mm	310 kg	10 liters	65 km/h	1850 DM (planned)	4.00-8	3	1
Prototype (Note: Rosellen discusses this prototype on page 54, but it is omitted from his data tables)	Christmas 1950	Roadster (Note: Rosellen describes this cars as having no doors and a small nose, Thyssen-Bornemissza states it has two side doors.)			Baker & Pölling 200 cm^{3} Air / blower-cooled single-cylinder 2-stroke	Hurth 3-speed, with reverse		Unclear (Note: Rosellen states the wheelbase was now 1000mm instead of 1500mm, Thyssen-Bornemissza states it was increased from 1000mm to 1500mm.)								1
N	February 1951 to June 1951	2 door Coupé, or 2 door Roadster, Style varied from car to car: early cars flat, sloping front, without indent for windshield later rounded front with indent	Construction varied from car to car:Aluminium sheet nailed to wood frame, Plywood sheet nailed to wood frame, Plywood sheet clad with leathercloth nailed to wood frame	2 seats	Baker & Pölling 248 cm^{3} Air / blower-cooled single-cylinder 2-stroke	Hurth 3-speed, with reverse	1200mm	1500mm (flat front) or 1800mm (rounded)	2720mm x 1400mm x 1320mm	320 kg	17 liters	75 km/h	2250 DM	4.00-8	3	48 total (26 Coupé, 22 Roadster)
N	June 1951 to August 1951	2 door Coupé, or 2 door Roadster, All with rounded front	Plywood bodywork clad with leathercloth nailed to wood frame	2 seats	Baker & Pölling 248 cm^{3} Air / blower-cooled single-cylinder 2-stroke	Hurth 3-speed, with reverse	1200mm	1800mm	2720mm x 1400mm x 1320mm	320 kg	17 liters	75 km/h	2250 DM	4.00-8	3	26 total
N-1	August 1951 to September 1952	2 door Coupé, or 2 door Roadster, rounded front	Plywood bodywork clad with leathercloth nailed to wood frame	2 seats	Baker & Pölling 248 cm^{3} Air / blower-cooled single-cylinder 2-stroke	Hurth 3-speed, with reverse	1200mm	1800mm	2850mm x 1397mm x 1280mm	315 kg	17 liters	75 km/h	2490 DM	4.00-8	3	320 (approx)
N-2	September 1952 to August 1955	2 door Coupé, or 2 door Roadster, rounded front	Hammered aluminium sheet nailed to wood frame or for an extra charge, smooth, painted aluminium sheet	2 seats	Fichtel & Sachs 359 cm^{3} Air / blower-cooled single-cylinder 2-stroke	Hurth 3-speed, with reverse	1200mm	1800mm	2850mm x 1397mm x 1280mm	305 kg	17 liters	80 km/h	2760 DM, from July 1953 2990 DM, from June 1954 2200 DM	4.00-8	3	380 (approx)
S-1 or licence built as NWF 200	from March 1954 to August 1955	2 door Coupé, rounded front	Aluminium body with steel frame and plywood floor	2 + 2 seats	ILO 197 cm^{3} Air / blower-cooled single-cylinder 2-stroke	Hurth 3-speed, with reverse	1240mm	1800mm	2970mm x 1470mm x 1330mm	375 kg	17 liters	80 km/h	2780 DM	4.00-8	3	3 Fulda, 701 NWF
S-2 (S 360)	November 1954 to August 1955	2 door Coupé, rounded front	Aluminium body with steel frame and plywood floor	2 + 2 seats	Fichtel & Sachs 359 cm^{3} Air / blower-cooled single-cylinder 2-stroke	Hurth 3-speed, with reverse	1240mm	1800mm	2970mm x 1470mm x 1330mm	375 kg	17 liters	80 km/h	2990 DM, from July 1955 3350 DM	4.00-8	3	430 (approx)
S-3	(Experimental models: built in February 1956)	2 door Coupé, rounded front	Aluminium body with steel frame and plywood floor	2 + 2 seats	Fichtel & Sachs 191 cm^{3} Air / blower-cooled single-cylinder 2-stroke	Integral 4-speed, with electrically switched reverse	1240mm	1800mm	2970mm x 1470mm x 1330mm	360 kg	18 liters	85 km/h	n/a	4.00-8	3	2
S-4	September 1955 to October 1956	2 door Coupé, rounded front	Aluminium body with steel frame and plywood floor	2 + 2 seats	Fichtel & Sachs 191 cm^{3} Air / blower-cooled single-cylinder 2-stroke	Integral 4-speed, with electrically switched reverse	1240mm	1900mm	3100mm x 1470mm x 1330mm	390 kg	18 liters	85 km/h	2780 DM	4.00-8	4 (3 on request)	168
S-6	October 1956 to June 1957	2 door Coupé, rounded front	Aluminium body with steel frame and plywood floor	2 + 2 seats	Fichtel & Sachs 191 cm^{3} Air / blower-cooled single-cylinder 2-stroke	Integral 4-speed, with electrically switched reverse	1240mm	1900mm	3100mm x 1470mm x 1330mm	375 kg	18 liters	80 km/h	2890 DM	4.00-8	4 (3 on request)	123
S-7	1957–1965	2 door Coupé or "Sporty" Roadster pickup, rounded front	Fibreglass body with plywood floor	2 + 2 seats or 2 seats (Sporty)	Fichtel & Sachs 191 cm^{3} Air / blower-cooled single-cylinder 2-stroke	Integral 4-speed, with electrically switched reverse	1220mm	2100mm	3150mm x 1450mm x 1350mm	320 kg	18 liters	80 km/h	3100 DM	4.00-8	4 (3 on request)	440 (approx)
S-7	October 1965 to spring 1969	2 door Coupé, rounded front	Fibreglass body with plywood floor	2 + 2 seats	Heinkel 198 cm^{3} Air / blower-cooled single-cylinder 2-stroke	Integral 4-speed, with electrically switched reverse	1220mm	2100mm	3150mm x 1450mm x 1350mm	330 kg	18 liters	85 km/h	3450 DM	4.00-8	4 (3 on request)	260 (approx)

== See also ==
- List of microcars by country of origin

== Bibliography ==
- de Lange, Jan (2000), Dwergauto's (in Dutch), Zaltbommel: Europese Bibliotheek, ISBN 902882619X
- de Lange, Jan (2005), Microcar stories, Toulouse: Drivers, ISBN 2952049181
- Marshall, Tony (2001), More Microcars, Stroud: Sutton Publishing, ISBN 0750926686
- Rees, Chris (1995), Microcar Mania, Oxfordshire: Bookmarque Publishing, ISBN 1870519183
- Rosellen, Hanns Peter (1983), Deutsche Kleinwagen (in German), Fulda: Bleicher Verlag, ISBN 3883501530
- Schermer, Manfred (1998), Dad dritte Rad - Geschichten des Fuldamobils (in German), Fulda: Verlag Parzeller GmbH & Co, ISBN 379000300X
- Thyssen-Bornemissza, Baron Hanns-Peter (1989), Europäische Kleinwagen 1945 - 1955 (in German), Frankfurt: Zyklam Verlag, ISBN 3887671015
- Thyssen-Bornemissza, Baron Hanns-Peter (1996), Europäische Kleinwagen 1956 - 1965 (in German), Mainz: Rabenstein-Verlag, ISBN 3929712032
- Zeichner, Walter (1990), Kleinwagen International (in German), Fulda: Bleicher Verlag, ISBN 3883501603
