= List of Mini-based cars =

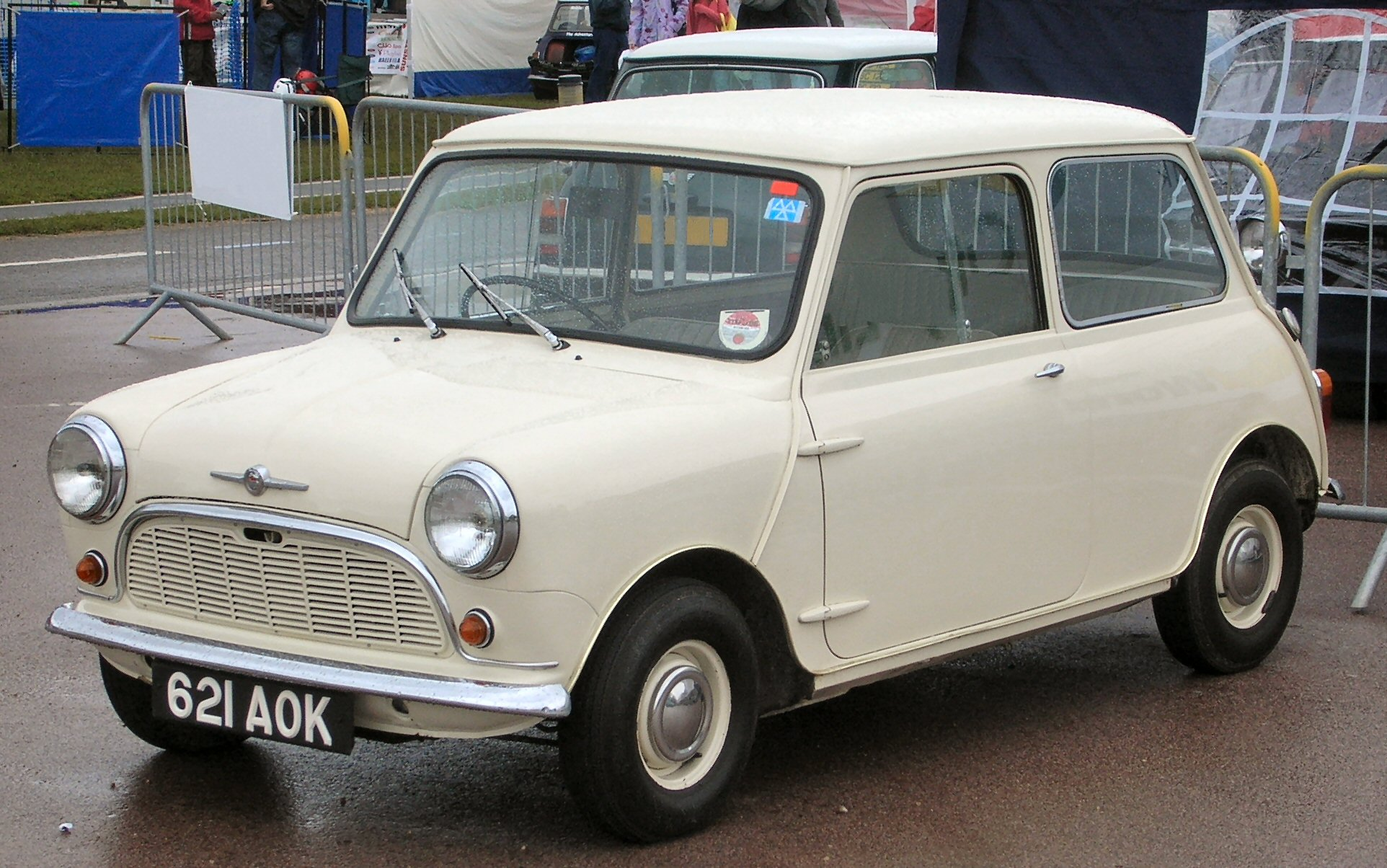
The Morris Mini spawned numerous variants around the world

The British Motor Corporation's Mini has been used as the basis for numerous kit cars and specials. Some are designed to look like the rare Mini Moke. Below is a partial list. There may be duplicates in this list as several cars emerged more than once from companies under different ownership.

== Australia ==
- BROADSPEED (BRIAN FOLEY MOTORS) Sports GT
- Bulanti MINI Sports GT
- DES HIGGINS MOTORBODIES Ecurie-Dedez Mini GT
- LOLITA AUTOMOBILE DEVELOPMENTS Sports MK1, Racer MK2
- NOTA Engineering, Nota Fang Sports
- Pellandini Cars
- PROJECT-X Sports GT
- S&A Minisprint (Stewart & Ardern Coachworks) S&A Mini Sprint GT
- TAYLORSPEED Minijem Sports GT

== Belgium ==
- MÉAN Sonora GT

== Canada ==
- REPTUNE Sports GT

== Denmark ==
- SEKURA Coupe Sports

== France ==
- HRUBON Phaeton
- HRUBON La Puce & Schmitt Funcars
- SIMCA Barquette 1300 GTR

== Germany ==
- COMminiCATION Elektrofahrzeuge GmbH (Mini based Electric Cars) MINI Convertible
- MARTINI MOTORSPORT Coupe GT
- WESTWOOD ENGINEERING Mini-Moke replica

== Italy ==
- CAGIVA Mini Moke 1000 (1980s-1990s)
- ESAP Minimach GT
- Innocenti 90L and 120L
- INNOCENTI Mini Mare
- MICHELOTTI Coachworks Mini
- PININFARINA ADO-34 GT
- ZAGATO Minigatto Sports GT

== Japan ==
- Mooncraft Moke Sport

== Malaysia ==
- Morris Harimau

== New Zealand ==
- De Joux MINI GT
- IBIS ENGINEERING Convertible

== Portugal ==
- AURORA-BMC 1300 GT Racecar
- IMA Austin Mini-Moke 1100
- IMA 1000 Mini-Van, Mini-IMA Estate

== South Africa ==
- BANSHEE Cooper Targa
- JACKSON Sportster Cabriolet

== Switzerland ==
- HOLINGER-SOLAR Mini Evergreen Cabriolet

== United Kingdom ==
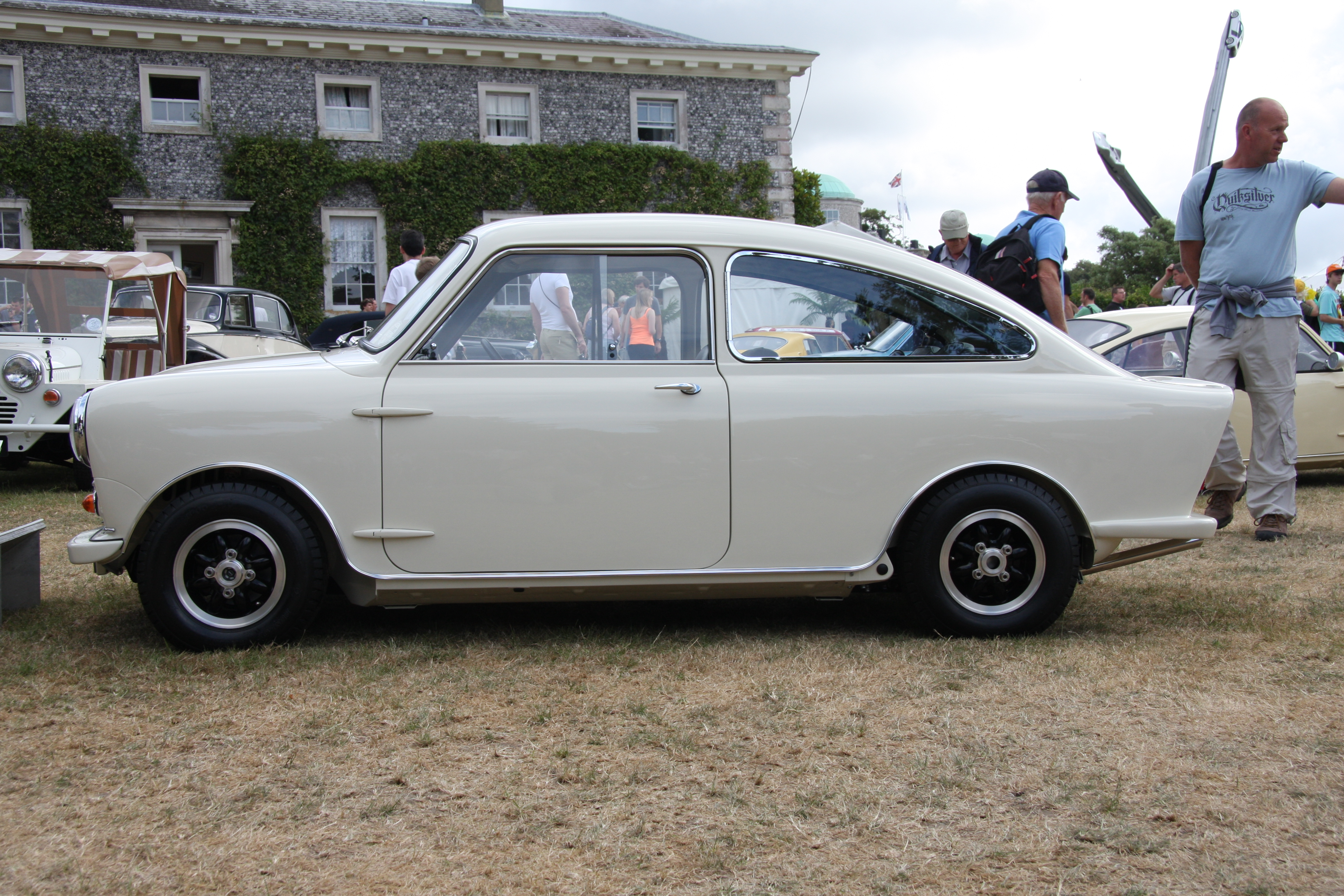
1965 Broadspeed GT

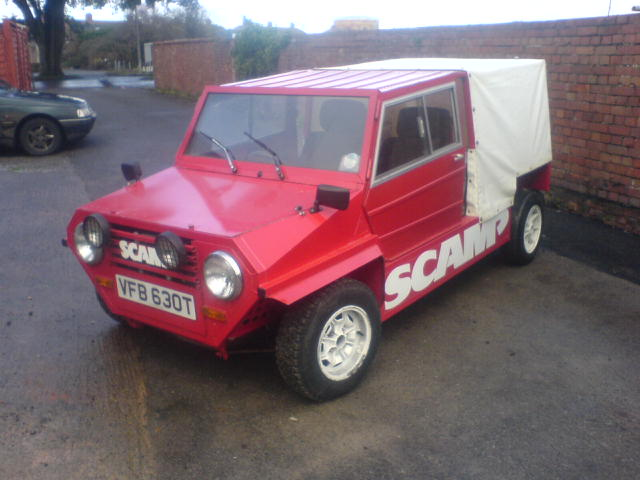
Mini SCAMP invented by Robert Mandry

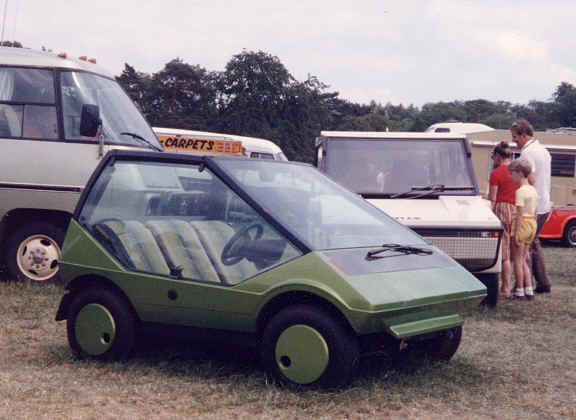
William Towns designed Microdot City Car project

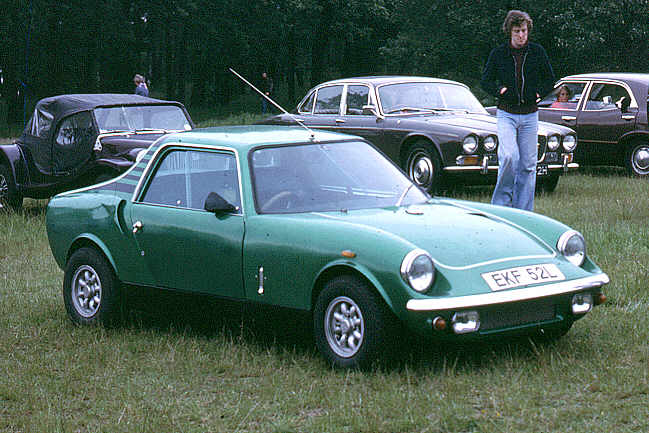
GTM mid-engined car, uses Mini front sub frames front and rear.

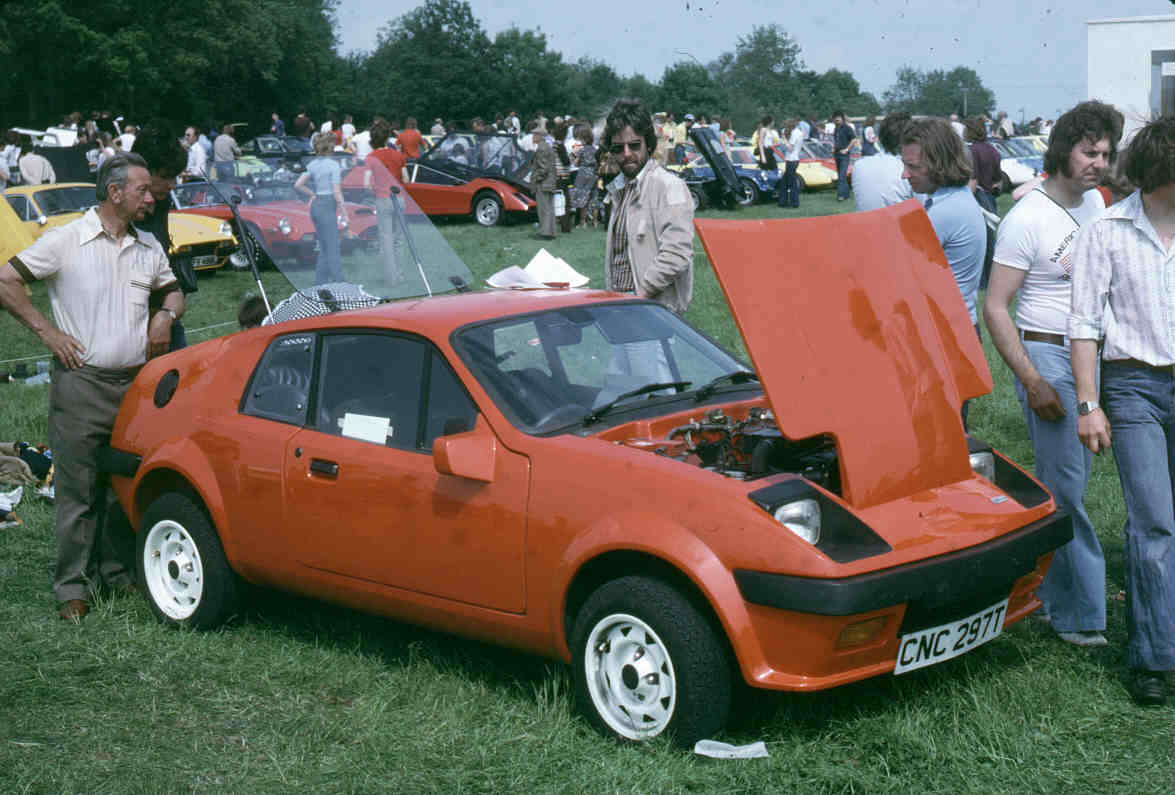
The Midas. A development of the Mini Marcos available as either a kit or fully assembled car.

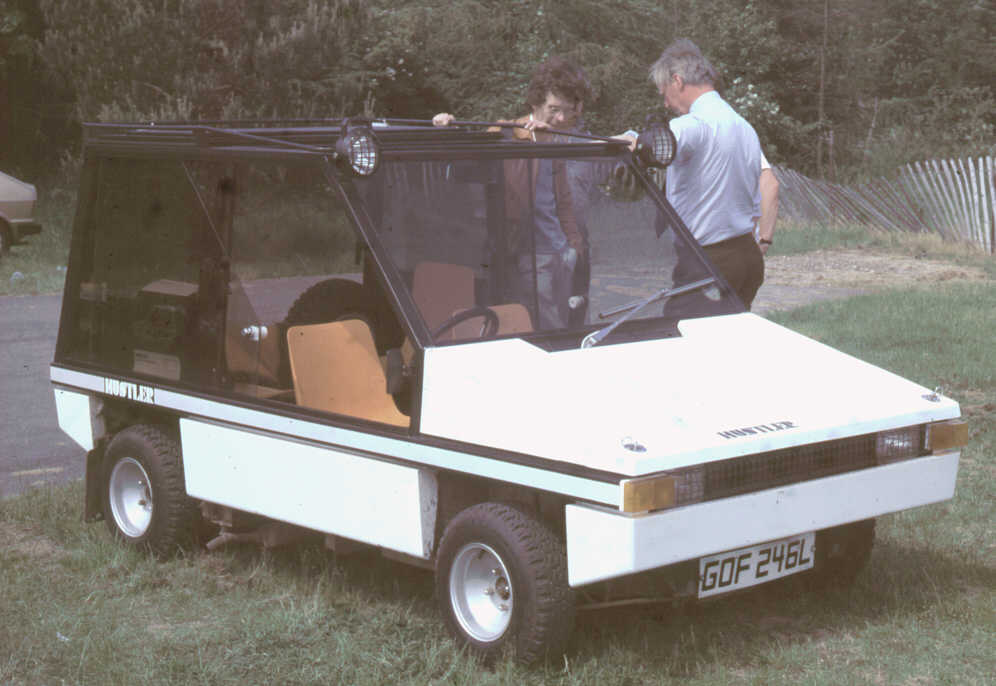
The Hustler 4

- 356 SPORTS LIMITED Sprint Convertible, Sprint Coupe
- ABC Tricar

(Built from 1968 to 1975 by Auto Bodycraft Conversions: William (Bill) Powell & Ken Heather at the Pensnett Trading Estate, Kingswinford, Staffordshire)

- ABS MOTORSPORT Sprint GT Peel Viking replicas
- AC Donington and Grand Prix
- ALTO Duo
- ANDERSEN MOTOR CO Cub
- ASP 1300S racing car
- AURORA (GEAR & RACING LTD) 1100 Race car
- AUTOCARS Marcos
- AUTOCOM Minibuggy
- BAL Salamander Roadster
- BANHAM CONVERSIONS Sprint
- BARRIAN CARS LTD Stimson Safari Six Funcars
- BERKELEY CARS Bandini Cabriolet
- BIOTA Sports GT MK1 & MK2
- BIRCHALL AUTOMOTIVE McCoy GT
- BORO Sports GT
- BROADSPEED Sports GT
- BUTTERFIELD Engineering, Butterfield Musketeer GT
- ONYX CARS Bobcat Buggy
- BOXER CARS Sports
- BROOKLANDS Swallow 3 wheeler
- Brookwell Trifid
- BUFI Mowog
- CAMAROTTA Convertible
- CAMBER CARS LTD/CHECKPOINT LIMITED Camber Sports GT
- CAPRICORN Willys-Jeep lookalike
- CAVALLO CARS LTD Cavallo Estivo GT
- CHRISTOPHER Mini Cabriolet
- CJC Bison Sports GT
- CIRRUS Buggy
- CODFORD Sports GT
- COLDWELL Sports GT
- COOPER-Bertone Mini 1100
- COSTIN Targa Sports GT
- COX & CO LTD, COX-GTM Sports
- CRAYFORD Mini Convertible
- Curley trike
- D.A.R.T. or DART Sports GT
- DAVENPORT Sports GT
- Davrian Sports MK7 & Sports MK8
- Deep Sanderson 105 Racecar & 301 Sports GT
- Domino Pimlico Cabriolet
- DOUGAL Bug Open buggy
- DRAGSPORT CARS LTD Sarcon Scarab Sports GT
- ELSWICK Envoy Citycar
- ERA Mini Turbo GT
- EUXTON Caraboot Special
- FELLPOINT LIMITED MINIJEM MK2/MK3 Sports GT
- FIREBALL Midget Racer
- FLETCHER Sports GT
- FOERS Nomad Utility & Triton Estate
- FRA ENGINEERING LTD Sports GT
- FRENETTE CARS Californian 1100
- ABS Freestyle
- AUTOBARN Gecko
- GITANE Sports GT
- GNAT CARS Sports
- GOA CARS
- GT EQUIPMENT COMPANY Minisprint saloon, Walker-GTR
- GTM (was Cox GTM)
- Heinz 57 Crayford Convertible
- ASD Hobo buggy
- HOLLIER Mosquito Buggy
- HOOPER Mini Estate Ambulances
- HUFFAKER-BMC 1100 Racing car
- Hustler (see also William Towns)
- JEDI Stiletto Racing car
- JIFFY Pickup Truck
- JIMINI AUTOMOBILE CO LTD Funcars
- JKD Austin-Mini Racing car
- KAIG Funcars
- KILLEEN K16 Sports
- KINGFISHER MOTORS LTD, Sprint GT
- LAMBERT Mokette Funcar
- LANDAR COMPONENTS LTD R6 /R7 Racing cars
- LAWTHER Sports GT
- Leonhardt Tiger (A mid engine 1990s modern Messerschmitt KR200 replica kitcar)
- LIGHTSPEED-PANELS Magenta
- SELF-FIT Lunabug Buggy
- HOMEBUILTS Lynx Estate
- MACINTOSH DESIGN LTD M1/M2/M3 Sports
- MAGUIRE Clubman GT
- MALLOCK MK14 Racing car
- Many Mego

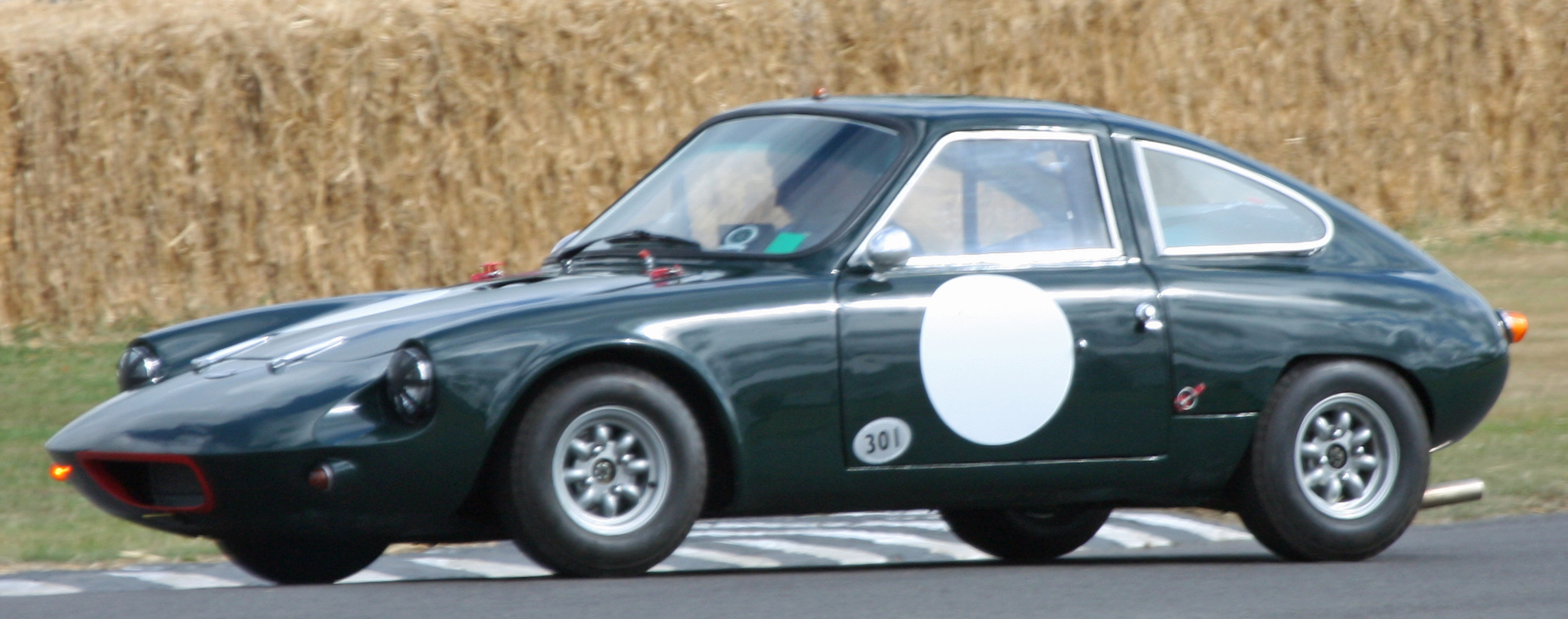
Deep Sanderson 301, competed at the 1963 24 Hours of Le Mans

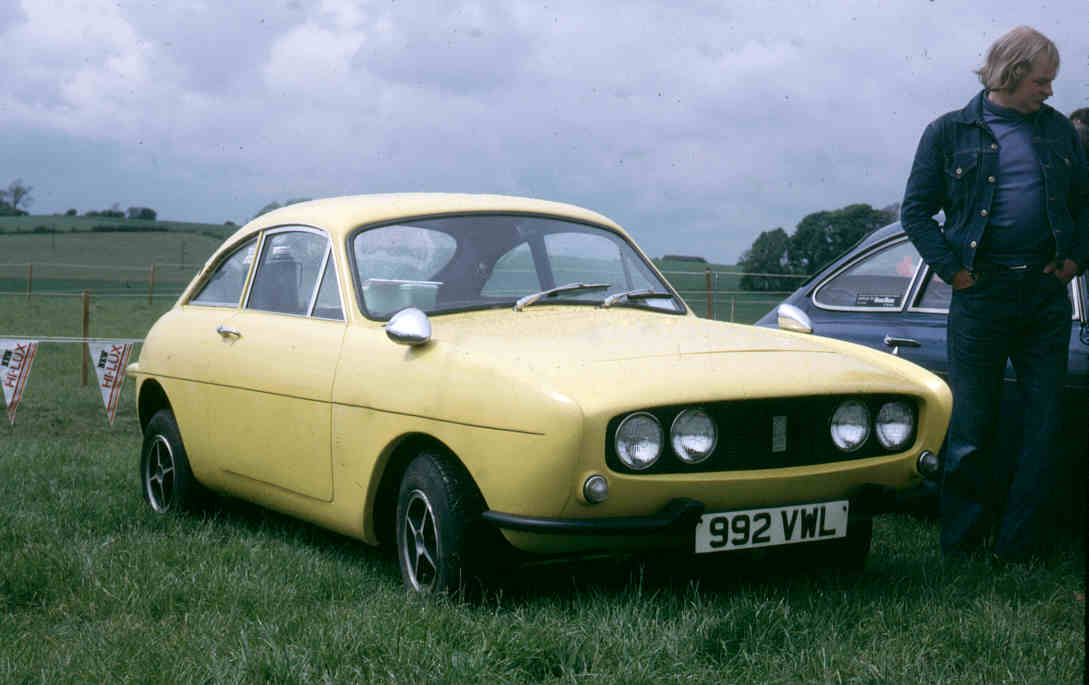
Ogle SX1000 in 1980

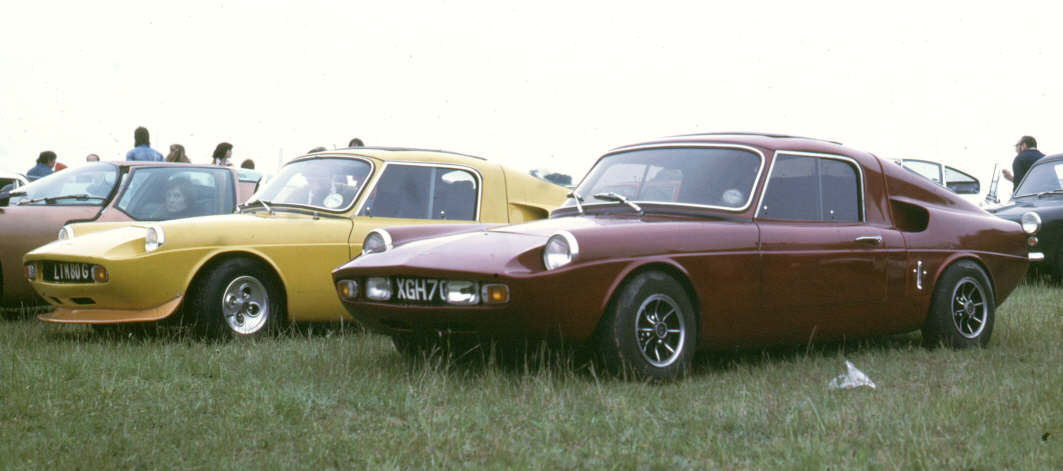
Two Unipowers in 1977

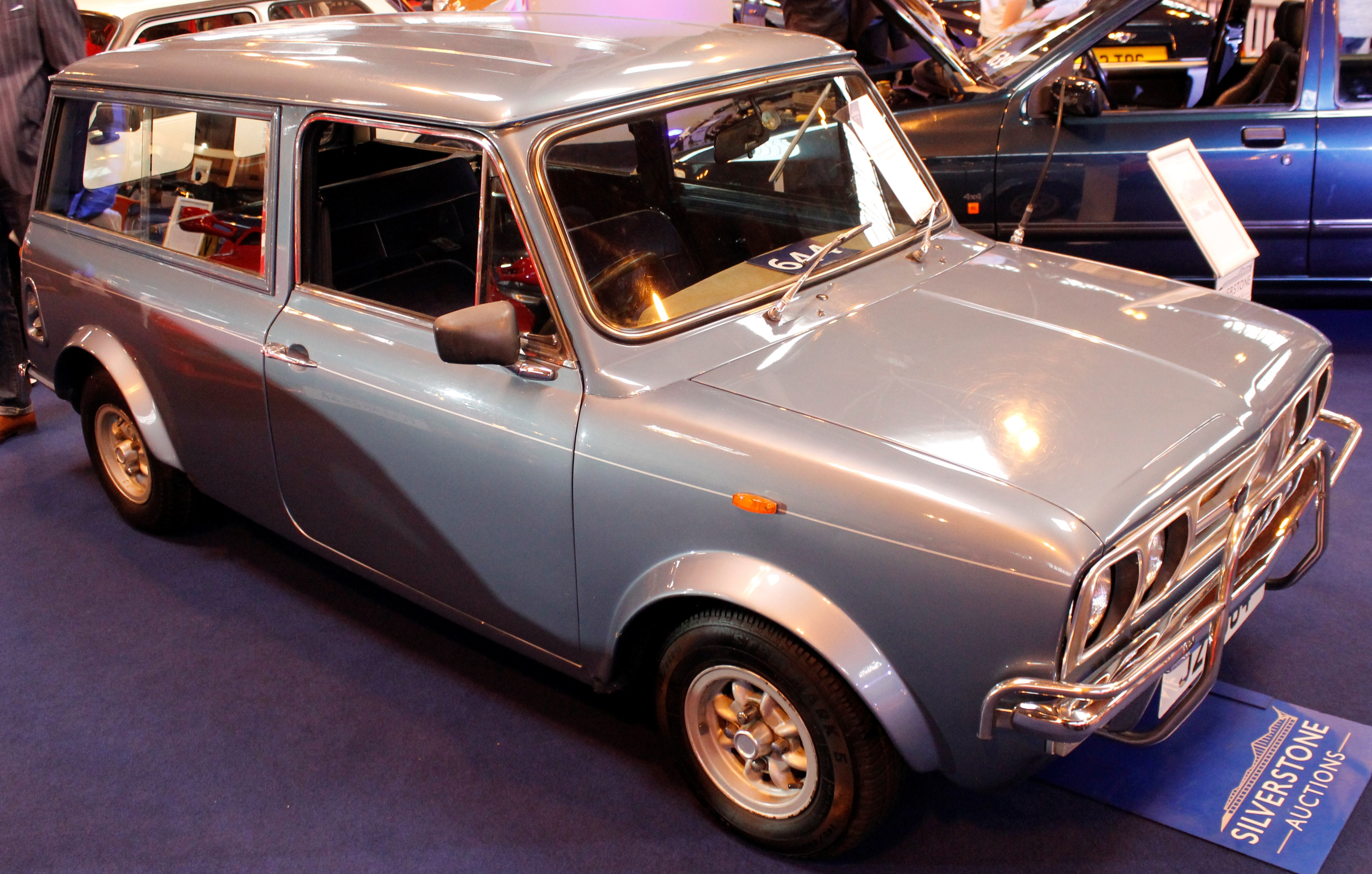
Wood & Pickett Mini Clubman

- MARCOS CARS LTD Mini Marcos GT MK Series
- MARCOS HERITAGE LIMITED Mini Marcos GT
- MAYA Sports GT
- McCoy
- Microdot
- METRON Sports GTR 1300
- MG Wasp Sports GT
- MICRON CARS LTD Sports GT
- Midas Bronze & Gold
- MIDTEC Sports GT
- MINETTE CARS Citycar
- Mini Beach Car
- IGM Mini Bug
- Mini Daly Runabout
- Mini Jaba
- JEM CARS Mini Jem GT, Estate
- Mini Land Rover Estate
- ASD Minim
- Mini Marcos
- Mini Scamp
- Minissima
- MINNOW (Coachbuilders) Estate
- MINUS CARS WK LTD Maxi Estate & Minus Mini
- MOKO
- MOORLAND MK1 Racing car
- Mosquito
- NAUTICA Elf GTR 4WD Rover-Engined
- LANGRIDGE ENGINEERING Navajo Utility
- NCF MOTORS LTD Blitz Buggies
- NERUS Sports GTR
- NIFTY CARS Estate 1100
- NIMBUS-COOPER BMC DPS (Don Parker Special)
- NIMBUS CARS Coupe Sports
- NOOVOH DEVELOPMENTS Stimson buggies & cars
- TACCO Nimrod Buggy
- NORTHLIGHT K4 Sports GT
- NOSTALGIA CARS LTD NC 1000, NC 1100 GT, NC 1300 GTR
- NOTA ENGINEERING UK LTD (1970s) Fang Cabriolet
- Ogle SX1000
- OYLER Coachworks Contessa
- PENN GARAGE-FELLPOINT Minijem GT MK1
- Peel Viking
- PHOENIX AUTOMOTIVE Clubman Estate
- PRIMO DESIGNS LTD GTM Coupe, GTM Cabriolet
- UNIVERSAL POWER DRIVES LTD Quasar-Unipower Cube car
- RADFORD Coachworks Mini Deville
- RANGER MOTOR CO Cub Utility
- REEVES Matrix 3 wheeler
- RIDGWAY Scorpion GT
- ROAMER Utility
- RSR (Rally Sport Replicas) Austin Sprite Frogeye, Mini-Moke
- SCAMP RTV 4X4
- SCAMP MOTOR CO Utility models
- SABRE CARS Sports
- Sabre Sprint
- SABRINA Roadster 1100
- SAGA Sports GT
- SARCON LIMITED Whippingham Wrogue Racecar
- AEM Scout
- SEAGULL CARS Roadster
- SHIKARI CARS Safari Funcars
- SIVA ENGINEERING Mini buggy
- SIVA MOTOR CO Mule Funcar
- SILHOUETTE RACING Sports GT
- SKIP 1000 3-wheeler
- LIGHTSPEED-PANELS Sprint Cabriolet
- STATUS MOTOR COMPANY/BRIAN LUFF LTD Symbol Cabriolet, Sabot Convertible & 365 Saloon
- STIMSON CARS/BARRY STIMSON DESIGN Buggies & Funcars
- TH ENGINEERING LTD Freestyle Buggy
- TERRAPIN RACING LTD Terrapin
- TICI SALES LTD TiCi City car
- TIGER Wheeler Sports GT
- TIMEIRE Sports GTR
- TMC Scout
- ONYX CARS Tomcat Buggy
- INTERSTYL TXC Tracer Cabriolet
- Triad
- Trimin
- TRIMINI Cabriolet 3 wheeler
- TRIAD Mosquito 3 wheeler
- TRIO BMC 3 wheeler
- Twini
- UNIVERSAL POWER DRIVES LTD Unipower GT
- VIKING PERFORMANCE LTD Peel Sports GT
- Westfield TRZ
- WHITBY ENGINEERING Mini-Warrior
- Mini Wildgoose
- WOOD & PICKETT Coachbuilt Minis
- WYNES-BIRCHALL McCoy Sports
- GRANTURA Yak

== United States ==
- SURFITE Buggy

== Venezuela ==
- Facorca Minicord

In early 1990 in Facorca (Fábrica de Motores y Carrocerías Cordillera) in the factory located on Mariara (Carabobo State, Venezuela), have the idea of building Minis made of Fiber-Glass is gestated.

After more than a year, in April 1990 an agreement is reached with RoverGroup Ltd. to obtain support, technical supervision, and to provide all the mechanical parts as well as all electric components, Facorca would assume the body, interior trim, radiator, radio, wheels, and tires. The factory molds itself for a maximum production of 10 cars per day, but the normal production would eventually become of 6 cars per day.

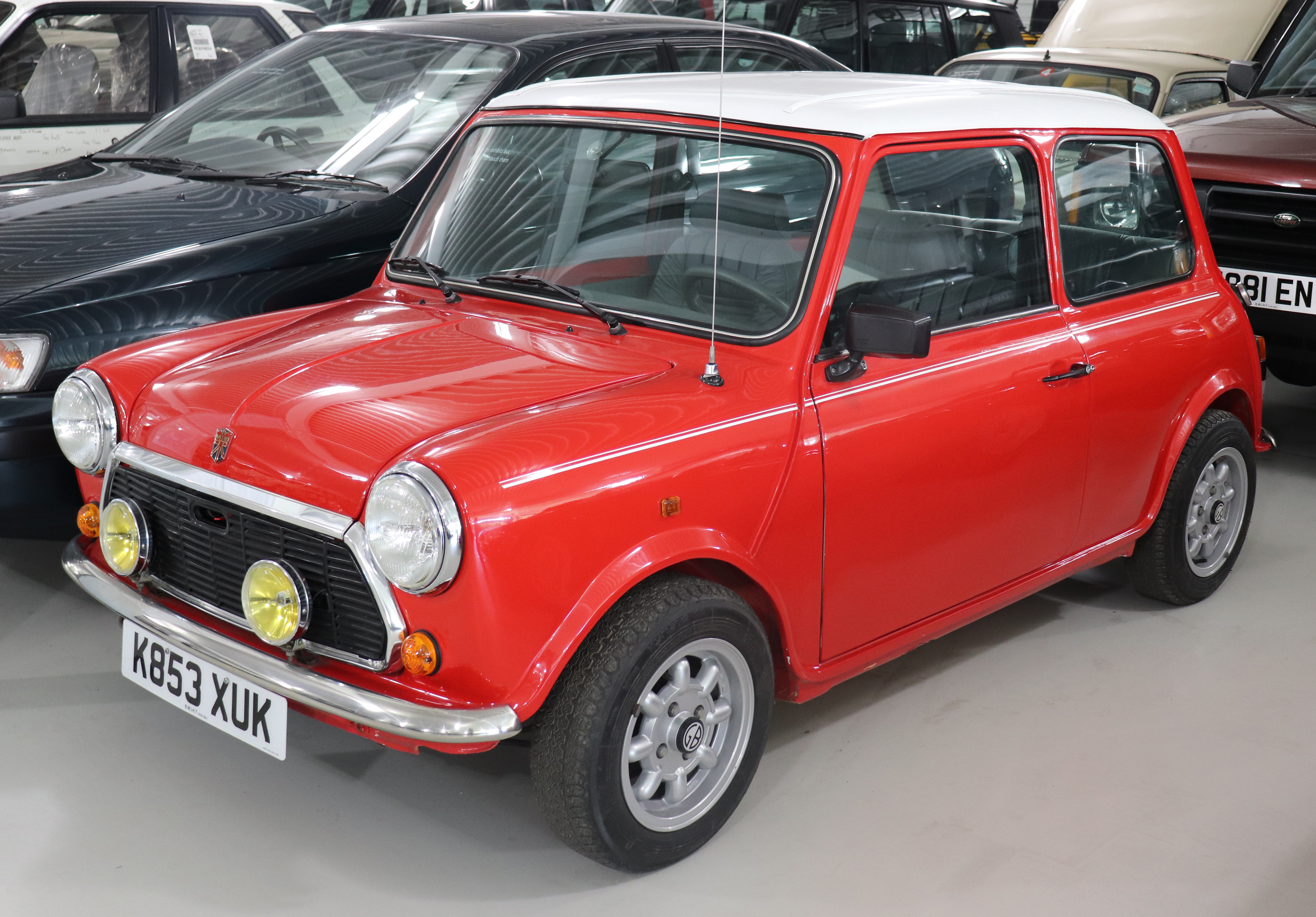
1992 Mini Cord built with a glass-fibre body in Venezuela

In December 1991, the series production commences, assembling total of 113 Mini Cord on that month. Two basic models with 1000cc enter the market (the project of launching a 1275cc engine was never achieved): The Mini Cord FA, deluxe version, which brought amongst other things, air conditioning, complete leather interior trim, central console with tachometer, chrome bumpers, spotlights, Minilite Type GB wheels; and the SB Mini Cord, Standard Version, with cloth interior trim, and steel wheels with deluxe wheel cups. All Colombian versions came with Minilite type GB wheels. In 1992 768 Mini Cords were produced, specifically for the Colombia, Venezuela, and Antilles market, of which 164 were imported to Colombia. That was the best year of production.

By 1993, a few improvements are made to both models, changing the interior trim to a better one, much more comfortable, original Rover rearview mirrors, and new design on the forward emblem.

The 1993 Production descends to 391 units, due to the different economical problems, and problems among the partners, which drive the Factory to an almost decisive shut down. 62 Units are officially imported to Colombia, and the Distributors in Colombia, Mini City, cease to function as well.

In 1994 it found itself in a very difficult financial situation, but the success in sales and of possible exportations to Colombia take the company to the hands of Abisaad Janna & Cia, to which become convinced (by the partners left at Facorca) to re-open production.

Projects of assembling Mini Cords restart, and two Beach Minis prototypes get to be built first, two unique convertibles, a conventional Mini with Kit Cooper 1.0 with 10-inch wheels, and another standard engine and Pimlico Style.

Together with those, the Mini Cord with John Cooper 1.0 Kit deluxe is launched, with 13 inch Revolution wheels, Three-Clock-Central Drive Board, and Leather Interior. All should have been silver, although, because of special requests, some were painted otherwise, on other colors.

The total production with Cooper and the standard versions by 1994 was of 24 units a great deal of these series reach Colombia, and all this due to the Economical situation of Facorca. This takes Abisaad Jana & Cia, to cancel their contract.

In 1995 only 16 units are assembled and commences the dismantling the installations.

Between the years 1991 and 1995, only 1310 Mini Cord were produced, in the standard and the Deluxe Version, Cooper and Convertibles, which takes it to be the smallest or at least of the smallest Mini Productions of a Mini ever.
