= Quasar (disambiguation) =

Quasar (QSR: quasi-stellar radio source; QSO: quasi-stellar object) is an astronomical body producing vast amounts of energy, an energized galactic core

Quasar or variant, may also refer to:

== People ==
- Daniel Quasar, U.S. artist
- Quasar Thakore-Padamsee (born 1978), Indian stage actor turned theatre director & producer.
- Quasar Khanh (1934–2016), Vietnamese engineer
- GD Quasar (2001-), American YouTuber and Gamer

=== Fictional characters ===
- Quasar (character), several Marvel comic book characters
  - Quasar (Wendell Vaughn), a fictional superhero in Marvel Comics
- Johnny Quasar, a conceptual version of Jimmy Neutron, protagonist of the film and TV series

== Groups, companies, organizations ==
- Quasar (brand), a brand of electronics
- Quasar (Czech company), a hang glider manufacturer
- Quasar Data Products, U.S. computer company
- Quasar Technologies, a Finnish software company
- Quassar (callsign: QUASSAR), a defunct Mexican airline
- AeroTaxi (callsign: AIR QUASAR), a defunct Canadian airline; see List of defunct airlines of Canada

=== Musical groups ===
- Quasars Ensemble, Slovakian classical music ensemble
- Quasar (band), British neo-prog and progressive rock band formed in 1979

== Games and sports ==
- Quasar (laser tag), a laser tag system in the UK and Ireland, also known as Q-Zar
- Quasar (arcade game), a 1980 arcade game by Zaccaria
- Quasar (video game), a 1983 snake game for the Apple II computer

== Music ==
- Quasar (album), a 1985 album by Jimmy Giuffre
- "Quasar" (song), a 2012 song by The Smashing Pumpkins
- "Quasar" (song), a 1985 song, the title track from the eponymous Jimmy Guiffre album Quasar (album)
- "Quasar" (song), a song on Herbie Hancock's 1972 album Crossings

== Transportation and vehicles ==
- Quasar (satellite), a military satellite
- Quasar (motorcycle), a feet forward motorcycle with a hard top
- Aeroalcool Quasar, a Brazilian light aircraft
- Jean-Montet Quasar 200, a French acrobatic aircraft
- Peugeot Quasar, a 1984 concept car
- Quasar-Unipower, a British car

== Other ==
- Quasimidi Quasar, a sound synthesizer
- Quasar framework, open source app framework

== See also ==
- List of quasars
- Quasi-star, a type of star with a black-hole core
- Quaoar, a possible dwarf planet in the outer Solar System
- Qwaser (character class), a character type from the anime-manga cartoon-comic The Qwaser of Stigmata media franchise
- Quazar (disambiguation)
- Pulsar (disambiguation)
- QSO (disambiguation)
- QSR (disambiguation)
