= Unipower =

Unipower may refer to:

- Unipower GT
- Trucks produced by Universal Power Drives
