= AC 3000ME =

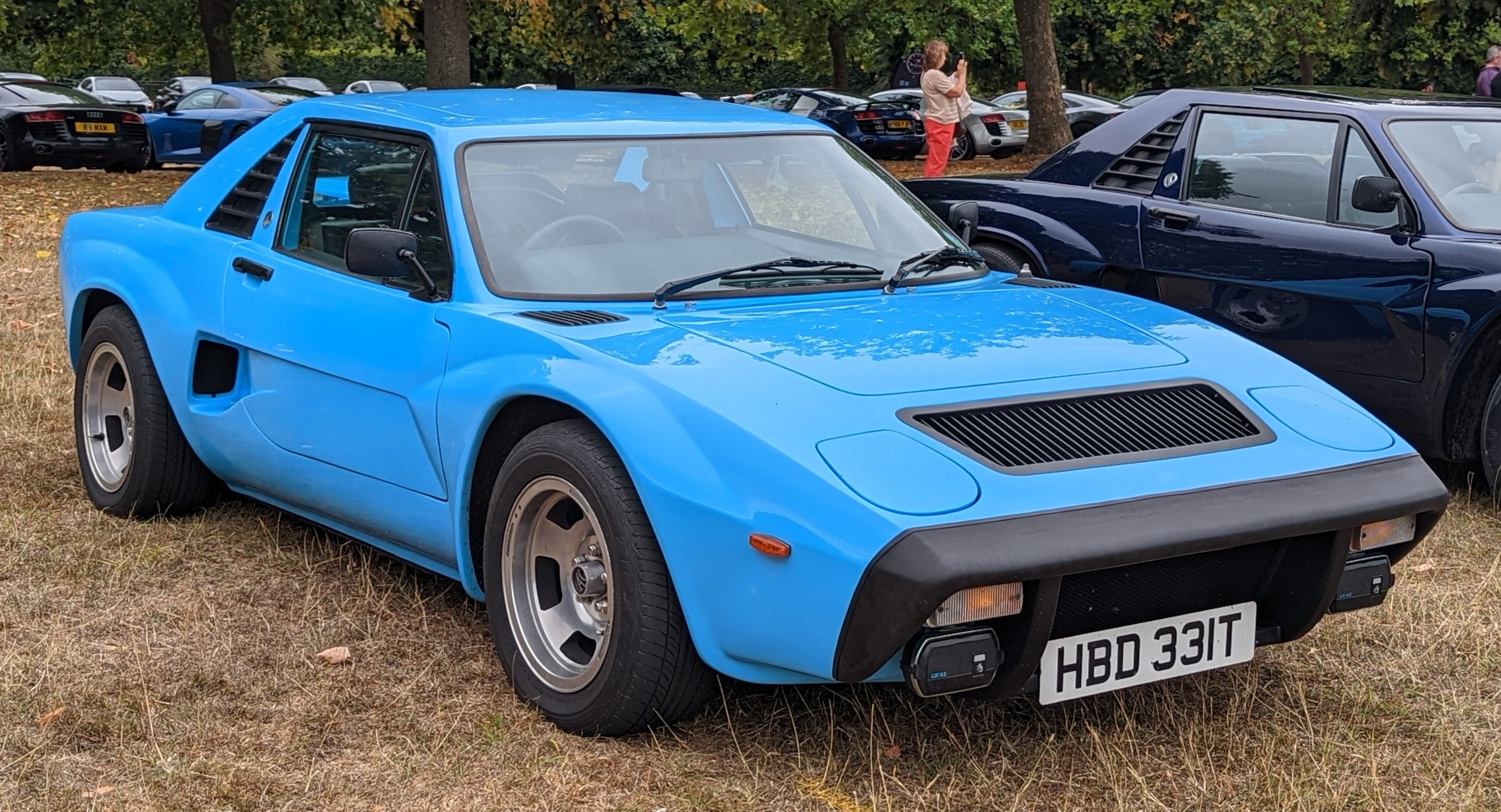

Overview
- Manufacturer: AC Cars; AC (Scotland) plc
- Also called: AC 3 Litre, AC 3000, AC ME3000
- Production: 1979–1984 (AC Cars); 1984–1985 (AC (Scotland) plc)
- Assembly: England: Thames Ditton; Scotland: Hillington
- Designer: Peter Bohanna; Robin Stables

Body and chassis
- Class: Sports car
- Body style: 2-door coupé
- Layout: MR layout with Transverse engine
- Platform: Custom steel perimeter frame

Powertrain
- Engine: 2,994 cc (182.7 cu in) Ford Essex V6
- Transmission: 5-speed manual

Dimensions
- Wheelbase: 2,300 mm (90.6 in)
- Length: 3,988 mm (157.0 in)
- Width: 1,651 mm (65.0 in)
- Height: 1,143 mm (45.0 in)
- Kerb weight: 1,085 kg (2,392.0 lb)

The AC 3000ME is a mid-engined sports car originally sold by AC Cars. The two-door coupé debuted at the 1973 London Motor Show. Sales did not begin until 1979 and lasted until 1984. Rights to the 3000ME and tooling were transferred to a second company which produced a small number of additional cars before going into receivership themselves in mid-1985. A third company acquired the rights to the car with plans to begin selling a revised version under a different name, but only a single prototype was ever produced.

== History ==
=== Origin ===
The AC 3000ME was based on a prototype called the Diablo built by the Bohanna Stables company and shown at the London Racing Car Show in 1972.

Peter Bohanna was an automotive body structures engineer. His experience included working with fibreglass structures as a boat engineer and a stint with Ford's Advanced Vehicle Operations in the UK doing bodywork for the Ford GT40. In late 1967 Bohanna was at Lola cars working on the T70, where he met Robin Stables, who prior to his arrival at Lola had been a racing mechanic and Lotus dealer.

In 1968, Bohanna and Stables won a design contract for a new sports car tendered by a young aristocrat named Piers Weld-Forester. The partners designed a two-seat mid-engined car to be powered by the 2.2 L inline six version of BMC's newly announced SOHC E-series engine, code-named ARO25. Production problems would delay release of this engine until 1972. In late 1968 Weld-Forester partnered with Ernie Unger to form a new company named UWF (for Unger Weld-Forester), and bought the Unipower GT production line from Universal Power Drives. Bohanna and Stables' subsequent work for UWF was to design a car to replace the existing Unipower GT, but this design would not reach production. Instead the partners started the Bohanna Stables company and resumed development of the earlier mid-engined design, which would become the Diablo.

The 1972 Diablo prototype was built with the 1.5 L inline four version of the E-series engine and 5-speed manual transaxle that was used in the Austin Maxi.

Bohanna Stables had sought interest from both AC and TVR before the Diablo was shown at the Racing Car Show, but neither company committed to the project. After the car's debut AC's Keith Judd drove the Diablo to the company's Thames Ditton headquarters and convinced AC owner Derek Hurlock to take the project on.

=== Development and production ===
AC acquired the rights to the Bohanna Stables Diablo design and assigned two of their engineers, Alan Turner and Bill Wilson, to develop it into a production car. AC also hired Bohanna and Stables to consult on the redesign. The Diablo's steel tubing spaceframe was completely re-engineered. A new engine had to be found for the car, as British Leyland expected to need all of the E-series engines produced at their Cofton Hackett factory for their own models. The substitute chosen was a Ford V6.

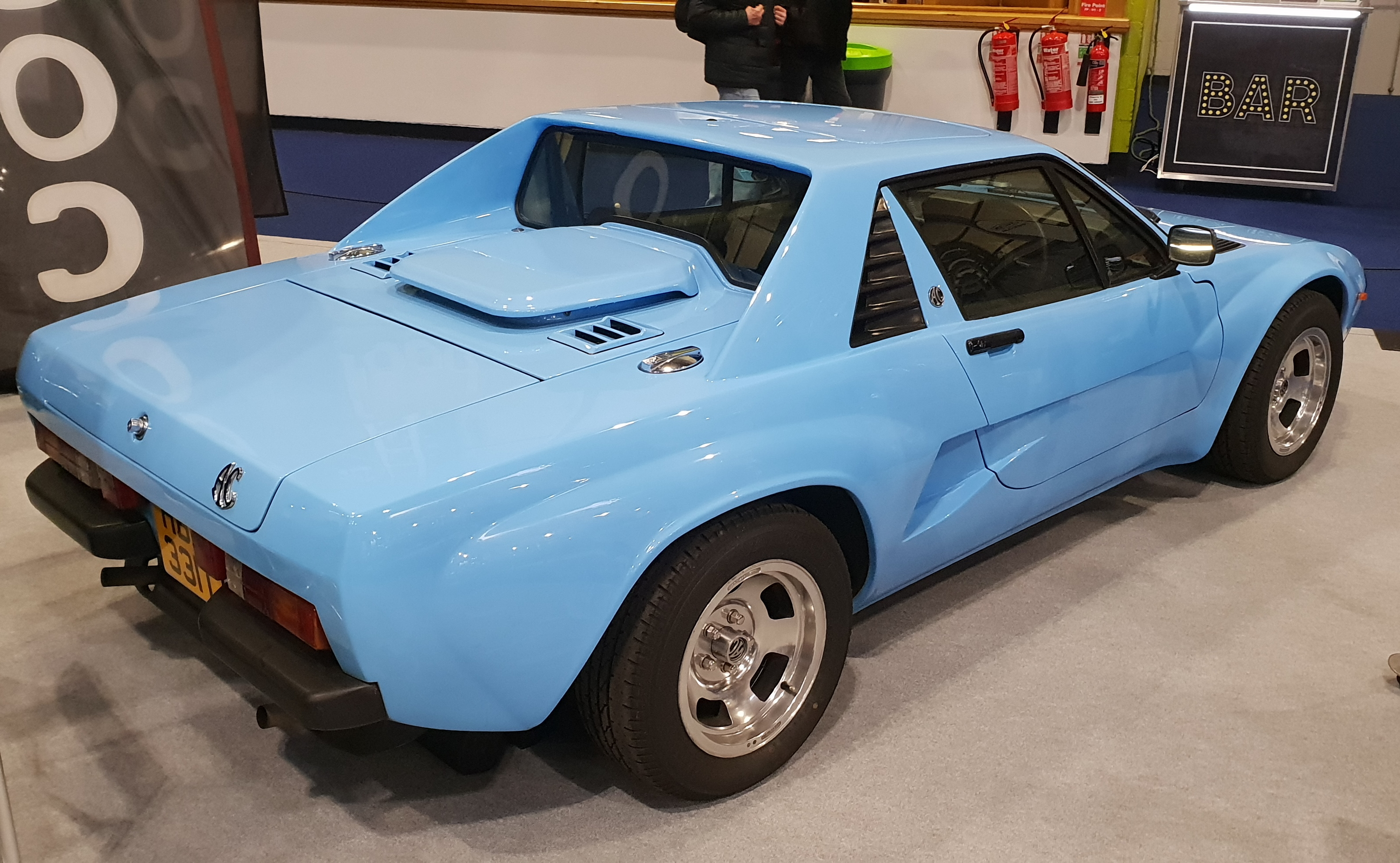
AC 3000ME rear

AC first showed their version of the car at the 1973 London Motor Show. This prototype was called the AC 3 Litre, or the AC 3000. Later pre-production prototypes were called the AC ME 3000. Press releases of the time indicated that the company hoped to be able to build and sell the car at the rate of 10 to 20 cars per week. AC suggested that pricing would to be somewhere between £3000 and £4000.

Even though the car debuted in 1973, development was still ongoing, with the car's styling not finalised until 1974. A prototype failed the 30 mph (48 km/h) crash portion of the new Type Approval tests that had been instituted in 1976, necessitating a chassis redesign. The revised chassis passed on the next attempt.

Several pre-production prototypes were built, with their number variously reported as eight, nine or eleven cars.

The car officially went on sale when it appeared at the 1978 NEC Motor Show. The name was now the "AC 3000ME". The list price for the car had risen to £11,300. The first customer cars were not delivered until 1979, by which time they had to compete with newer designs like the Lotus Esprit. The delays meant that the 3000ME was out of date by the time it reached production. Prices also continued to rise; a road test by Autocar magazine in March 1980 reported that the car cost £13,238. The same test expressed some reservations with the car's handling when pushed. Several other contemporary reviews expressed similar misgivings.

==== Turbocharging ====
As early as August 1975, AC was planning to offer a turbocharged version. The forced induction system was originally expected to be supplied by Broadspeed.

By 1980, turbocharged conversions were available, but from a company run by engineer and photographer Robin Rews rather than Broadspeed. Rews' conversion for semi-competition applications used a Garrett AiResearch turbocharger blowing through a 1½" Reece Fish carburettor mounted to a custom intake manifold. Boost was limited to 7.0 psi, and the compression ratio was reduced to 8:1 by the use of low-compression cylinder heads. A Bosch fuel pump supplied the system. Rews used Rotomaster turbochargers for regular road car conversions. The conversion raised power to 200 bhp (149.1 kW). Rews also modified the rear suspension geometry to add toe-in to improve the car's handling. 19 cars received turbocharger upgrades from Rews' Rooster Turbos company. Attempts to convince AC to offer the turbo conversion as a factory option were unsuccessful.

A road test of another turbo conversion in December 1983 shows that the Rooster Turbo conversion had evolved. The turbocharger was now an IHI unit, and while the "standard" turbo compression ratio was still 8:1, special pistons sourced from Cosworth would lower it even further to 7.2:1 to permit the use of higher boost. The carburettor for this later conversion was also the standard 3000ME unit, although like the earlier conversion it was a blow-through system. A waste-gate and a dump-valve handled boost control. The conversion cost £1180 until 1984, when prices rose to £2000.

Rew and Rooster Turbos also did at least one twin-turbo conversion. This engine used the Cosworth pistons, Weber carburretion and water injection to cool the intake charge. Output was estimated to have been 300 bhp (223.7 kW).

=== AC (Scotland) ===
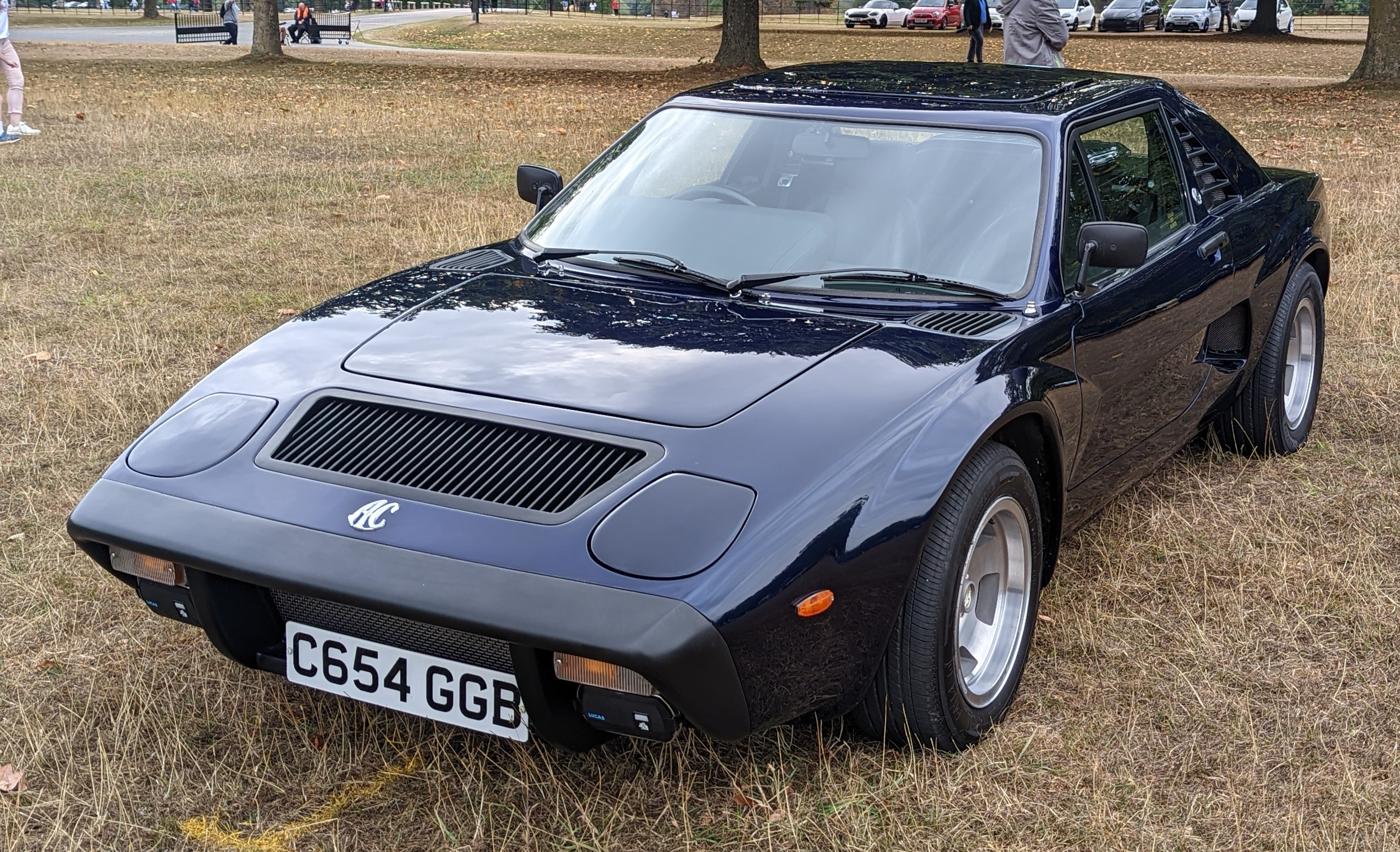
1985 AC 3000ME

By the early 1980s, Derek Hurlock's health had been poor for some time. The world economy was in difficulty, and sales of the 3000ME had never reached the volumes hoped for. After building fewer than 80 cars, Hurlock called a halt to production. In 1984, production stopped at Thames Ditton and the car and the AC name were licensed to a company registered as AC (Scotland) plc. This company was run by David McDonald, and operated out of a new factory in Hillington, Glasgow. Production goals were set at 40 cars per week. A total of 30 additional cars were built to the original 3000ME specification. The Scottish cars are distinguished from the Thames Ditton cars by their body-coloured air-intakes and grilles.

3000ME chassis #129, registration VPC 634X, which had previously served as both a factory demonstrator at AC and Managing Director Andrew Hurlock's personal ride, was used by AC (Scotland) as a development mule for an updated car. Aubrey Woods, a former BRM production engineer, was tasked with the related development. The original Ford engine was replaced by an Alfa Romeo 2.5-litre Busso V6 engine. While the original gearbox was retained, other parts of the running gear were swapped for Alfa parts. AC (Scotland) also began work on a Mark 2 prototype of the car, which was nearly complete at the time of the company's closing. Changes were also made to the suspension to eliminate the earlier car's unpredictable handling at the limit AC (Scotland) went into receivership in June 1985. The license agreement with AC Cars ended in November 1985.

== Technical features ==
=== Running gear ===
The chassis of the 3000ME was a perimeter frame whose central tub was made of folded sheet steel with an integrated roll-over bar. Some reviews of the car call the central tub a monocoque. Subframes were fitted at the front and rear. Bodywork was made of glass-reinforced plastic (GRP). Weight distribution was 40/60 front/rear.

The car's suspension comprised upper and lower A-arms with coil springs and telescopic shock-absorbers both front and rear. The configuration incorporated anti-dive/anti-squat geometry. The suspension arms and uprights were fabricated by AC. No anti-roll bars were fitted to production 3000MEs. The braking system used dual hydraulic circuits to activate a Girling caliper operating on an AC-made rotor at each wheel. Early tyres were 195/60VR-14 Pirellis, which later grew to 205/60VR-14 size mounted on 7 in (178 mm) wide alloy wheels from Wolfrace.

=== Engine and transaxle ===
The engine used in the car was the 3.0-litre Ford Essex V6. In the 3000ME this all-cast-iron OHV 60° V6 produced 138 bhp (102.9 kW) and 192 lb⋅ft (260.3 N⋅m). It was installed transversely in the car behind the seats.

The transmission was a 5-speed manual that, like the engine, was installed transversely. The transmission was an AC design, using an aluminium case produced by AC and a gear-set from Hewland. The engine drove the transmission via a triplex chain supplied by Renold. The driver selected gears with a Ferrari-like gated gearchange.

=== Other ===
The 3000ME was equipped with electric windows, a sunshine roof panel, Pilkington Sundym laminated glass, an adjustable steering column, and a radio with a powered antenna.

== Technical data ==
AC 3000ME	Detail
Engine:	60° Ford Essex V6
Bore × stroke:	3.69 in (93.7 mm) × 2.85 in (72.4 mm)
Displacement:	2,994 cc (182.7 cu in)
Maximum power:	142 PS (104 kW) at 5000 rpm
Maximum torque:	192 ft⋅lb (260 N⋅m) at 3000 rpm
Compression ratio:	8.9:1
Valvetrain:	Gear-driven cam-in-block, pushrods, rocker arms, two valves per cylinder
Induction:	Single Weber 38/38 EGAS carburettor
Cooling:	Water-cooled
Transmission:	5-speed manual, case by AC, gearset by Hewland
Steering:	Rack and pinion steering, 3.0 turns lock-to-lock
Brakes f/r:	254 mm (10.0 in) discs / 239 mm (9.4 in) discs
Suspension front:	Double wishbone suspension, telescopic dampers
Suspension rear:	Double wishbone suspension, telescopic dampers
Body/chassis:	Fibreglass body on steel perimeter frame
Track f/r:	1,397 / 1,422 mm (55 / 56 in)
Wheelbase:	2,300 mm (90.6 in)
Weight distribution f/r:	40% / 60%
Tyres f/r:	Pirelli 195/60VR-14 (early); Pirelli 205/60VR-14 (late)
Length; Width; Height:	3,988 mm (157 in); 1,651 mm (65 in); 1,143 mm (45 in)
Weight:	1,085 kg (2,392 lb)
Maximum speed:	193 km/h (120 mph)

== Variants ==
=== Ecosse Signature ===
Former racing driver and Ford technical sales specialist John Parsons and Ecosse Technical Director Aubrey Woods purchased the assets of AC (Scotland) with plans to resume production of the 3000ME. By this time the name and intellectual property of the original AC Cars had been bought by Brian Angliss of Autokraft, so Parsons and Woods incorporated their company as the Ecosse Car Company Ltd., and renamed the car the Ecosse Signature. The company was based in Knebworth, Hertfordshire.

The exterior of the Ecosse Signature was restyled by Peter Stevens. Working from the AC (Scotland) Mark II prototype, the Alfa V6 powertrain was removed and a turbocharged Fiat Twin Cam engine and transmission from the Fiat Croma were substituted.

The revised Ecosse Signature was shown at the 1988 Birmingham Motor Show. While it garnered some interest, the company was unable to secure the £350,000 in financing needed to restart production, and the project went no further.

The prototype was rediscovered in an abandoned industrial storage unit in 2017. In unrestored condition it was offered for sale for £8000.

=== AC Ghia ===
In July 1980, Ford of Europe chairman Bob Lutz and vice president Karl Ludvigsen were in Turin at Carrozzeria Ghia checking on some ongoing projects. Ghia's chief designer at the time was Filippo Sapino. Sapino mentioned that Ghia was looking for a mid-engined Ford platform as a base for some future studies, and the Ford-powered 3000ME came up. Ludvigsen, whose responsibilities included overseeing Ford's European motorsports programs, saw this as a possible replacement for the recently retired Mark II Escort rally car. Ludvigsen involved both Ford's directory of rallying Peter Ashcroft and Ford's chief designer Uwe Bahnsen and on 22 September circulated a memo indicating that the revised car would conform to the new 1982 Group B rules.

AC provided Ghia with two cars, one completely assembled and one rolling chassis, on the condition that they would be able to display the car at the 1981 Geneva Motor Show. The complete 3000ME left Thames Ditton on 16 October and arrived in Turin 4 days later, leaving 4 months for the work to be completed.

At 150 in (3,810 mm) long and under 60 in (1,524 mm) wide the resulting car, named the AC Ghia, was both shorter and narrower than the original 3000ME. At 46 in (1,168 mm) high it was one inch taller. The car featured exterior door handles hidden in the edge of the engine intake ducts. Small quarter lights were added. Deep-offset alloy wheels from Speedline mounted 225/50 VR15 Pirelli P6 tyres.

When it appeared at Geneva, it garnered favourable reviews. By this time Ford's rally efforts had moved on to a turbocharged, rear-wheel drive Mk. III Escort, so the AC Ghia was no longer being considered for that role. Still, both Ford and AC were looking for ways to get the car into production. Ford's interest in the car may have been informed by the progress General Motors was making on their nascent P-car project. Internal discussions at Ford over July and August 1981 determined that AC's production capacity was not sufficient for them to supply Ford's North American sportscar project. AC was told that Ghia would sell them the prototype and the tooling for it at a "nominal price". A new engine would have to be found, as Ford was phasing out the Essex V6, although the Ford Cologne V6 in fuel-injected form would be a natural replacement. Ultimately neither Ford nor AC were able to muster sufficient resources to put the car into production. The prototype was auctioned off in 2002.

=== Lincoln Quicksilver ===
In 1983, Ghia released another show car built on the second, rolling 3000ME chassis supplied by AC. This car was called the Lincoln Quicksilver, and instead of being shorter than the 3000ME, the Quicksilver chassis was extended by 280 mm (11.0 in) over that of the original. The extra length allowed the car, which kept the 3000ME's mid-engine layout, to be a full four-door sedan, but one with a roofline that extended rearward over the engine compartment and ended abruptly.

The aerodynamic shape of the car allowed it to record a drag coefficient ($c_\mathrm d$) of just 0.30. Some references report that the original Essex V6 was replaced by a Cologne V6, but was still mated to a 5-speed manual transaxle.

The car remained on the show car circuit until 1986. It appears to have been sold at auction by Ford in 2002 for a price of $45,825 and remained in private collections after that. It was sold again at auction in January 2014.

=== AC-Chrysler 2.2 Turbo ===
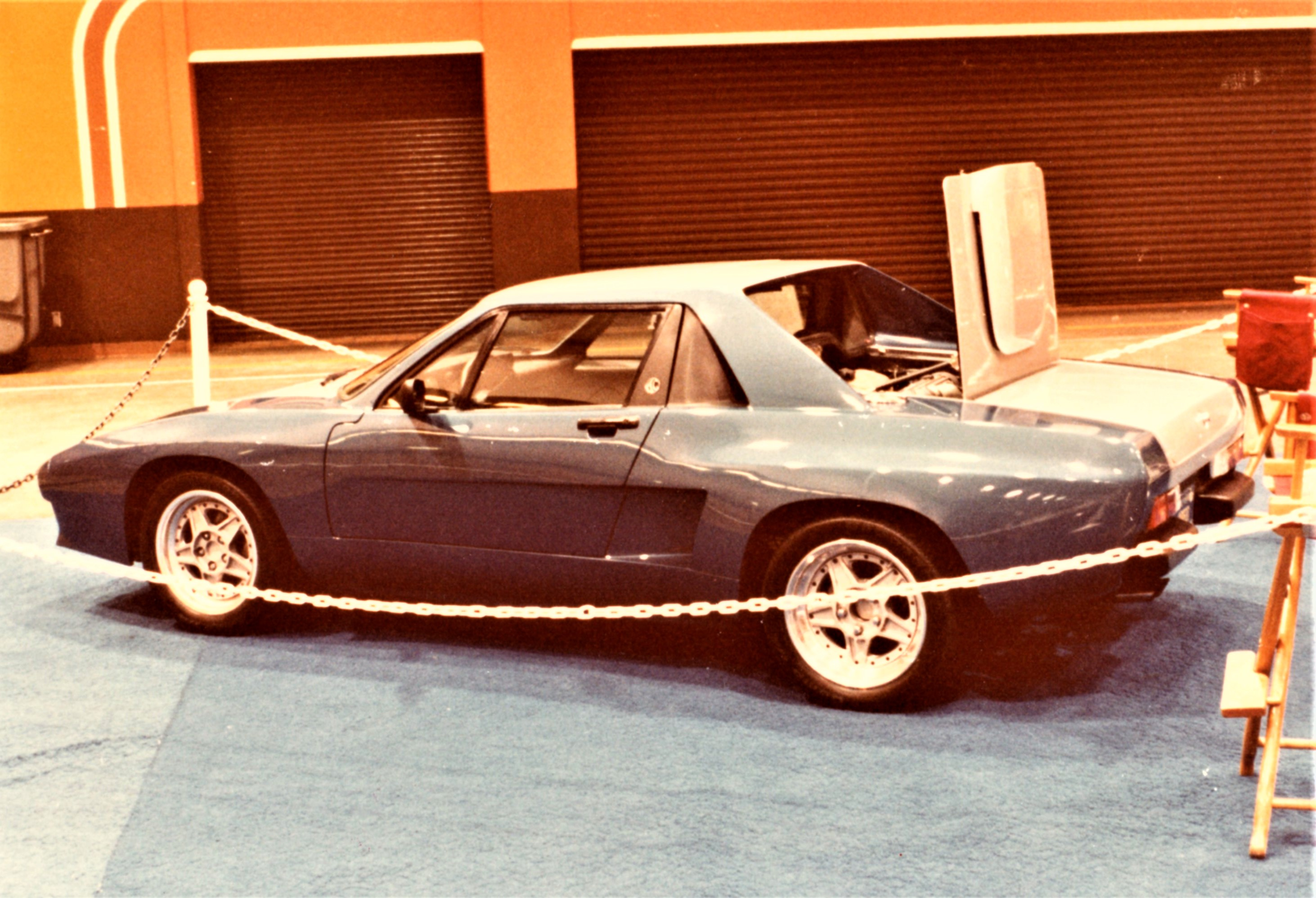
AC-Chrysler 2.2 Turbo

A plan was mooted to sell a modified version of the AC 3000ME in the United States as a Shelby.

In 1980, American partners Steve Hitter and Barry Gale started bringing De Tomaso Panteras into the US from the Belgian distributor though their company, Panteramerica. That same year Gale was in Belgium on a parts buying trip when Claude DuBois, the Pantera distributor who was also the AC distributor, gave him a ride in an AC 3000ME. Gale flew to England and negotiated an agreement for the US rights to the car with Derek Hurlock and ordered one car, less engine and transaxle. This car, chassis #161, arrived in the States in February 1981. After a failed overture to Chevrolet for a supply of the V6 and transaxle from the new Chevrolet Citation, the car was sent to the US workshops of Arkay Incorporated in Hawthorne California. Arkay was run by Kas Kastner, the Triumph Motor Company's former Competition Director for North America. Arkay did general automotive development work, and specialized in turbocharger conversions.

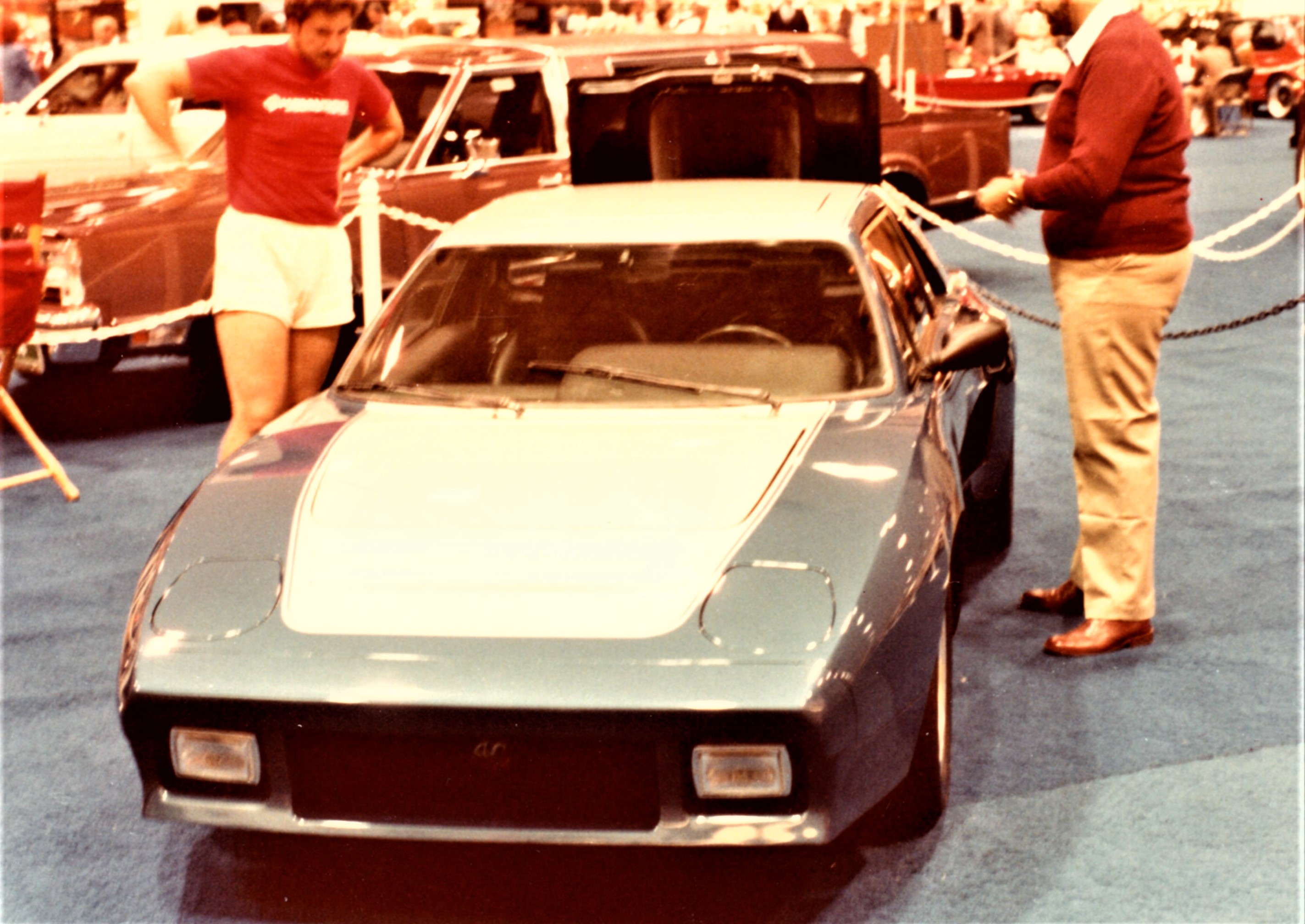
AC-Chrysler 2.2 Turbo

Arkay did a full assessment of the Chevrolet V6 and discovered that the AC would need a new subframe to fit it. Ford offered a 1.6 L inline-four powertrain, but this was rejected as underpowered. Eventually a Buick V6 was installed, but after Arkay adapted the Buick engine to the Chevrolet transaxle, Buick pulled out of the project. While Panteramerica was looking for a suitable engine, the car was restyled by Bob Marianich.

At this point the car was seen by Ray Geddes. Geddes had sold his Pantera parts company to Hitter and Gale, who had renamed it Panteramerica. Geddes was now working for Carroll Shelby, and when he saw the car in Kastner's shop he got Shelby involved. At this time Shelby was working with Chrysler, for whom Kastner had already done a turbocharger kit for their 2.2 L engine that was available through Chrysler's Direct Connection performance arm. Shelby met the partners at the SEMA show in Las Vegas and agreed to take on the project. Work continued at Arkay until Shelby's new Chrysler-Shelby High Performance Center in Santa Fe Springs on the eastern edge of Los Angeles was complete, after which the car was transferred there.

Under the direction of project administrator and chief mechanic Steve Hope, development engineer Neil Hanneman and engineer Scott Harvey, first a naturally-aspirated 2.2 L Chrysler engine was installed, replaced later by a turbocharged G-24 engine and 5-speed transaxle. The car was renamed the Shelby ME 2.2 Turbo. The prototype went to Metalcrafters to have bodywork and paint completed, after which it was presented to Chrysler president Lee Iacocca. The company decided not to put the car into production, so the prototype became a test mule for Shelby until the Los Angeles facility was closed, after which Hitter and Gale picked the car up and put it into storage. The prototype survives.

== Motorsports ==
Chassis 119 was progressively converted into a "Lightweight" special suitable for use in hill climbs and sprints. Much of the conversion work, which included first a single- then twin-turbo engine upgrades, was done by Robin Rew. The car was later returned to a road-legal state, but kept many of the performance upgrades. This car appeared on the cover of the September 1986 edition of Sports Car Monthly magazine.

Chassis 156 was imported to Australia, where it was converted for rally use. Extensive work was done to prepare the car for racing, including adding an F.I.A.-compliant roll cage, and complete overhauls of both the suspension and engine. Consideration was also given to using the car on the Historic racing circuit.

A special tube-frame car with a heavily modified 3000ME body was built for the Supersports series. This car is powered by a Cosworth BDA engine driving through a Hewland transaxle. It was featured in the February 1992 issue of Cars and Car Conversions magazine.
