= Petra Noskaiová =

Slovak classical mezzo-soprano

- Education: Conservatory of Bratislava
- Occupation: Classical mezzo-soprano
- Organizations: Huelgas Ensemble; Quasars Ensemble

Petra Noskaiová is a Slovak classical mezzo-soprano, active in the field of Baroque music.

== Career ==
Noskaiová studied music at the conservatory of Bratislava from 1988 to 1994 and voice with Ružena Illenbergerová. She continued studies with Marius van Altena, Harry van der Kamp and Sigiswald Kuijken.

Noskaiová has worked with several ensembles in the field of historically informed performance, especially regularly with Kuijken's La Petite Bande. She has recorded with them Bach cantatas for a complete liturgical year, including the early Weinen, Klagen, Sorgen, Zagen, BWV 12, written in Weimar in 1714, recorded in 2009 together with Gerlinde Sämann, Christoph Genz and Jan van der Crabben. She appeared in a concert of Bach cantatas at the Rheingau Musik Festival in the Eibingen Abbey in 2005. She recorded with La Petite Bande also Bach's St Matthew Passion and Mass in B minor, with Genz as the Evangelist and van der Crabben as the Vox Christi, the voice of Jesus. The ensemble, with the soloists singing also the choral parts, performed the work for the opening of the Thüringer Bachwochen 2009 in the Bach-Kirche of Arnstadt, where Bach had worked as a young man.

She has collaborated with the Huelgas Ensemble in recordings such as Alfonso Ferrabosco's Psalm 103, motets and madrigals.

Noskaiová has been a member of the Slovak chamber ensemble Quasars Ensemble, founded in 2008.

She has regularly collaborated with the Slovak Radio and produced recordings for Slovart, Dynamic, and Matou. She has appeared at international festivals such as the Days of Early Music in Bratislava, the Festival of Ambronay, and the Festival Oude Muziek in Utrecht. In Utrecht she appeared in the opera L'Orfeo of Antonio Sartorio, with Ellen Hargis as Orfeo and Suzie LeBlanc as Euridice. The performance was recorded live. With the Christ Church Cathedral Choir in Montreal she performed in José de Nebra's Stabat Mater dolorosa.
