= Emmanuelle Khanh =

French fashion designer (1937–2017)

- Born: Renée Georgette Jeanne Mézière; September 12, 1937; Paris, France
- Died: February 17, 2017 (aged 79); Paris, France
- Occupation(s): Fashion designer, stylist and model
- Spouse: Quasar Khanh

Emmanuelle Khanh (12 September 1937 – 17 February 2017) was a French fashion designer, stylist and model. She was particularly known for her distinctive outsize eyewear, and was considered one of the leading young designers of the 1960s New Wave movement in France.

== Early life ==
She was born Renée Georgette Jeanne Mézière in Paris on 12 September 1937, and nicknamed Nono. Her father René worked for the French Resistance newspaper Combat. Her mother, Ernestine, died when Renée was 10 years old.

In 1957 she married the engineer, inventor and designer Nguyen Manh Khanh, known for his inflatable furniture and a square transparent car called the Quasar-Unipower or The Cube.

== Fashion career ==
=== Modelling ===
Renée decided to become a fashion model after graduating from business school, and subsequently became a fitting model for Cristóbal Balenciaga. At this point she assumed the professional name Emmanuelle. She also modelled for Hubert de Givenchy. After four years, she quit modelling in order to pursue a career in fashion design. The hairdresser Vidal Sassoon described the 5 foot 6 Khanh as "the epitome of why men loved French girls," with her "slim and exotic" looks.

=== Fashion design ===
White dress designed by Emmanuelle Khanh

In 1962, Khanh and Christiane Bailly launched their first collection under the label Emma Christie, which was retailed through popular Paris boutiques. Khanh rapidly became a leading name in Paris young fashion, and was compared to Mary Quant. Like Quant and the London Mod movement, Khanh was seen as a leading name in the French New Wave movement.

In 1963, she was described as knowing exactly what young women wanted, selling her clothing in both Britain and the United States. By 1964, her business fetched $4 million a year, and she was credited with having brought "class and status" to the French ready-made clothing industry.

In 1964, she signed an exclusive contract with the New York City department store Henri Bendel, and also sold clothing through Macy's "Little Shop" boutiques. Around this time, she launched the London-based hairstylist Vidal Sassoon in Paris by asking him to do the hair for a fashion show in the early 1960s. The models, who wore snugly fitting James Wedge hats, pulled off the hats at the end of the show to demonstrate how Sassoon's signature architectural cuts simply fell back into place, which astonished the French press and established Sassoon as a challenge to world-renowned French hairdressing. She also gave a publicity boost to the Italian fashion house Missoni in 1965, when she and Ottavio Missoni collaborated on a knitwear collection.

In addition to Missoni, Khanh also designed collections for similarly youth-oriented labels Krizia and Cacharel. The fashion historian and curator Valerie Steele has described Khanh as part of the 1960s fashion revolution, in which female designers from around the world brought street influences and young, easy-to-wear clothing in as a challenge to the then male-dominated formal world of haute couture. Khanh said she wanted to design clothes that anyone on the street could wear.

A contemporary press piece in 1968 ranked Khanh and Bailly alongside Michèle Rosier as part of a "new race" of young designers, described as "stylists who work for ready-to-wear." These French ready-to-wear designers were called créateurs.

In 1971, Khanh and the London-based Ossie Clark were the first members of a new fashion group, Créateurs et Industriels, founded by the manufacturer Didier Grumbach as a means of bringing together innovative ready-to-wear designers from around the world (including Issey Miyake and Thierry Mugler) with manufacturers prepared to promote their originality. The group was eventually absorbed by the Chambre Syndicale de la Haute Couture who realised that such original and creative ready-to-wear was more profitable and widely marketable than haute couture, and created its own equivalent group, also supervised by Grumbach, the Fédération Française de la Couture, du Prêt-à-Porter des Couturiers et des Créateurs de Mode.

She founded her own company in 1971, Emmanuelle Khanh Paris, opened the first boutiques in her own name in 1977, and formed Emmanuelle Khanh International in 1987. The company closed in the late 1990s, and the Khanh brand was sold in 2007 to a Dutch conglomerate.

== Later life and death ==
Emmanuelle Khanh died at her Paris home of pancreatic cancer on 17 February 2017, aged 79.
