= Quazar (disambiguation) =

A quasar is an extremely luminous active galactic nucleus.

Quazar may also refer to:

- Quazar (wrestler), former ring name of professional wrestler César Curiel (born 1949)
- Quazar (board game), a 1977 board wargame
- Quazar (band), U.S. band founded by Glenn Goins
- Quazar (album), the debut album from 1978 by the band Quazar founded by Glenn Goins
- Captain Quazar (character), a fictional character from the eponymous 1996 videogame Captain Quazar

== See also ==
- Kwazar (Russian: КВАЗАР), a chipmaker; see List of x86 manufacturers
- Quazer (sewing machine), a sewing machine from Sarine (company)
- Quazer (videogame), a 1990 video game from The Fourth Dimension (company)
- Qwaser (character class), a character type from the anime-manga cartoon-comic The Qwaser of Stigmata media franchise
- Quasar (disambiguation)
