= Sabre Sprint =

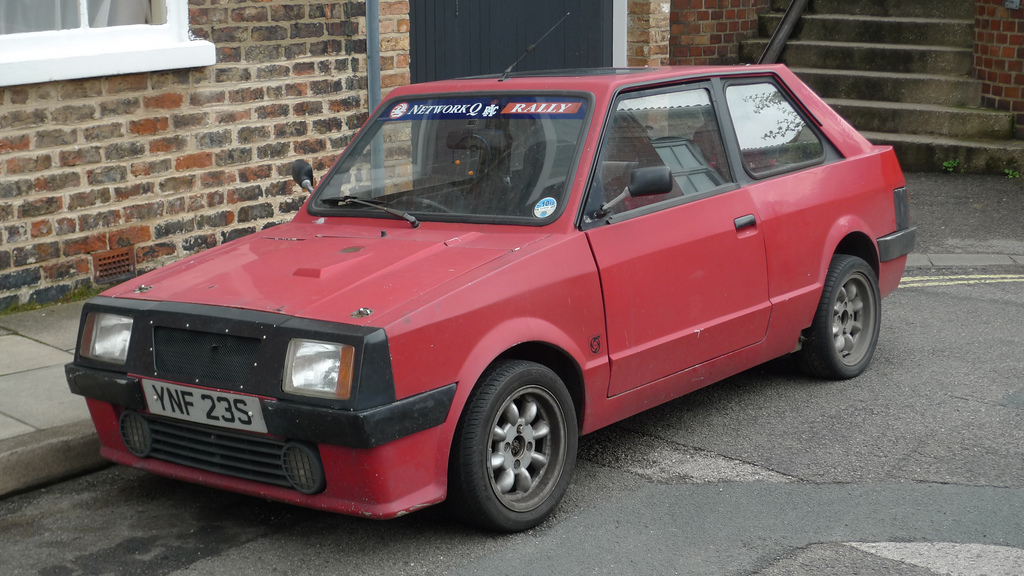
- MK1 Sabre Sprint

Overview
- Manufacturer: Sabre Cars
- Production: 1984–1986

Body and chassis
- Class: mini car

The Sabre Sprint was a kit car based on the Mini, produced in the United Kingdom by Sabre Cars between 1984 and 1986.

== Sabre Cars ==
Steven Crabtree founded Sabre Cars in Wallsend, Newcastle upon Tyne in 1984, after years of producing fibreglass products such as canoes, boats, sunbeds and fibreglass panels for other kit car brands. Crabtree designed and engineered the Sabre Sprint.

== Manufacture and design ==
The Sabre Sprint was created from an all fibreglass monocoque body reinforced with kevlar and carbon fibre at the mountings for extra strength. It used a classic Mini front subframe and A-series engine at the front. The rear was a galvanised beam axle used with classic Mini radius arms and coilover suspension. The car had four seats and a boot area which could be accessed by tilting the rear seats. Its boxy features resembled that of the Ford Escort MK3 or a Talbot Sunbeam. Some of them made it into motorsport, rallying, hill climbing and such due to the lightweight but strong design.

== Variants ==
=== MK1 ===
The first design of the Sabre Sprint featured square headlights and an opening glass rear hatch.

=== MK2 ===
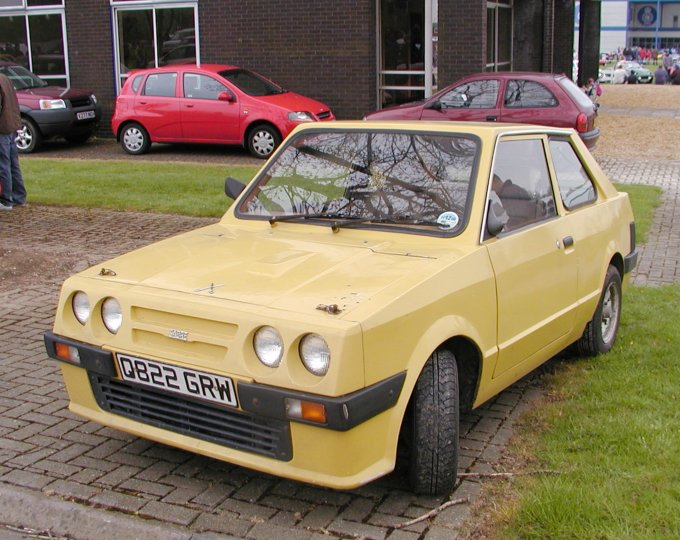
MK2 Sabre Sprint

Introduced only a year after the MK1. The front was changed to twin round headlights and a redesigned rear featured a full opening hatch.

=== Hybrid ===
Hybrids of the MK1 and MK2 were created during the change over period at Sabre Cars. These cars feature the twin round headlight front but with the MK1 style opening glass hatch.

=== Vario ===
While the hybrid version was redesigned in 1985 an additional version was conceived. It had a removable fibreglass rear roof section, and closely resembled a convertible with the A and B pillars remaining in place. The boot had a removable lid which could be replaced with a hatchback estate roof. Despite seemingly like a good idea at the time, few Varios were sold.

=== Camper ===
Just one Sabre Camper was produced.

== End of manufacture ==
The Sabre Sprint vanished in 1986. The Sabre moulds ended up the property of a nearby company. The company later produced the FRA Mini based on the monocoque floor pan of the Sabre moulds. The FRA Minis have the same shortened floorpan as the sabre sprint.

== See also ==
- List of Mini-based cars
