= QSR =

QSR may refer to:

- QSR International, a qualitative research software developer based in Melbourne, Australia
- QSR, a standardized Q code initially developed for commercial radiotelegraph communication
- Quick service restaurant (also fast-food restaurant), a specific type of restaurant that serves fast food cuisine and has minimal table service
- Restaurant Brands International (stock symbol: QSR), a Canadian multinational fast food holding company
- Salerno Costa d'Amalfi Airport (IATA code: QSR), an airport in southern Italy, near to Salerno
