= Stimson Safari Six =

Overview
- Production: 1972–73
- Designer: Barry Stimson

Body and chassis
- Layout: Front-engine, front-wheel drive

The Stimson Safari Six is a Mini-based six-wheeled pickup motor vehicle designed by Barry Stimson. It was introduced into the UK market in 1972, when it was offered for sale by Design Developments at £800 (equivalent to £13,300 in 2023 (Note: UK Retail Price Index inflation figures are based on data from Clark, Gregory (2017), "The Annual RPI and Average Earnings for Britain, 1209 to Present (New Series)", MeasuringWorth)). That price included a hood covering the entire vehicle from the rear to the windscreen, with a zip-up sidescreen that served as the driver's door. The car was also available in kit form from £270, depending on its level of completion.

The Safari Six was in production for about a year before Design Developments went into receivership in 1974, having by then produced about 20 cars.

== Construction ==
The vehicle's glassfibre body is mounted on a steel tubular-frame chassis. It has a fold-down rear bench seat and a lockable underfloor boot.

== Engine and transmission ==
The front-wheel drive Safari Six is powered by an 848 cc (51.7 cu in) Austin Mini engine and gearbox mounted on a Mini sub frame.

== Later developments ==
The rights to the Safari Six were acquired by Automotive Services, who planned to convert the vehicle to use a Ford Fiesta or Peugeot engine and relaunch it as the Shikara, but that never materialised.
