= Gitane GT =

George Fowell Plant Ltd, an established manufacturer of construction and industrial machinery in Wolverhampton, built a mid-engined sports car in 1962. The Gitane featured a rear-mounted 997c.c. Mini engine, Weber carburettor, multi-tubular frame, and disk brakes. A top speed of 130 mph (210 km/h) was claimed. Unfortunately, the Gitane was too highly priced, and production ended after a few cars were built.
