= Bulant (automobile) =

Motor vehicle

The Bulanti was an Australian automobile built in 1971 by Brian Rawlings at Annangrove, New South Wales, Australia. The Bulanti was based on the Mini Cooper, and was a mid-engined fibreglass coupé. It was built on a fabricated steel frame, on which the Mini sub-frame was laid, and weighed 1177 lb (535 kg).

The Bulant factory was located next to the Amaroo Park motor racing circuit, which was used as the test track for the prototype Bulanti, which had an aluminium body.

Rawlings built and sold two additional fibreglass bodied cars, but when prospective customers wanted their cars built to their exact specifications, Rawlings decided that he couldn't spare the time on future construction, and ended the project. The aluminium prototype survives today.
