= Quasar Khanh =

Vietnamese engineer (1934–2016)

Nguyen Manh Khanh (1934 in Hanoi – June 30, 2016 in Ho Chi Minh City), also known as Quasar Khanh, was a French and Vietnamese engineer, an inventor, and a designer. The Vietnamese and French community significantly recognizes him for his inflatable furniture line Aerospace. At the age of fifteen, Khanh moved to Paris, and established himself as the most significant Vietnamese furniture designer of the 20th century. He was one of a handful of designers whose shocking products, in color and in form, were in touch with the renegade spirit of the 1960s.

== Biography ==
During Khanh’s early adulthood he studied engineering at the National School of Bridges and Roads (1955-1958) in Paris. There, he met the beautiful and talented French fashion designer Emmanuelle. They married in 1957 and later had their daughter Atlantic Khanh. In this same year Nguyen Manh Khanh began going by the name Quasar Khanh, before he started his career in design. Before his death he moved back to Vietnam, Ho Chi Minh City.

== Works ==
Right out of school Khanh practiced engineering with Estrees Viduct. Before Khanh designed his first solo product of an inner city car, he worked in Quebec on the Manicouagan dam over the course of two years (1958-1960).

In 1964, Khanh invented a car called the Quasar-Unipower or the Cube. This was manufactured for two years by the British firm Unipower in 1967-1969. A year before The Cube went into manufacturing Khanh started designing his first and only 11-piece inflatable furniture collection, Aerospace. Aerospace went into manufacturing in 1969 at Khanh’s very own manufacturing company. Today, the company Fugu Furniture, located in Puteaux, France, now produces the Aerospace line.

Over the years, Khanh added a line of sand molded aluminum cast furniture, and produced the Khanh Hydrair KX1 and QuasArk Q2 boat prototypes and a bamboo bicycle called bambooclette.

He continued to design a variety of problem solving solutions late into his life before his death in Ho Chi Minh City on June 30, 2016.
