= Quasars Ensemble =

Slovakian musical ensemble

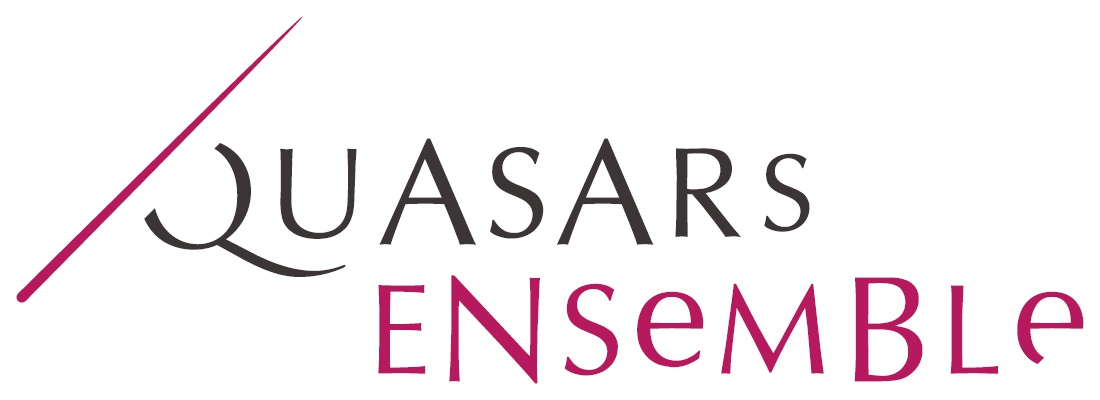
- Quasars Ensemble logo

Background information
- Origin: Slovakia
- Genres: Classical music, contemporary music
- Years active: 2008––present
- Members: Ivan Buffa (artistic director); Andrea Mosorjaková (flute); Mónika Csonka (oboe); Martin Mosorjak (clarinet); Attila Janko (bassoon); Hunor Varga (horn); Istvan Siket (trumpet); Diana Buffa (piano); Tamás Schlanger (percussion); Bojidara Kouzmanova-Vladar (violin); Peter Mosorjak (violin); Axel Kircher (viola); Ján Bogdan (cello); Marián Bujňák (double bass)
- Website: quasars-ensemble.com

Quasars Ensemble, founded in 2008 in Slovakia is a professional musical ensemble focusing on classical and contemporary music.

== Career ==
It is a guest at festivals in Slovakia (Bratislava Music Festival, Melos-Ethos, Viva Musica!) and abroad festivals such as Música Viva in Lisbon (Portugal), Arcus Temporum in Pannonhalma (Hungary), Warsaw Autumn Festival (Poland), Ostrava Days Festival (Czech Republic), etc.

It has performed at Flagey in Brussels, Chamber Hall of NOSPR in Katowice, Budapest Music Center in Budapest and Gasteig in Munich.

Quasars Ensemble was selected to take part in Darmstädter Ferienkurse in Germany and it has been the resident ensemble of the Kasárne/Kulturpark Cultural Center in Košice. Its concert cycle was an element in the European Capital of Culture 2013 and ISCM World Music Days 2013 projects in the city.

The Slovak Philharmonic Orchestra hosted Quasars as its soloist performing Ivan Buffa's "Organismi".

== Repertoire ==
The repertoire consists of contemporary classical music as well as of the music of the past eras. It confronts the latest contemporary works with the structural principles of the foregone classical music. The orchestra's focus is on the introduction of rare and forgotten ensemble pieces, particularly by the Slovak authors.

The ensemble performed concert works of some of contemporary music composers such as Bent Sørensen, Michael Jarrell, Kaija Saariaho and Toshio Hosokawa with composers themselves in attendance.

Quasars Ensemble collaborated with artists like Camilla Hoitenga, Mario Caroli, Dalibor Karvay, Lionel Peintre, Sergej Kopčák, and Stephan Loges.

== Members ==
Ivan Buffa is the artistic director of Quasars Ensemble, the Head of the Association of Slovak Composers and a member of various festival committees. He also teaches composition at The Academy of Performing Arts in Bratislava.

== Discography ==
Quasars Ensemble has a recording contract with Hevhetia Recording Company. Their album containing pieces by Arnold Schoenberg, Alexander Albrecht and Paul Hindemith, who are considered the founding fathers of the chamber symphony, was awarded with the artistic award of the Crystal Wing Awards. Harmonie, a Czech music magazine, gave their recording of the works of Gustav Mahler, Claude Debussy, Albrecht and Francis Poulenc its "Editor's Choice" award and a six-star rating.

- Ivan Parík – Solo Sonatas, Music Fund, (2016)
- Néo-classicisme, Hevhetia, (2015)
- Schönberg, Albrecht, Hindemith, Hevhetia, (2013)
- Sergej Kopčák – Last Words, Music Centre, (2012)
- Cantico delle Creature, Music Fund, (2011)
- Debussy, Mahler, Albrecht, Poulenc, Hevhetia, (2011)
- Contemporary Reflections, Hevhetia, (2011)
- Vladimír Bokes – Chamber Music, Music Fund, (2009)
- New Slovak Music For Piano, Hevhetia, (2006)
