= Quasar-Unipower =

Overview
- Manufacturer: Universal Power Drives Ltd (England)
- Production: 1967–1968

Body and chassis
- Class: Special Production

Powertrain
- Engine: 1.1 L Inline four-cylinder

Dimensions
- Length: 64 inches (1624 mm)
- Width: 66 inches (1675 mm)
- Height: 74 inches (1878 mm)

The Quasar-Unipower was a box-like car produced in limited numbers between 1967 and 1968 by Universal Power Drives of Perivale, Middlesex, England, who also built the Unipower GT sports car.

Designed by Quasar Khanh, a French-Vietnamese designer and engineer, the car used plastic inflatable seats, a glass roof and sliding glass doors, in a cube-like configuration that was wider than it was long. The Unipower employed a four-cylinder 1100 cc BMC engine with an automatic transmission. Modified Mini subframes carried the suspension components and Mini 10 inch wheels were used. The car had a top speed of 50 mph (80 km/h).

== See also ==
- List of car manufacturers of the United Kingdom
