= Unipower GT =

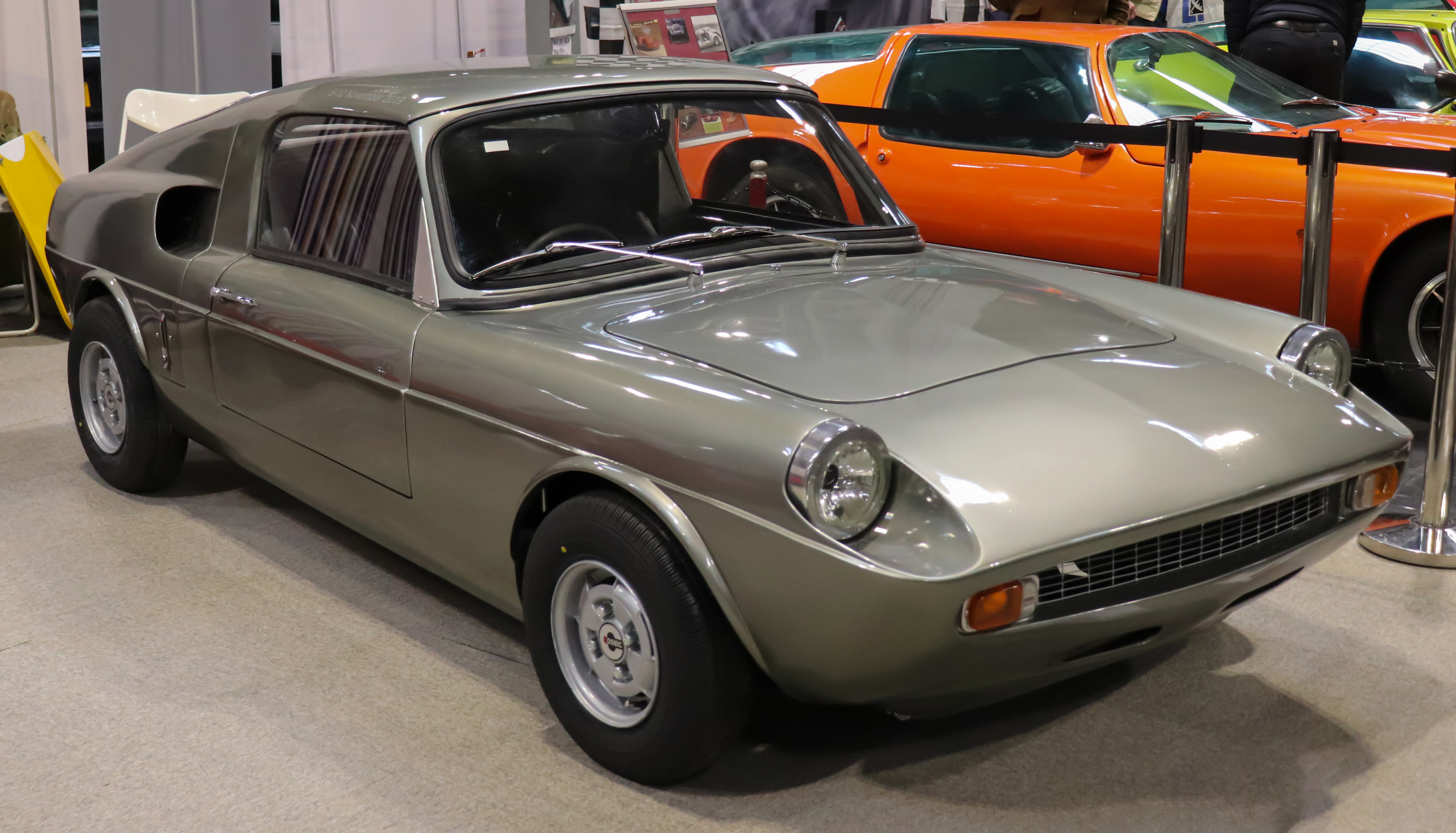

Overview
- Manufacturer: Universal Power Drives Ltd.; U.W.F. Automative Engineering Ltd.
- Production: 1966–1969
- Assembly: England: Perivale, Middlesex; England: Park Royal, West London
- Designer: Ernie Unger; Valerian Dare-Bryan; Ron Bradshaw

Body and chassis
- Class: Sports car (S)
- Body style: 2-door coupé
- Layout: Mid/rear
- Related: ESAP Minimach GT

Powertrain
- Engine: 998 cc (60.9 cu in) I4; 1,275 cc (77.8 cu in) I4
- Transmission: 4 speed manual

Dimensions
- Wheelbase: 84 in (2,134 mm)
- Length: 139 in (3,531 mm)
- Width: 57.5 in (1,460 mm)
- Height: 40.5 in (1,029 mm)
- Kerb weight: 10 long cwt (1,120.0 lb; 508.0 kg)

The Unipower GT is a British specialist sports car that debuted at the January 1966 Racing Car Show. It uses the powertrain from the BMC Mini mounted amidships. Production lasted until the end of 1969.

== History ==
=== Early development ===
Ernie Unger worked at Lotus in 1954 and 1955 as a mechanic and racing car preparer, then entered the student-apprenticeship program with the Rootes Group, eventually becoming a development engineer on the Hillman Imp.

Inspired by the sophisticated engineering and body development of the Italian Abarths, Unger produced sketches for a car meant to combine these qualities with the excellent vehicle dynamics of the best contemporary British sportscars. During the car's gestation, Unger moved from Rootes to Ford, where he was involved in development of the Ford Cortina.

At Goodwood in 1963 Unger and Valerian Dare-Bryan talked about their shared views on car design. Dare-Bryan was a free-lance automotive designer who had previously worked at Lotus alongside Colin Chapman, and with aerodynamicist Frank Costin. In 1964 and 1965 Dare-Bryan designed the Attila series of racing sports cars for Racing Developments of North London. By the late 1960s he was running Roy Pierpoint's Ford Falcon team. Dare-Bryan partnered with Unger to handle mechanical development of Unger's concept.

The shape of the car was drawn by a moonlighting member of Ford's design staff. Ron Bradshaw was working on the design of Ford's new GT40 when he was approached by Unger and Dare-Bryan about their project, and agreed to draw the new car as well.

Bradshaw's final drawings and a prototype chassis with a wire-frame skeleton built in Pierpoint's shop were delivered to coachbuilder Robert Peel and Company, Kingston upon Thames, who fabricated an aluminium body over the supplied structure using the drawings as a guide.

The car was shown to Mini designer Alec Issigonis. The famous engineer was so impressed that he arranged for Unipower to obtain parts from BMC at a price far lower than the replacement retail they would have otherwise had to pay, which helped keep the price of the car low.

=== UPD ===
Tim Powell was the owner of Universal Power Drives Ltd (UPD) in Perivale, Middlesex. UPD built specialised multi-axle trucks that were sold under the Unipower brand. Powell was a racing enthusiast who later became involved in powerboat racing and was eventually made Commodore and President of United Kingdom Offshore Boating Association. Powell acquired the car project, providing financial backing and production facilities. Andrew Hedges, UPD's sales manager and former BMC works driver, was to handle sales of the new car.

Production bodies were made by Specialised Mouldings Limited of Huntingdon, who lifted a mould from the aluminium-bodied buck made by Peel Brothers. Early bodies had a Coefficient of drag $\scriptstyle C_\mathrm d\,$ of 0.37. Production chassis were built by Arch Motors, who also fabricated some of the suspension components.

The Unipower GT debuted at the London Racing Car Show in January 1966. UPD had planned to call the car the "Hustler GT", but the Hustler name was used for another UPD product. The car remained unnamed until just prior to the show, when Ian Smith, organizer of the 1966 Racing Car Show, suggested Unipower GT so that he would have something to put in the show catalogue.

Initial pricing for the 998 cc Mini Cooper engine version was £950, while the 1275 cc Cooper S version was priced at £1150. Although promotional literature for the car did include pricing for it in component form, the GT was never intended to be sold as a kit car, and very few left the factory as anything other than complete cars. The few exceptions included cars for owners who planned to install customised powertrains.

In a reference to the transverse mid-engined Lamborghini supercar that debuted one year earlier, the GT was dubbed the "Mini Miura" in the pages of Sport Auto magazine by racing driver and journalist José Rosinski.

The GT appeared at the Racing Car Show again the next year, where it was photographed on its stand with model Monika Dietrich and racing driver Stirling Moss.

After encountering some early problems with aerodynamic lift, the bodyshape was tested in the MIRA wind tunnel. A front spoiler was subsequently added to reduce lift. As a result of the MIRA test and changes, the coefficient of drag on later cars was reduced to 0.32.

=== UWF ===
By 1968 Powell and UPD had lost interest in the car. A planned targa version was cancelled. Unger partnered with Piers Weld-Forester, the grandson of the Marquis of Ormande and a Royal Courtier. These two formed a new company called U.W.F. Automative Engineering (UWF), that also traded under the name "Unipower Cars". UWF bought the car and assembly line from UPD and restarted production in Park Royal, West London.

The UWF cars had some minor changes from the ones built by UPD, including softer springs, new alloy wheels, a revised dashboard and new taillamps. Some refer to the cars built by UWF as "MkII" cars, and the ones built by UPD as "MkI".

Other references use the MkII designation for a planned successor to the GT that would retain the mid-engine layout but be larger than the original car. Early design work was done by Peter Bohanna. When this project stalled, Bohanna partnered with Robin Stables to form Bohanna Stables and produced a mid-engined prototype called the Diablo that debuted at the 1972 London Racing Car Show and was later developed into the AC 3000ME. The "Mk2" moniker has also been used to refer to a much later design done by Dare-Bryan for a successor to the GT, this one powered by a mid-mounted Toyota powertrain, that never reached fruition.

UWF stopped production of the Unipower GT in late 1969, and the last car was delivered in early 1970.

Total production is estimated to have been at most 75 cars. One reference reports that 73 cars were built, with UPD responsible for 42 units, and UWF for 31. Around 30% of production of the GTs were built in a left-hand drive configuration.

The process of liquidating UWF began in December 1969. The company was completely wrapped up by March 1975.

In late 2016, four Unipower GT's, the first production Unipower GT built, the first Competition version built, a Left Hand Drive version and the last of the UPD cars produced and undergoing a major restoration, with their respective owners, Tim Carpenter, Gerry Hulford, Mark Glaisher and Thomas Jay, gathered at the Supercar Classics event at Beaulieu, England, organised by the Unipower GT Owners Club & Register, in celebration of the 50th anniversary of the car's launch.

== Related ==
=== Quasar Unipower ===
The Quasar Unipower city car is related to the GT only in so far as it is built by the same parent company, and is powered by an engine from the same family.

The Quasar was designed by Franco-Vietnamese designer N'Guyen Manh Khanh. The car's body was shaped like that of a rectangular prism, with the four side faces and the top made of glass. The car was 64 in (1,626 mm) long, 66 in (1,676 mm) wide, and 74 in (1,880 mm) high. Its turning radius was just 18 ft (5.5 m). Access to the interior was gained via one of six sliding glass doors, and the car could accommodate up to six people on clear inflatable seats. The 1098 cc BMC drivetrain was mounted under the rear seats. There was no provision for heating or cooling the interior.

Fifteen are estimated to have been built.

=== ESAP Minimach GT ===
Gianfranco Padoan was an amateur racing driver and owner of an Italian automobile tuning and accessories company called ESAP, an acronym for Equipaggiamenti Sportivi Auto Preparazione. In 1967 Padoan, who started racing Minis in 1964, ordered a left-hand drive Unipower GT and picked it up at the factory. Back home in Italy, he was unable to have the car certified for road use by the Ispettorato Generale della Motorizzazione due to non-compliance with Italian requirements for the size and height of the headlamps.

Padoan modified the car's body, creating a new forward-tiling one-piece nose that had larger and higher rectangular headlamps. The original taillamps were replaced with units from the Fiat 850. Other changes were made to the body sides, wheel arches and rear, and the doors were mounted with exterior hinges. Inside, the gear shift lever was moved from the sill to the centre of the cabin between the driver and passenger. Arrangements were made to obtain new A-Series engines from the Innocenti Mini. By the time he was finished, Padoan considered the result a new car, which he called the ESAP Minimach GT, and sought financing to put it into production. One investor was Achille Vianello. Another was Lino Coin of the Coin supermarket chain.

The car, priced at ₤1,735,000, was presented to the Italian press in February 1968 and appeared at the Geneva Motor Show in March. That same year Padoan raced the car at the 1000 Kilometres of Monza in April and the Targa Florio in May.

When UPD found out about the car, they sued. Padoan was also unable to get the revised car certified for road use, and eventually the project foundered. ESAP was sold to new owners and renamed Speedline. Padoan left the automotive field and turned to boat building.

One Minimach GT is said to survive.

=== Banshee ===
The Banshee is a one-off mid-engined roadster that was built in South Africa. Its owner and builder is Tertius Van Zyl.

Van Zyl was inspired to build the Banshee by an article on the Unipower GT in an issue of Cars and Car Conversions magazine. The powertrain came from the builder's own 850 cc Mini. Construction took place over approximately 15 years, during which time the racing class the car was intended to compete in was ended.

== Technical ==
The Unipower GT made extensive use of mechanical components from the BMC Mini.

The engine was the BMC A-Series engine, with a cast iron block and head. As in the Mini, this four-cylinder overhead valve engine was mounted transversely and had its gearbox unit in the engine's sump, sharing lubricating oil with the engine. In the Unipower GT the powertrain was mounted behind the driver and passenger and just ahead of the rear axle in a rear mid-engine, rear-wheel-drive layout. Two versions of the engine were available; a 998 cc (60.9 cu in) engine from the Mini-Cooper and a more potent 1,275 cc (77.8 cu in) Cooper "S" engine. Both versions received their air/fuel mixture through a pair of SU HS2 carburettors. The relocation of the engine to the middle of the car resulted in the shift gate being located on the right-hand sill in the right-hand drive cars.

The spaceframe chassis was fabricated of square and rectangular cross-section steel tubing and included integrated roll-over protection. The main portions of the fibreglass body were bonded directly to the chassis, increasing stiffness.

Suspension was independent all around, with wishbones and coil-over dampers in front and lateral links and trailing arms with coil-over dampers in the rear.

Other components were sourced from the parts bins of a variety of major manufacturers. The front uprights were from the Mini, with the spindles cut off. The steering rack was also a Mini part, but from the left-hand drive model. The front indicator lamps were from BMC's Austin 1100 model. The windscreen and instrument panel cover were from Triumph's Spitfire product line. The door hinges and locks came from the Ford Cortina. The headlamp assemblies came from the Jensen C-V8. Taillamps were sourced from the Vauxhall Viva HA. The interior of the car was trimmed out by coachbuilders Wood & Pickett.

== Technical summary ==
	Unipower GT	
Engine:	BMC A-series engine	
Displacement:	998 cc (60.9 cu in)	1,275 cc (77.8 cu in)
Bore × Stroke:	64.58 mm × 76.2 mm (2.5 in × 3.0 in)	70.6 mm × 81.28 mm (2.8 in × 3.2 in)
Maximum power:	55 hp (41.0 kW) at 5800 rpm	75 hp (55.9 kW) at 6000 rpm
Maximum torque:	57 ft⋅lb (77.3 N⋅m) at 3000 rpm	79 ft⋅lb (107.1 N⋅m) at 3000 rpm
Compression ratio:	9.0:1	9.8:1
Valvetrain:	Single cam-in-block, pushrods, rocker arms, 2 overhead valves per cylinder	
Induction:	2 SU HS2 carburettors, naturally aspirated	
Cooling:	Water cooled	
Transmission:	4-speed manual (Jack Knight 5-speed optional), rear-wheel drive	
Clutch:	7.25 in (184 mm) single dry plate, hydraulic actuation	
Brakes front/rear:	7 in (178 mm) discs / 7 in × 1.25 in (178 mm × 32 mm) drums	
Front suspension:	Upper and lower A-arms, coil-over dampers	
Rear suspension:	Lateral links and trailing arms, coil-over dampers	
Body/chassis:	Space frame of square-section steel tube with bonded fiberglass bodywork	
Track front/rear:	50.4 / 52.4 in (1,280 / 1,330 mm)	
Wheelbase:	84 in (2,134 mm)	
Wheels and tyres:	145 × 10 tyres on 4.5 in (114 mm) rims	
Length × Width × Height:	139 in × 57.5 in × 40.5 in (3,531 mm × 1,460 mm × 1,029 mm)	
Weight:	10 long cwt (1,120 lb; 508 kg)	
Top speed:	95 mph (153 km/h)	113 mph (182 km/h)

== Motorsports ==
In addition to the road cars, the factory produced seven GTs built specifically for competition. The interiors of these cars were stripped of all unnecessary trim and carpeting. Brakes at all four wheels became Cooper 'S' discs, and anti-roll bars were fitted front and rear. Other upgraded components included Rose-jointed suspension links, adjustable dampers, an adjustable brake balance bar, and a rubber bladder fuel tank bag and Monza-type fuel filler cap. Knock-on magnesium Minilite wheels were fitted.

The first Unipower GT built specifically for competition was chassis 766.2. This car was the very first car sold and built using the first production chassis ever completed. In 1966 this car appeared at the 1000 Kilometres of Paris with a 1340 cc engine. This engine was later swapped out for one of just 1102 cc. It would initially be raced nationally in early 1967 by John E. 'Turner' Miles for its owner A.E. Newman. In 1968 it would be bought and raced by Piers Weld-Forester, who later in 1968 would buy the Unipower GT production Rights, before it being raced as a Factory entry in the Nürburgring 500km and Barcelona 12hrs in late 1969.

The third competition car completed was chassis 1266.9. This was the car shown on the Unipower stand at the 1967 Racing Car Show. It featured a Downton tuned 1275 cc Cooper S engine. 1266.9 was purchased by Salisbury tuning firm Janspeed and raced internationally on one occasion in Madrid for them by BMC works driver Geoff Mabbs in the latter half of 1967.

Serial number UWF1007 was a car with special lightweight carbon fibre reinforced fiberglass bodywork made by Specialised Mouldings. Weld-Forester took this car to Le Mans in 1969. The bright yellow GT was given the sobriquet "La puce jaune" ("the yellow flea") by the French observers. The engine was a 1293 cc Cooper S engine tuned by BMC. UWF1007 was clocked at 140 mph (225 km/h) on the Mulsanne Straight, but its co-driver failed to qualify for the race. It later appeared at Mugello. UWF1007 was later fitted with a Cosworth FVA 1600 cc engine.

Other racers were campaigned by John E. Miles (for Em Newman and Gordon Allen), Andrew Hedges, John Blanckley, Stanley Robinson, Roger Hurst, Tom Zettinger and Alberto Ruiz-Thiery who all raced cars on the continent at such venues as Mugello, the Nürburgring, Spa, Barcelona, Jyllandsring, Vila do Conde, Zolder, the Targa Florio and Jarama.

Two Mk1 race cars were also shipped to the US, the first for Paul Richards to race in Group 6 events. Kris Harrison and Bob Barell also raced a Unipower GT at the 1969 6 Hours of Watkins Glen amongst other events whilst Roger Enever and Weld-Forester entered a car for the 12 Hours of Sebring in the same year but did not go.

In addition to the specially prepared competition GTs, several private owners raced their road cars at various venues.

== See also ==
- List of car manufacturers of the United Kingdom
- List of Mini-based cars
