= Universal Power Drives =

British truck and car manufacturer

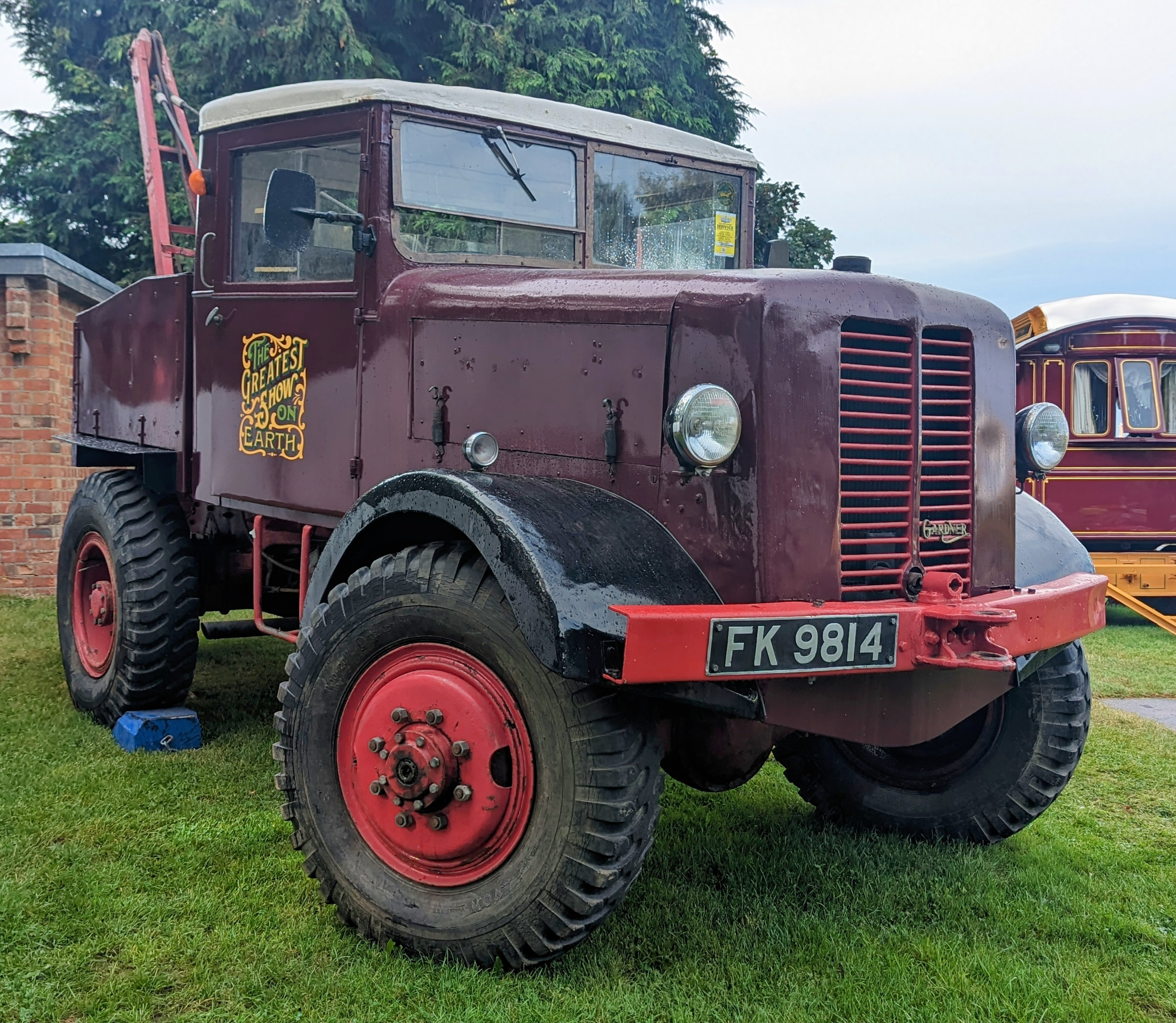
- Unipower Hannibal 4x4 Timber Tractor manufactured in 1940
- Type: Limited
- Industry: Vehicle Manufacturer
- Founded: 1934
- Founder: Tim Powell
- Defunct: 2000
- Fate: Defunct
- Headquarters: England
- Parent: Caterpillar Inc (1977-1994) Alvis PLC (1994-2000)

Universal Power Drives Ltd was a British vehicle manufacturer based in Aintree Road, Perivale, Middlesex. Started in 1934 as 4x4 forestry vehicle manufacturer, later company started manufacturing commercial trucks, the company was acquired by Caterpillar Inc a Illinois based American construction and mining equipment manufacturer in 1977. Later Alvis plc, a London based vehicle manufacturer, acquired the company in 1994 and rebranded it to Alvis-Unipower.

== History ==
Founded in 1934 in Perivale by Tim Powell, Unipower manufactured 4x4 trucks and vehicles for forestry application, focusing on timber industry for England and overseas market. Unipower manufactured forester 4x4, a tractor for timber transportation with an L. Gardner and Sons Gardner 4LW a diesel engine, 10 speed transmission and weighing 4 tons. with their own trucks the company also started to sell modified versions of Dodge, Ford and Rootes trucks by adding multidrive axles to the existing vehicles one of the most notable was the commer six wheeler which was originally manufactured by Rootes and modified by Unipower. In the 1950s the company started to modify the British Motor Corporation (BMC) trucks like the Morris FJ.

== Unipower GT ==
In 1963 Ernie Unger and Valerian Dare-Bryan planned to build a British mid-engine sports car inspired by the Mini, a compact car by BMC. They started to test the test mule and later asked Ron Bradshaw, who was in the Ford GT 40s design team, but they were short on funds for a small scale production and a manufacturing unit. Unger proposed the sports car to Tim Powell, owner of Unipower, who was also Ungers friend. Powell had a second manufacturing unit, which was under producing, so he agreed with the plan to manufacture the car. In 1966, Unipower showcased the sports car at Olympia's Racing Car Show, but without any name.

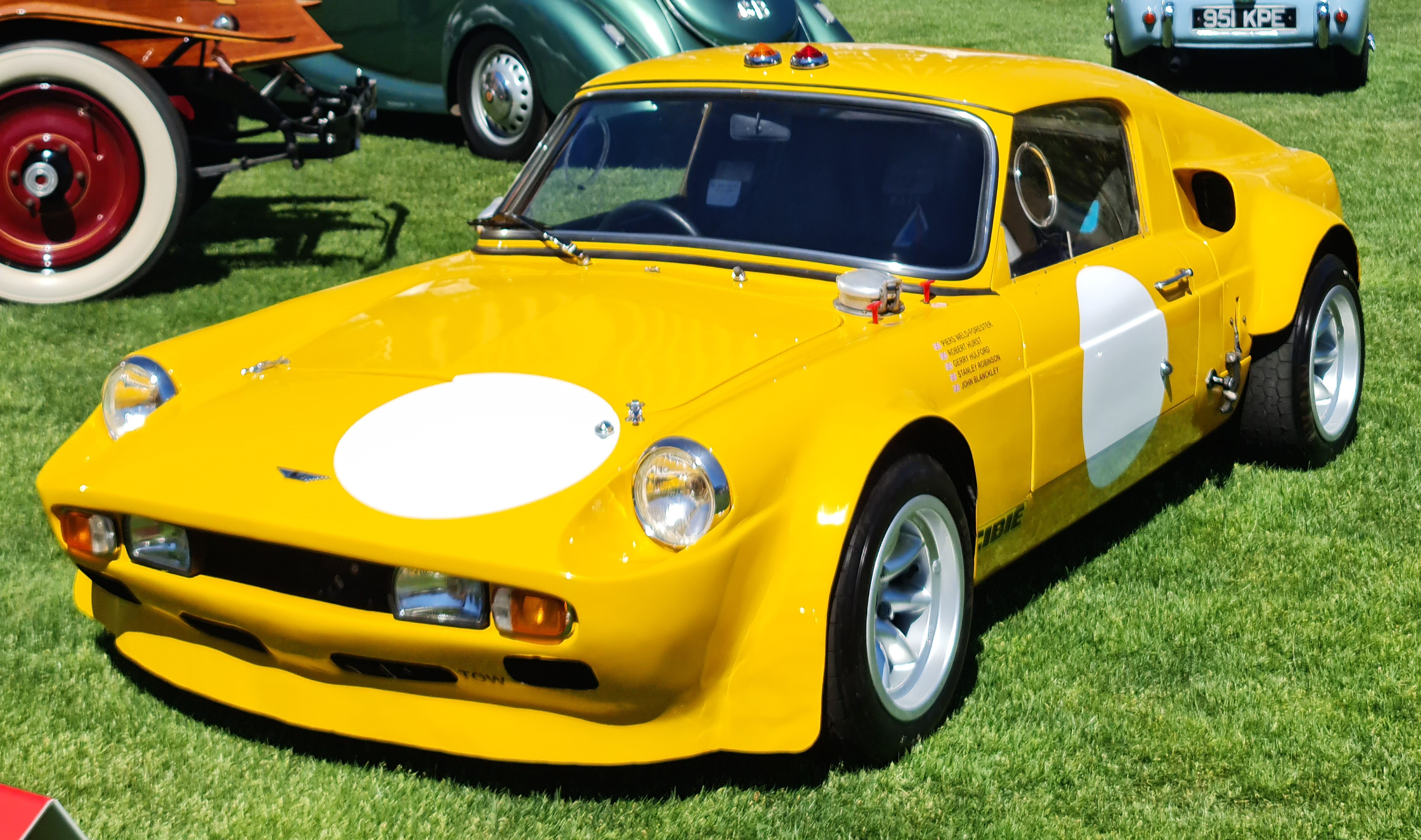
A Unipower GT LC model at London Concours car show in 2021

Initially Hustler was proposed as the name, but later Unipower used it for one of its forklift truck models. Ian Smith, the organizer of Olympia's Racing Car Show, needed to submit the press release in a hurry, ended up calling it the Unipower GT. The car was very well received by the public, gaining its nickname as mini-Miura coming from Lamborghini Miura. The GT was produced from 1966 to 1969, but because the company was facing funding issues, production was suspended.

== Quasar ==
In 1967 Nguyen Manh Khanh (Quasar Khanh) a Vietnamese designer approached Unipower to manufacture a transparent utility vehicle. He designed a box like car nicknamed as Cube, the vehicle had transparent glass on all four sides and roof with a seating capacity of six. This made it a perfect vehicle for factories and warehouses as a promotional vehicle, powered by a 1100cc BMC engine and automatic transmission.

The car was featured in 'Elle Boit Pas, Elle Fume Pas, Elle Drague pas, Mais... Elle Cause!' a French movie in which it was driven by Mireille Darc. A total of 15 units were manufactured out of which 13 were exported to France to vehicle manufacturers. Today the cars are preserved and have a cult status.

== Heavy Haulage ==
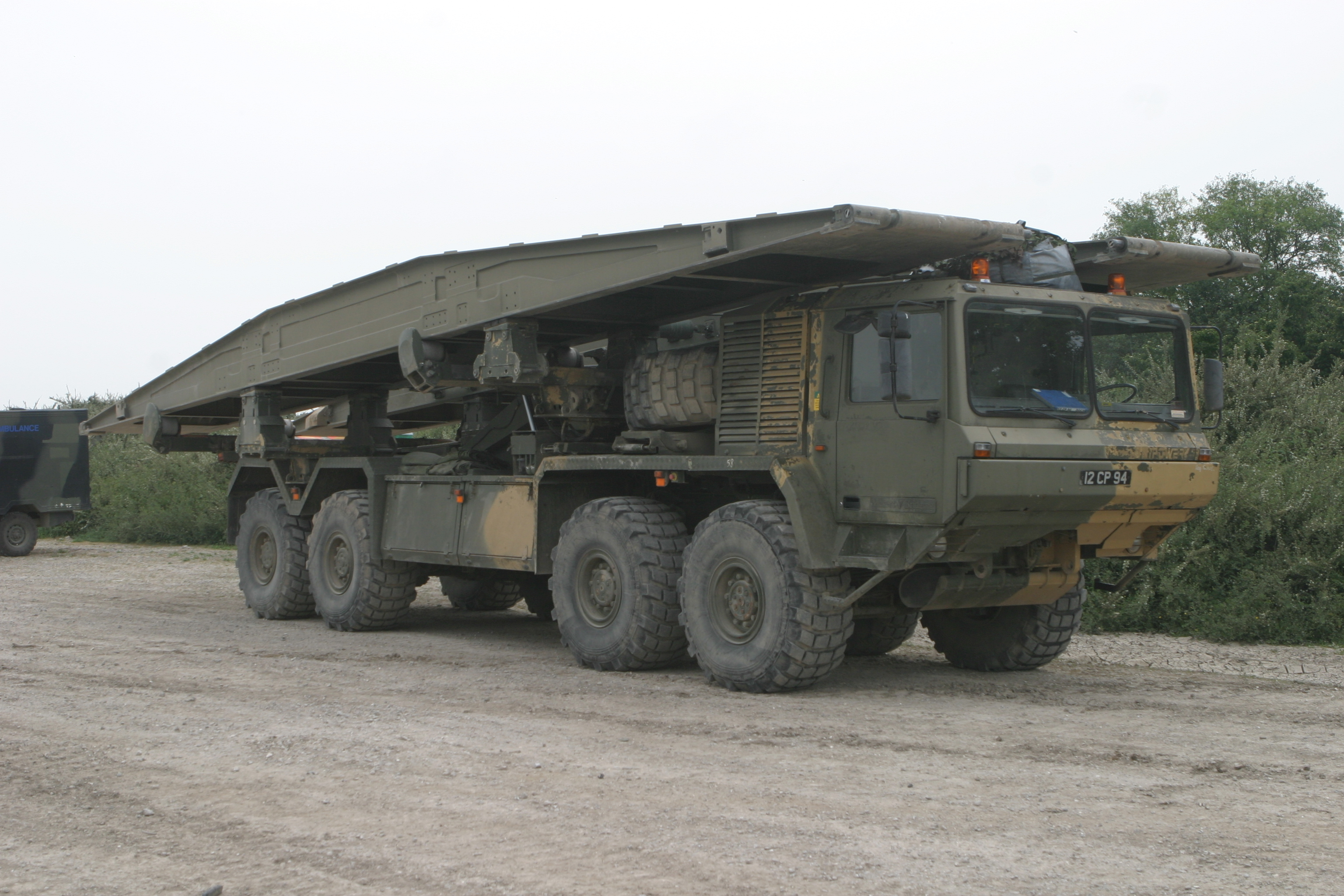
British army Armoured vehicle-launched bridge based in a Unipower M series.

In 1970 Unipower came up with the Invader 4x4 truck, based on the Leyland Mastiff with 16 ton capacity, and a 26 ton capability as a tractor-trailer combination. The truck was powered by a Perkins Engines V8.510 diesel engine, giving output of 179 hp, supported by a five speed transmission. The company also made a special wrecker/recovery vehicle for Dial-Holmes, utilising a modified chassis, which had a boom and winch to recover vehicles up to 30 tons. The wrecker also had bigger tires on it

In 1988 Unipower acquired Scammell, a heavy-duty tractor manufacturer based in Watford. After the purchase, Unipower came up with the C series, a successor to the Scammell S24, using a Volvo F12 cab. In 1993 they delivered 129 units of the 8x8 variant to the ministry of defense. These were equipped with Perkins Eagle engines, and ZF gearbox. In 1995 They came with civilian versions of the tractor with 465 hp Cummins engine and ZF gearboxes alongside bllast tractor units were manufactured with 150 tons GVW. Vickers plc supplied Royal Army Of Oman with 18 units of C series 6x6 ballast tractors equipped with 600 hp Cummins engines and ZF gearbox with Nicolas hydraulic modular trailers as tank transporters.

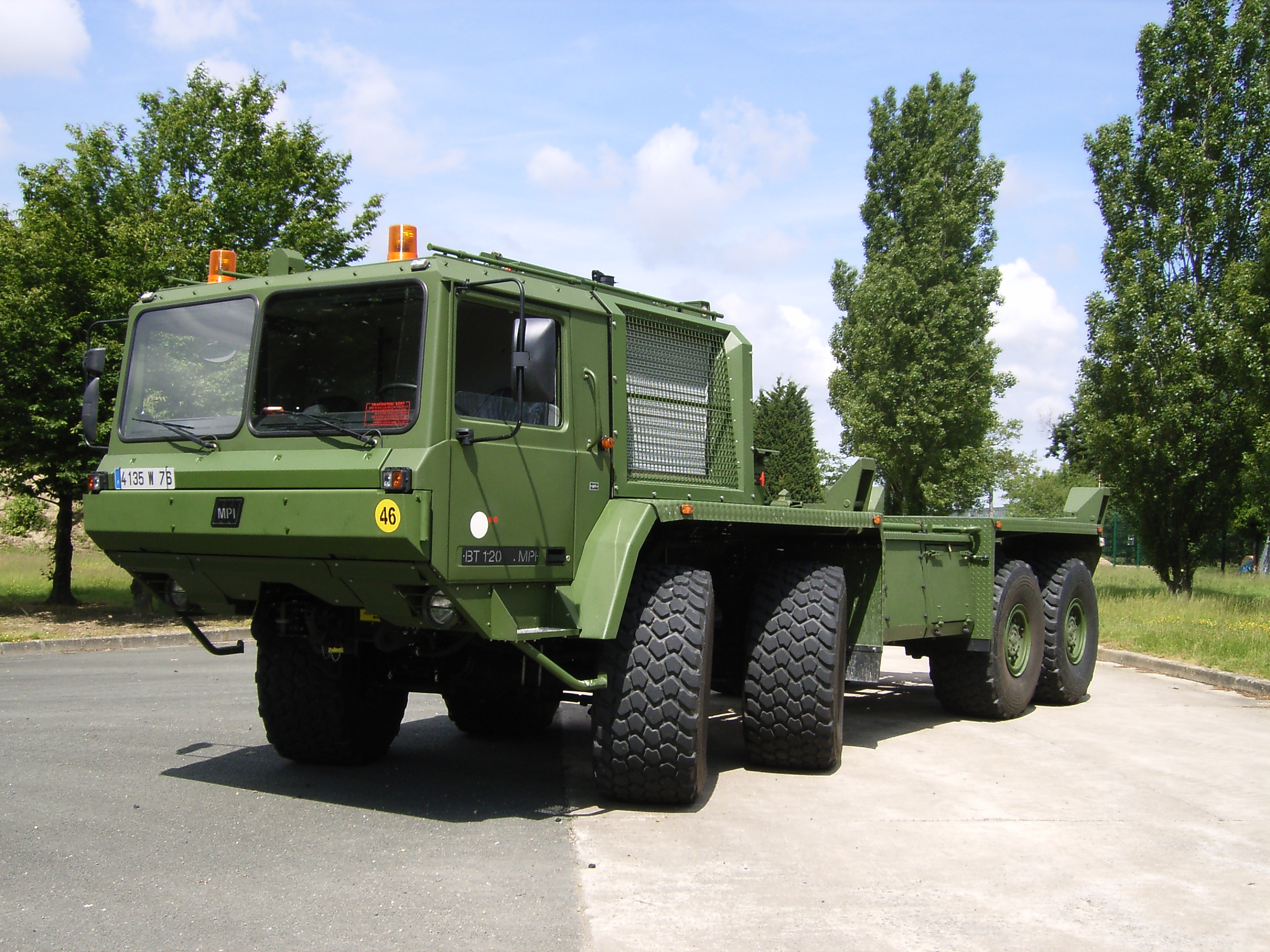
MPI VPCM BT120 at Angers

Unipower manufactured the M series in 1994 under the new branding of Alvis-Unipower. The M series, an 8x8 chassis, powered by 400 hp Cummins or Perkins engines, coupled to a ZF gearbox, was built with defence in mind, primarily for small tanks, landing gear, floating bridges and portable bridges. Later MH chassis was developed with 6x6 and 8x8 configuration, the 6x6 named as MH-6660 had a six cylinder Cummins engine producing 600 hp and a GCW of 110 tons whereas the 8x8 chassis had a 750 hp Cummins and five speed ZF transmission.

In 2002, the rights of the M series were bought by Matériels Portuaires et Industriels (MPI), a subsidiary of Nicolas (Transporter Industry International). They manufactured the Véhicule porte-conteneurs maritimes (VPCM), a specialized container transporter for defence to transport 20 ft intermodal containers over difficult terrain. An 8x8 rigid chassis, this was powered by 400 hp Cummins engine.

Following their elimination from the bidding process for the UK Ministry of Defence's Heavy Equipment Transporter (HET) project, Alvis announced their intention to seek a new owner for Alvis Unipower.

== Airport Crash Tender ==
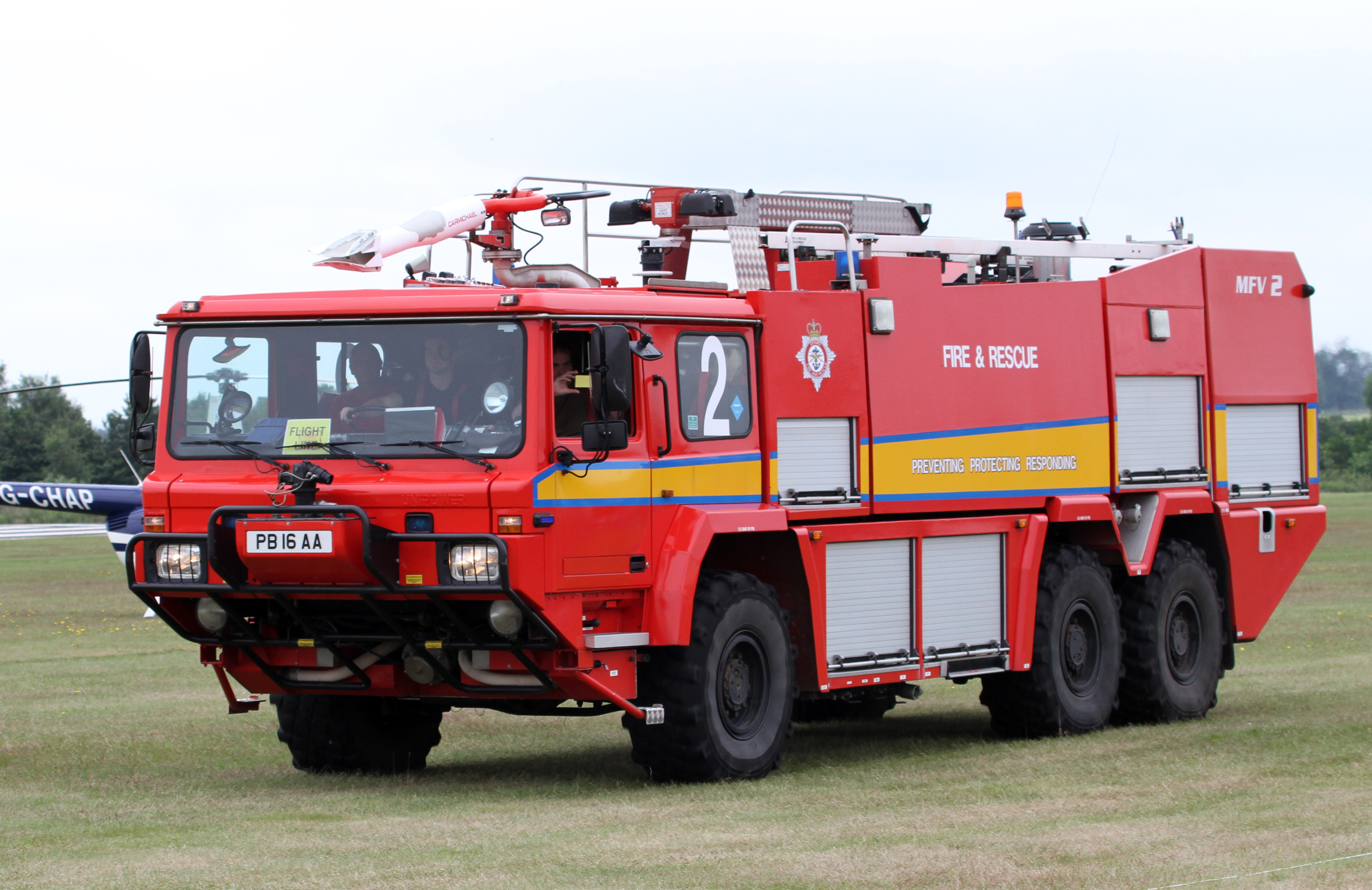
A Unipower MFV 6x6 engine at Cosford Air Show in 2016

In 1975 Chubb Fire & Security a British safety company built Unipower R 44 GPr-3000 an airport crash tender built on Reynolds Boughton truck 4x4 chassis powered by a Rolls-Royce petrol engine giving output of 275 hp with top speed of 120kmph. These were manufactured for Poland civil aviation.

In the 1990s, Unipower manufactured Airport crash tenders as MOD planned to replace the old fleet with two new vehicles Rapid Intervention Vehicle (RIV) a lightweight quick response vehicle and Major foam vehicle (MFV) for large fires and crashes. These vehicles were built with 20 years of duty in mind.

RIV was built on a 4x4 chassis with 2275ltr water tank and 275ltr foam tank powered by a turbocharged Detroit Diesel engine putting out 475 hp helping it achieve 120kmph top speed.

MFV was built on a 6x6 chassis 5600ltr water tank and 680ltr of foam tank, this one was powered by a Caterpillar diesel engine putting out 700 hp.

== Trojan 8870 Ballast Tractor ==
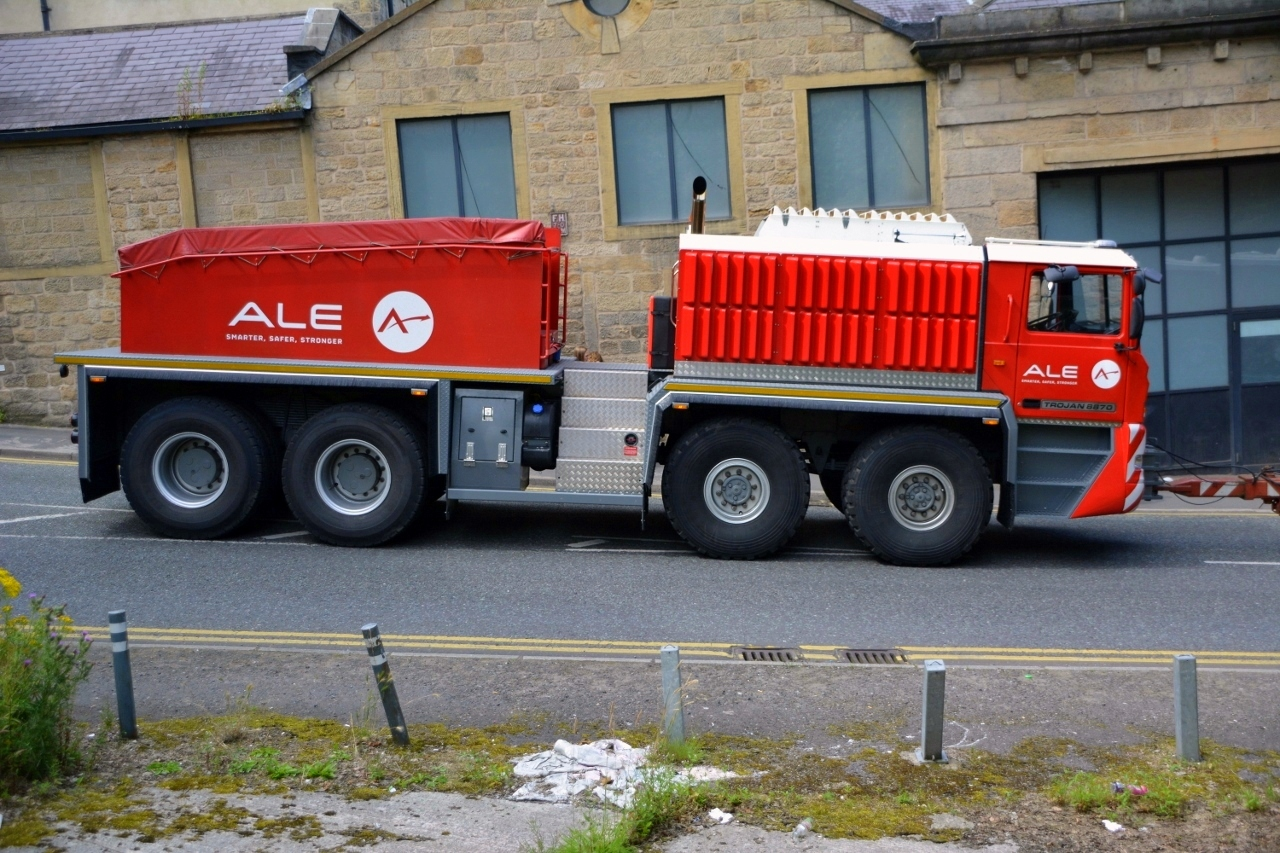
ALE Trojan 8870 ballast tractor in Leeds (2016)

In 2012 Abnormal Load Engineering (ALE), now Mammoet, decided to build new ballast tractors to move heavy loads and replace their older Alvis-Unipower MH8875 which was built by Unipower for demonstration purposes for Heavy Equipment Transport System. Unipower were unsuccessful and the contract was given to Oshkosh Corporation. They purchased six units of MH-8875 from French Army. They modified these units to their needs with better engines, gearboxs, braking, cabins, and tires. The tractor featured a Volvo Penta turbo inline six intercooled engine, Allison six speed automatic transmission, Kessler auxiliary transmission, Kessler axles, Hendrickson leaf springs, ABS, Dana hub reduction and soundproof cabin.

The 48 kerb weight ballast tractor has a GCW of 400 tons using a suitable hydraulic modular trailer. The tractor also featured an Electronic Controller Area Network Bus System which helps one tractor to communicate with others this helps when more than one tractor units is coupled and there is no limit on how many units are coupled heavier loads the system synchronize the engine output, gear, steering, braking, rpm and torque.

== See also ==
- Unipower GT
- Alvis PLC
- Quasar-Unipower
- British Motor Corporation
- Rootes Group
- Caterpillar Inc

== Bibliography ==
- Davies, Peter J. (2000). The World Encyclopedia of Trucks. Lorenz Books. ISBN 0-7548-0518-2.
