= List of microcars =

World's smallest automobiles

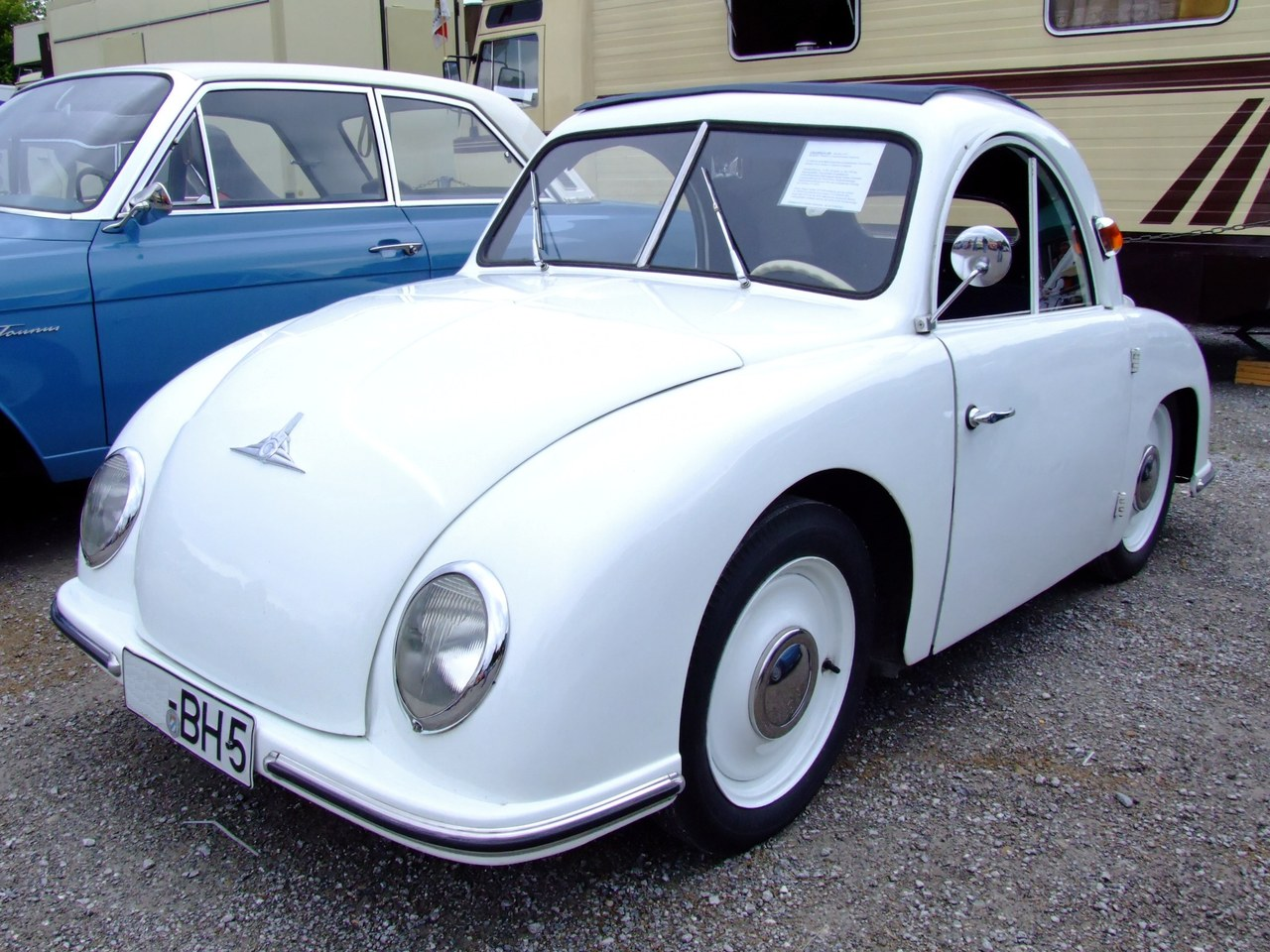
The Champion 400, a German microcar built in 1952

This is a list of microcars by country of origin. This list excludes cars over 700 cc and cars where production or manufacture ended before 1945.

Microcars have been defined as "very compact, small-engined cars, designed for use in large cities, especially in Japan". even though in Japan such cars are known as kei cars. Microcars have also been defined as being a "small car, popular in the 1950s, that featured a body offering full weather protection and mechanics often derived from motorcycle technology", though in the 1950s, a trend towards egg-shaped cars with a relatively large ratio of windows to bodywork meant that the affectionate term bubble car was used.

The term microcar is usually applied only to such small cars built after World War II; cars built prior to the war are more generally referred to as cyclecars. However, one dictionary definition states simply that a microcar is "a small fuel-efficient automobile".

An attempt at a more specific definition for microcars suggested by some enthusiasts is "economy vehicles with either three or four wheels, powered by petrol engines of no more than 700 cc or battery electric propulsion, and manufactured since 1945".

In short, defining what is or what is not a microcar is not an exact science. Microcar is a subjective common noun, so no list will ever be definitive. But with museums devoted solely to microcars, numerous published encyclopedias of microcars and microcar enthusiast clubs worldwide, this list is an attempt to collate as many of these vehicles as possible into a common grouping.

== Gallery ==
Microcar gallery

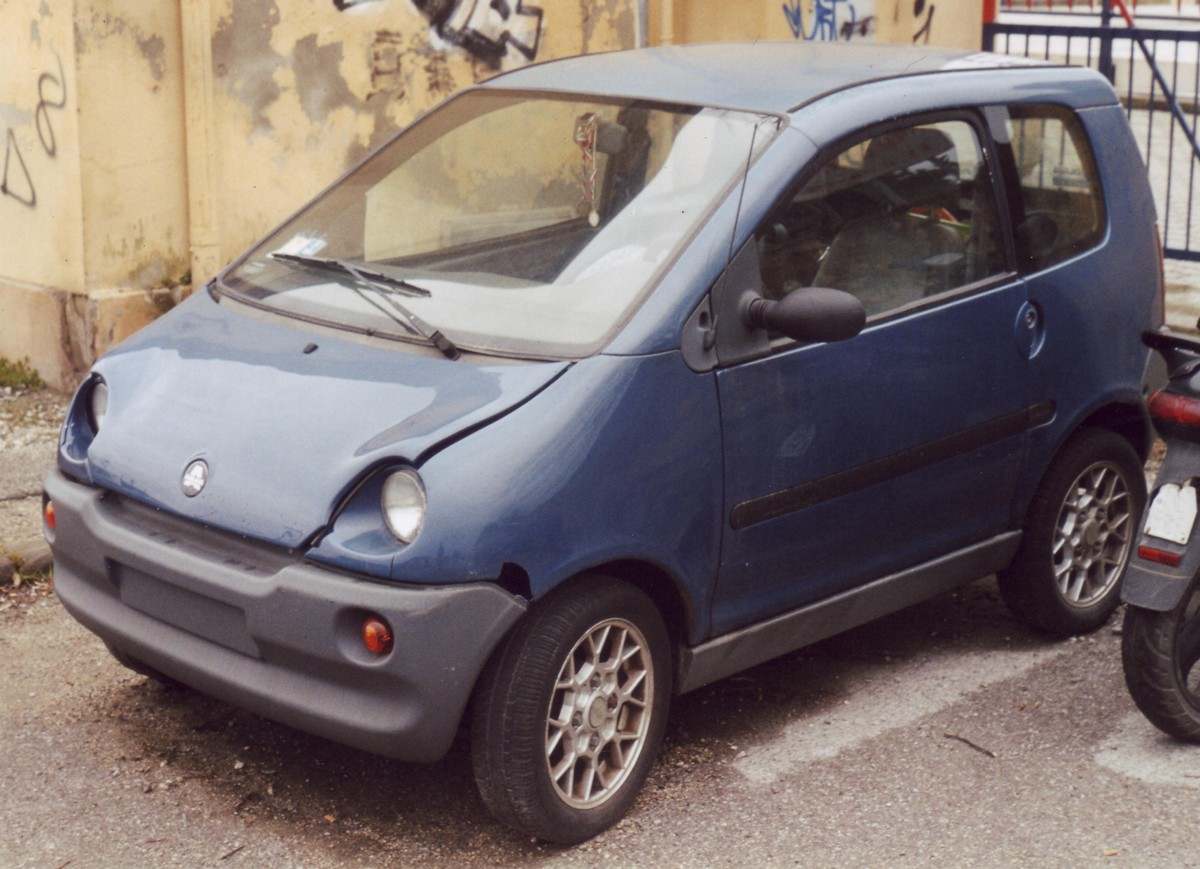
Aixam 400

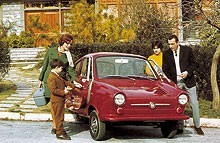
Alta A200

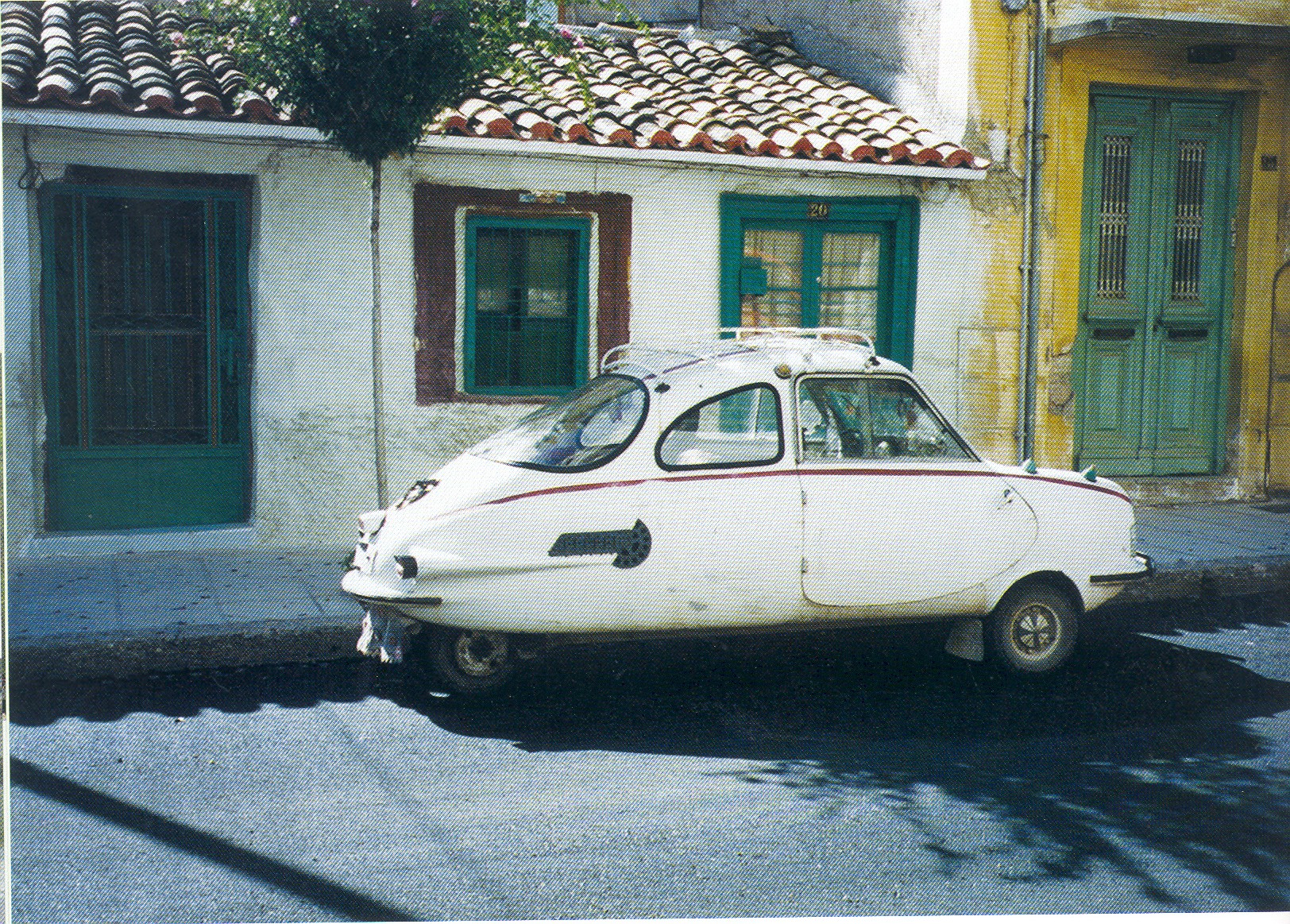
Attica 200

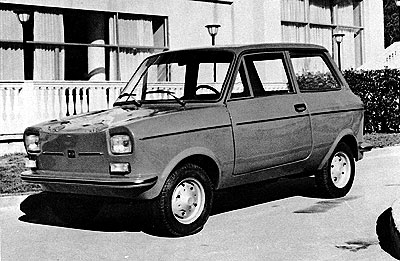
Attica DIM 652

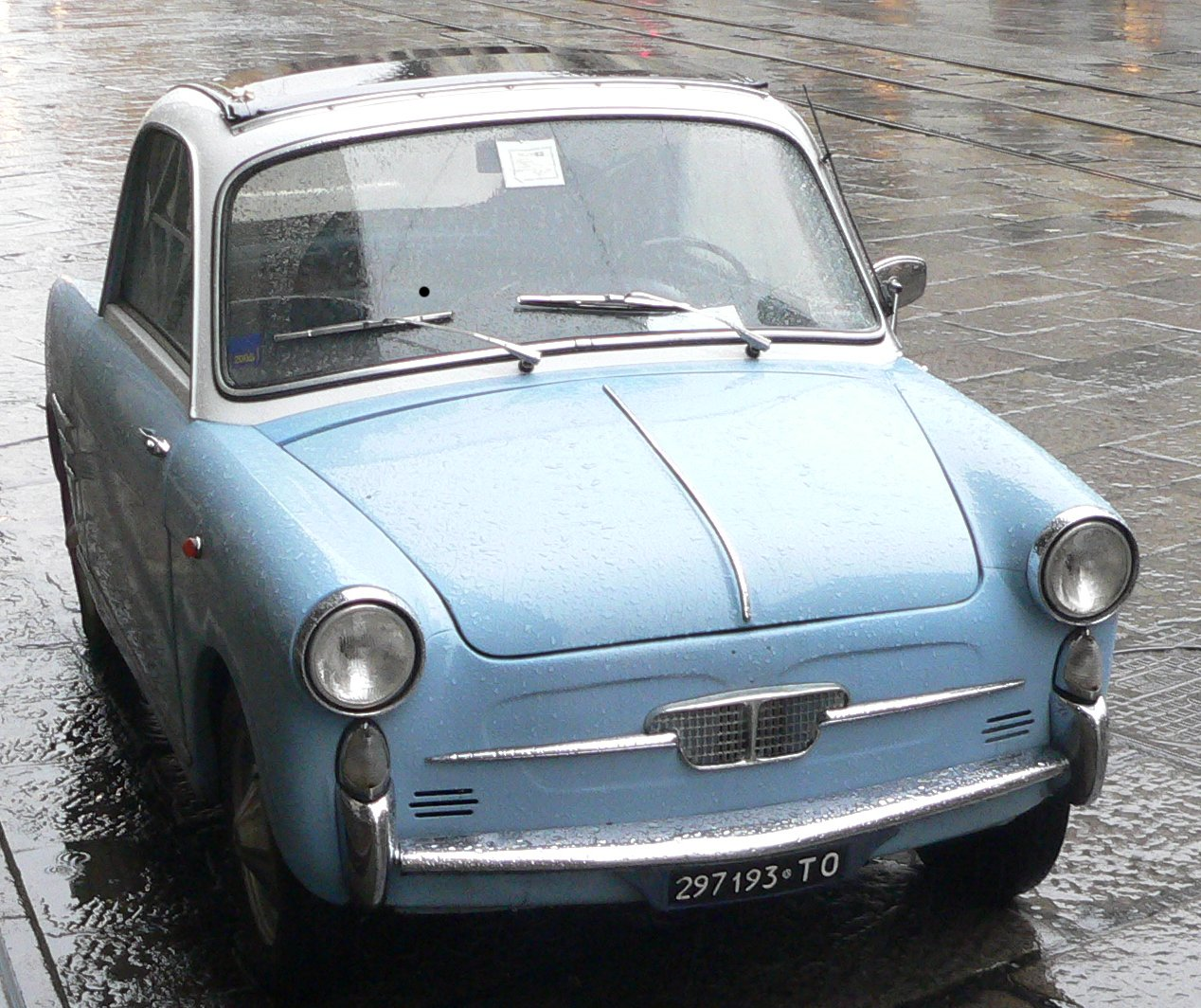
Autobianchi Bianchina Trasformabile

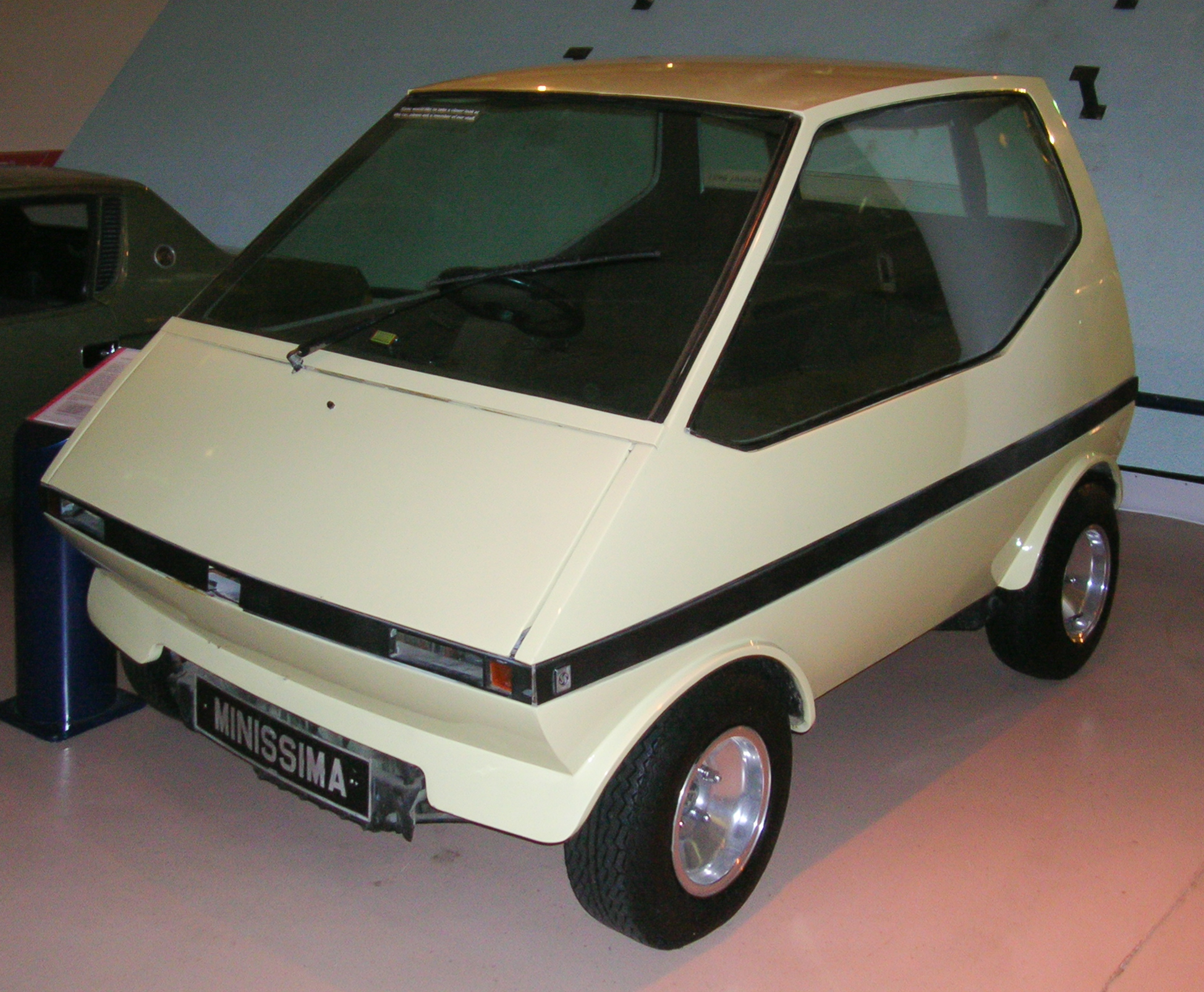
BLMC Minissima

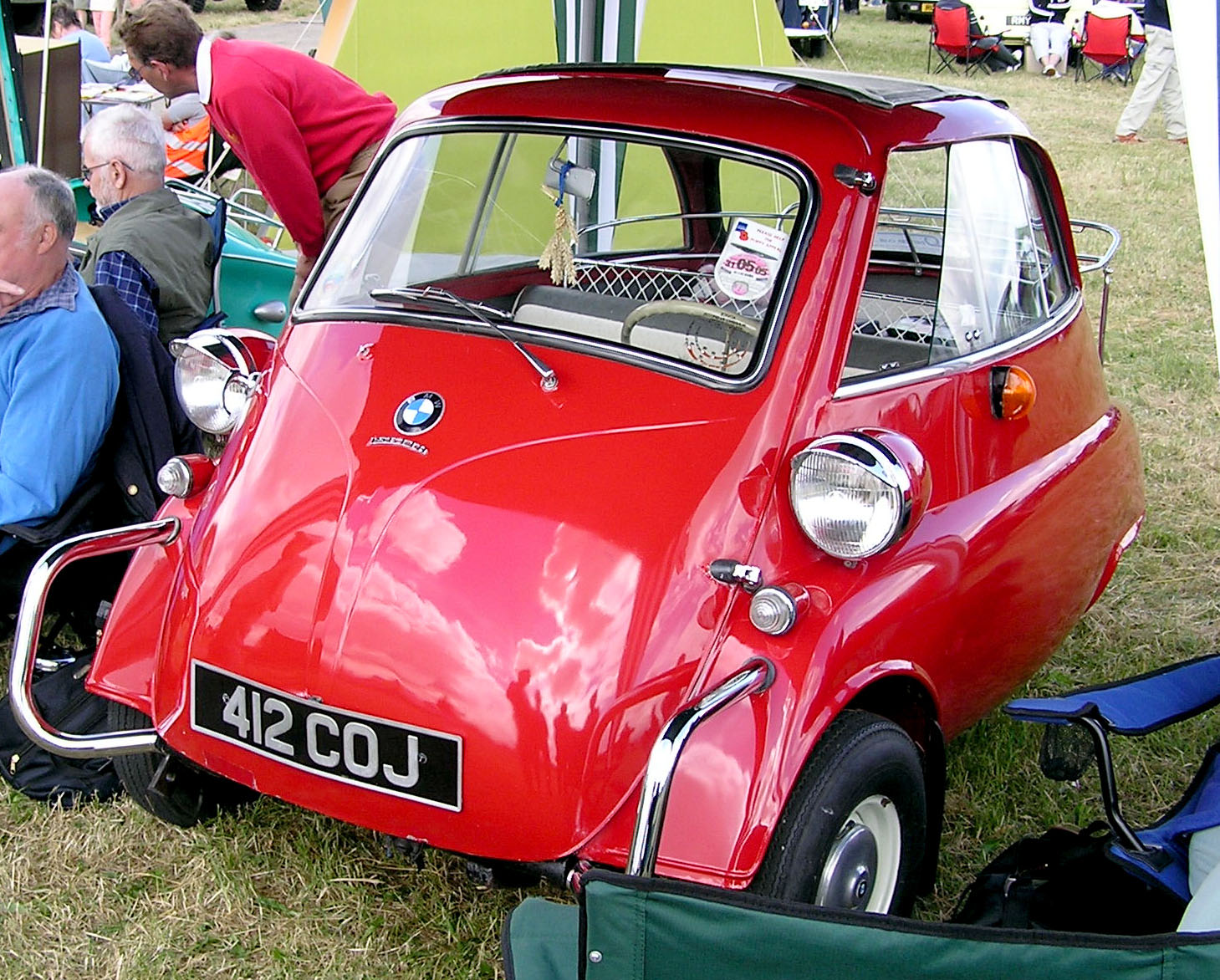
BMW Isetta 300

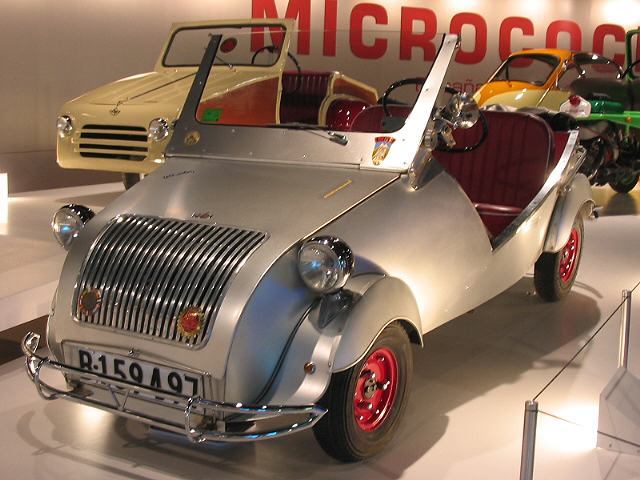
Biscúter 100

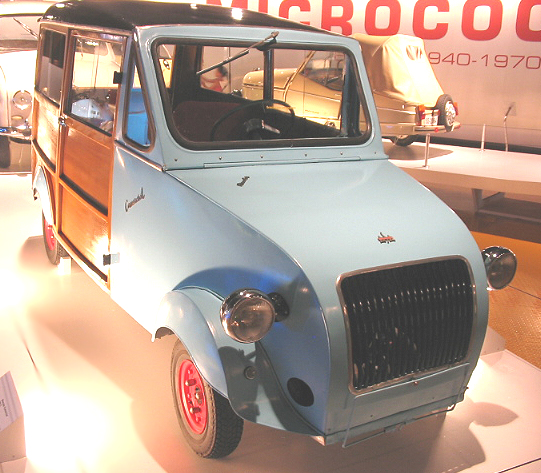
Biscúter Comercial 200C

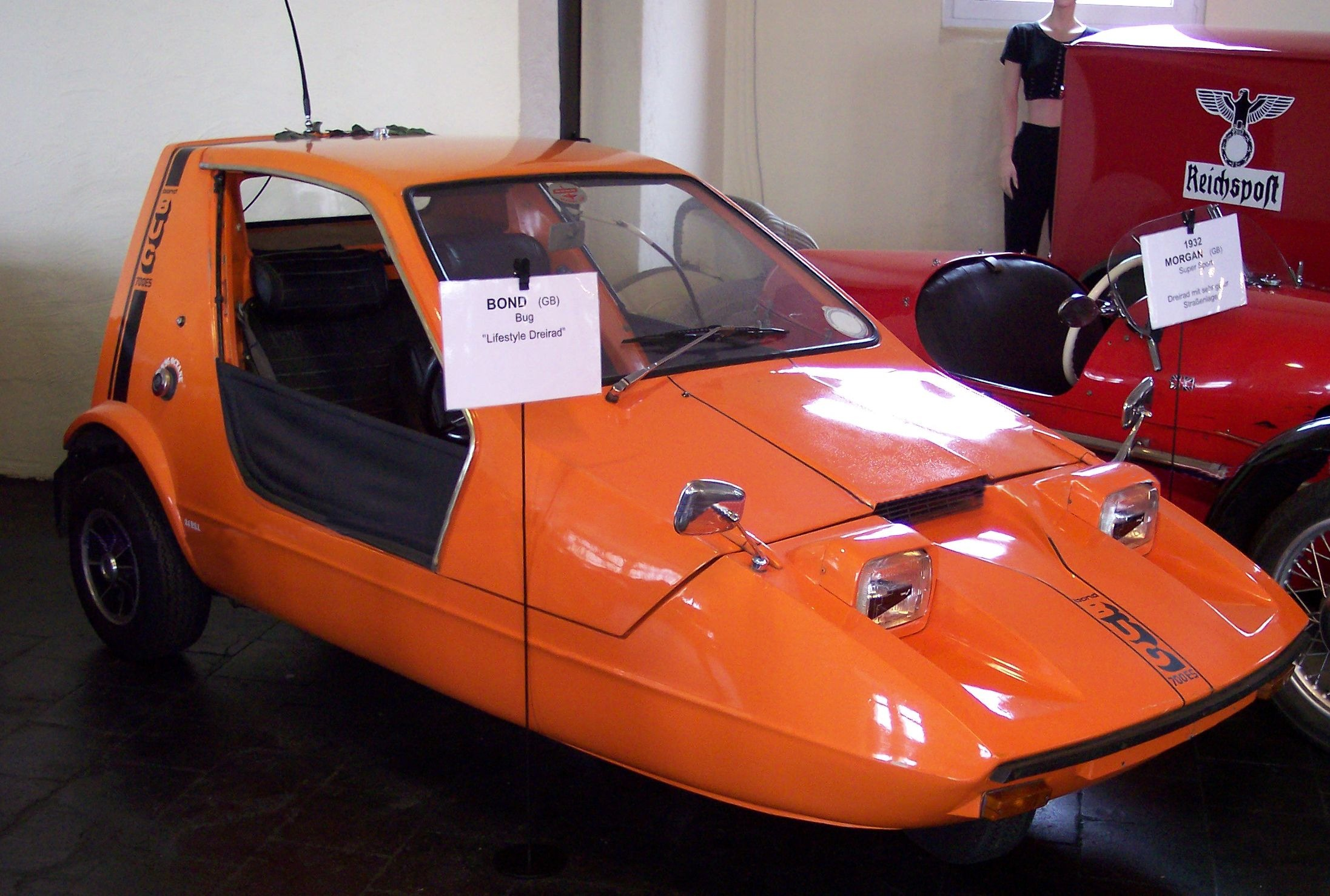
Bond Bug

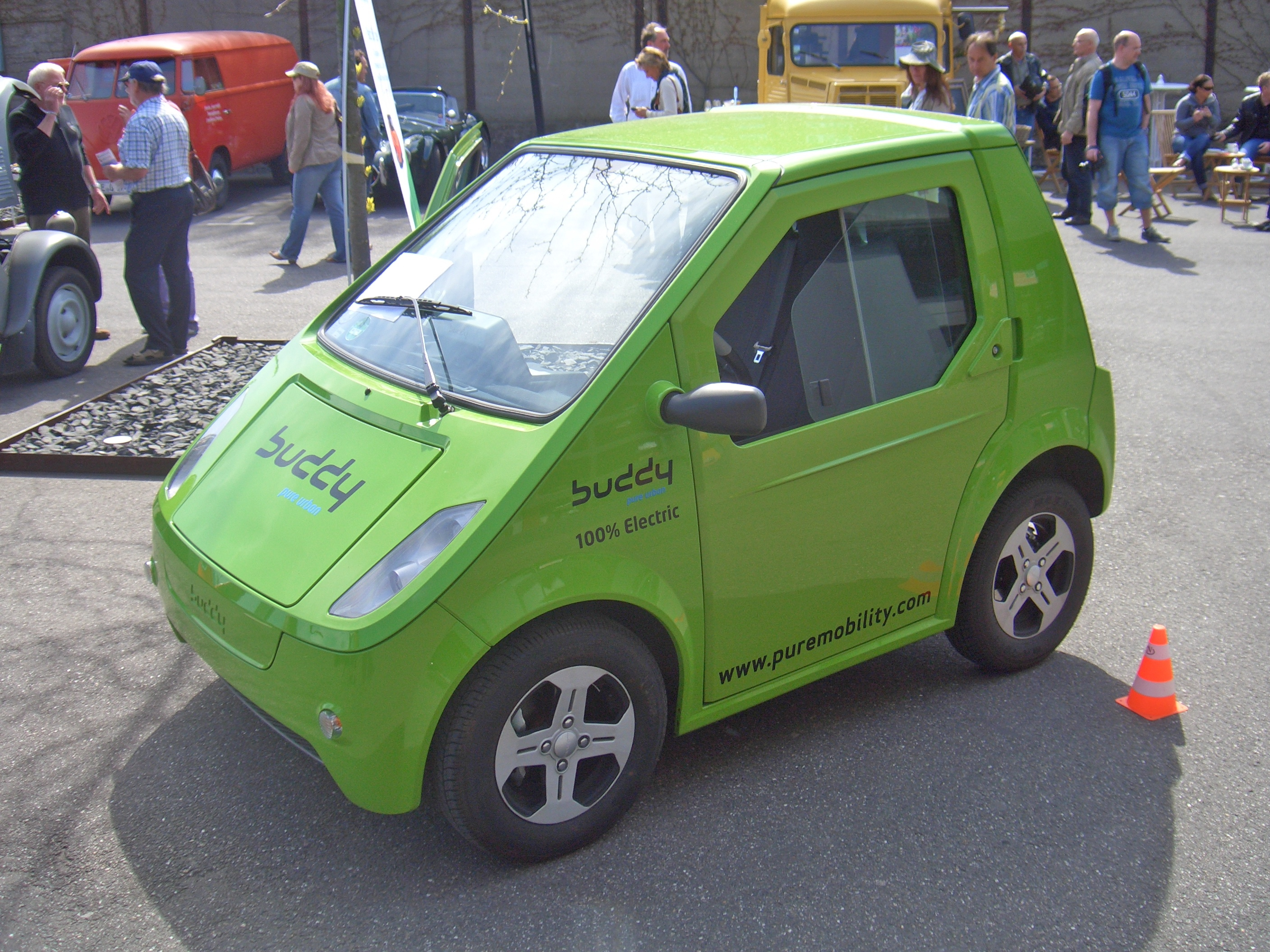
Buddy

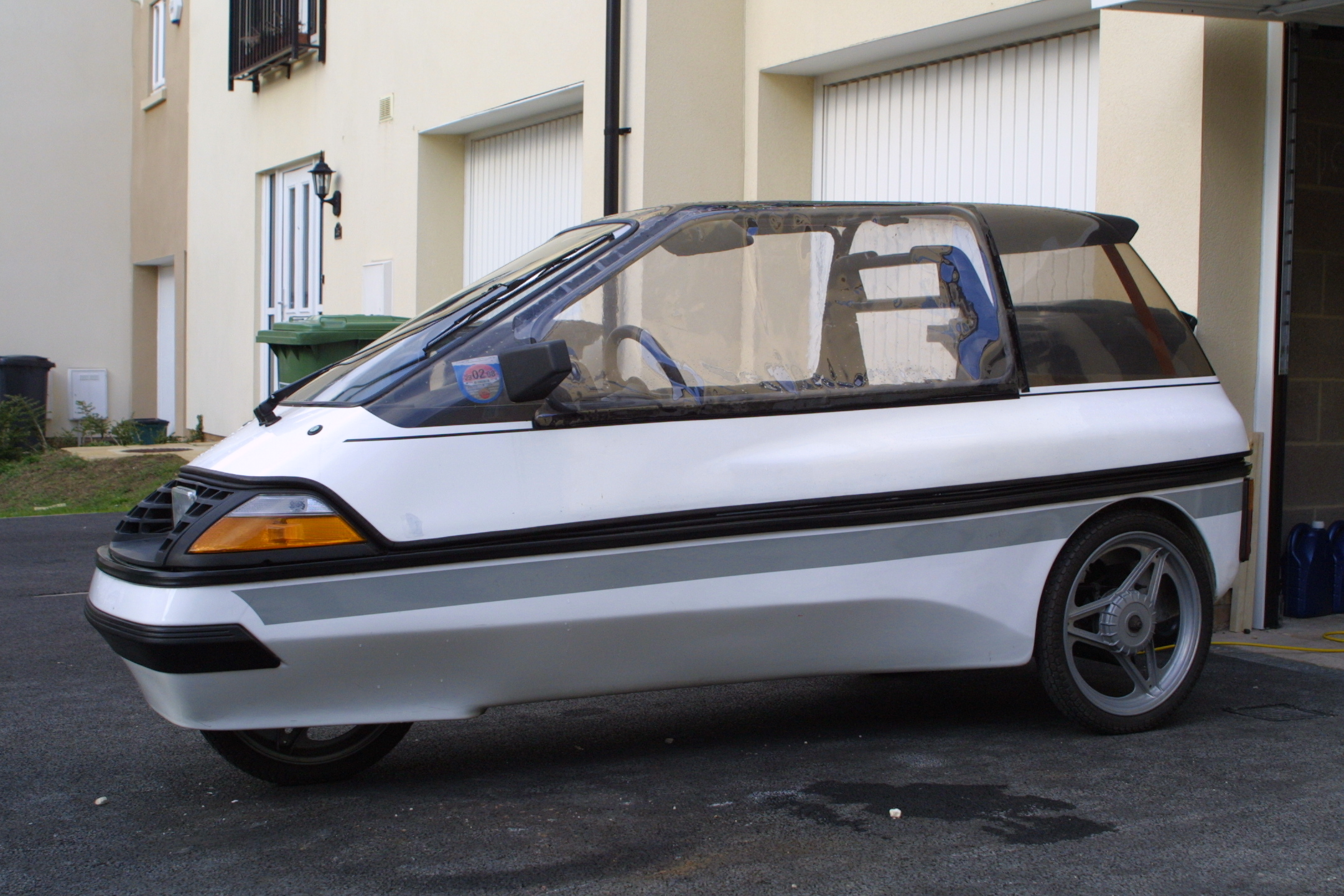
CityEl

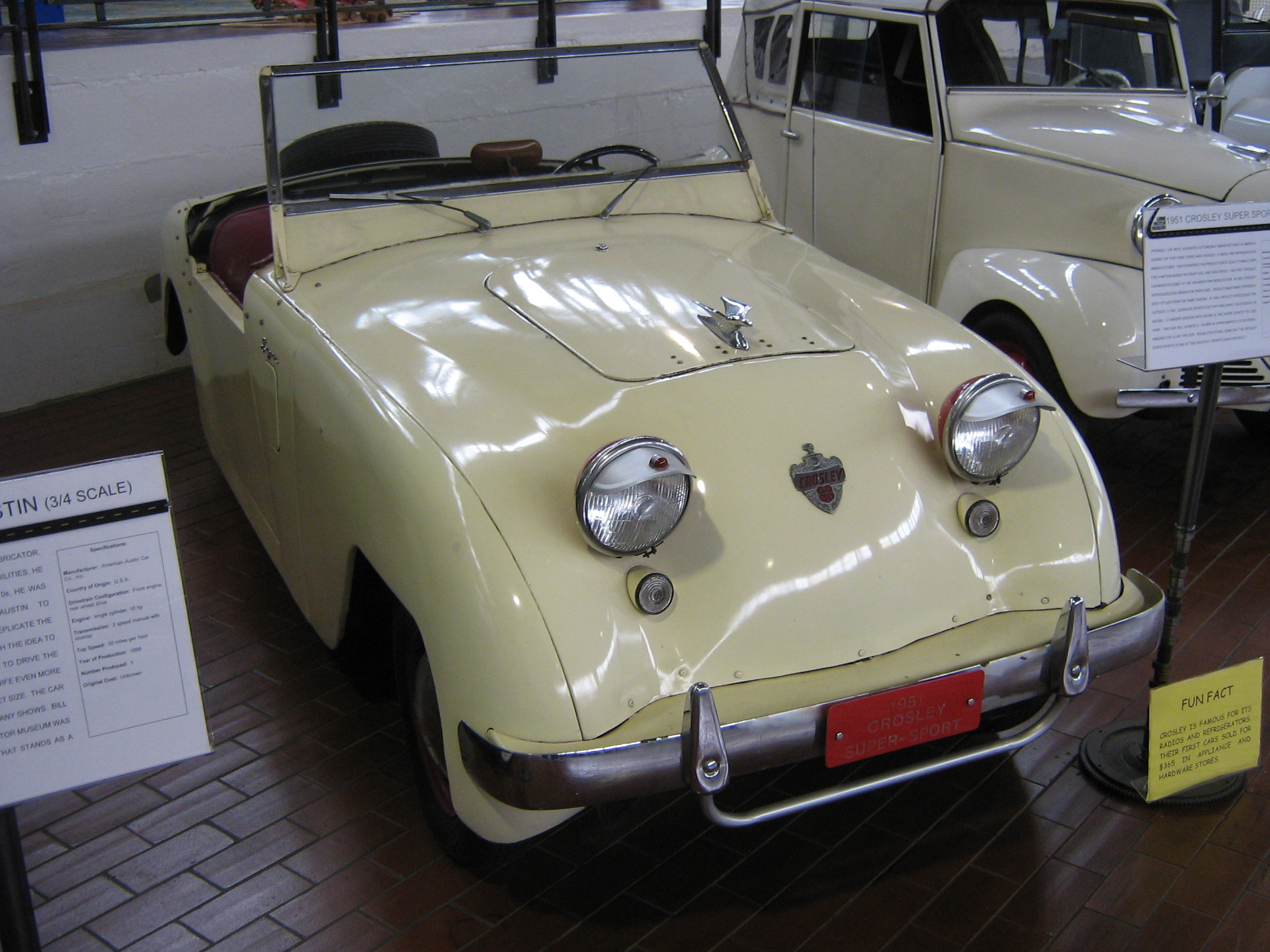
Crosley Super Sport

Cub Commuter

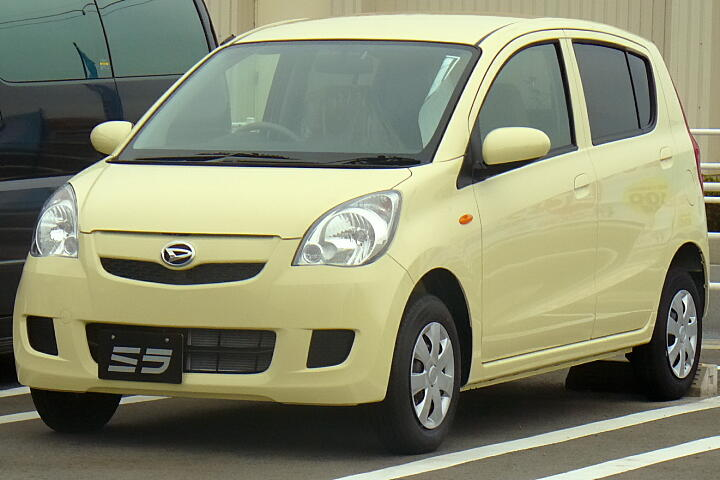
Daihatsu Mira 7th Generation

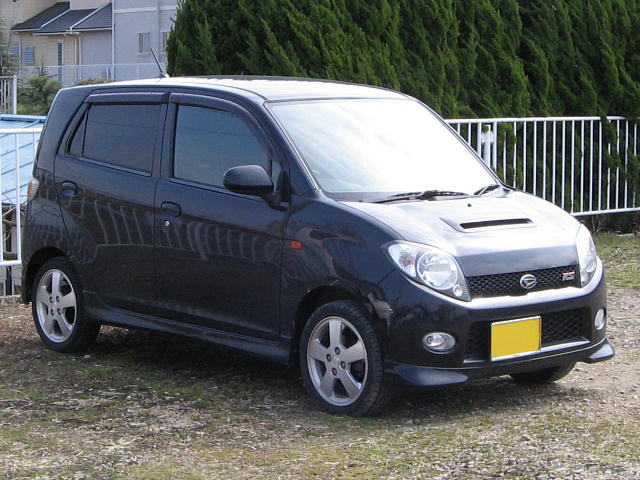
Daihatsu Fellow Max

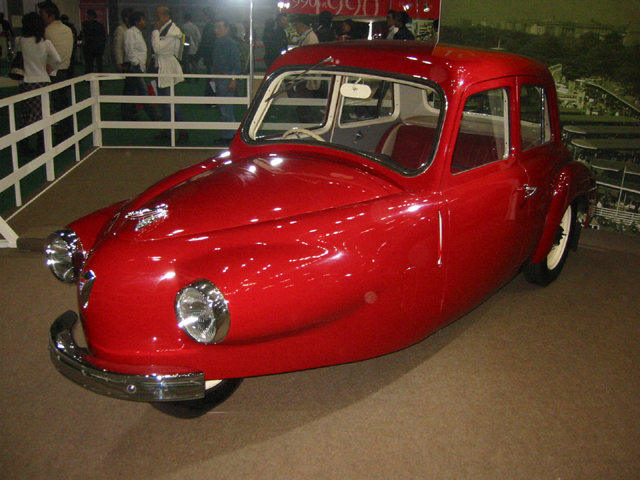
Daihatsu Bee

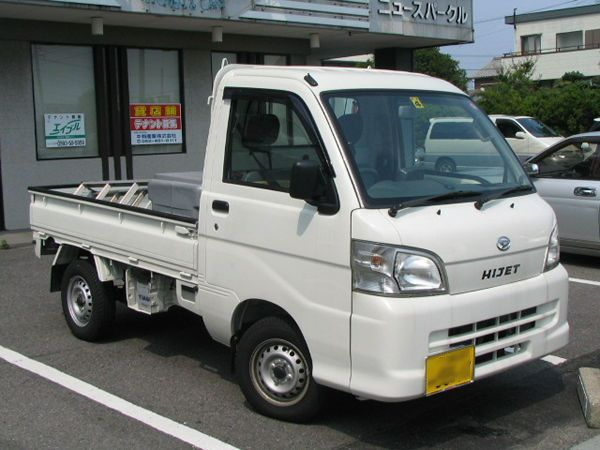
Daihatsu Hijet / Piaggio Porter

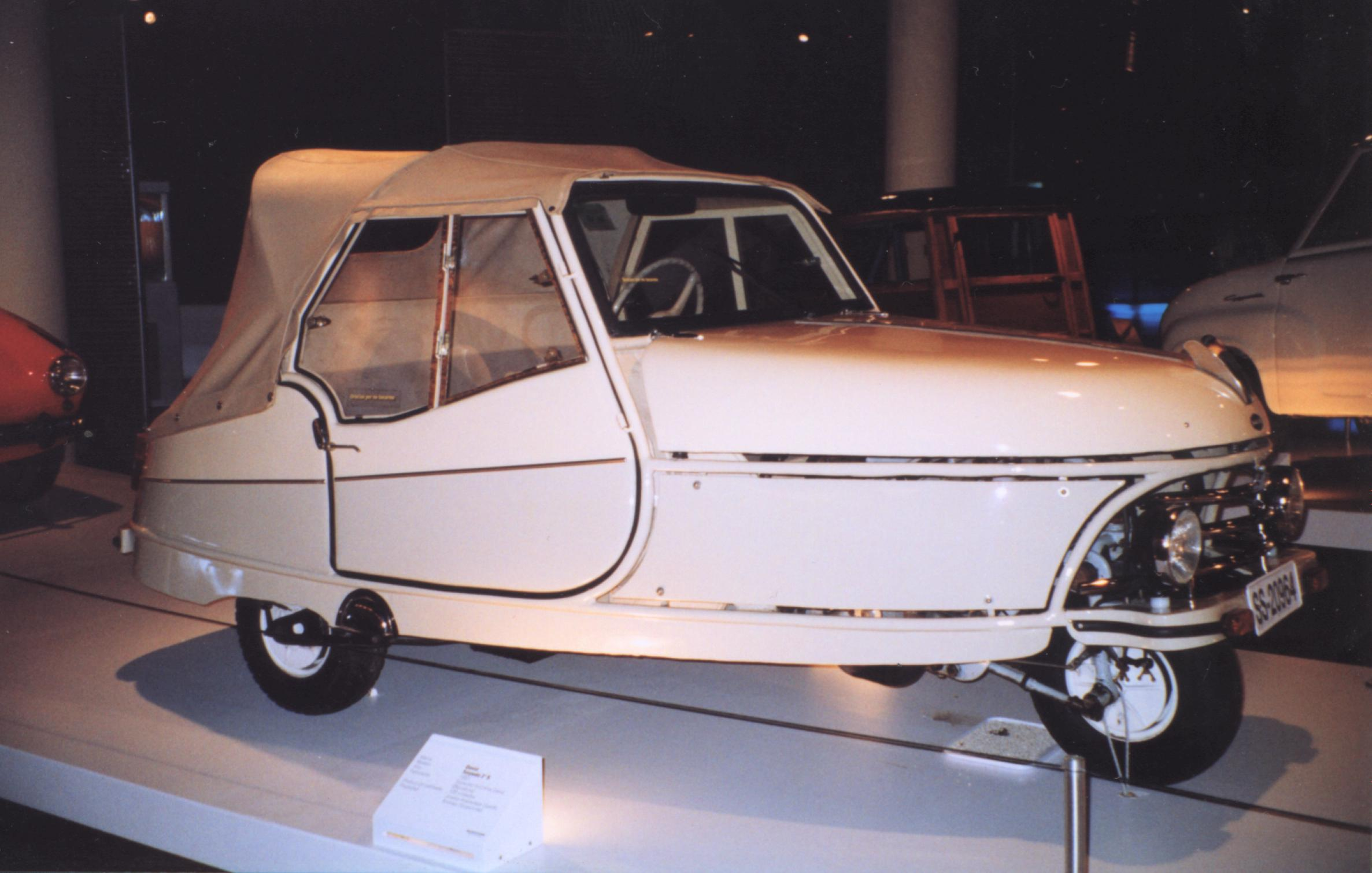
David Torpedo 2 S

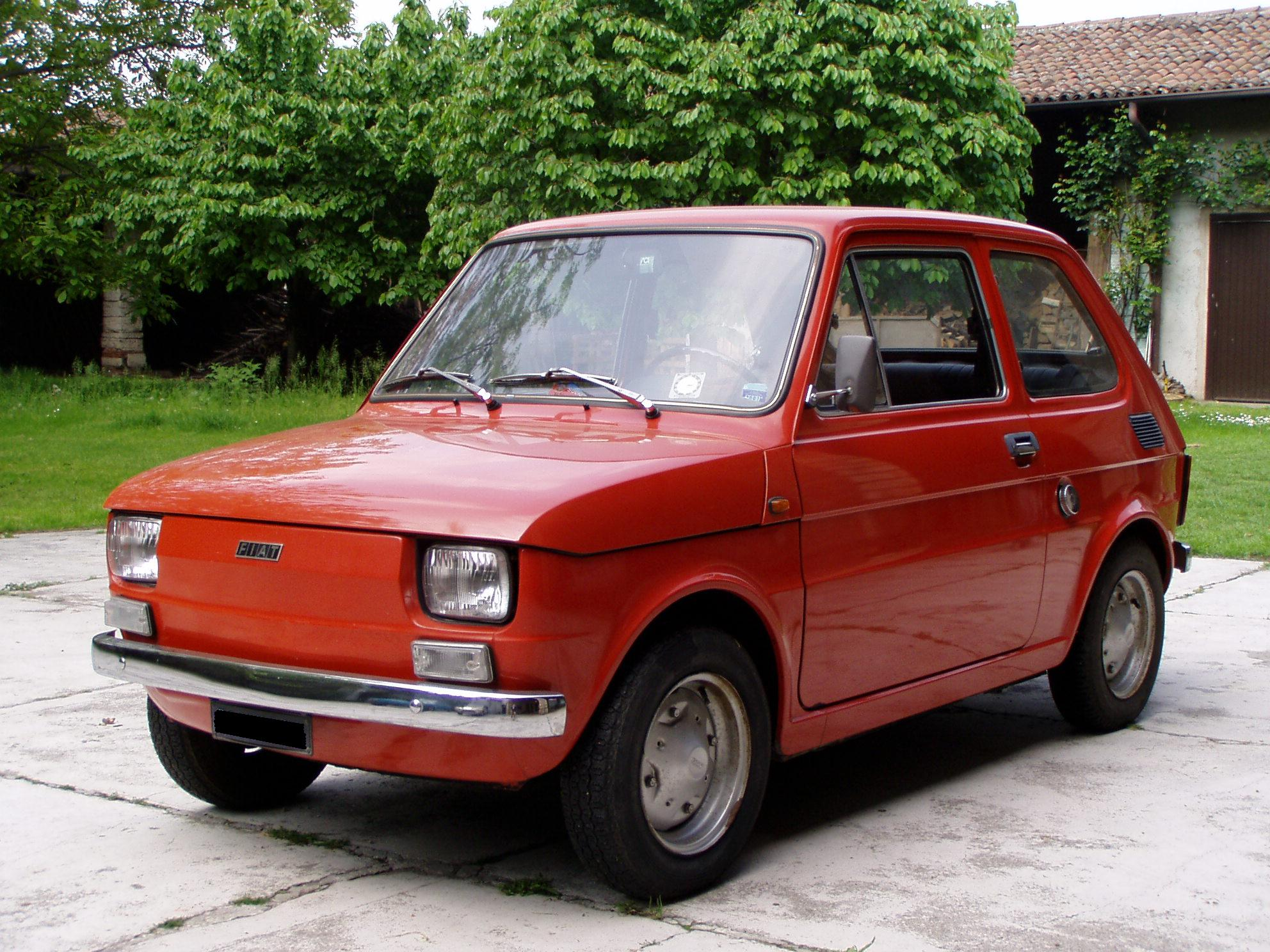
Fiat 126

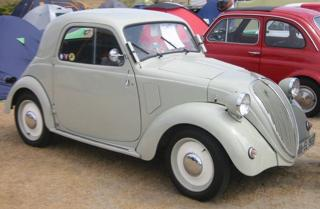
Fiat 500 Topolino

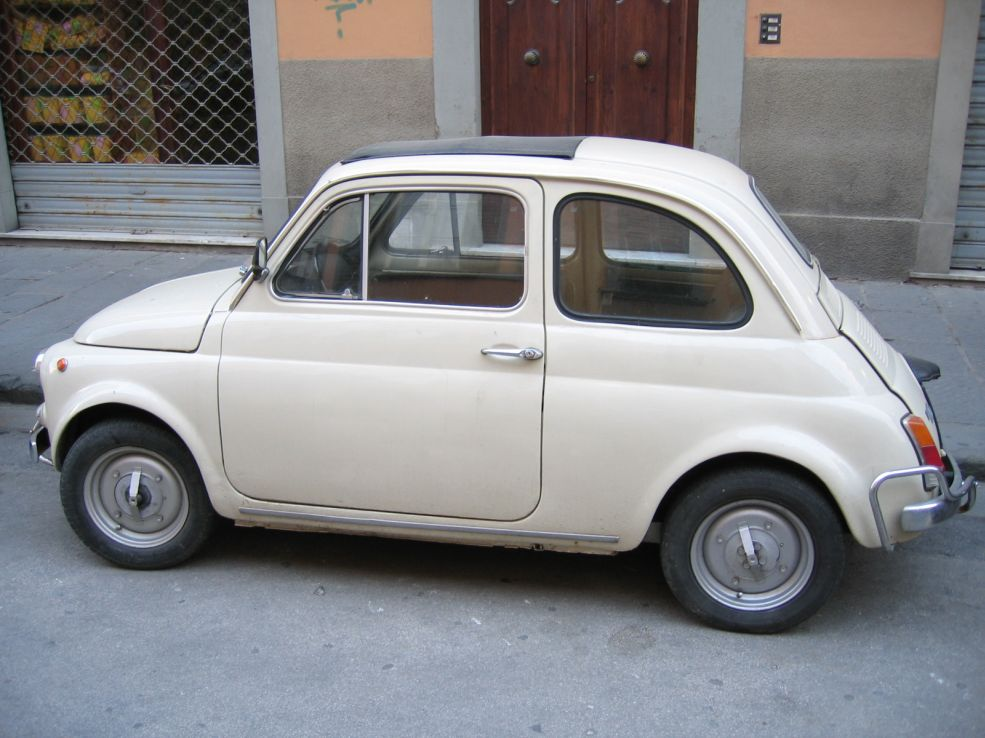
Fiat 500

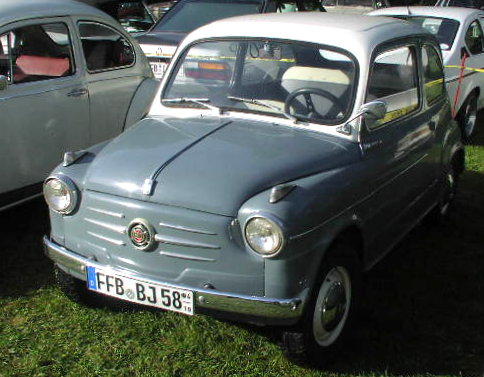
Fiat 600

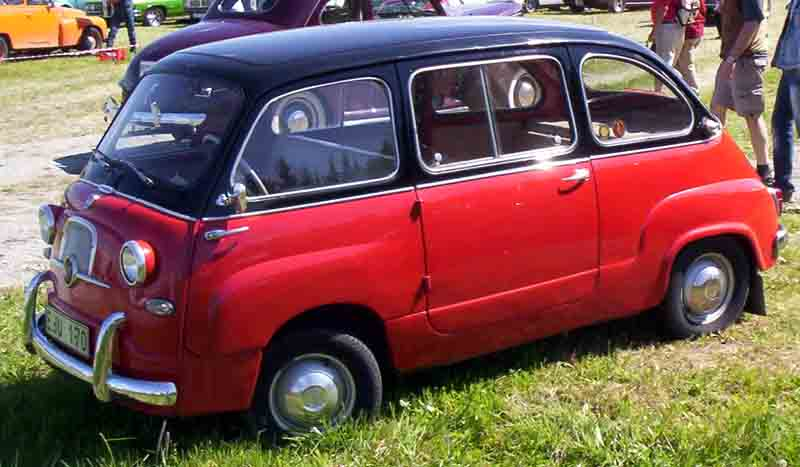
Fiat 600 Multipla

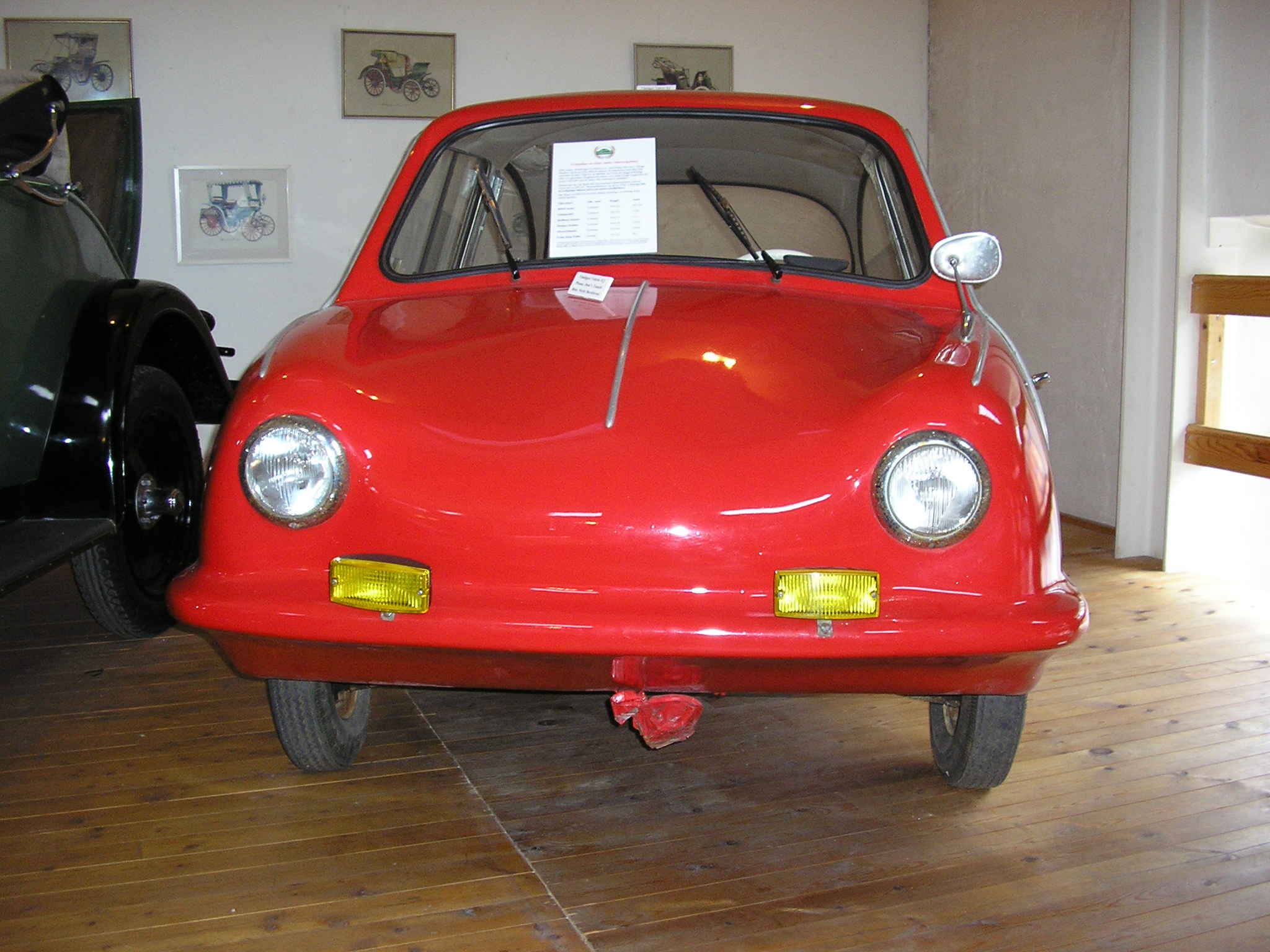
Fram King Fulda (1957)

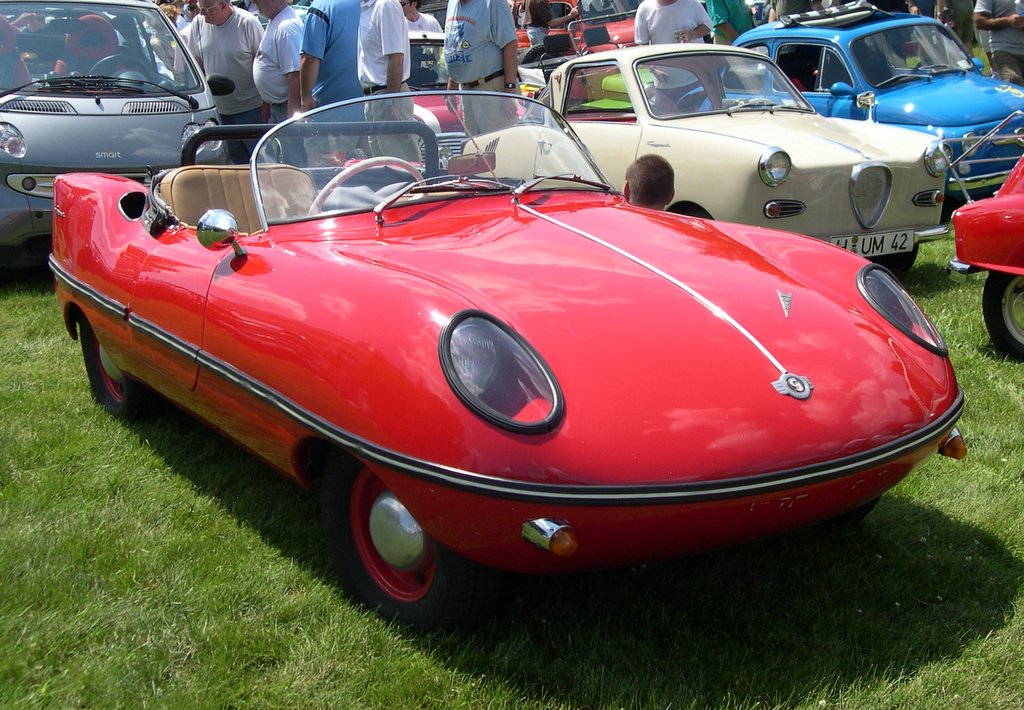
Goggomobil Dart

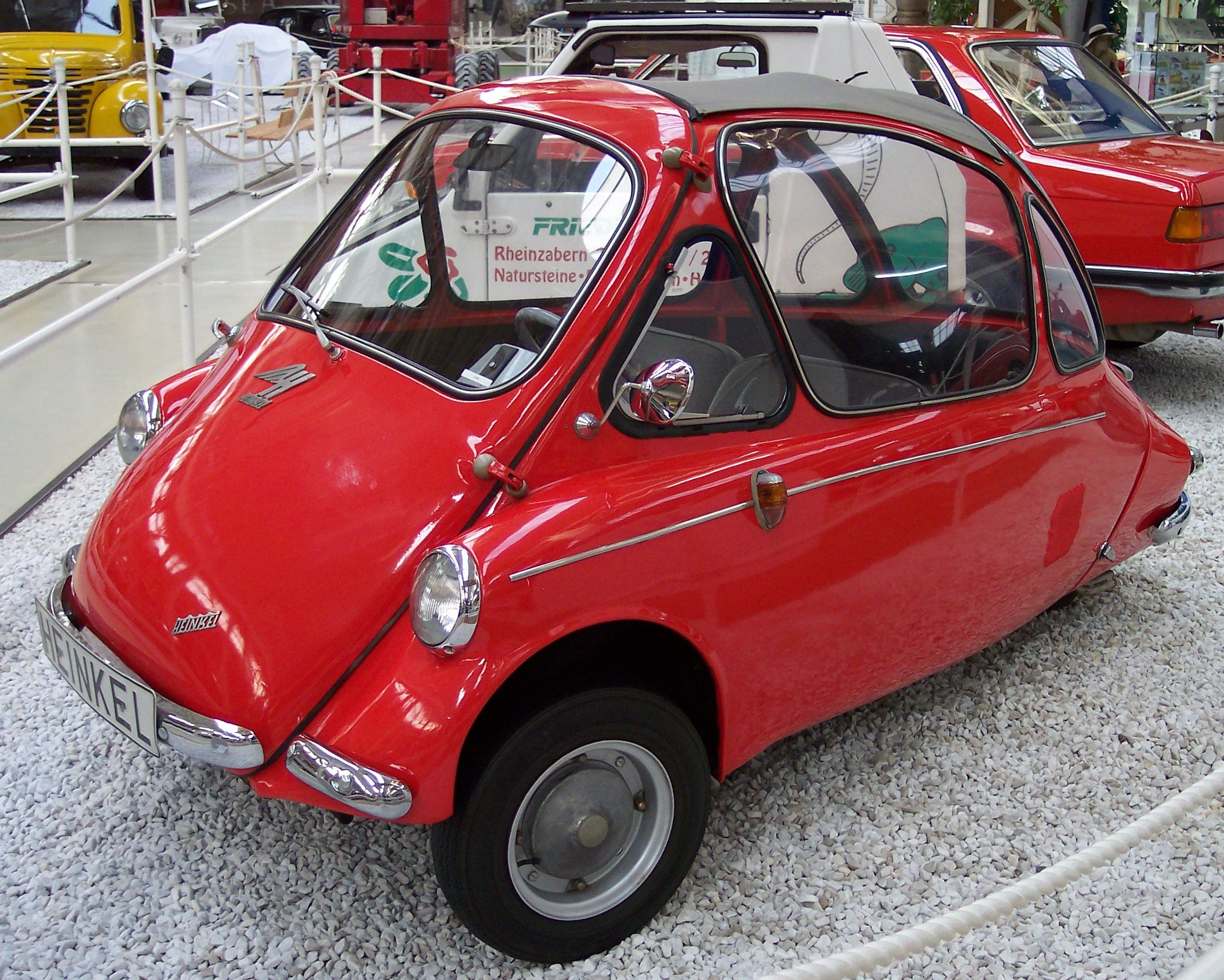
Heinkel Kabine

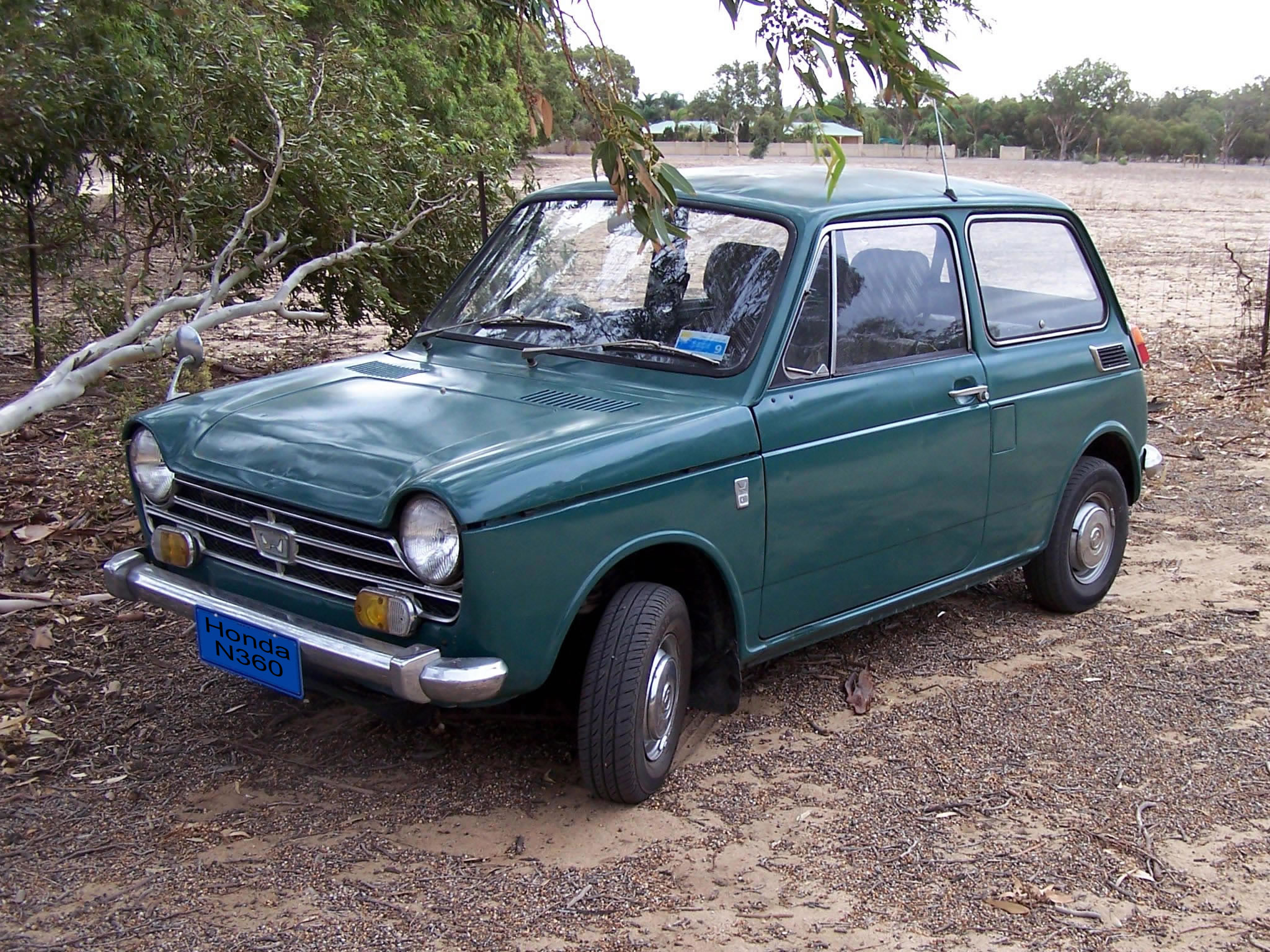
Honda N Sedan

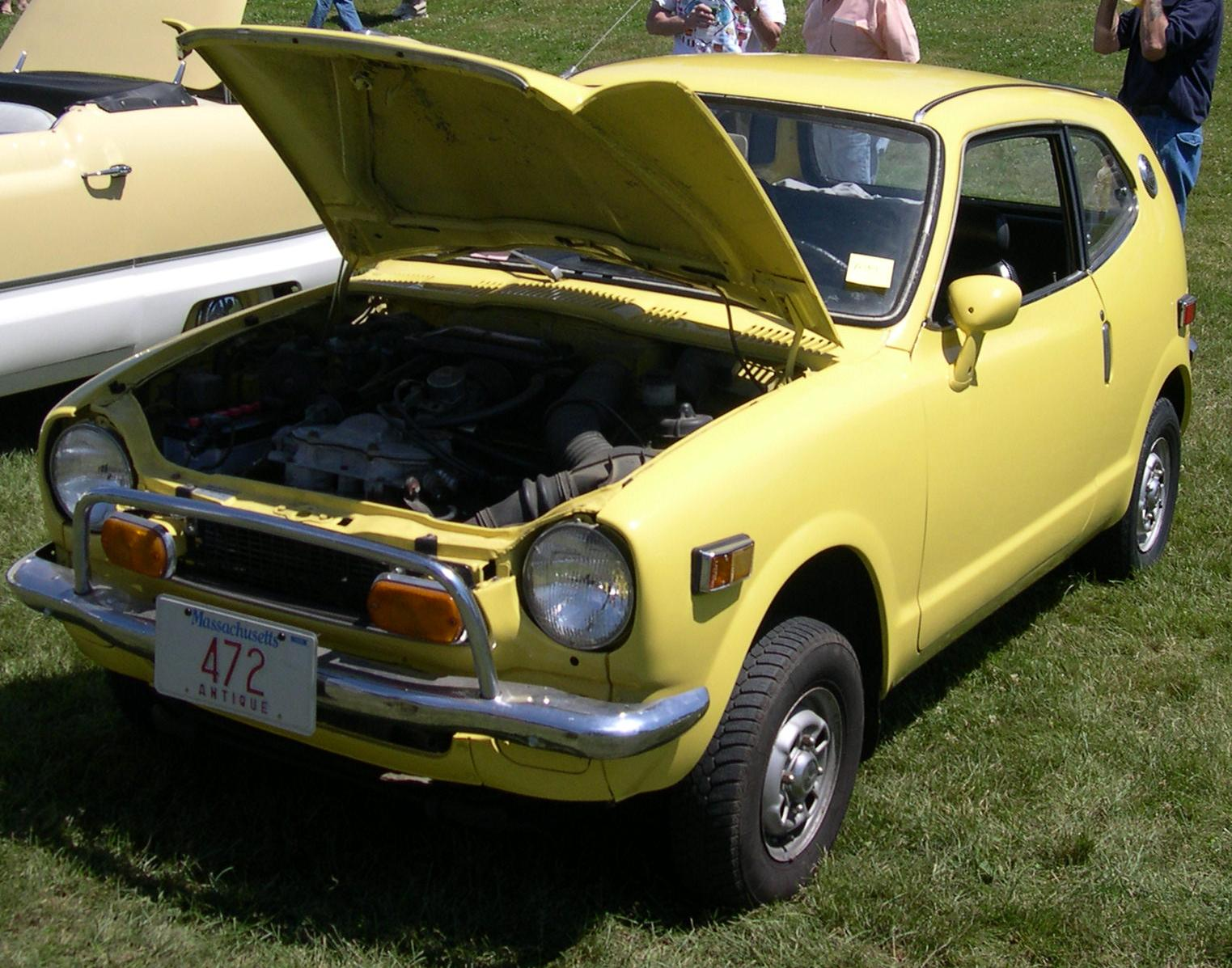
Honda Z Coupe

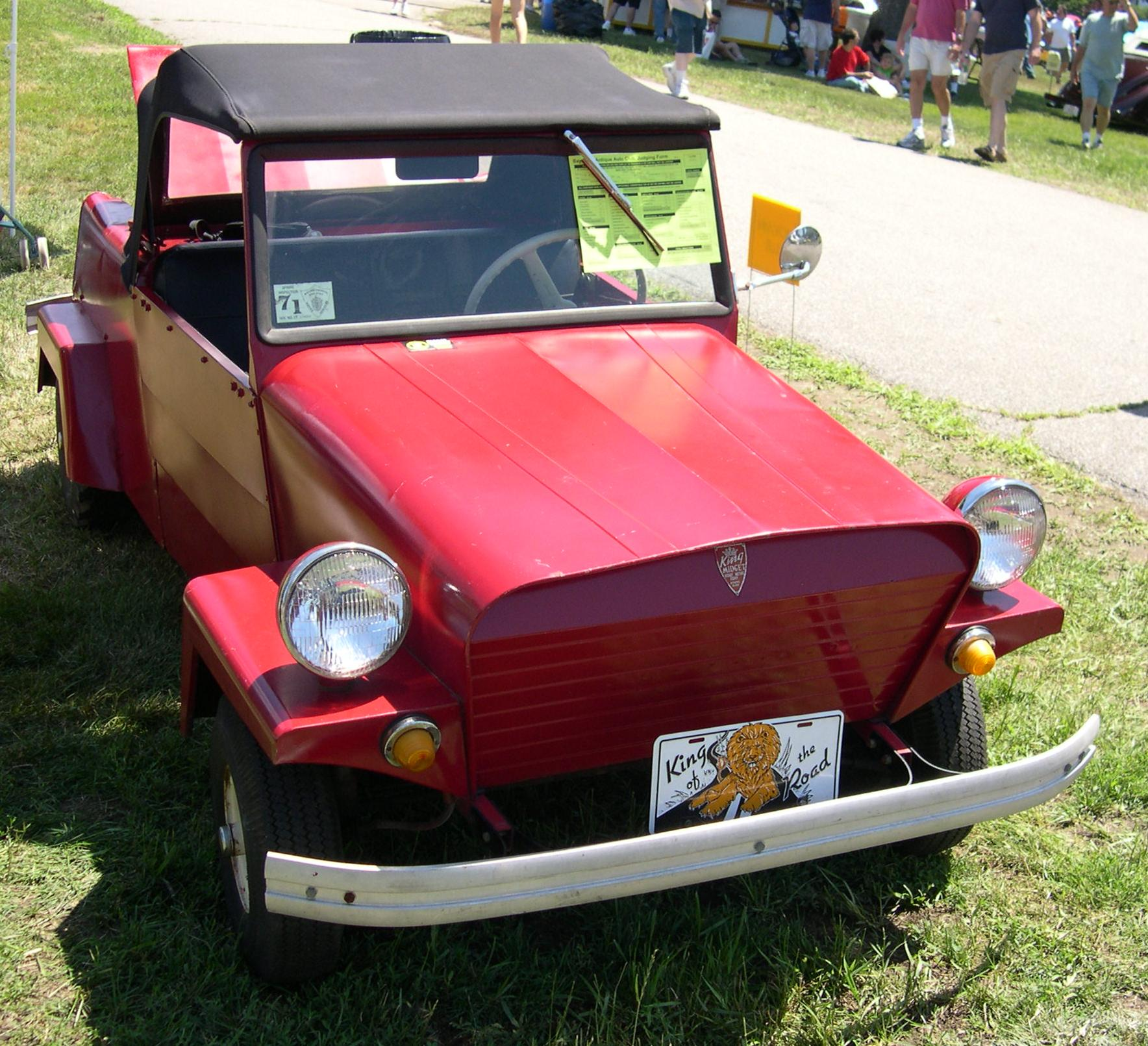
King Midget Model III

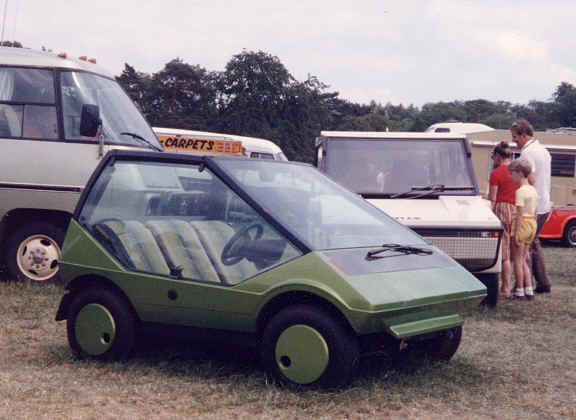
Mallalieu Microdot

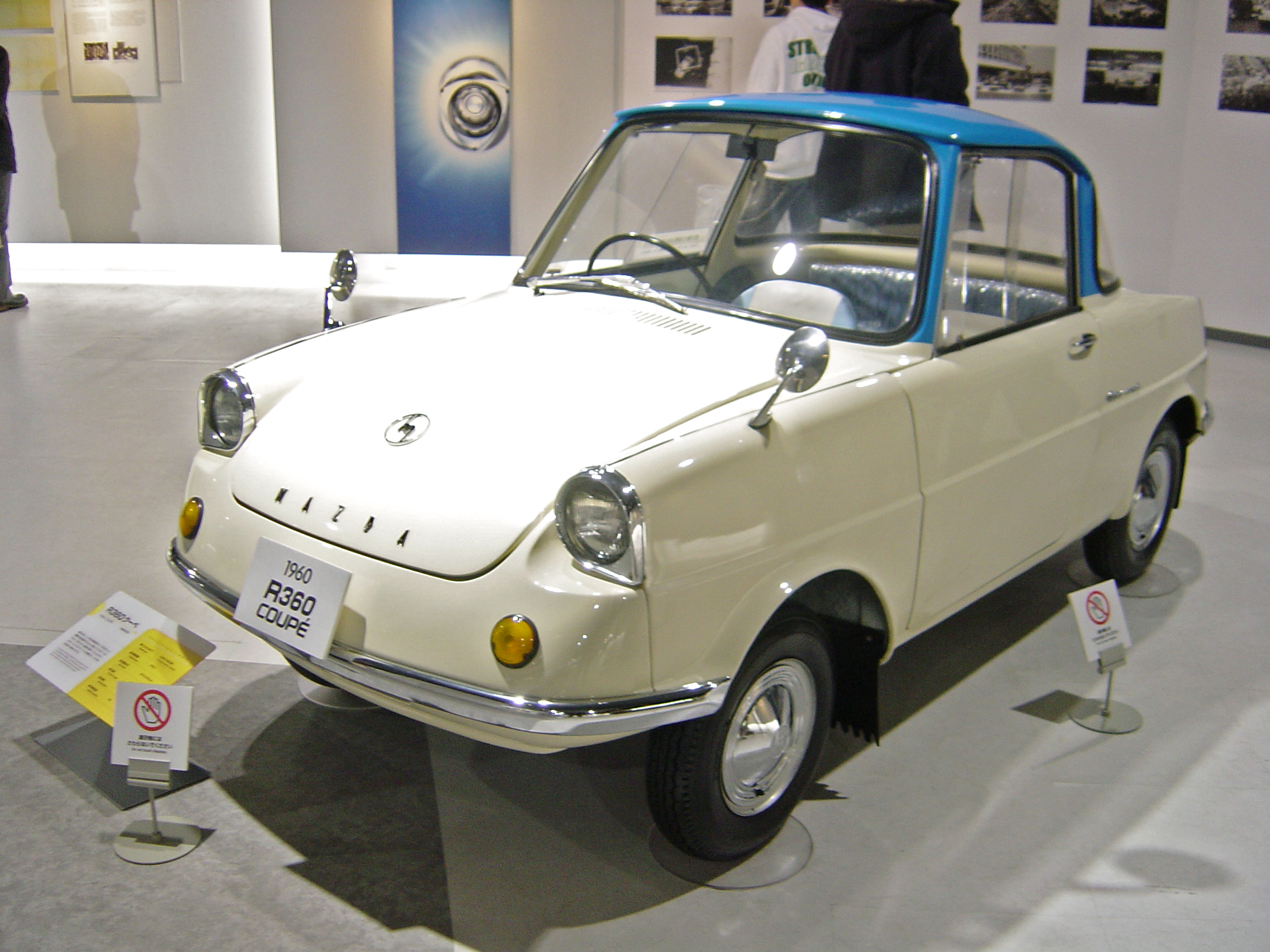
Mazda R360 coupe

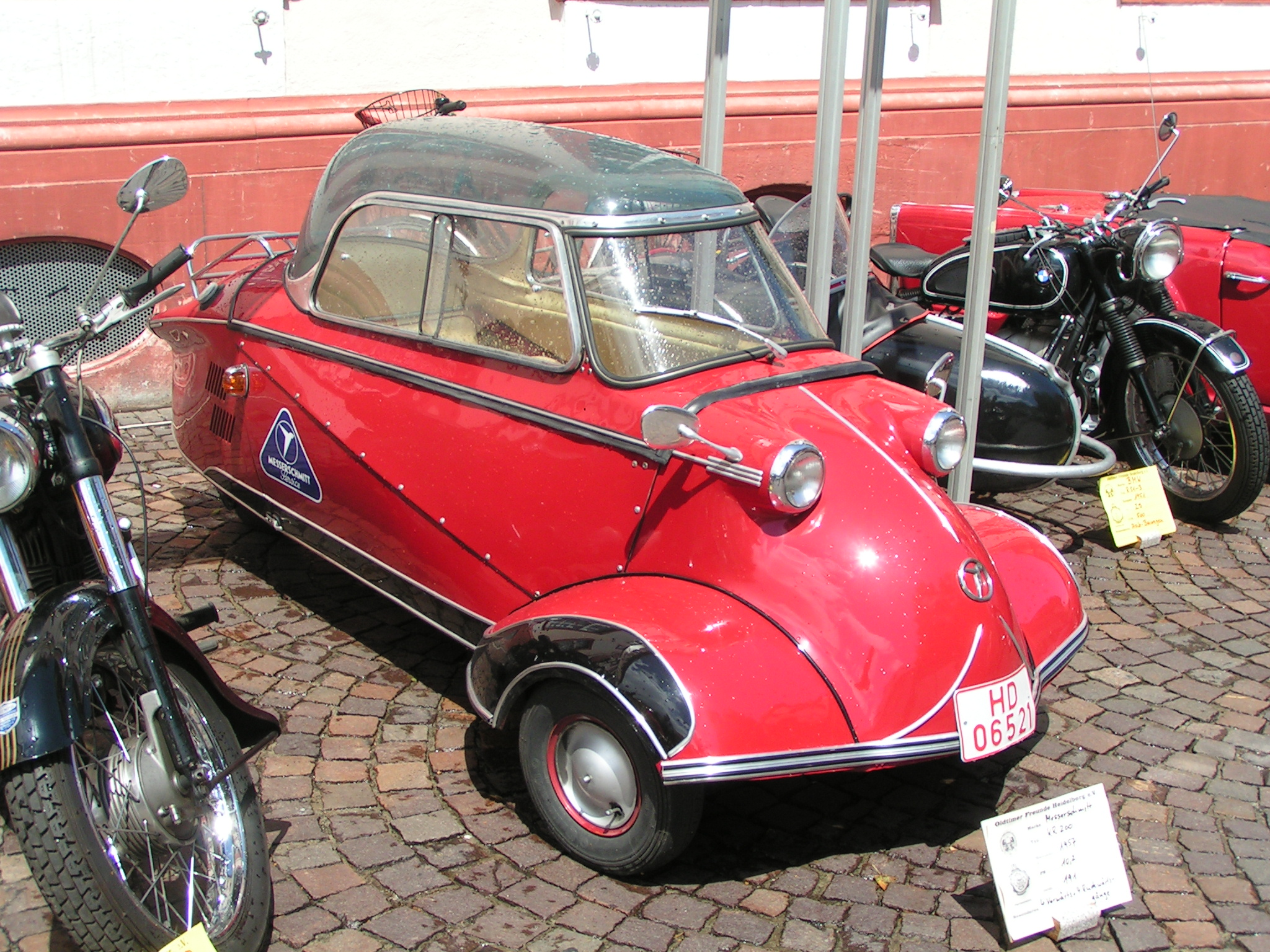
Messerschmitt Kabinenroller

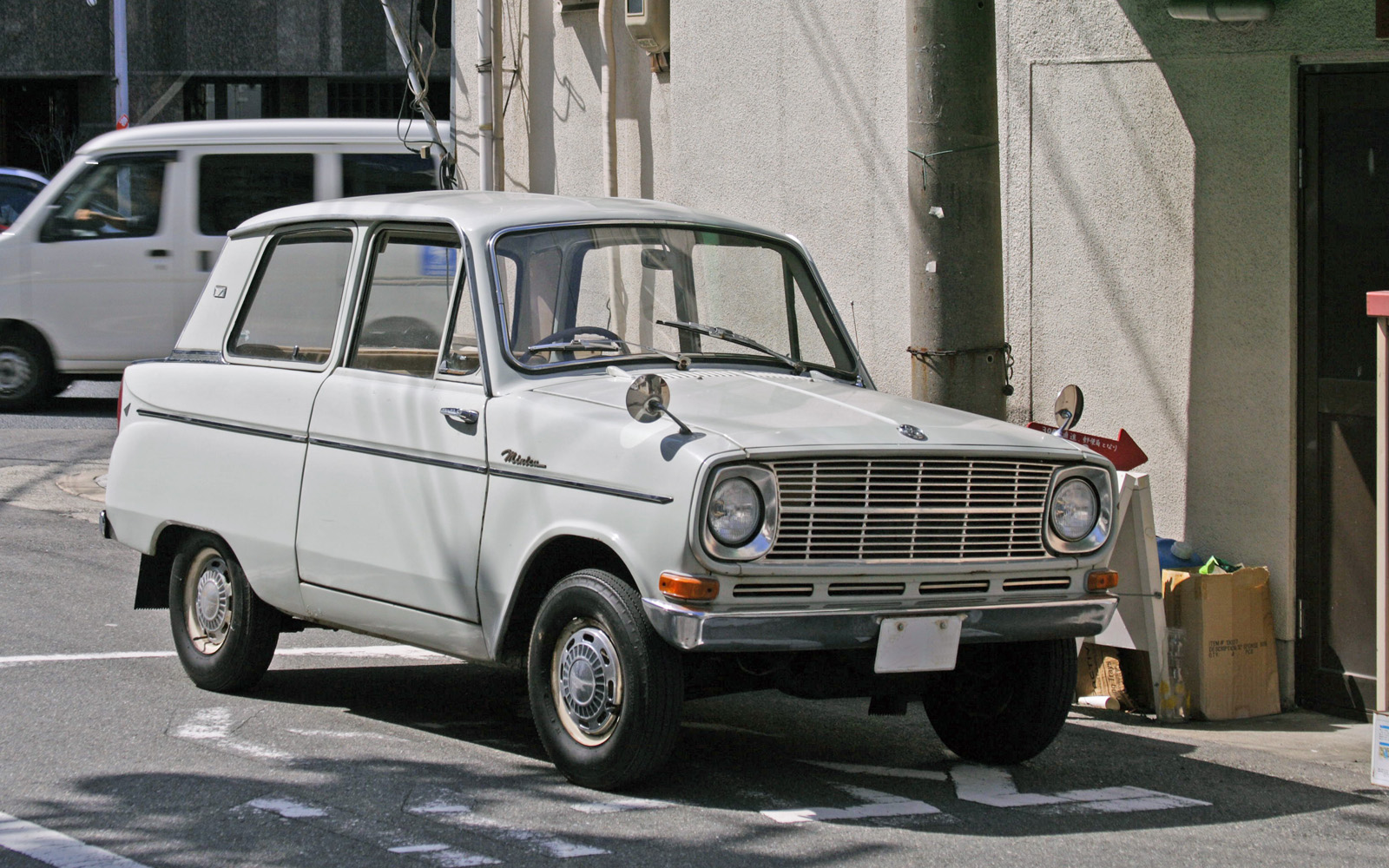
Mitsubishi Minica 1st Generation

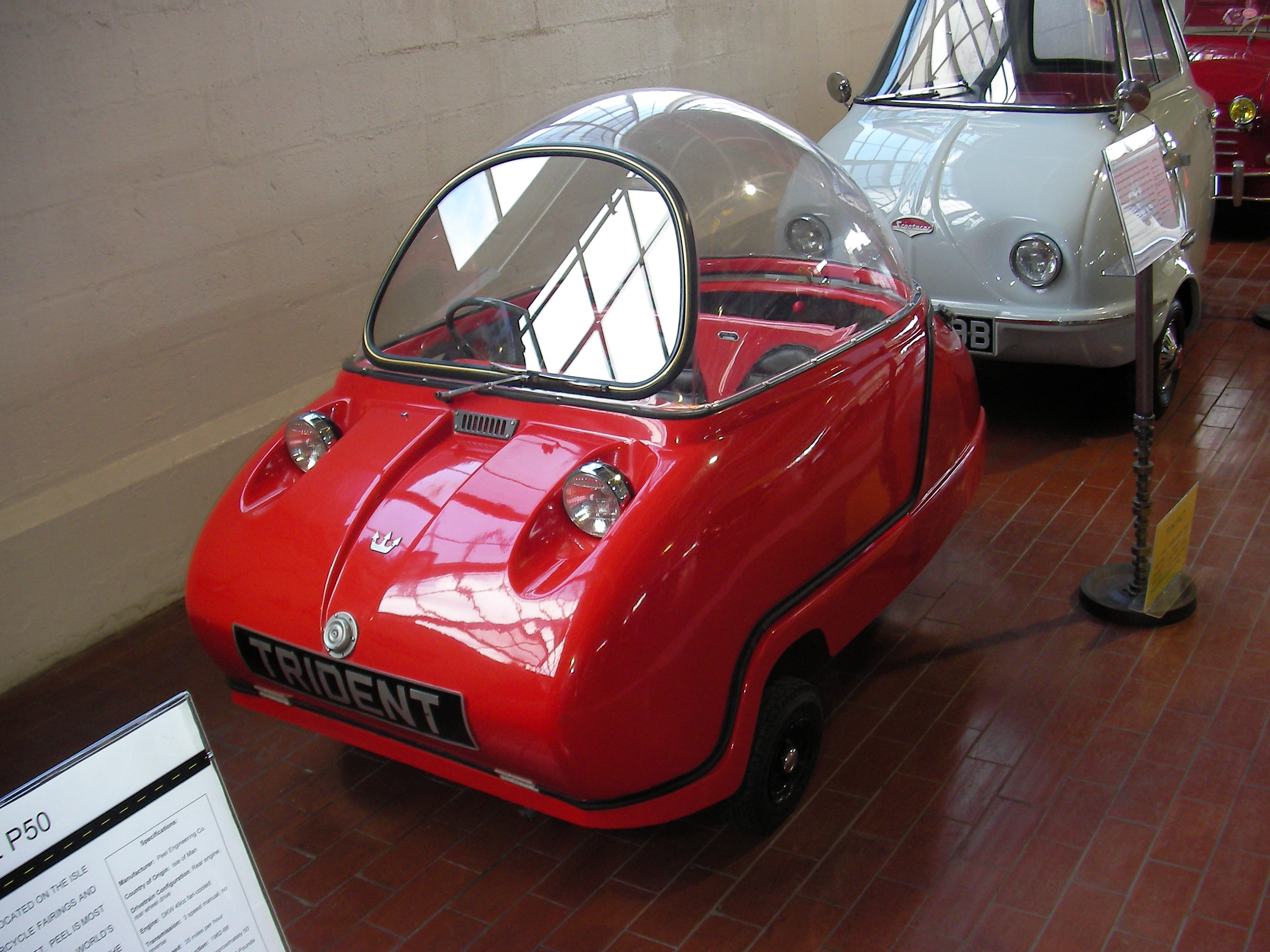
Peel Trident

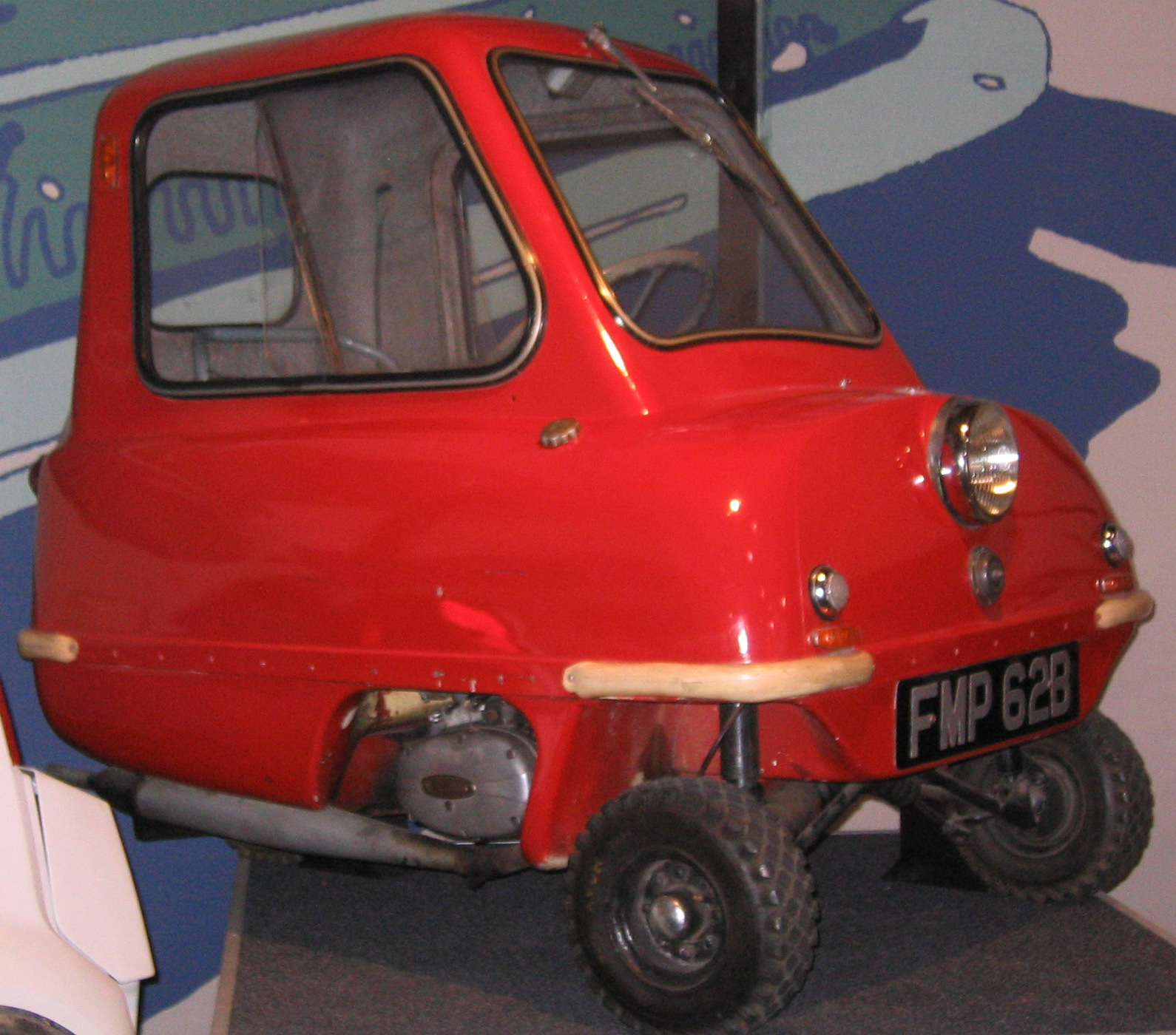
Peel P50

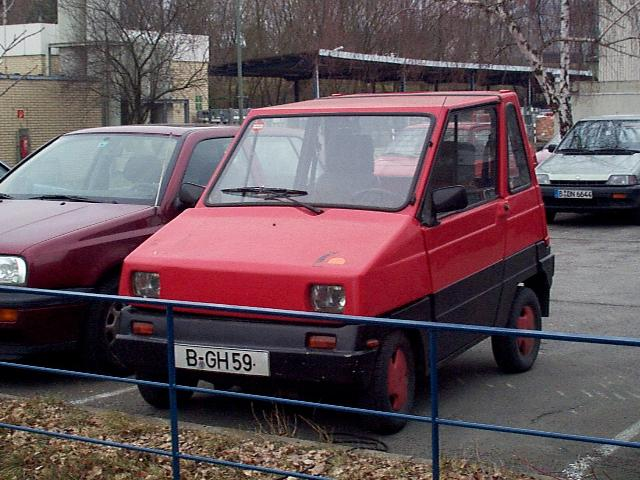
Puli

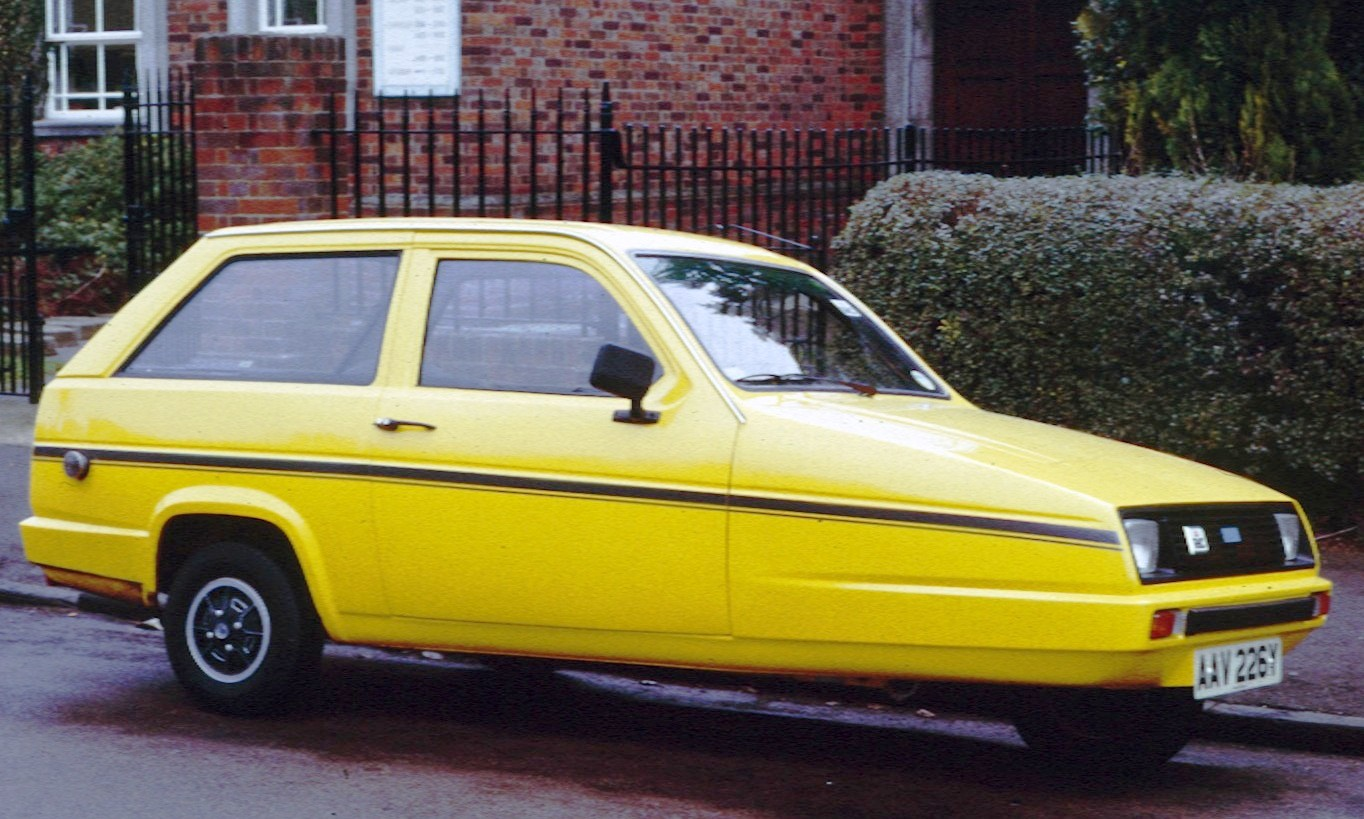
Reliant Rialto

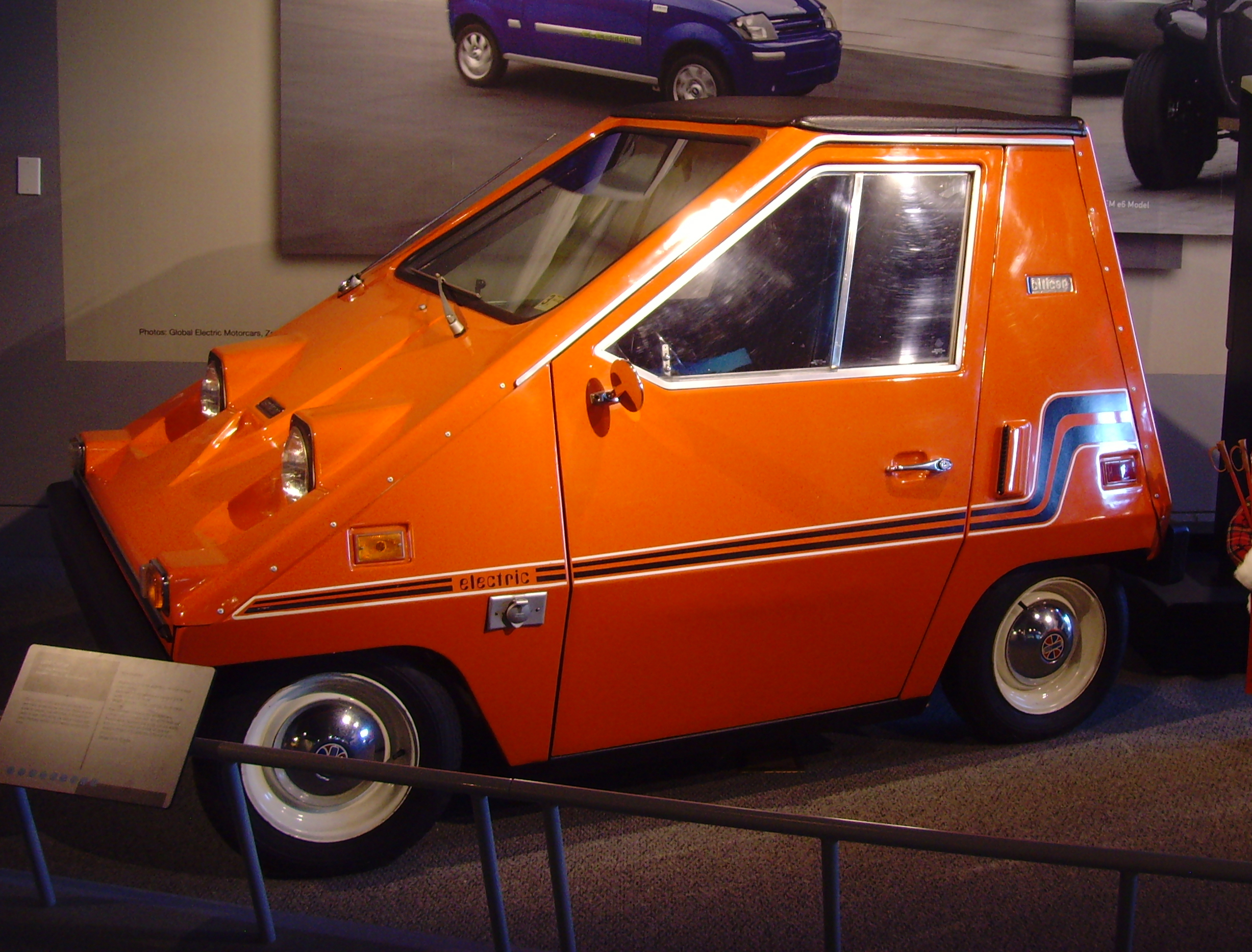
Sebring Vanguard Citicar

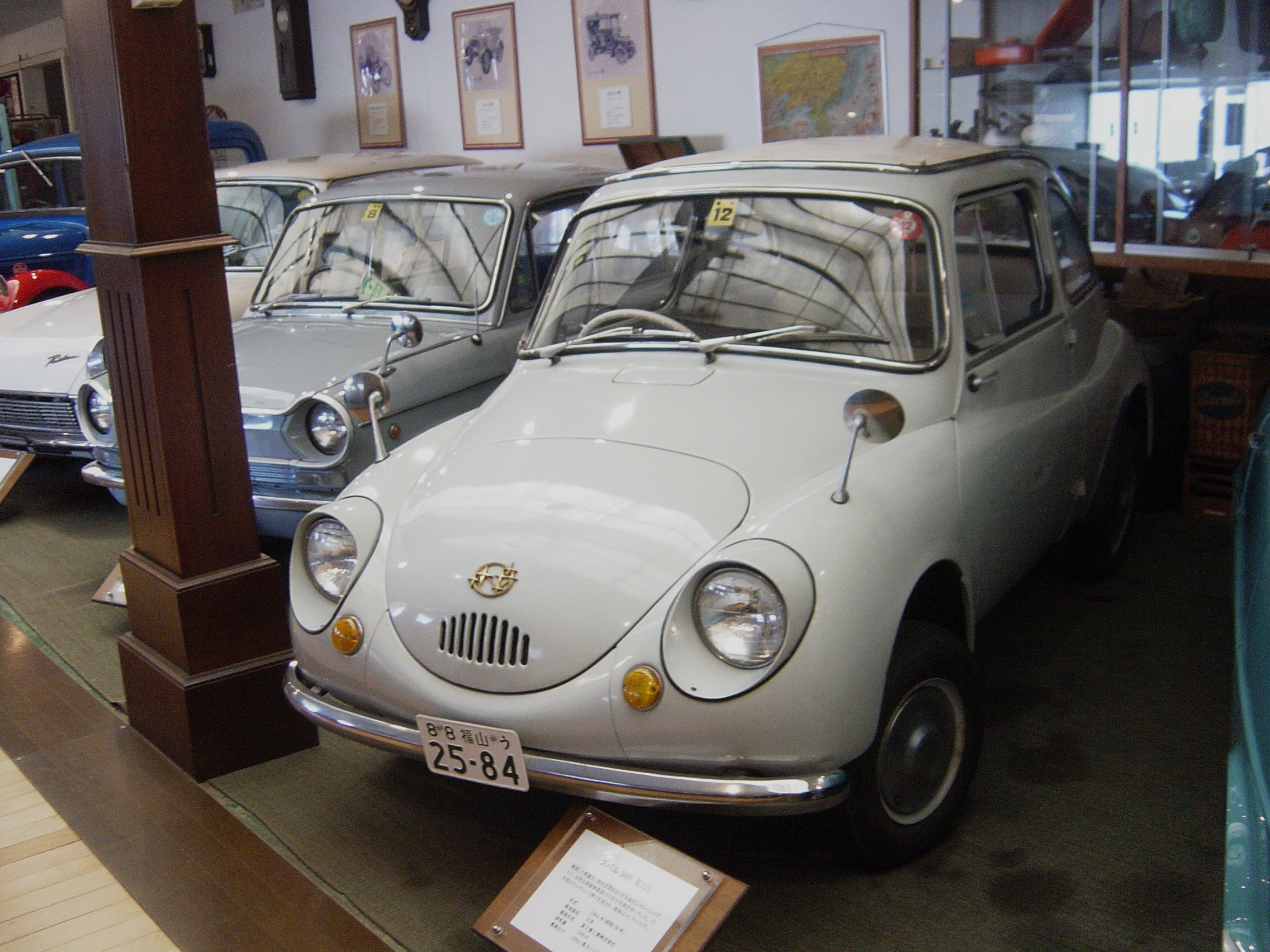
Subaru 360

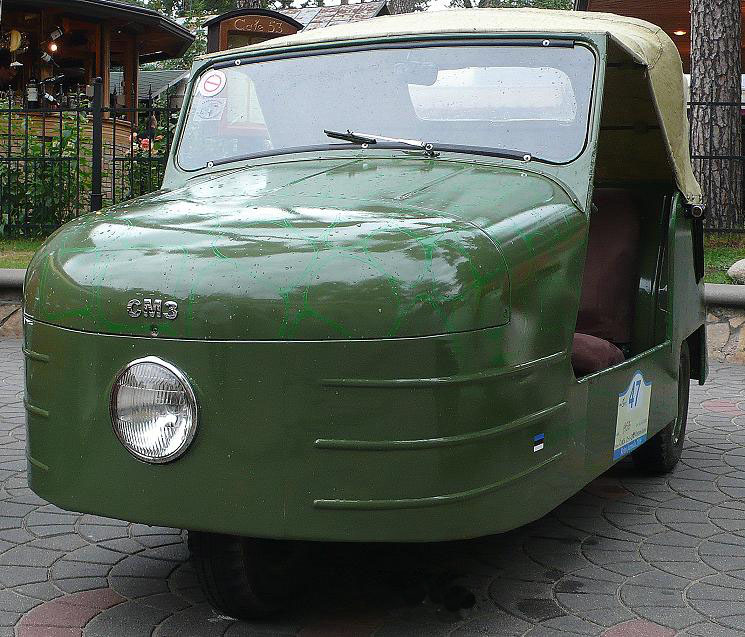
Soviet SMZ S-1L

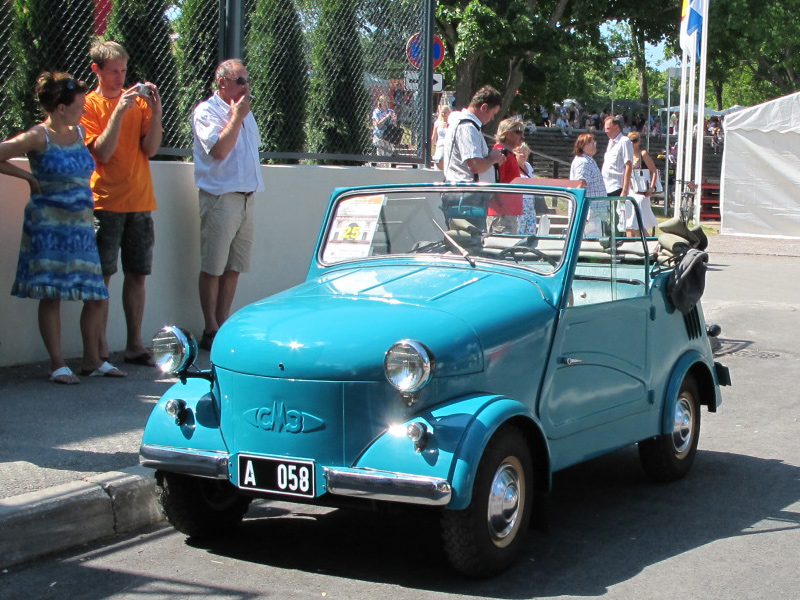
SMZ S-3A

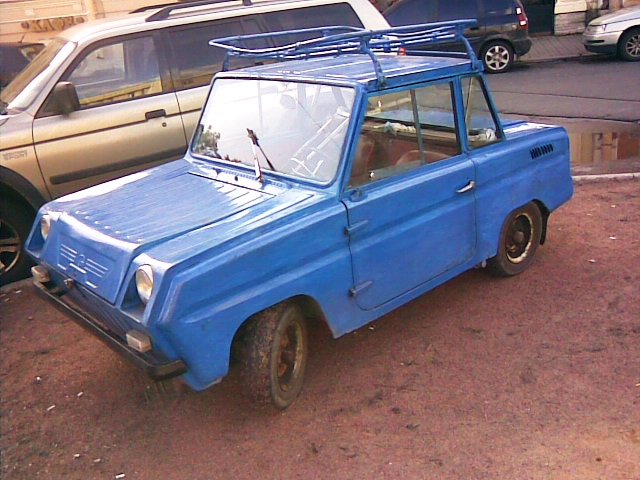
SMZ S-3D

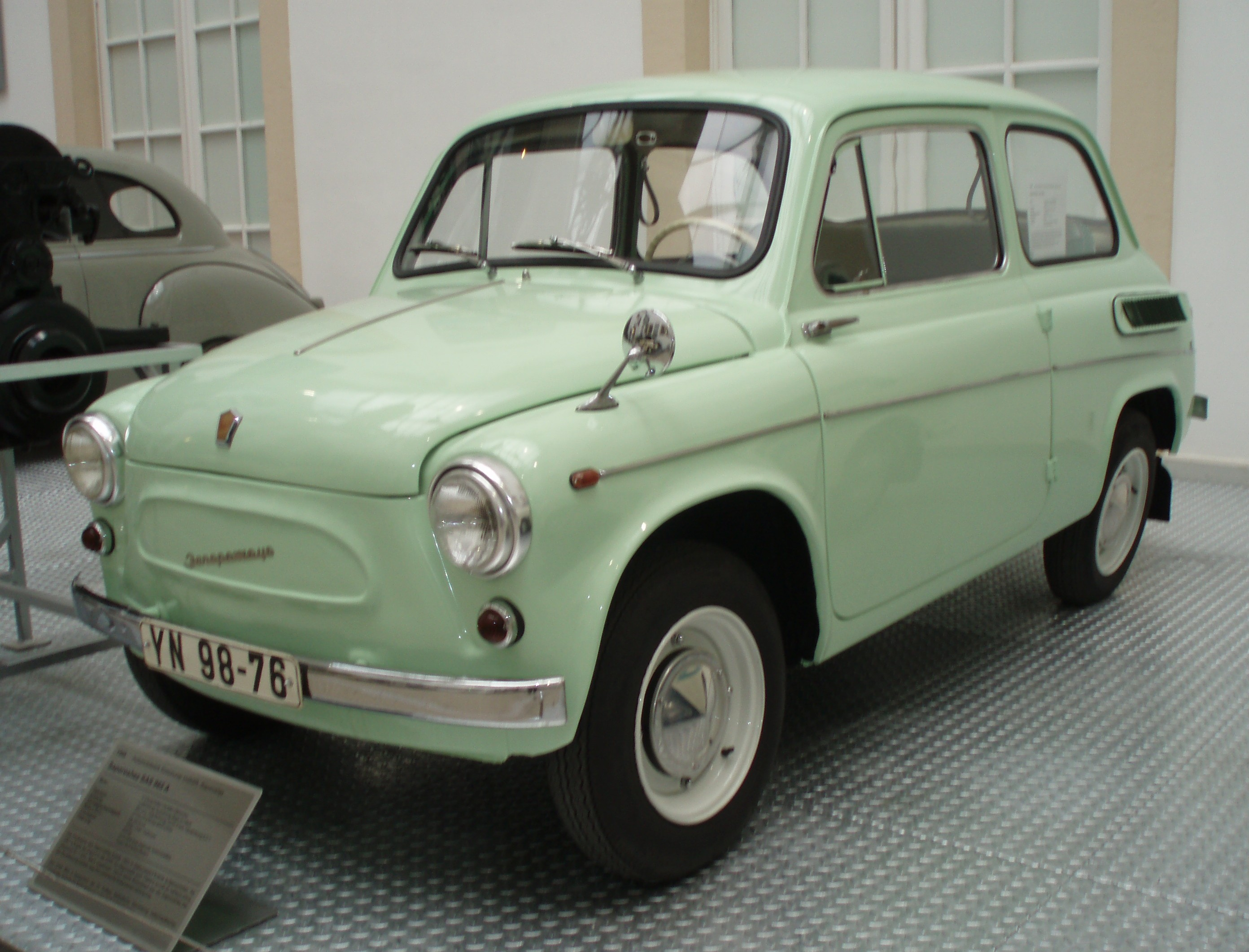
ZAZ-965

== See also ==
- Cyclecars by country of origin
- Kei car
