= Frederick Hart =

Frederick, Freddie or Fred Hart may refer to:

- Frederick Hart (politician) (1836–1915), member of the Queensland Legislative Council
- Frederick Hart (sculptor) (1943–1999), American sculptor
- Fred Hart (engineer) (1914–2008), British automotive engineer
- Fred J. Hart (businessman) (1888–1976), American farmer and businessman in the field of radionics
- Fred J. Hart (politician) (1908–1983), American businessman and politician in Illinois
- Freddie Hart (1926–2018), stage name of Frederick Segrest, American country musician and songwriter

== See also ==
- Frederick Hartt (1914–1991), professor of history of art
