= Fred Hart (engineer) =

British automotive engineer (1914–2008)

Frederick Leslie Hart
- Born: 12 September 1914
- Died: 16 July 2008 (aged 93)
- Occupation: Automotive engineer
- Known for: Ford Cortina

Frederick Leslie Hart (12 September 1914 – 16 July 2008) is best known as an automotive engineer for Ford in England. Initially working for the City of London, he joined Ford during World War II as a draughtsman and continued with Ford after the war to become chief engineer in 1963. In 1969 Hart moved to GKN Sankey to become technical director. He retired in 1979.

== Early years ==
Hart was educated in Walthamstow grammar school and undertook engineering classes at night school. Initially working for the city of London, he then became a landscape architect. In 1940 he joined Ford as part of the war effort to become a draughtsman and took part in the design of armoured vehicles. Hart married Margaret Lydia Bennett in 1943, and they had a son named John.

== Career ==
After the war, Hart continued with Ford where he became executive engineer of light cars in 1957, his first major project being the Ford Anglia in 1959. He played a major role in the development of the new Ford Cortina launched in 1962 and is credited with specifically developing the successful "aeroflow" ventilation system. He was promoted to chief engineer in 1963 and was involved with the Ford Corsair and the 1966 Zephyr and Zodiac.

In 1969 Hart left Ford to join GKN Sankey in Telford as their technical director and to develop a car specifically for drivers who used wheelchairs, originally known as the Minissima and later as the Elswick Envoy. The project won a Design Council commendation in 1978 but was too expensive for government support and was cancelled. GKN sold the rights to Elswick, and a small number were built and sold as the Envoy.
