= Microdot (car) =

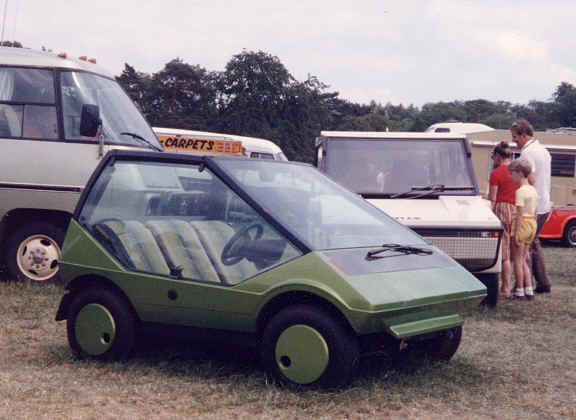
- 1976 Microdot

Overview
- Type: Concept car
- Production: 1976; 1 built
- Designer: William Towns

Body and chassis
- Related: Austin Mini

Dimensions
- Length: 6 ft 8 in (2.03 m)
- Curb weight: 1,008 lb (457 kg)

Chronology
- Predecessor: Minissima

The Microdot is a concept vehicle by William Towns for a small, economical town car. The car was first shown at the 1976 British International Motor Show and was an evolution of his 1972 Minissima car. The Microdot was a petrol/electric hybrid vehicle with a small 400cc petrol engine powering a 3.5 kW generator and, designed to carry three people side-by-side on short city journeys, with the driver sitting in the central position.

The concept car was eventually purchased by the Heritage Motor Centre.

== Mallalieu Engineering ==
In 1978 William Towns collaborated with prototype vehicle builders at Mallalieu Engineering, Wootton, Abingdon, Oxfordshire, with a view to limited production. The Microdot prototype, built on a cut-down Austin Mini chassis, was given opening doors and a 6-inch (150 mm) longer nose, to accommodate the aluminium Reliant car engine, one of the smallest and lightest UK car engines then available, instead of the original hybrid proposal. Mallalieu Engineering was best known for making Bentley Specials, the Barchetta and Oxford, based on the Mark 6 Bentley.

Mallalieu attempted to gain external funding from the Post Office pension fund, but this was not forthcoming due to concerns raised with the Government's scientific advisor who attended the meetings, and the project stalled in 1980. Mallalieu Microdot (company number 01504509) was dissolved on 23 June 1987 and the project disappeared.

== Design ==
Designers from film special-effects studios in London, who had created the original Star Wars spaceship interiors, created "alive" interior cockpit designs and motor industry experts from Lucas and Ever Ready advised on batteries, power-trains and instruments. Relying on 8-track stereo tape recordings by celebrities, it was planned that a Microdot would "talk" to its owner.

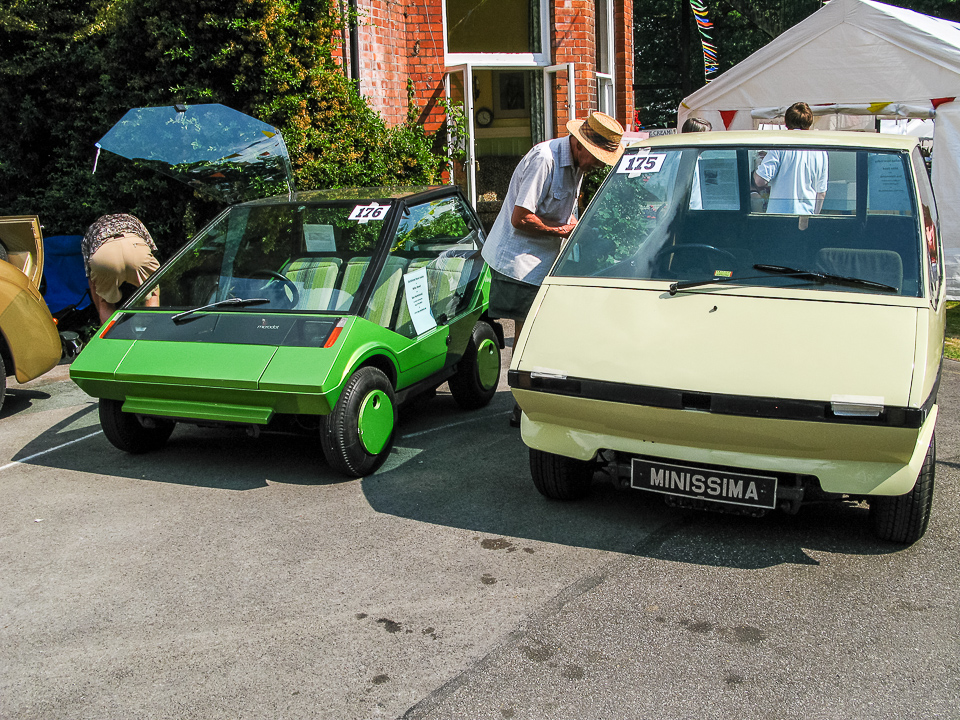
Together with the Minissima

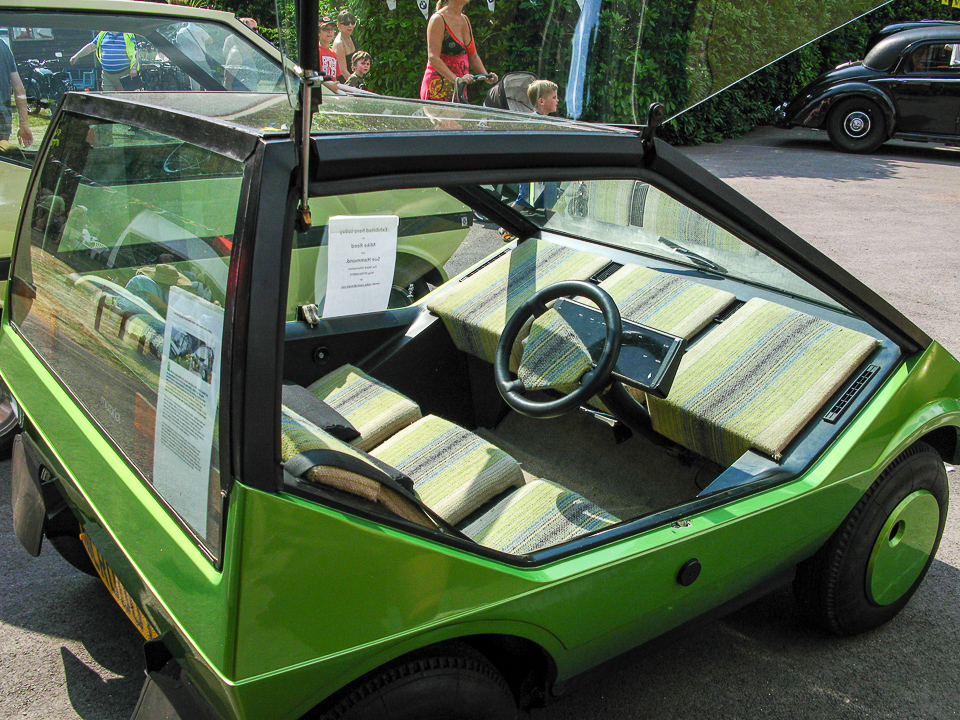
Interior

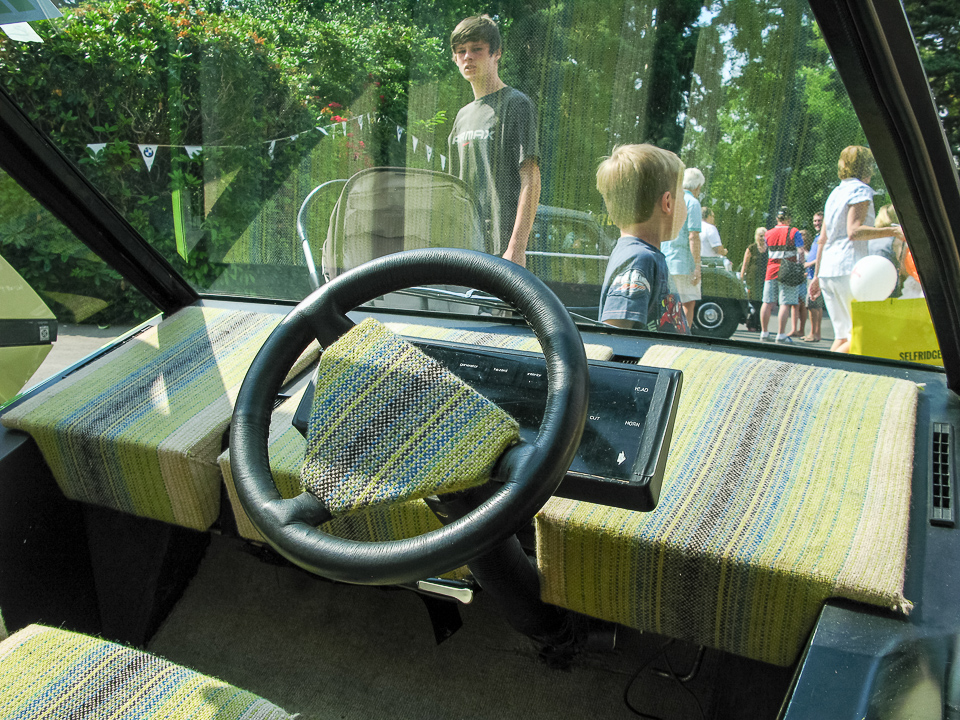
Dashboard
