= Minissima =

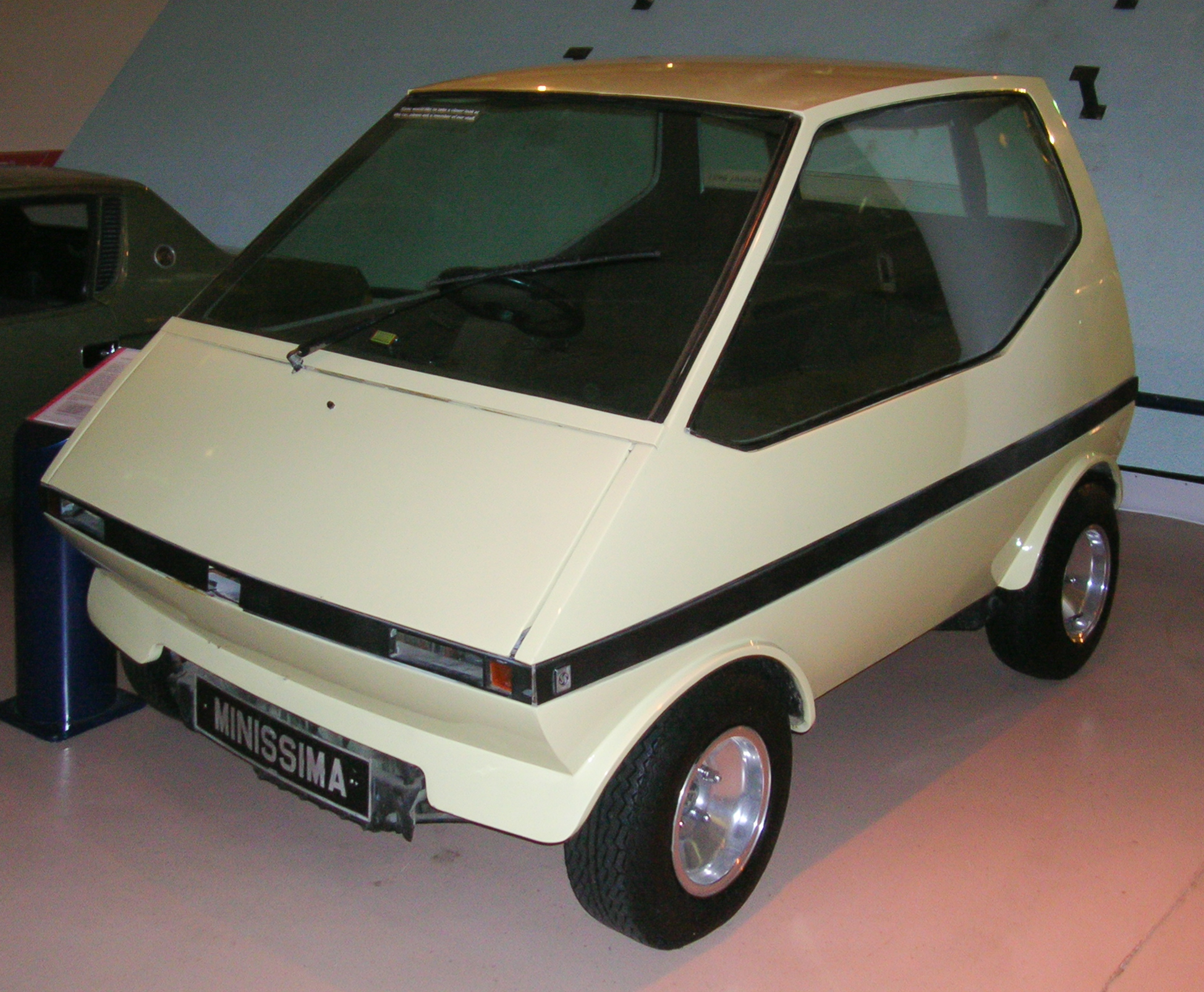
- 1972 Minissima

Overview
- Also called: Elswick Envoy
- Production: 1972
- Designer: William Towns

Chronology
- Successor: Microdot , Elswick Envoy

The Minissima is a small concept city car that was designed by William Towns (as the Townscar) as his idea for a replacement for the original Mini in 1972. It was displayed by British Leyland on their stand at the 1973 London Motor Show after they bought the prototype from Towns.

In common with the early Mini, it was designed around its initial 10" wheels and the BMC A-Series engine. It is 30 in (76 cm) shorter than the Mini and designed to park end-on to the curb (like the Smart Fortwo), having only one door - at the rear. It has four seats, two at the front, front facing, and two facing inwards at the rear.

The Minissima design re-emerged a few years later as a prototype car for the disabled, adapted by engineering firm GKN Sankey by ex Ford engineer Fred Hart. During the engineering process, the layout changed to feature a central driving position in which a wheelchair user would enter through the back door using a fold-down rear ramp, and drive off. The styling was simplified by William Towns to suit mass production and won a Design Council award in 1978, it did not gain government support due to high costs and the project was cancelled.

GKN sold the rights to British bicycle manufacturer Elswick, and a small number were manufactured from 1981 to 1987 and were sold as the Elswick Envoy. In 2007, an Elswick Envoy was the subject of a 24-minute short film, Elegy for the Elswick Envoy, which shared the prize for best documentary in the 2008 Aspen Shortsfest film festival.

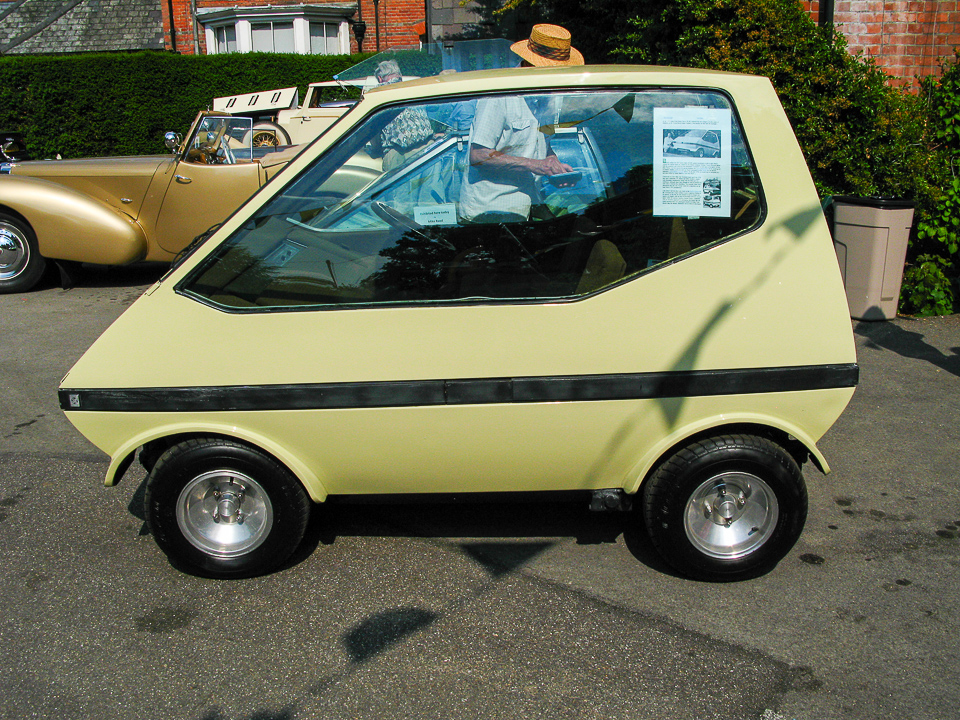
Side view

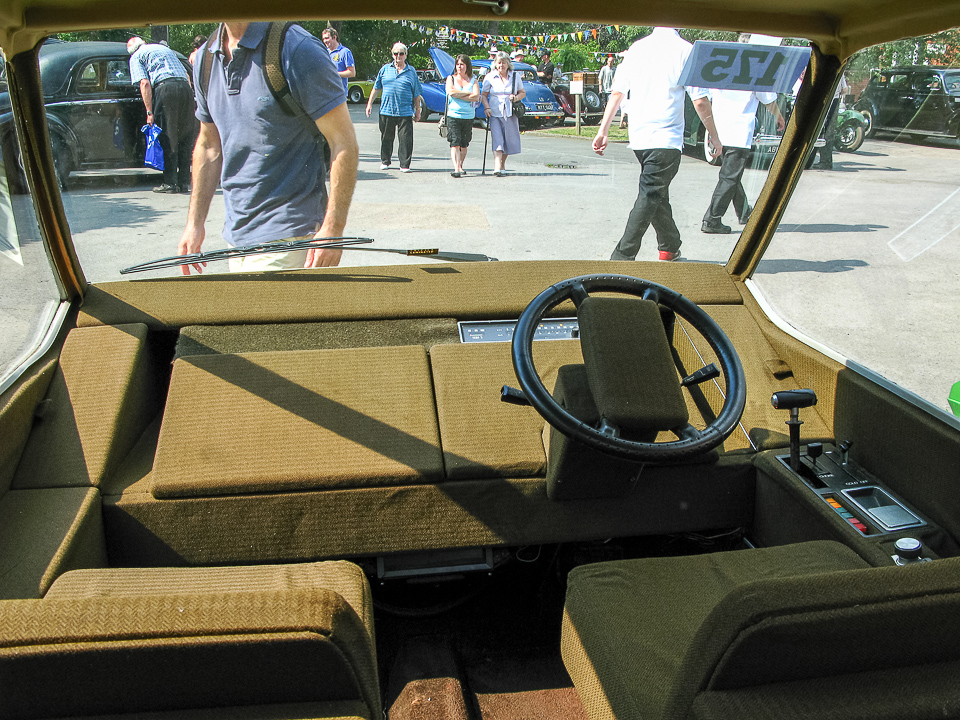
Dashboard

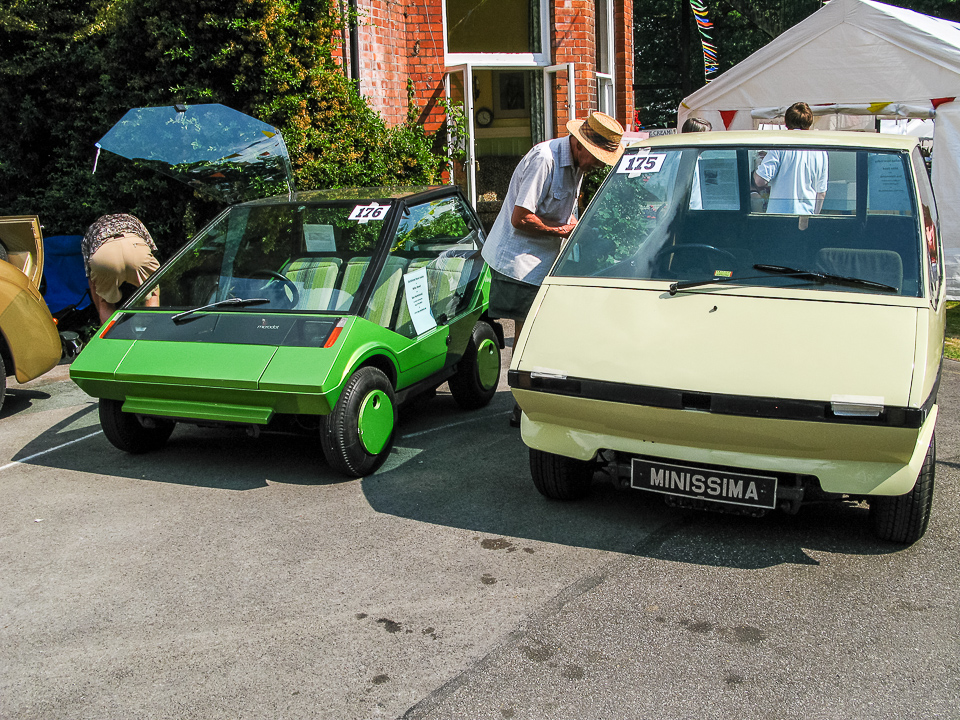
Together with Microdot
