= Aston Martin V8 (disambiguation) =

Aston Martin V8 generally refers to the 1969 to 1990 DBS-based Aston Martin V8 model. However the name has been used by Aston Martin for a number of other vehicles, as well as the engine used in some of these vehicles. The following is a list of all Aston Martin V8 road cars, and a V8 engine made by Aston Martin:

- 1969–1990 V8
- 1976–1989 V8 Lagonda
- 1977–1989 V8 Vantage
- 1988–2000 V8 Virage
- 1993–1999 V8 Vantage
- 2005–2017 V8 Vantage
- 1969–2000 Aston Martin V8 engine
