= Hustler (car) =

Kit car designed by William Towns in 1978

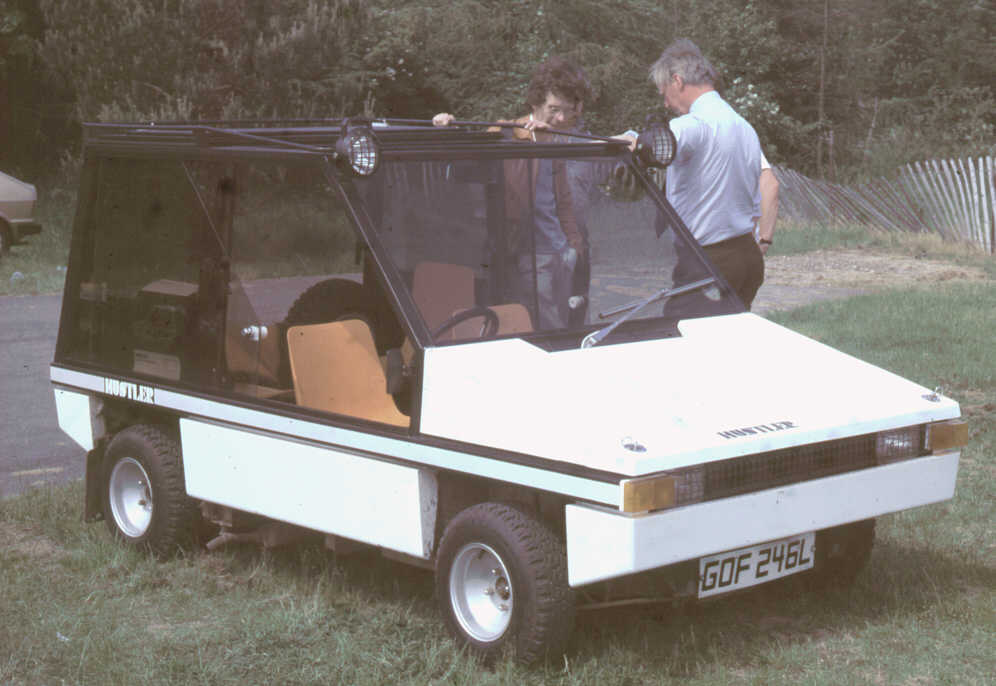
1979 Hustler. William Towns is behind the car, facing the camera.

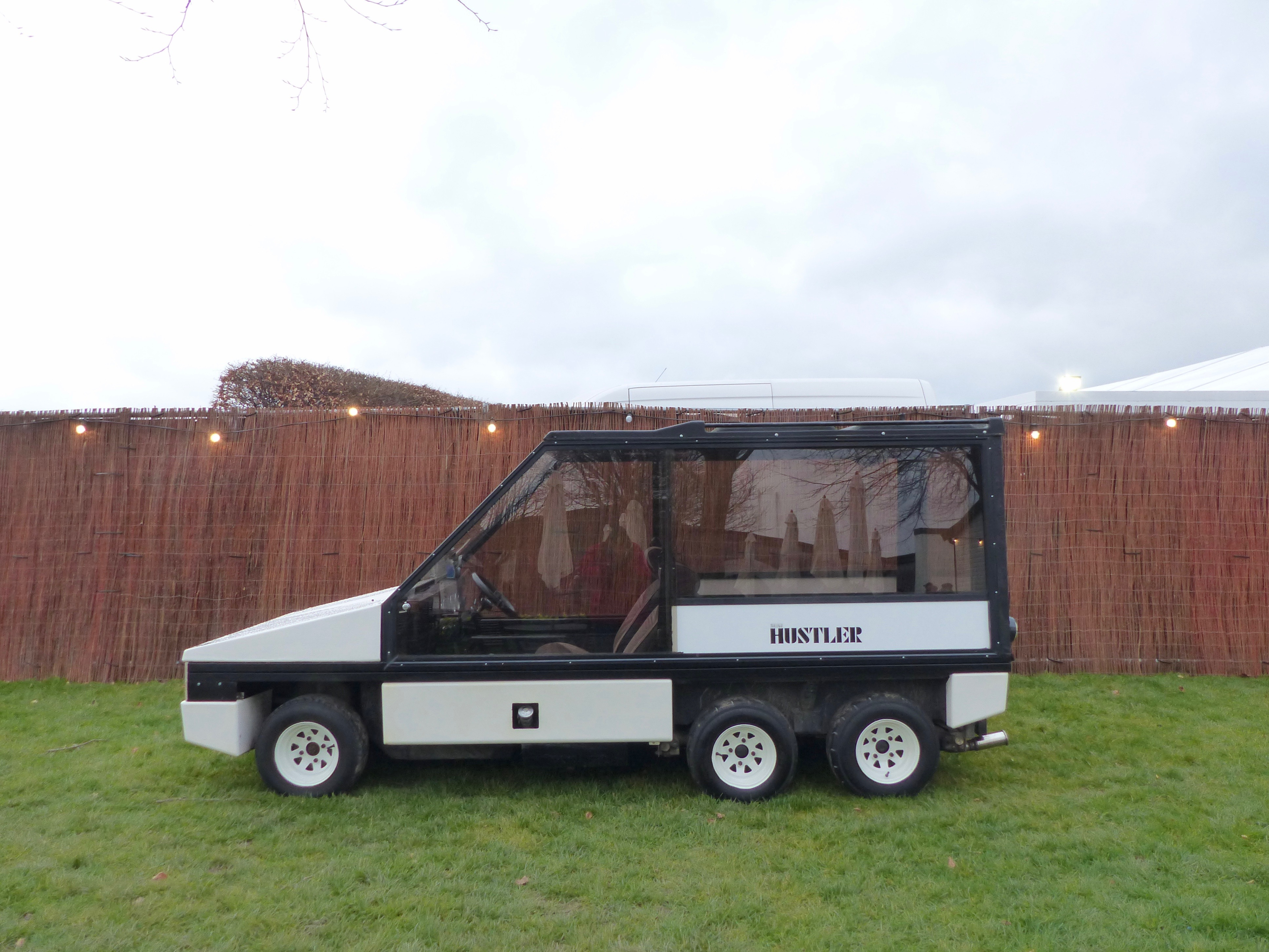
Hustler 6

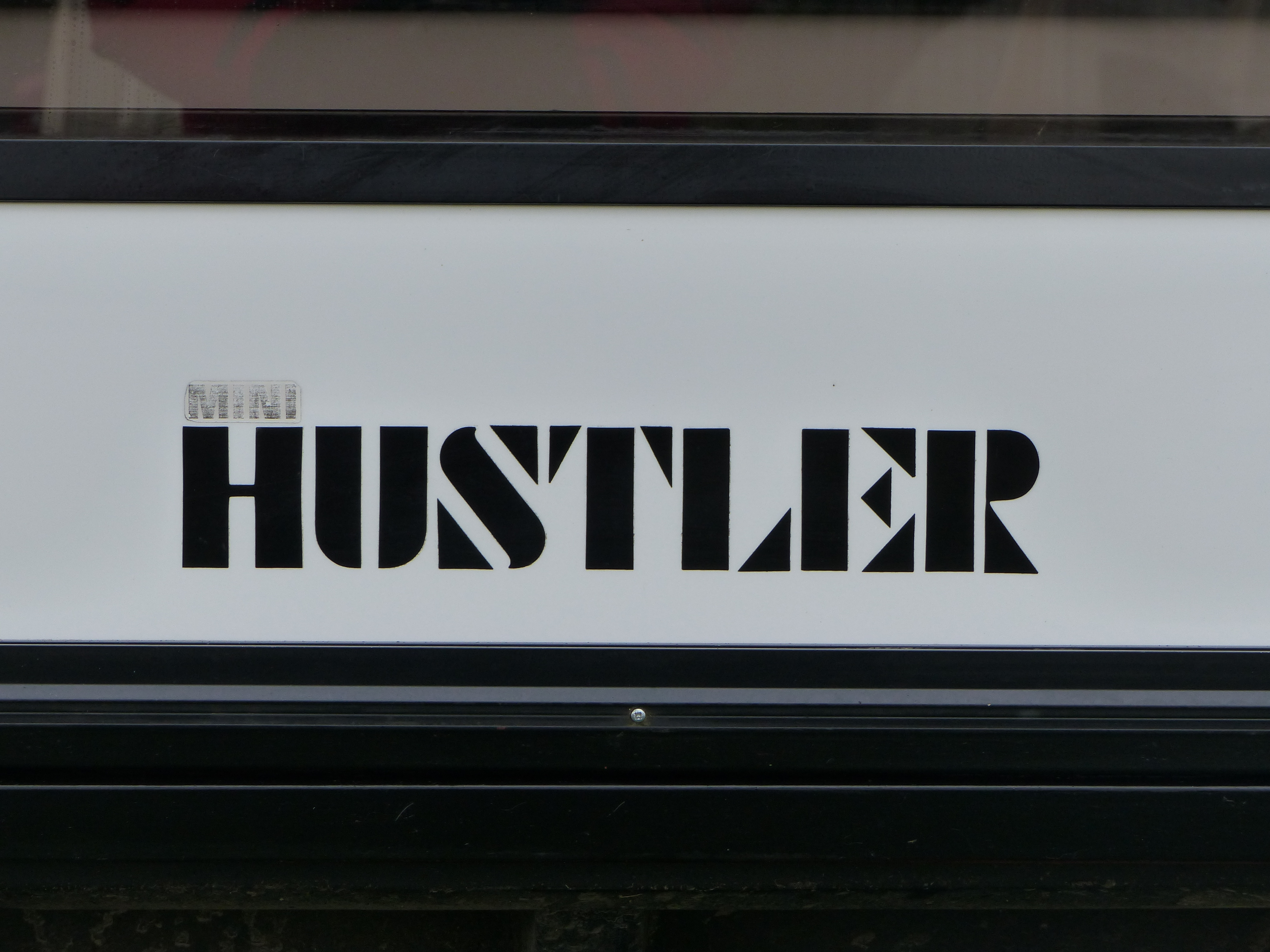
Hustler logotype

The Hustler was a Mini-based project designed in 1978 by Aston Martin Lagonda designer William Towns and later developed into a kit car by his Interstyl design studio.

The original version used upper and lower square-section steel frames, clad with glass fibre panels and large flat glass windows. On most models sliding side windows acted as doors. It used the front and rear sub frames and mechanical components from the British Leyland Mini, Metro or BMC1100/1300. The Hustler came in four and six wheel versions: the six wheel version used two Mini rear sub frame assemblies. The style was very much off-road/utility in the rectilinear idiom of the Lagonda and Bulldog.

At the 1981 Earl's Court Motor Show, a wooden version was introduced, using marine plywood and solid wood as both structure and body. Shortly afterwards, a sportier version was also introduced, using the same lower steel structure but with an upper structure with less height. An open-topped version, the Sport, was introduced at about the same time. The vehicle kits were sold directly from William Towns' home at Stretton-on-Fosse, near Moreton-in-Marsh, Gloucestershire, where his design studio was based.

The actual number made either by Interstyl themselves or by builders using plans and supplied kits remains unclear. Wikipedia originally posited in April 2018 that about 500 were made but left this figure needing citation. 'Honest John' reports that 280 were supplied as kits which suggests a total including Interstyl own builds and demonstrators of some 300. Aronlne confirms 200 kits, Bonham's state 300 Hustlers in total of which 8 were Highlanders, Classic.Retro.Modern confirm Bonham's 300 number whilst JB Restorations say that only 75 six wheelers were ever built. 102 Hustlers have been pictured in the press or on the web since 1978. Even adding in the Vendavan variant built on the 6 wheel chassis it's unlikely that more than 300 ever came into being (hustler-registry.org)

Hustler 4 : BL Mini-based original model.

Hustler 6
Used two Mini rear subframes to give four rear wheels.
Hustler Huntsman
Larger and more powerful BL 1100/1300 or Metro based model. 4 or 6 wheel versions.
Hustler Hellcat
Stripped down Mini-based jeep version. Usually 4-wheeled but 6-wheel version available.
Hustler Sport
Two-seat Mini-based drophead.
Hustler Sprint
Two-seat Mini-based coupe.
The Hustler in Wood
Designed to be built from plans in marine ply with a supplied alloy-framed glasshouse.
Hustler Holiday
One-box MPV version. 4- or 6-wheel versions.
Hustler Force
Conventional, full-depth doors instead of sliding glass. 4- or 6-wheel versions.
Hustler Highlander
One-off imposing 6-wheeled Jaguar V12-powered luxury version.
Hustler Harrier
High-roof version designed to take a wheelchair in the back.
Hustler Rag Top
Canvas roof version. 4 wheeled Mini sub frame. Similar to Hellcat. Only one ever produced. Now in France.
