= Towns (disambiguation) =

Towns are settlements that are generally larger than villages but smaller than cities.

Towns may also refer to:

== People ==
- Charles B. Towns (1862–1947) American writer
- Colin Towns (born 1948), English composer
- Darryl Towns (born 1961), American politician and member of New York State Legislature
- Edolphus Towns, (born 1934), American politician and a member of the U.S. House of Representatives from New York
- Forrest Towns (1914–1991), American track and field athlete and Olympic champion
- George W. Towns (1801–1854), American lawyer, legislator, and politician
- Greg Towns (born 1954), former Australian rules footballer
- Karl-Anthony Towns (born 1995), Dominican–American basketball player
- Kevin Towns (born 1948), former men's field hockey player and coach of New Zealand
- Lester Towns (born 1977), former American football linebacker
- Marcy Towns, American chemist
- Morris Towns (born 1954), former American football offensive tackle
- Robert Towns (c. 1794–1873), Australian businessman, pastoralist, and founder of Townsville, Queensland
- Simon Towns (born 1972), New Zealand field hockey player
- Tom Towns (born 1953), former Canadian Football League linebacker
- William Towns (1936–1993), British car designer

== Places ==
- Towns, Georgia, United States
- Towns County, Georgia, United States

== Entertainment ==
- Towns (video game)

== See also ==
- Towne
- Town (disambiguation)
- Townes (disambiguation)
