= Aston Martin V8 engine =

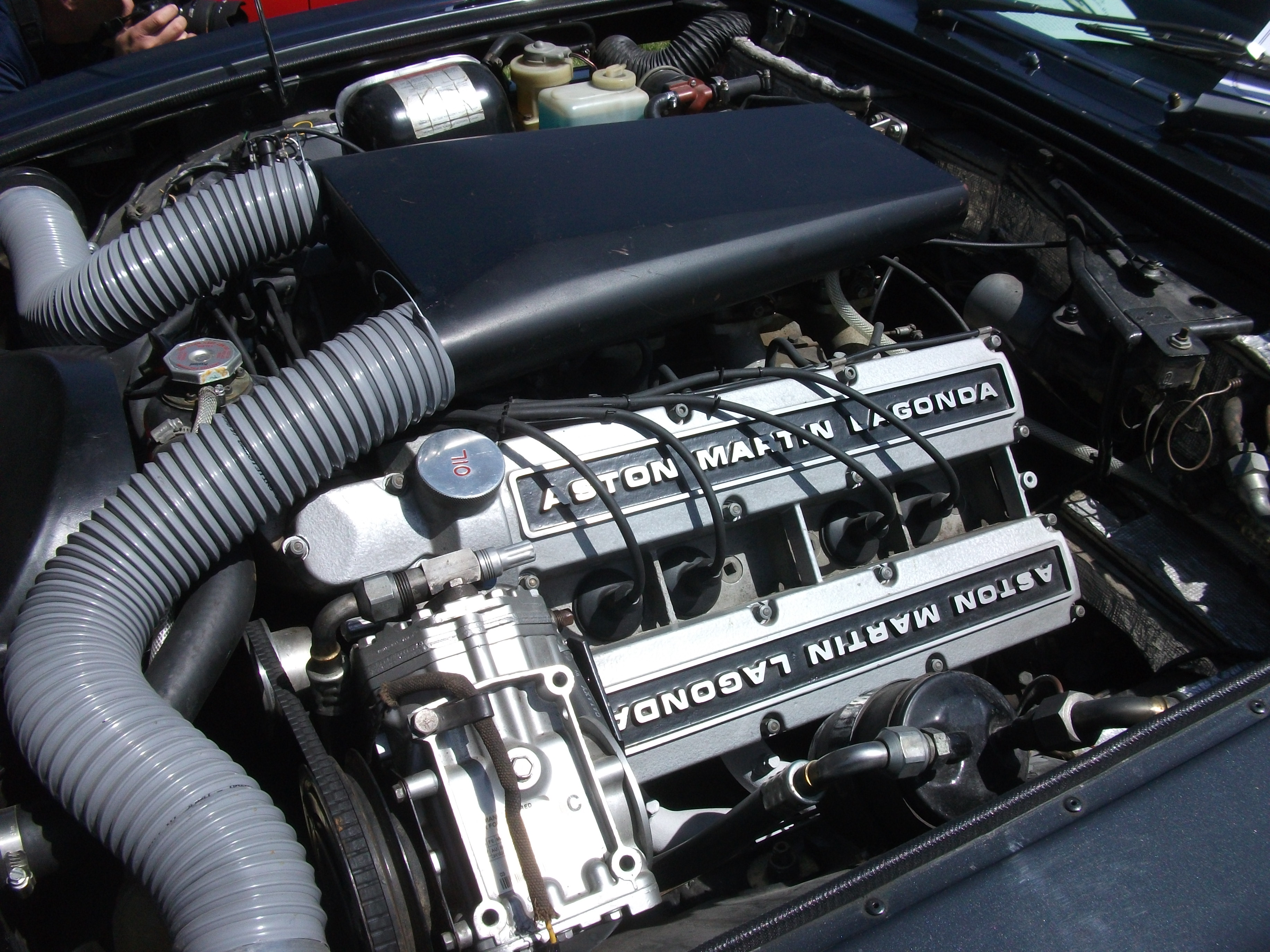

Overview
- Manufacturer: Aston Martin
- Production: 1969–2000

Layout
- Configuration: 90° V-8
- Displacement: 5.3–6.3 L (323–384 cu in)
- Cylinder bore: 3.94–4.06 in (100.1–103.1 mm)
- Piston stroke: 3.35–3.74 in (85.1–95.0 mm)
- Valvetrain: 32-valve, DOHC, two-valves per cylinder to four-valves per cylinder
- Compression ratio: 9.5:1

Combustion
- Supercharger: Eaton Twin-Superchargers mechanically-driven
- Turbocharger: Naturally-aspirated; Garrett Twin-turbocharged (1979 Aston Martin Bulldog only)
- Fuel system: Carburetor (1969–1990); Fuel injection (1989–2000)
- Oil system: Dry sump

Output
- Power output: 245–800 hp (183–597 kW)
- Torque output: 301–600 lb⋅ft (408–813 N⋅m)

Chronology
- Successor: Aston Martin V12 engine

Aston Martin has made a number of mechanically similar V8 engines over the years, since the first one used in the Aston Martin V8 in 1969. They have been both naturally-aspirated and supercharged.

== Background ==
The 1969–1972 Aston Martin DBS V8 coupe/convertible was Aston Martin's first V8 model. This engine was an all-aluminium construction with double overhead camshafts and was used in several models up until 2000 when the Virage model was discontinued.

Production of V8-engined Aston Martin cars resumed in 2005 with a new generation of the Vantage, powered by the Jaguar AJ-V8 naturally aspirated V8 engine. Since 2016, Aston Martin has switched to the Mercedes-Benz M177 turbocharged V8 engine, beginning with the DB11 model.

== Applications ==
=== Road cars ===
- Aston Martin DBS
- Aston Martin V8
- Aston Martin Lagonda
- Aston Martin Bulldog (concept car)
- Aston Martin V8 Zagato
- Aston Martin Virage
- Aston Martin V8 Vantage

=== Race cars ===
- Lola T70
- Aston Martin RHAM/1
- Nimrod NRA/C2 (Tickford)
- EMKA Aston Martin (Tickford)
- Aston Martin AMR1 (Callaway)
