= Towne =

Towne, an archaic spelling of the word town, is a surname, and may refer to:

- Benjamin Towne publisher of the first American daily newspaper, the Pennsylvania Evening Post in 1783
- Chari Towne (born 1960), American rower
- Charles A. Towne (1858–1928), U.S. Senator and U.S. Representative from Minnesota
- Charles Towne (artist) (1763–1840), English painter
- Francis Towne (1739 or 1740–1816), British landscape painter
- Gene Towne (1904–1979), American screenwriter
- Henry R. Towne (1844–1924), American mechanical engineer and entrepreneur
- John Towne (1711?–1791), British religious controversialist
- Joseph Towne (1806–1879), British anatomical modeller
- Laura Matilda Towne (1825-1901), American abolitionist and educator
- Mary Eastey (1634–1692), née Towne, executed for witchcraft by the government of the Province of Massachusetts Bay during the Salem witch trials
- Matthew Towne, American politician
- Rebecca Nurse (1621–1692), née Towne, sister of Mary Eastey, also executed for witchcraft during the Salem witch trials
- Robert Towne (1934–2024), American actor and screenwriter
- Salem Towne (1779–1864), American educator, author and politician
- Sarah Cloyce (1648–1702), née Towne, sister of Mary Eastey and Rebecca Nurse, accused but not convicted of witchcraft during the Salem witch trials

== See also ==
- Town (disambiguation)
- Townes (disambiguation)
- Towns (disambiguation)
- Toine
