= Province class =

Province class may refer to:

- Province-class fast attack craft, also called the Dhofar class, a class of fast attack craft built in the United Kingdom for Oman
- Province-class submarine, also called the Canada class, a cancelled proposed class of nuclear-powered submarines for the Canadian Forces of Canada
- Province-class destroyer, a defunct proposed class of destroyer for Canada to be the replacement for the Iroquois-class destroyers

== See also ==
- City class (disambiguation)
- Town class (disambiguation)
