= Aston Martin Bulldog =

Concept car developed by Aston Martin

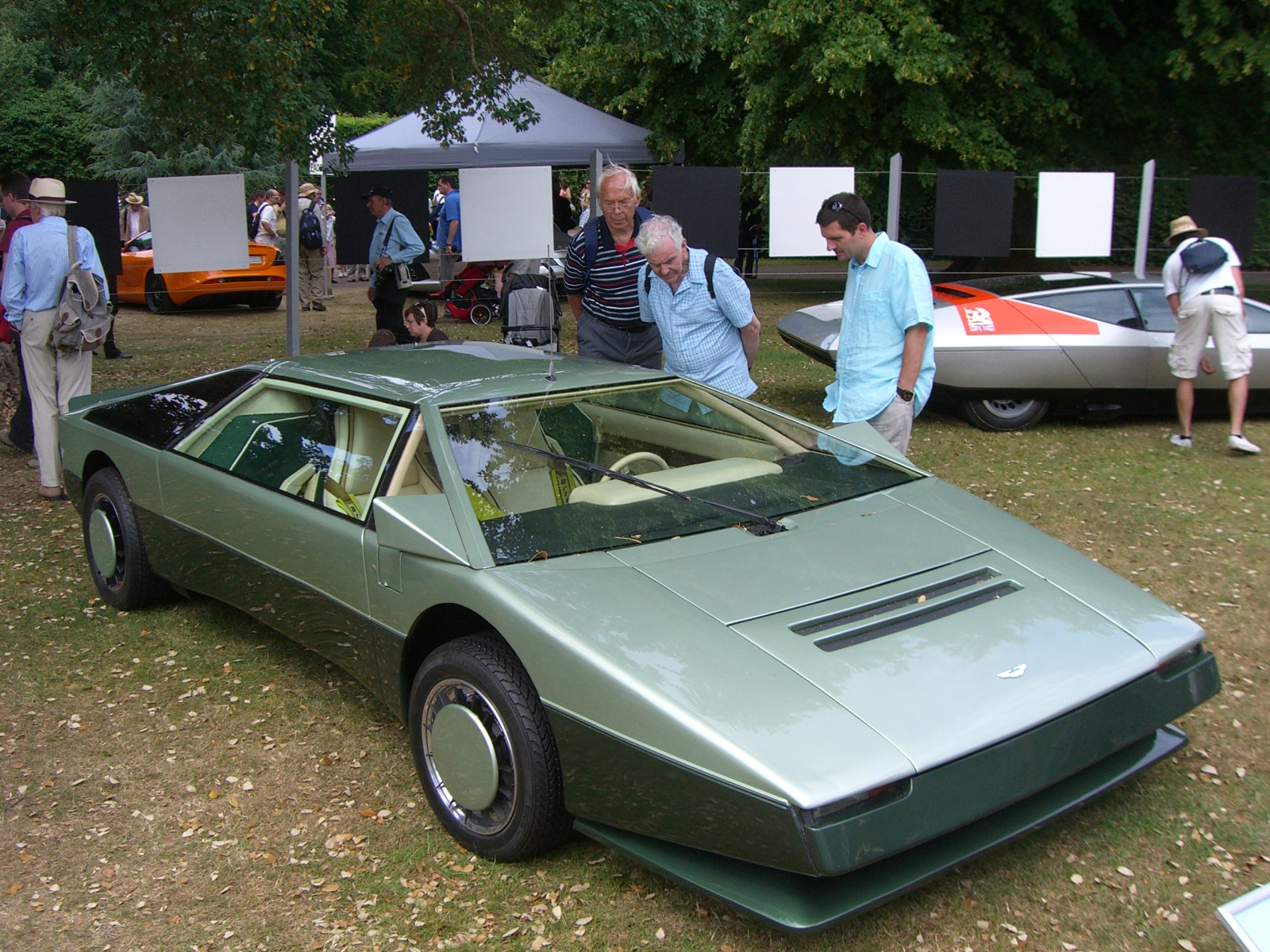
- The Bulldog at the 2009 Goodwood Festival of Speed

Overview
- Manufacturer: Aston Martin
- Production: 1979 (1 produced)
- Assembly: United Kingdom: Newport Pagnell, England
- Designer: William Towns

Body and chassis
- Class: Concept car
- Body style: 2-door coupe
- Layout: MR layout
- Doors: Gullwing

Powertrain
- Engine: 5.3 L Aston Martin twin-turbocharged V8

Dimensions
- Wheelbase: 2769 mm
- Length: 4724 mm (186 in)
- Width: 1918 mm
- Height: 1092 mm (43 in)
- Kerb weight: 1727 kg (3807 lbs)

The Aston Martin Bulldog, styled by William Towns, is a British, one-off concept vehicle produced by Aston Martin in 1979. The code name for the project was DP K901. Initially, a production run of 15–25 cars was planned, but the project was deemed too costly and only one was built.

== History ==
The Bulldog - named after a Scottish Aviation Bulldog aeroplane flown by Aston Martin's then managing director, Alan Curtis, but nicknamed "K9", after the robotic dog from the Doctor Who TV series - was designed to show off the capabilities of Aston Martin's new engineering facility in Newport Pagnell, as well as to chase after the title of fastest production car in the world. The car was officially launched on 27 March 1980 at the Bell Hotel at Aston Clinton. Although the car was built in the UK, it is left-hand-drive. The Bulldog's sharp wedge shape was designed by William Towns. The car has five centre-mounted, hidden headlamps and gull-wing doors. The interior is upholstered in leather with walnut trim and uses multiple LED buttons like the Lagonda. Aston Martin planned to build 15–25 Bulldogs, but in 1981 Victor Gauntlett became chairman of the company and decided the project would be too costly, so the Bulldog project was shelved. In 1984 Aston Martin sold the Bulldog to a Middle Eastern collector for £130,000. The owner added both rear view mirrors and cameras. The Bulldog later was sold to an American collector and spent some time in the United States; it was later in storage in different places.

It was shown at the Goodwood Festival of Speed in 2009, and at Aston Martin's 100th anniversary celebration at Kensington Park Gardens in July 2013.

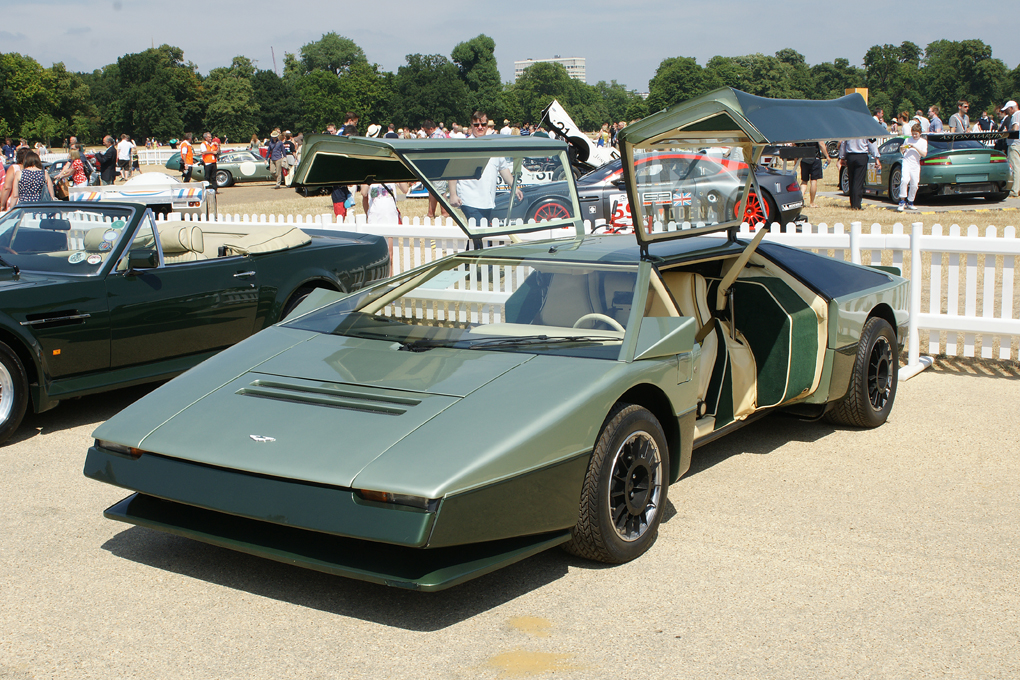
With gull-wing doors open at Aston Martin's centennial celebration at Kensington Palace in July 2013

It was found in storage in the Far East, and offered for sale in the UK. It was now green, compared to original exterior colours of silver and light grey. The interior had also been changed from the original dark brown and black to light tan.

== 2020 restoration ==
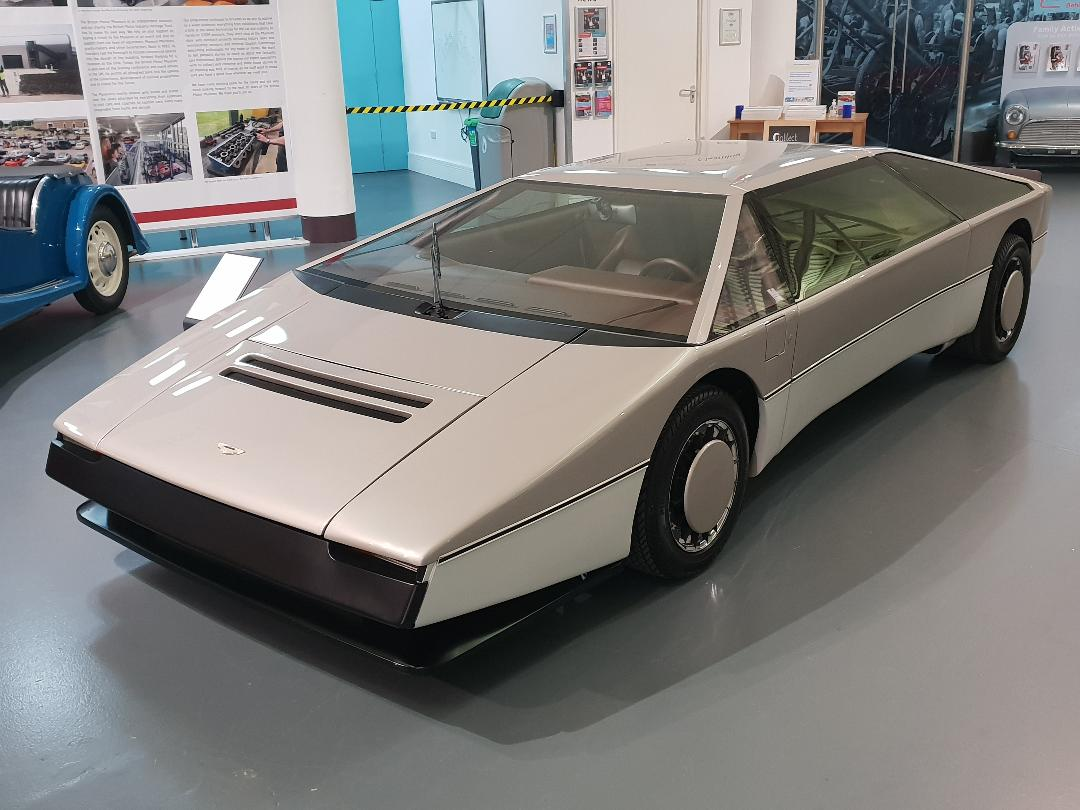
After 2020 restoration

In 2020 the car was purchased by American collector Phillip Sarofim and a full restoration project managed by Victor Gauntlett's son Richard was organised.

Under its new ownership, plans were unveiled in early 2021 for Classic Motor Cars Ltd in Bridgnorth to perform a nut and bolt restoration with the aim of reaching 200mph. In November 2021 the car's rebuild had been completed and the car achieved a speed of 162mph (261 km/h) on its initial shakedown on the main runway at RNAS Yeovilton.

On 6 June 2023 BBC Radio 4's news reported that the car had reached its promised 200 mph speed at Campbeltown Airport in Scotland, reaching a speed of 205.4 mph (330.55 km/h).

On 18 August 2024, the Bulldog was entered into the Pebble Beach Concours d'Elegance where it won first place in the "Wedge-shaped Concept Cars and Prototypes (Late)" class.

== Performance ==
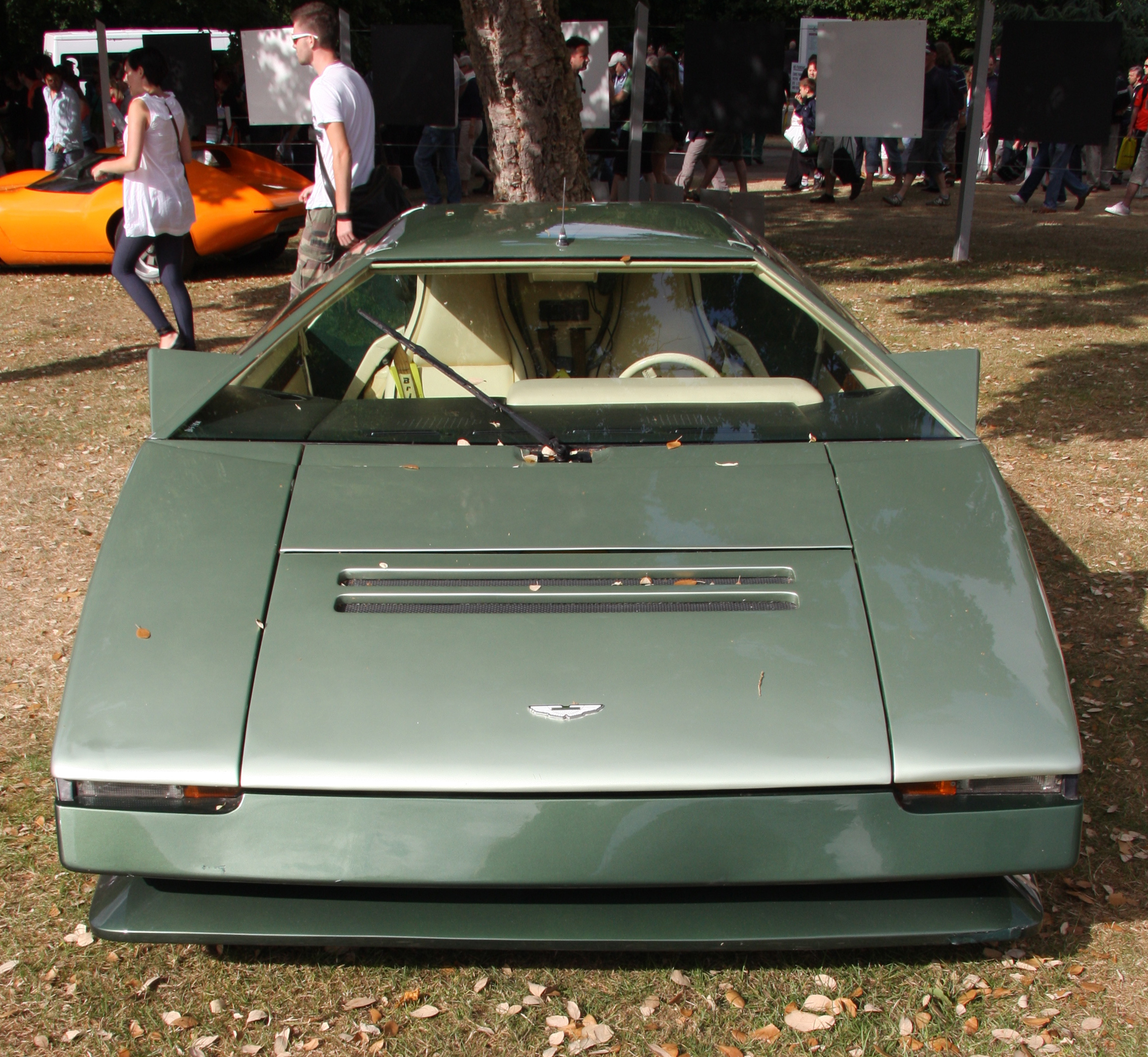
The front end of the Bulldog featured five centre-mounted hidden headlamps.

The Bulldog is powered by a 5.3 litre V8 engine with twin Garrett turbochargers that produces 600 bhp (447 kW; 608 PS). The engine was capable of 700 bhp (522 kW; 710 PS) on the test bed, and 500 lb⋅ft (678 N⋅m) maximum torque. When it came out, Aston Martin claimed the car was capable of 237 mph (381 km/h), but the highest speed the car was recorded reaching at that time was 191 mph (307 km/h) during a test run at the Motor Industry Research Association track in late 1979. The wedge-shaped design gave the Bulldog a drag coefficient of 0.34.
