= Town (disambiguation) =

A town is a human settlement that is generally larger than a village but smaller than a city.

Town may also refer to:

== People ==
- A. Hays Town (1903–2005), American architect
- David Town (born 1976), English footballer
- Harold Town (1924–1990), Canadian abstract painter
- Hiram S. Town (1832–1901), American farmer and politician
- Ithiel Town (1784–1844), American architect and civil engineer
- Phil Town (born 1948), American investor and motivational speaker
- Gustavus Town Kirby (1874–1956), American leader on sports committees

== Places ==
=== United Kingdom ===
- Town (Doncaster ward), South Yorkshire, England
- Town (Newcastle-under-Lyme ward), an electoral ward in Staffordshire, England
- Town (Enfield ward), a Greater London electoral ward
- Town (Hammersmith and Fulham ward), a Greater London electoral ward
- Town (Kingston upon Thames ward), a Greater London electoral ward
- Town, Merthyr Tydfil, a community and ward in Wales
- Town Loch, a loch in Fife, Scotland

=== United States ===
- Town Creek (disambiguation), several communities and waterways
- Town Lake, a reservoir on the Colorado River in Austin, Texas
- Town River, a river in Plymouth County, Massachusetts
- Town Cove, a New England beach in Eastham, Massachusetts
- Downtown Honolulu, in Hawaii, is often colloquially referred to as "town" by Honolulu residents.

=== Other places ===
- Town Reach, a section of the Brisbane River, Queensland, Australia
- Town Island, an island in the New Territories of Hong Kong
- Town, a town in Sud-Est, Haiti
- Town Island (Lake of the Woods), an island in Ontario, Canada
- Town Abyssal Plain, a submarine topographical feature in the South Atlantic

== Other uses ==
- Town class (disambiguation), a list of types of ships
- Town (magazine), a British men's magazine of the 1950s and 60s
- "Town" (song), a 1996 song by Northern Uproar
- TOWN, a working title for the 2019 Game Freak role-playing game Little Town Hero
- In New York State and Wisconsin, a civil township, a division of a county, with its own government.
- Market town, type of settlement

== See also ==
- Taun (disambiguation)
- The Town (disambiguation)
- This Town (disambiguation)
- Ton (disambiguation)
- Toon (disambiguation)
- Townes (disambiguation)
- Towns (disambiguation)
- Township (disambiguation)
