= The Town =

The Town may refer to:

== Film and television ==
- The Town (1945 film), a World War II propaganda film
- The Town (2010 film), a crime thriller film directed by and starring Ben Affleck
- The Town (2022 film), an Iranian drama film
- The Town (2012 TV series), a drama written by Mike Bartlett
- "The Town" (The Simpsons), episode in the 28th season

== Literature ==
- The Town (Richter novel), by Conrad Richter
- The Town (Faulkner novel), by William Faulkner
- The Town (newspaper), published in London from 1837 to 1840

== Other uses ==
- The Town (festival), a music festival in São Paulo, Brazil
- The Town (Strindberg), 1902 painting by August Strindberg
- "The Town" (The Weeknd song), from the 2013 album Kiss Land
- Longford Town F.C., an Irish association football club
- The Town FC, an MLS Next Pro soccer team in Moraga, California
- Oakland, California, a city in the United States
- The Town, an entertainment industry podcast hosted by journalist Matthew Belloni

== See also ==
- Town (disambiguation)
