= City class =

City class may refer to:

- City-class frigate, the Halifax-class frigate of the Royal Canadian Navy
- City-class ironclad, the "Pook Turtles", a.k.a. Eads gunboats
- City-class mine countermeasures vessel, the mine countermeasures vessel under construction for the Belgian and Dutch navies
- Global Combat Ship a design of frigate under construction, to be called the Type 26 or "City class" when introduced to the British Royal Navy
- GWR 3700 Class locomotives, nicknamed "City class"

== See also ==
- Town class (disambiguation)
- GWR Metropolitan Class
- Province class (disambiguation)
