= Town class =

Town class may refer to:

- Town Class (sailboat), a class of American dory
- Town-class cruiser (1910), a group of 21 British and Australian light cruisers
- Town-class cruiser (1936), a group of 10 British light cruisers
- Town-class destroyer, a group of American destroyers transferred to other navies

== See also ==
- City class (disambiguation)
- Province class (disambiguation)
