= Taun =

Taun may refer to:

- Pometia pinnata, the taun tree, a tropical hardwood fruit tree
- Tione di Trento, Trentino, Italy; also called "Taun"
- taun, the Javanese lunar year, see Javanese calendar
- taun, a wasei-eigo term, see List of wasei-eigo

== See also ==
- Tauns River, India
- Tauntaun
- Ton (disambiguation)
- Town (disambiguation)
