= Township (disambiguation) =

Township is a unit of local government. The term may also refer to:

- Township (Canada)
- Townships of the People's Republic of China
- Townships of Myanmar
- Township (Taiwan)
- Township (England)
- Township (South Africa) refers to the urban living areas that, under Apartheid, were reserved for non-whites
- Survey township, or Congressional township, used by the United States Public Land Survey System
- Civil township, unit of local government in the United States
- Township (United States)
- Alberta Township System, Canada
- Township Roads in Saskatchewan
- Township, as defined by the Canadian Dominion Land Survey

== Other uses ==
- Township (unit), a unit in US surveyors' measures
- Township (video game), a 2013 freemium city-building game

== See also ==
- Town (disambiguation)
