= Townes =

Townes may refer to:

== People ==
=== Given name ===
- Townes Van Zandt (1944–1997), American singer songwriter
  - Townes Van Zandt (album), eponymous album
  - Townes (album), 2009 album by Steve Earle, dedicated to Townes Van Zandt

=== Surname ===
- Carol Lynn Townes, American gospel singer
- Charles Hard Townes (1915–2015), American Nobel Prize-winning physicist
- Clarence L. Townes Jr. (1928–2017), American businessperson, politician, and civic activist
- Harry Townes (1914–2001), American television and movie actor
- Henry Keith Townes (1913–1990), American entomologist
- Jeffrey Townes (born 1965), an American singer, more commonly known as DJ Jazzy Jeff
- Linton Townes (born 1959), American basketball player
- Marques Townes (born 1995), American basketball player
- Marvin Townes (born 1980), American football running back
- Sandra L. Townes (1944-2018), federal judge for the United States District Court for the Eastern District of New York
- Philip L. Townes, physician and human geneticist who identified Townes–Brocks syndrome

== Other ==
- Townes (album), 2009 Steve Earle album

== See also ==
- Towne, a surname (including a list of people with the name)
- Town (disambiguation)
- Towns (disambiguation)
- Autler–Townes effect, change in the absorption/emission spectra
- Tonnes (name)
