= This Town =

This Town may refer to:

- "This Town" (Frank Sinatra song)
- "This Town" (Niall Horan song)
- "This Town", a song by Kygo, featuring Sasha Sloan
- "This Town", a song by O.A.R. from the album All Sides
- "This Town", a song by Roger Miller from The 3rd Time Around
- "This Town", a song by The Go-Go's from Beauty and the Beat
- "This Town", a song by Orchestral Manoeuvres in the Dark, from the B-side of "(Forever) Live and Die"
- "This Town", a song by Elton John from Ice on Fire
- This Town (album), by the Flying Emus (1987)
- This Town: Two Parties and a Funeral-Plus, Plenty of Valet Parking!-in America's Gilded Capital, a 2013 book by Mark Leibovich
- This Town (TV series), 2024 British television series from Steven Knight
  - This Town (soundtrack), 2024 soundtrack of the TV series

== See also ==
- "This Town Ain't Big Enough for Both of Us"
- Town (disambiguation)
