= Town Class (sailboat) =

Town Class sailboats are 16 1/2-foot-long (5.0 m) lap strake one-design dories, constructed in either wood or fiberglass. The Town Class was designed as an affordable boat for the townspeople, hence its name.

== History ==
The first Town Class sailboat was designed and built (in wood only) in 1932 by Marcus C. Lowell in Amesbury, Massachusetts. Marcus' son, Percival M. "Pert" Lowell, later took over the business and relocated to Newbury, Massachusetts. In 1936, the Town Class sailboat was adopted as a one-design class boat and quickly became a popular racing boat from Maine to Florida. In the late 1960s, fiberglass models became available. Currently, more than two thousand wood and fiberglass "Townies" have been built to date. The Pert Lowell Company, which is now operated by "Pert" Lowell's son-in-law, Ralph Johnson, continues to construct these boats today.

== Town Class Regatta ==
The National Town Class Association was formed in 1962, also marking the first year of the Town Class National Regatta (an annual two-day racing event) which took place in Nahant, Massachusetts. The Town Class Nationals have been held in Marblehead, Wakefield, Sharon, and Newburyport, Massachusetts; as well as Touisset Point, Rhode Island and Spofford Lake New Hampshire. The Nationals now alternate between Marblehead, Nahant, Touisset, and Spofford.
