= William Towns =

British car designer (1936–1993)

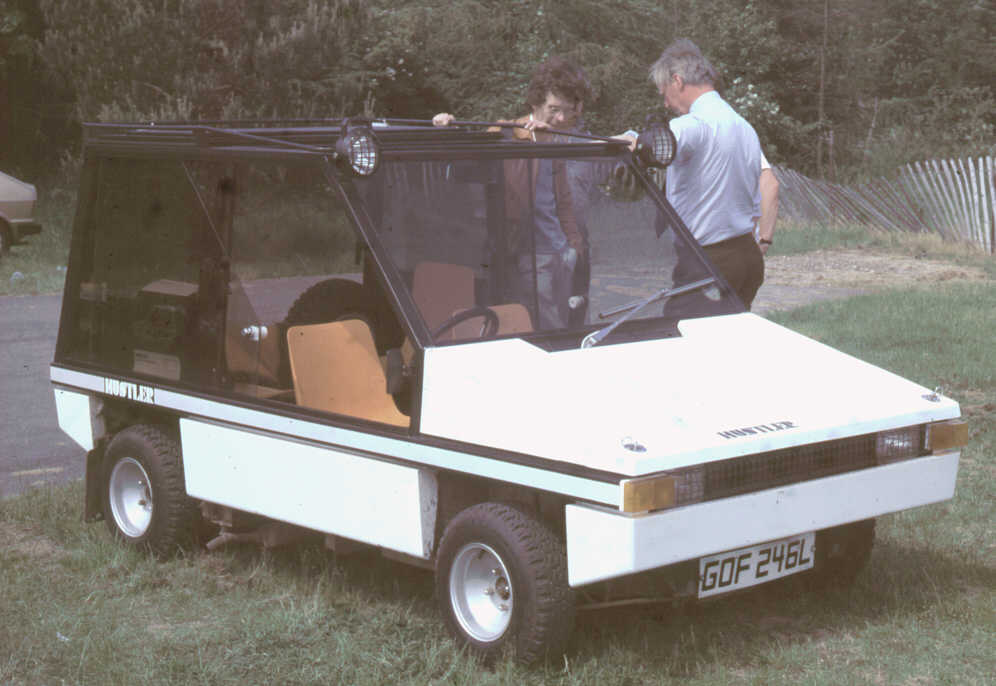
- 1979 Hustler. William Towns is behind the car, facing the camera
- Born: 1936
- Died: 1993 (aged 56–57)
- Occupations: Engineer, designer
- Years active: 1954–1993
- Known for: Automotive design
- Notable work: Aston Martin DBS; Aston Martin Lagonda; Rover-BRM
- Spouse: Elizabeth Percival

William Towns (25 July 1936 – 7 June 1993) also known as Bill Towns, was an English car designer, most known for his designs for Aston Martin, including the 1967 DBS, as well as the futuristic and angular Mk.II Lagonda and Bulldog concept car.

== Design career ==
Towns began his training as a designer at Rootes in 1954, where he was mainly involved in the styling of seats and door handles. Later he was also involved with the styling of their Hillman Hunter. He moved to Rover in 1963 and worked there for David Bache and designed the body of the Rover-BRM gas turbine Le Mans car. In 1966, he left Rover to join Aston Martin as a seat designer. In 1967 he was asked to design the body for the new DBS. In 1976, he designed the Aston Martin Lagonda luxury sedan.

He left Aston Martin in 1977 for more remunerative industrial design work, setting up his own design studio, Interstyl. As a freelance designer, he worked on the Jensen-Healey, the successful Hustler kit-car, the Reliant SS2 and the short-lived Railton F28/F29.

== Death ==
Towns died at the age of 56 from cancer in June 1993 at his home in Compton Verney, Warwickshire.

== Car collection ==
Until July 2005, his own cars were on display at the Heritage Motor Centre, Gaydon, UK.

== Gallery ==
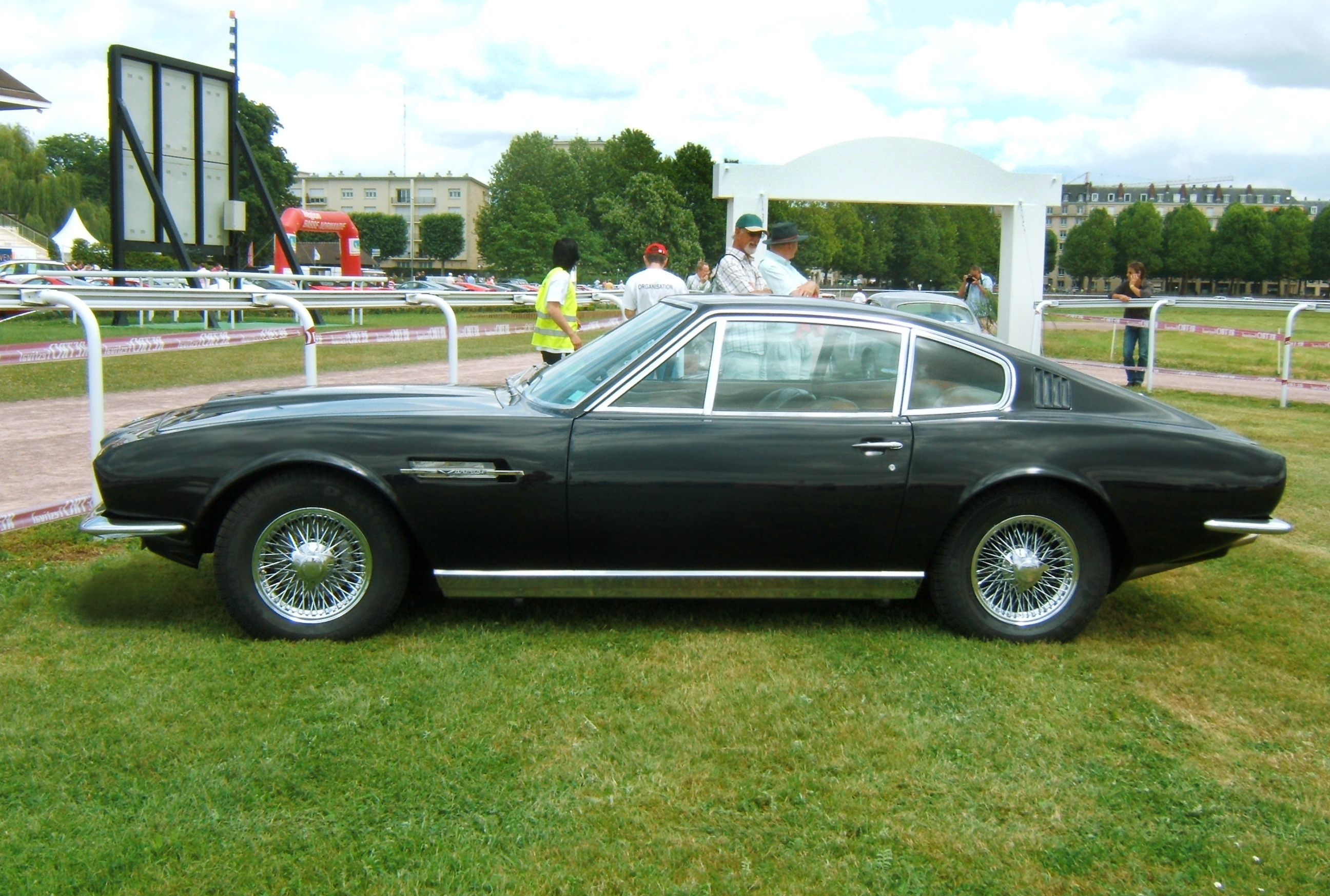
1969 Aston Martin DBS

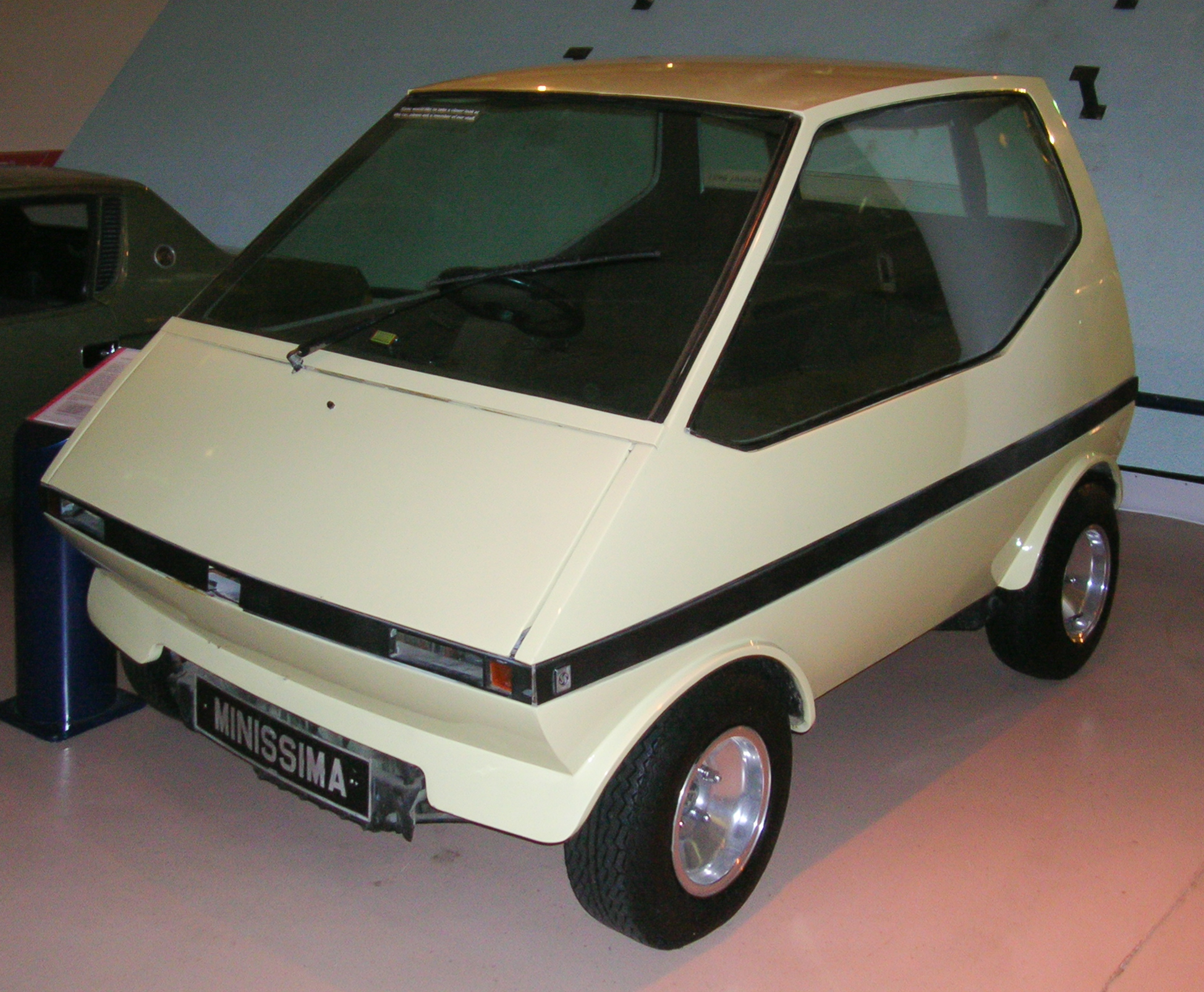
1972 Minissima

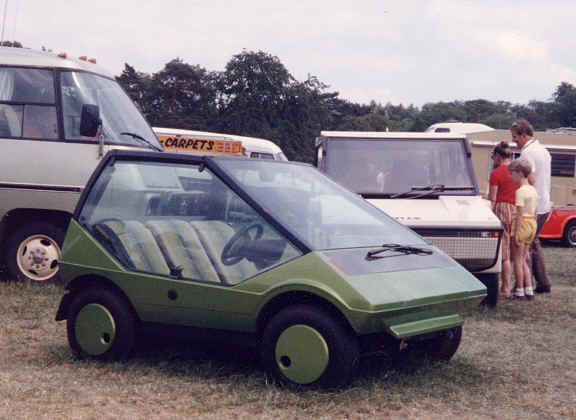
1976 Microdot

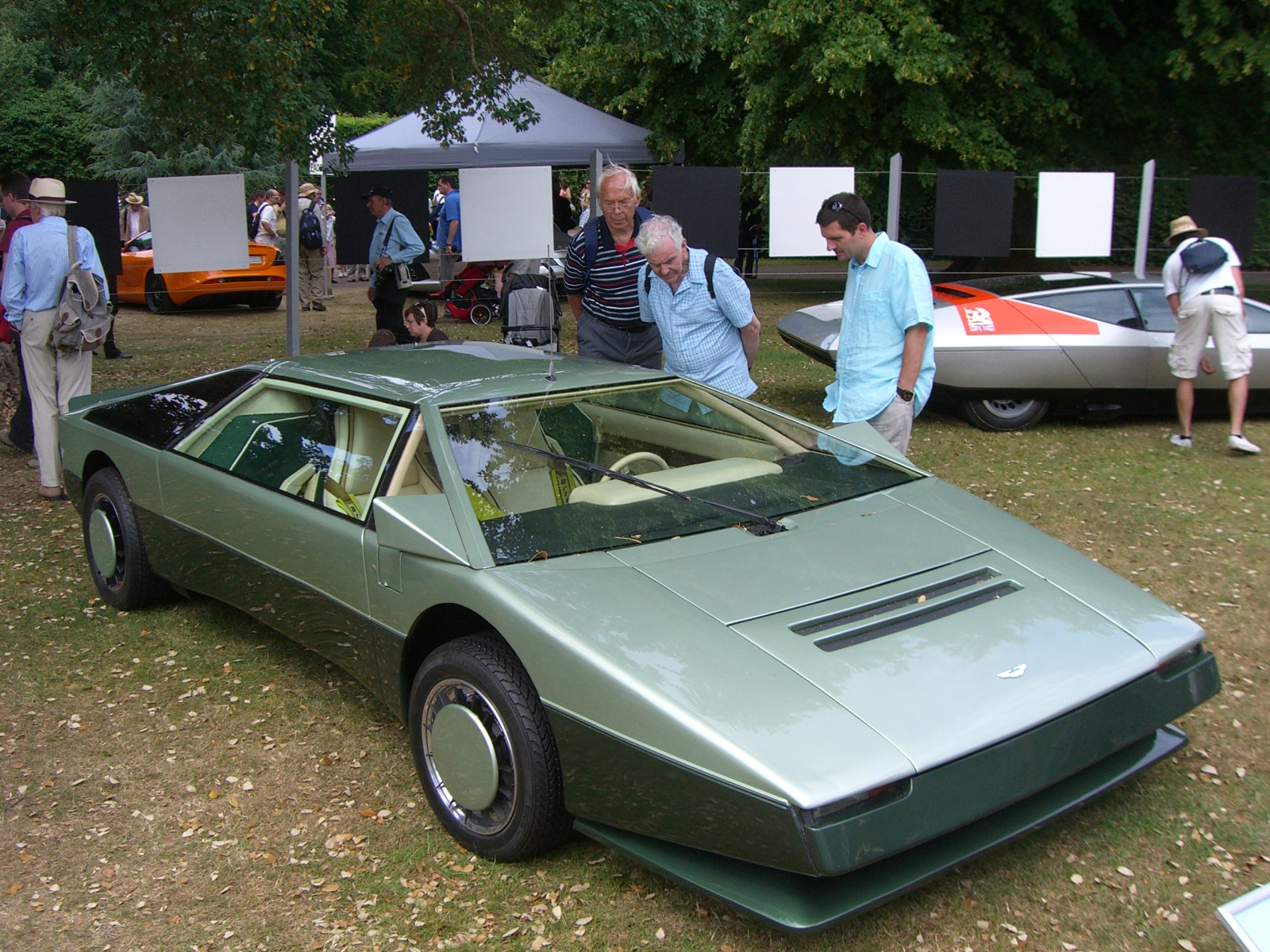
1979 Aston Martin Bulldog concept

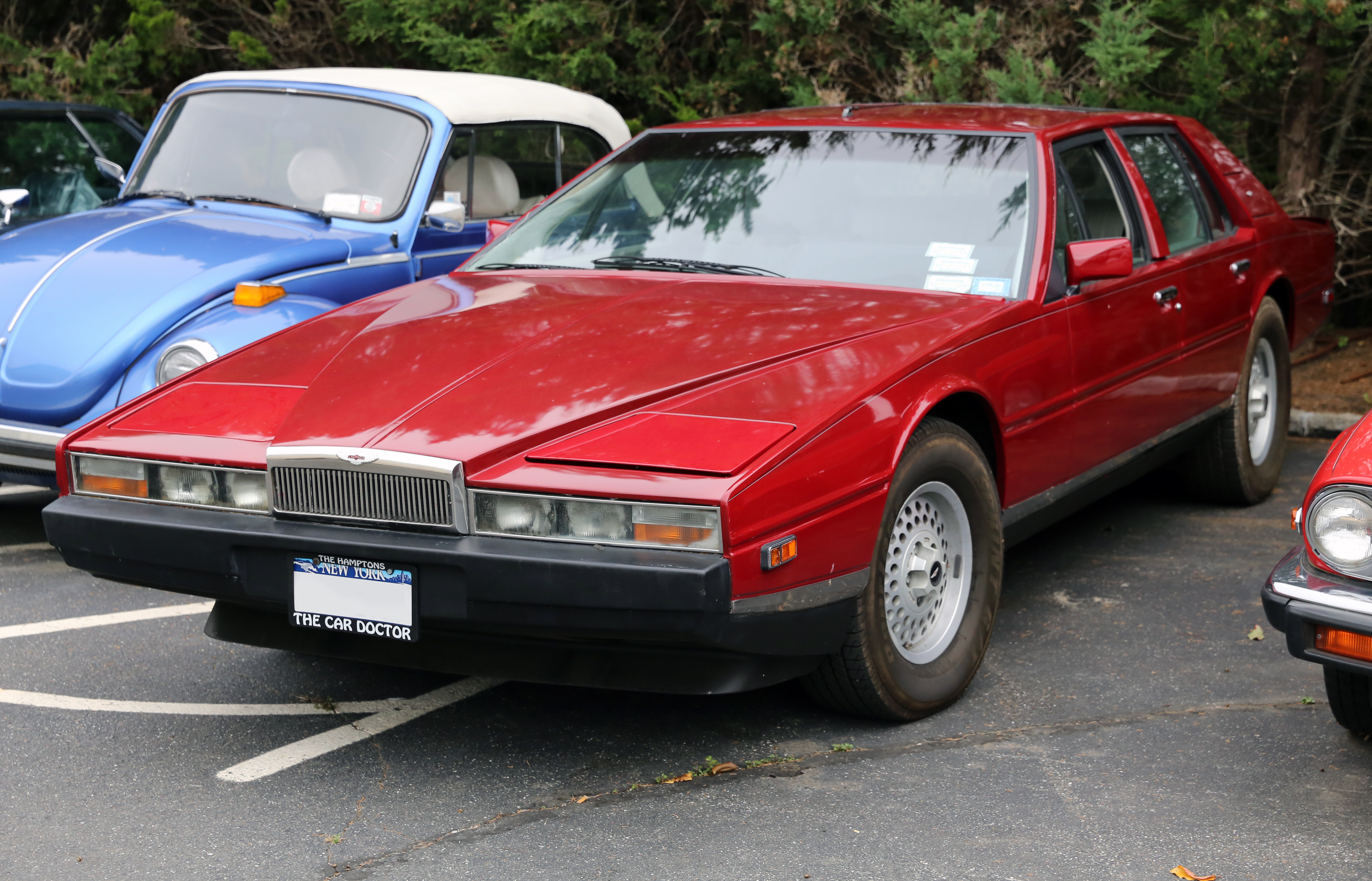
1984 Aston Martin Lagonda

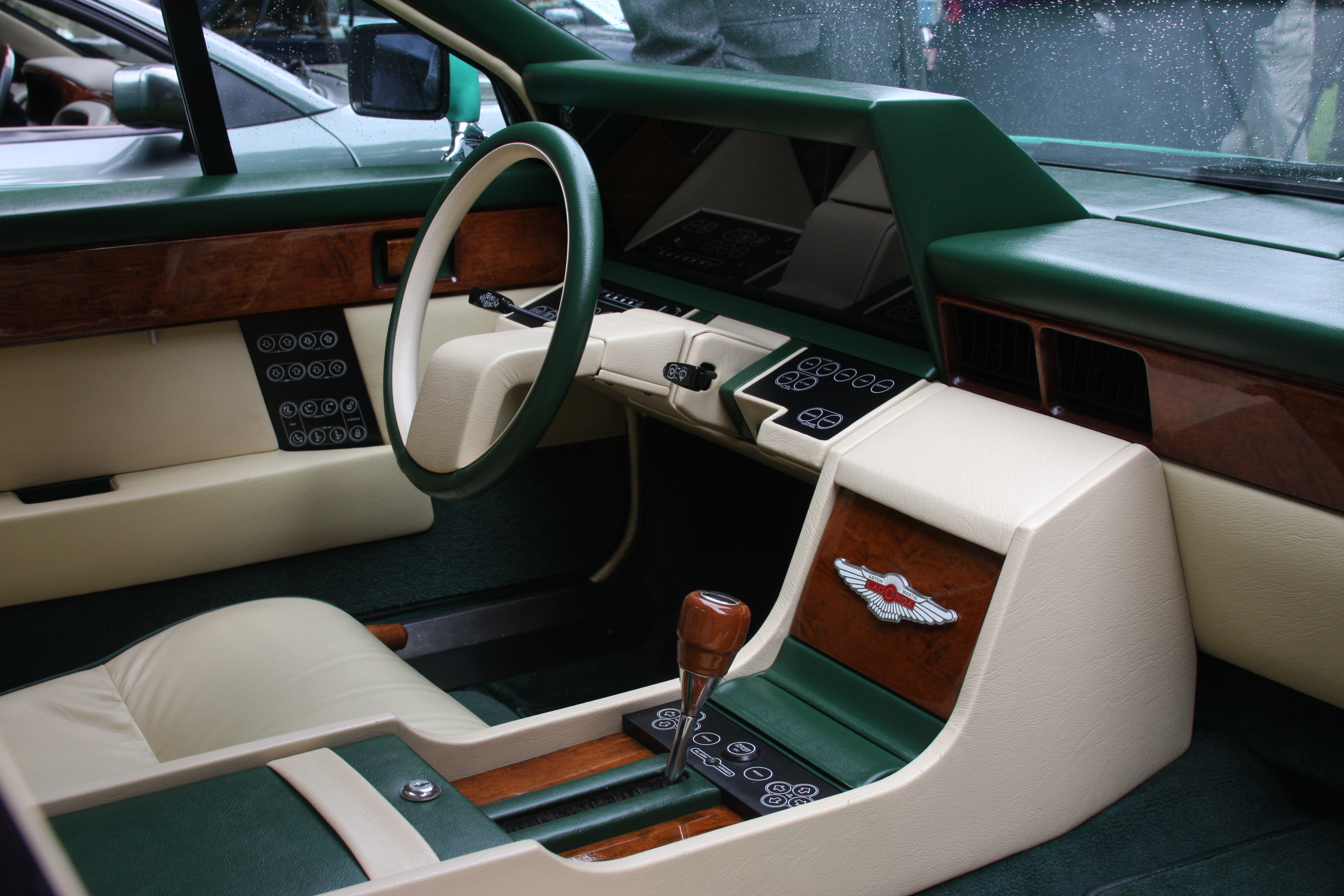
Lagonda S.2 interior design

== Cars designed by Towns ==
- 1964 Rover-BRM gas turbine car (with David Bache)
- 1967 Aston Martin DBS
- 1972 Jensen-Healey
- 1972 Minissima
- 1974 Aston Martin Lagonda
- 1974 Guyson E12
- 1976 Microdot
- 1976 Aston Martin Lagonda Series 2
- 1978 Hustler
- 1980 Aston Martin Bulldog
- 1985 TXC Tracer
- 1988 Reliant SS2
- 1989 Railton F28 Fairmile and F29 Claremont
- 1992 Reliant Scimitar Sabre
