= Aston Martin DBS =

Grand tourer produced by Aston Martin (1967–1972)

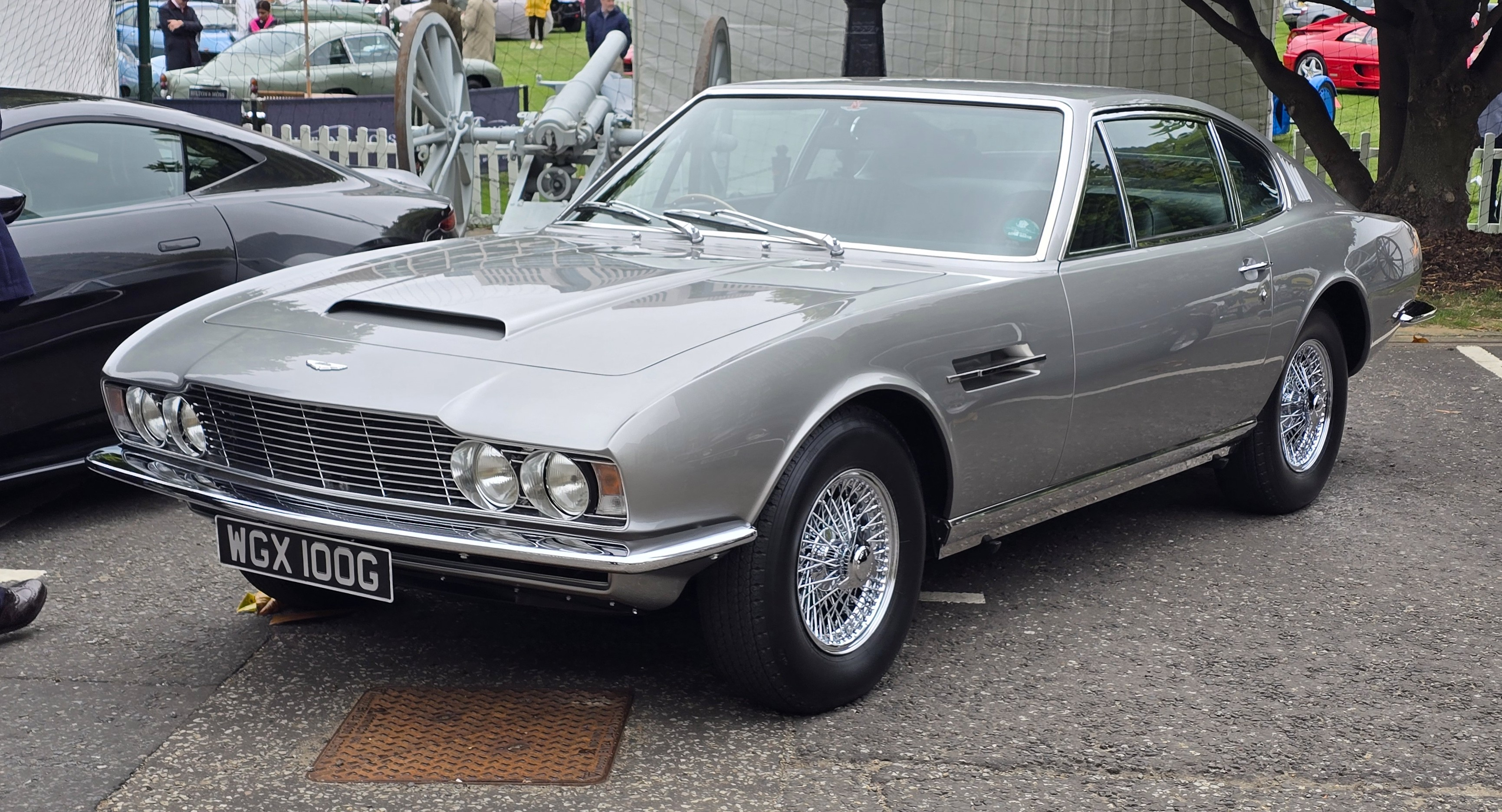

Overview
- Manufacturer: Aston Martin Ltd.
- Production: 1967–1972; 787 produced
- Assembly: United Kingdom: Newport Pagnell, Buckinghamshire, England
- Designer: William Towns

Body and chassis
- Class: Grand tourer
- Body style: 2-door coupé
- Layout: FR layout
- Related: Aston Martin V8

Powertrain
- Engine: 4.0 L DOHC I6; 5.3 L V8 (DBS V8)
- Transmission: 5-speed ZF manual; 3-speed Borg-Warner or Chrysler automatic

Dimensions
- Wheelbase: 2,610 mm (102.8 in)
- Length: 4,580 mm (180.3 in)
- Width: 1,830 mm (72.0 in)
- Height: 1,330 mm (52.4 in)
- Kerb weight: 1,588 kg (3,501 lb) (DBS); 1,727 kg (3,807 lb) (DBS V8)

Chronology
- Successor: Aston Martin Vantage (DBS); Aston Martin V8 (DBS V8)

The Aston Martin DBS is a grand tourer produced by the British manufacturer Aston Martin Lagonda Limited from 1967 to 1972.

From 2007 to 2012, the DBS name was resurrected for a new model, also called the Aston Martin DBS.

== DBS (1967–1972) ==
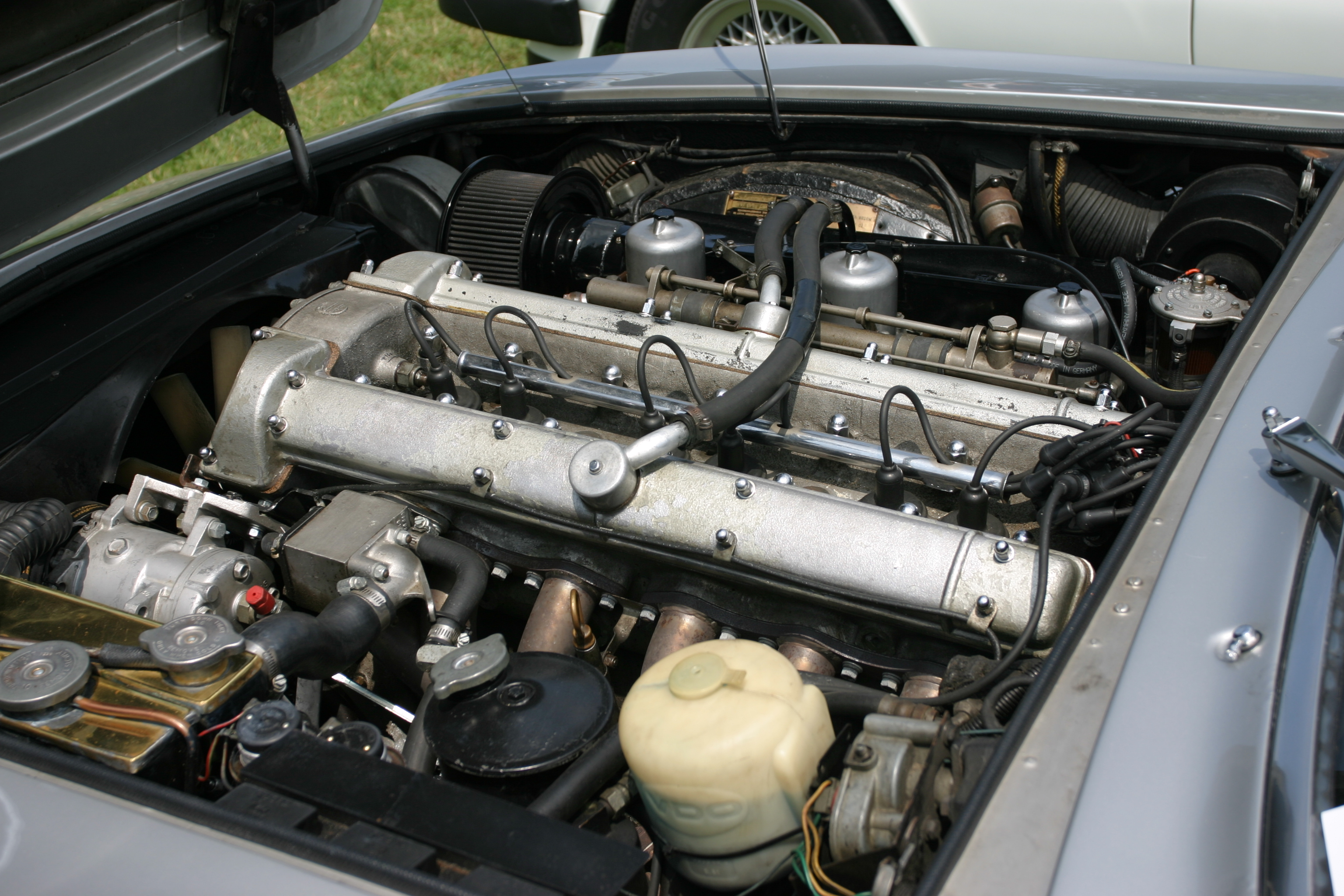
The Tadek Marek-designed inline-six engine of a DBS

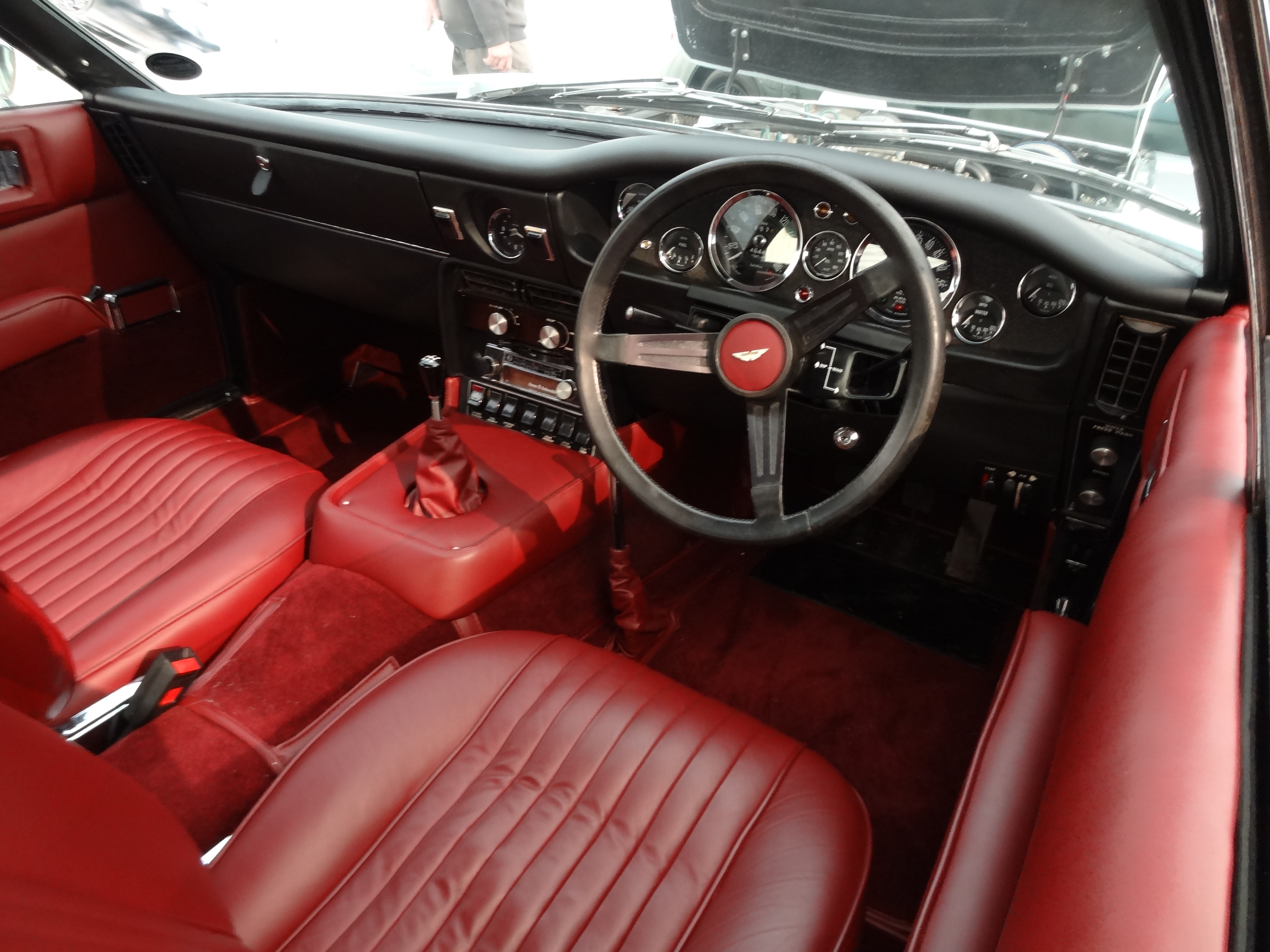
Interior

The DBS was intended as the successor to the Aston Martin DB6, although the two ran concurrently for three years. Powered by a straight-six engine, it was produced from 1967 until 1972, eventually being phased out in favour of the Aston Martin V8.

It was a larger coupé than the DB6, with four full sized seats, but was powered by the same 4.0 L engine as the previous car. Claimed engine output was 280 bhp (209 kW; 284 PS), but a Vantage engine option used Italian made Weber carburettors, increasing output to an advertised 325 bhp (242 kW; 330 PS).

In 1966, Touring of Milan was commissioned to design the DB6 replacement and produced two prototypes before the design house went out of business. The DB6 was incapable of accommodating the planned V8-engine and had to be replaced. William Towns was then hastily brought in to design the new car. The DBS was intended to have a more "modern" look than the previous series of Aston models (the DB4 through DB6), and it incorporated a fastback style rear end and squared off front grille, atypical of Astons at the time but very much then in vogue in automotive design circles of the late sixties. Trademark Aston design features, such as a bonnet scoop, knock-off wire wheels with 815X15 Crossplys or 205VR15 Pirelli Cinturato CN72 Radial Tyres, and side air vents with stainless steel brightwork were however retained. The DBS was the last Aston Martin to be developed under David Brown's control.

=== Specifications ===
- Weight: 1,588 kg (3,501 lb)
- Engine: 3995 cc DOHC straight-6
- Power: 280 bhp (209 kW; 284 PS) at 4500 rpm
- Torque: 288 lb⋅ft (390 N⋅m) at 3850 rpm
- 0–60 mph (97 km/h): 7.1 seconds
- Top speed: 140 mph (225 km/h)

== DBS V8 (1969–1972) ==
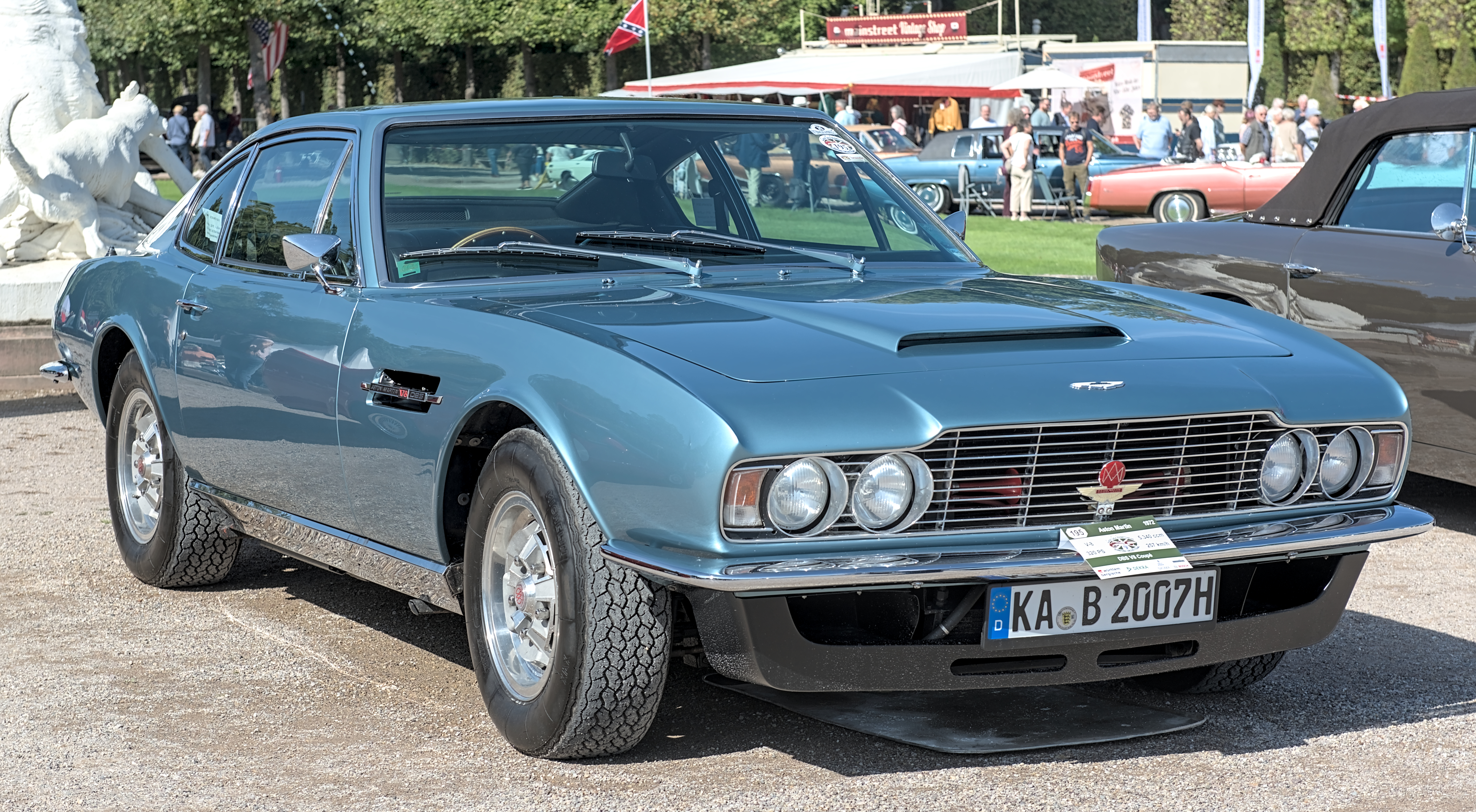
1972 Aston Martin DBS V8

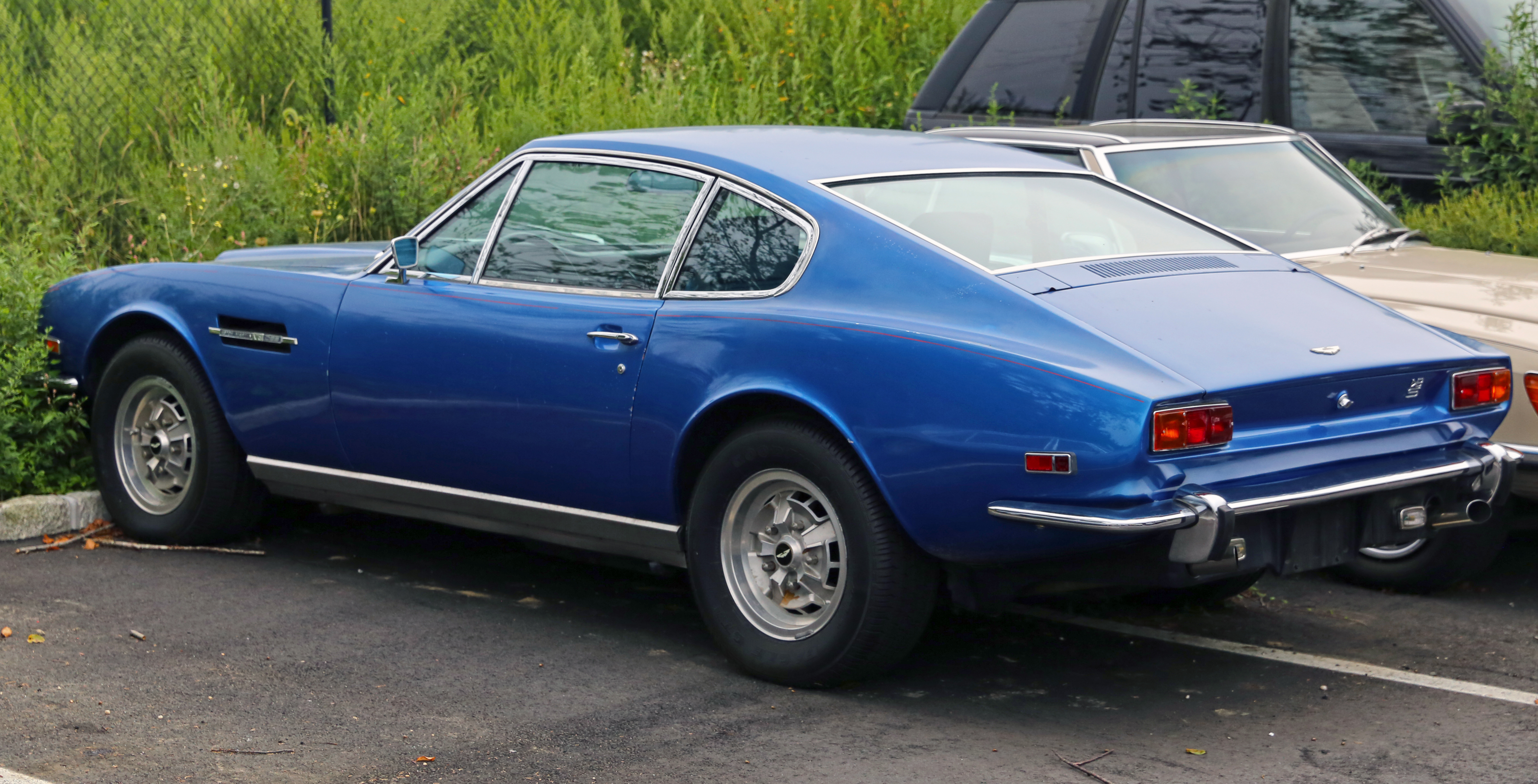
Aston Martin DBS V8 (rear view)

In September 1969, the DBS was made available with the 5340 cc V8 engine for which it was always intended, this variant being known as the DBS V8. At the time, it was the fastest four-seater production car in the world. The new model was fitted with light alloy wheels (as opposed to wire wheels on the DBS) fitted with Pirelli 225/70VR15 Cinturato CN12 and ventilated brake discs. An automatic transmission was offered as an alternative to the ZF 5-speed manual gearbox. The DBS V8 was produced until May 1972, after which it was given a single headlamp front end and was renamed simply the Aston Martin V8.

=== Specifications ===
- Weight: 1,727 kg (3,807 lb)
- Engine: 5340 cc V8
- Power: 320 bhp (239 kW; 324 PS) at 5000 rpm
- Torque: 240 lb⋅ft (325 N⋅m) at 5000 rpm
- 0–60 mph (97 km/h): 6 seconds
- Top speed: 140 mph (225 km/h)

== Lagonda ==
In 1969, the Lagonda name was briefly resurrected, appearing on a four-door prototype of the DBS model. The prototype was allocated chassis MP230/1 and was retained by the factory until 1972 and used by Sir David Brown as his personal car, registered JPP 5G. The car originally ran a prototype 5-litre V8 engine but this was quickly replaced by an early 5.3-litre production quad carb version (VS4008EE).

Between 1974 and 1976, seven Lagonda four-door saloons were produced based on the 1969 prototype. The production models adopted a single-headlight treatment with a Lagonda "horseshoe" grille in place of the twin-headlamp treatment of the prototype.

== In popular culture ==
The DBS was used by George Lazenby's James Bond in the 1969 film On Her Majesty's Secret Service. Unlike Bond's previous car, the Aston Martin DB5, no gadgets were seen in this car, other than a mounting for a telescopic-sight rifle in the glove compartment. In the final scenes of the film, Bond's wife, Tracy, is shot and killed whilst sitting in the car.

A second DBS also appears in a brief single scene in the next Bond film, Diamonds are Forever. It can be seen in the background being fitted with small missiles at Q Branch whilst Bond is talking to Q on the telephone.

Another DBS was later used in the TV series The Persuaders! (1971–1972), in which Roger Moore's character Lord Brett Sinclair drove a distinctive "Bahama Yellow" 6-cylinder DBS (chassis number DBS/5636/R) that, through the use of alloy wheels and different badges, had been made to look like the DBS V8 model. Supplied by Aston Martin to the show's producers, the car used the personalised number plate "BS 1" (except for one scene in the episode "The Gold Napoleon," where the car has its original UK registration number PPP 6H instead), courtesy of the plate's real owner Billy Smart, Jr. After filming ended it was sold by the factory, via HR Owen in London, to its first private owner. It was later restored by the Aston Martin factory, and is currently owned by divorce lawyer and art collector Jeremy Levison. Roger Moore and co-star Tony Curtis both signed the underside of the car's boot lid (rear luggage compartment): Moore at Pinewood Studios in May 2003; Curtis at Cheltenham Racecourse in October 2008.

Kenneth Haigh as Joe Lampton drove a DBS in the television series Man at the Top.

== See also ==
- List of James Bond vehicles
