= Aston Martin Lagonda =

Full-sized luxury four-door saloon car by Aston Martin

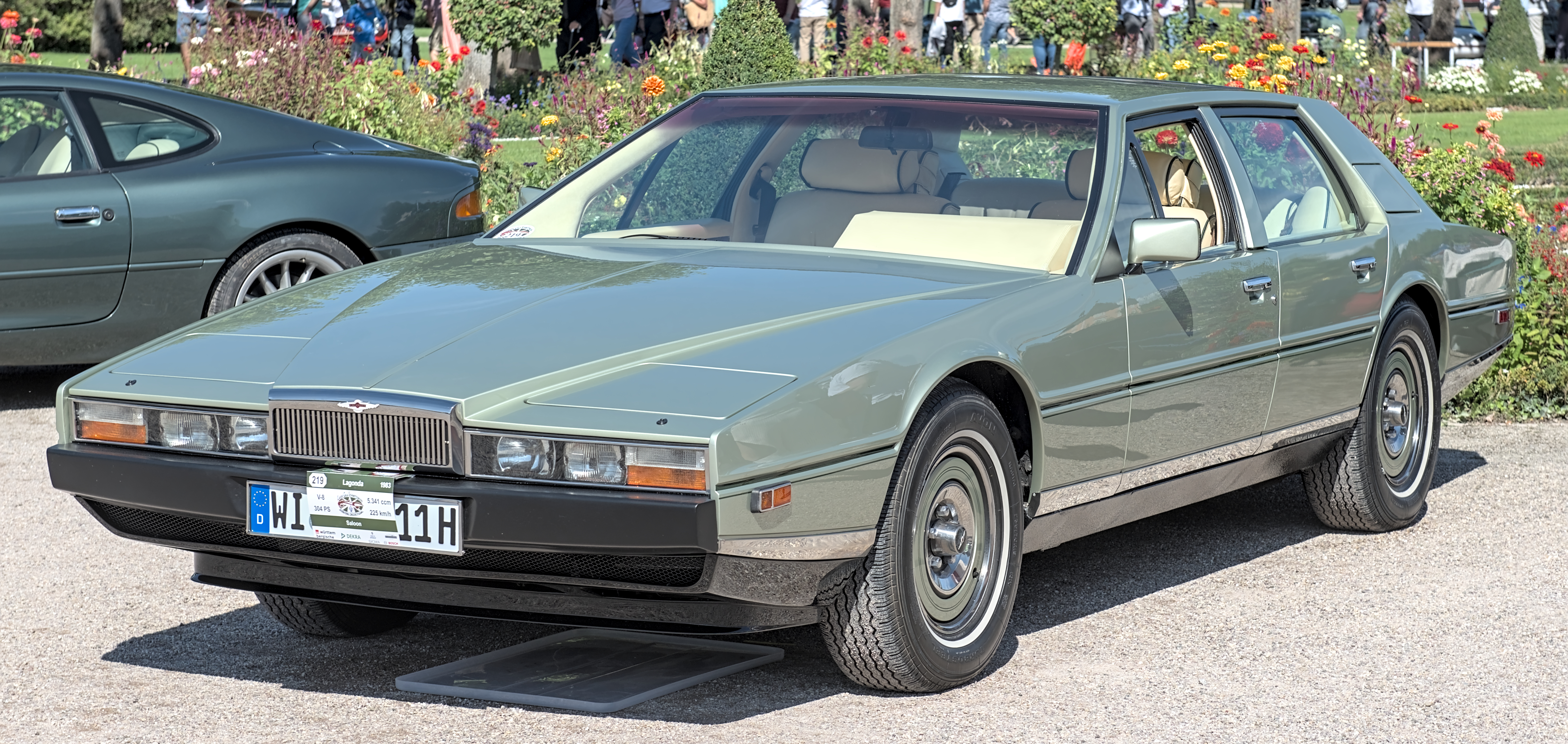
- Aston Martin Lagonda Series 2

Overview
- Manufacturer: Aston Martin
- Production: 1974–1990; 645 produced
- Assembly: United Kingdom: Newport Pagnell, Buckinghamshire, England
- Designer: William Towns

Body and chassis
- Class: Full-size luxury car (F)
- Body style: 4-door saloon
- Layout: Front-engine, rear-wheel-drive

Powertrain
- Engine: 5.3 L (5,340 cc) V8
- Transmission: 5-speed manual; 3-speed Torqueflite automatic

Dimensions
- Wheelbase: 2,916 mm (114.8 in)
- Length: 5,282 mm (208.0 in)
- Width: 1,816 mm (71.5 in)
- Height: 1,302 mm (51.3 in)

Chronology
- Predecessor: Lagonda Rapide
- Successor: Lagonda Taraf

The Aston Martin Lagonda is a full-size luxury four-door saloon manufactured by British manufacturer Aston Martin between 1974 and 1990. A total of 645 were produced. The name was derived from the Lagonda marque that Aston Martin had purchased in 1947. There are two distinct generations: the original, short-lived 1974 design based on a lengthened Aston Martin V8, and the entirely redesigned, wedge-shaped Series 2 model introduced in 1976.

In 2014, Aston Martin confirmed it would launch a new Lagonda model called the Taraf for the Middle-East market, sold on an invitation-only basis as a successor to this saloon. As of 2022, 113 remain registered in the United Kingdom, though 82 are SORN (unregistered for routine road use).

== History ==
Aston Martin was facing financial pressure in the mid-1970s and needed something to bring in some much-needed funds. Traditionally Aston Martin had worked on 2+2 sports cars but the Lagonda was a four-door saloon. As soon as it was introduced, it attracted hundreds of deposits and boosted Aston Martin's cash reserves.

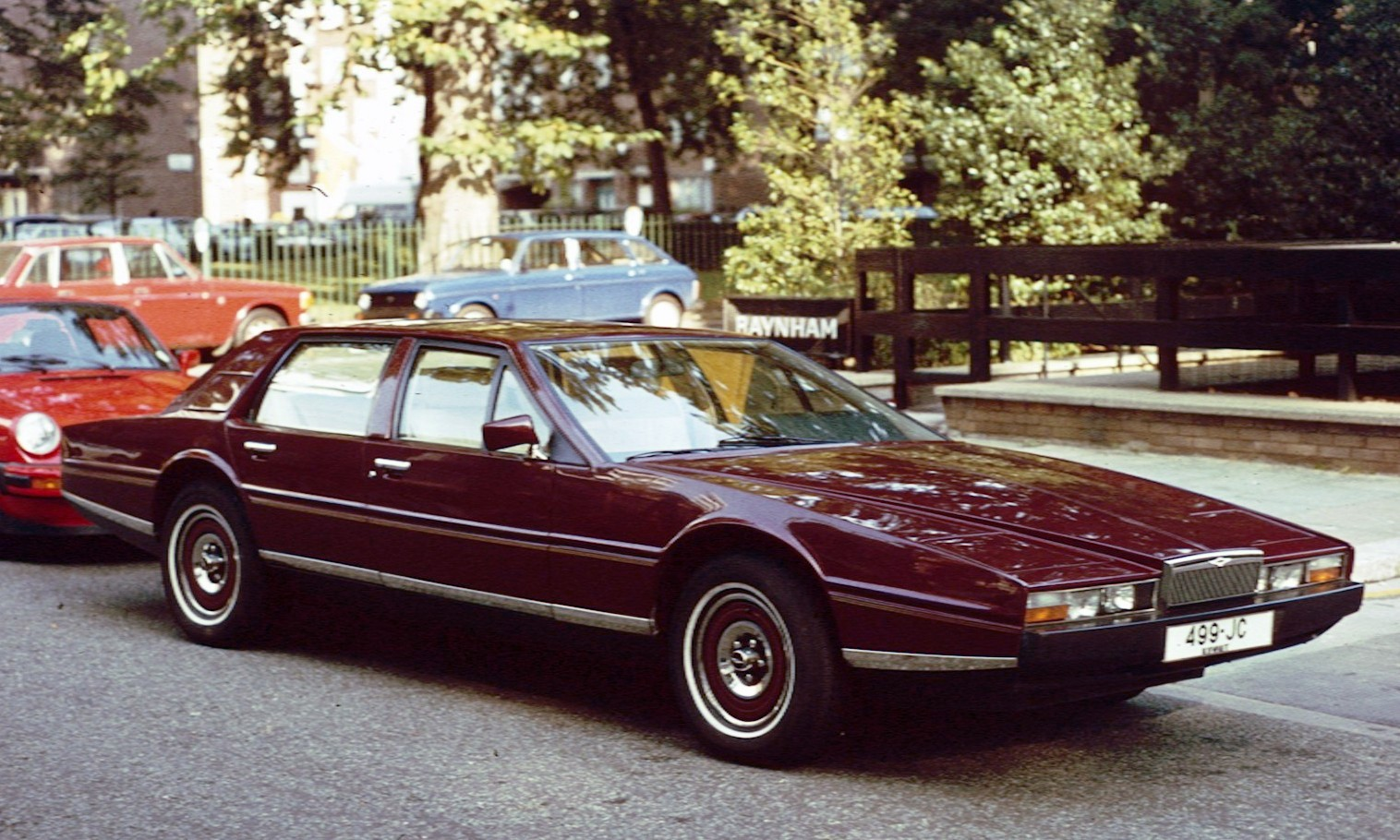
The 1976 wedge-shaped styling contrasted sharply with other cars of its day

After the production of seven Series 1 cars, the Lagonda was designed from the ground up in 1976 by William Towns as an extreme interpretation of the classic 1970s "folded paper" style. It was an unconventional design practice for the company. With famous contemporaries like the Lamborghini Countach, Lotus Esprit, and DMC DeLorean, the Lagonda is frequently named among the most striking wedge-shaped designs. The Lagonda combined striking styling with a premium leather interior and (for the day), advanced instrumentation. Coupled to a Chrysler three-speed "TorqueFlite" automatic transmission, its four-cam carbureted V8 provided poor fuel economy, measured between 12.4–12.5 mpg in contemporary road tests, affected little by the change to fuel injection in the Series 3.

Throughout the history of the marque, the hand-built Lagonda was amongst the most expensive luxury saloons in the world. The only other production cars to approach its price were the Rolls-Royce Silver Spirit/Silver Spur and the Bentley Mulsanne.

The Lagonda was the first production car to use a digital instrument panel. The development cost for the electronics alone on the Lagonda came to four times as much as the budget for the whole car. The Series 3 used cathode-ray tubes for the instrumentation, which proved even less reliable than the original model's light-emitting diode (LED) display.

It was named by Bloomberg Businessweek as one of the 50 ugliest cars of the last 50 years and Time magazine included it in its "50 Worst Cars of All Time", describing it as a mechanical "catastrophe" with electronics that would be impressive if they ever worked.

== Models ==
A number of iterations of the Lagonda were produced: the original Series 1 and the wedge-shaped Series 2, 3, and 4. A total of 645 cars were produced in its 12-year production run.

=== Series 1 (1974–1975) ===
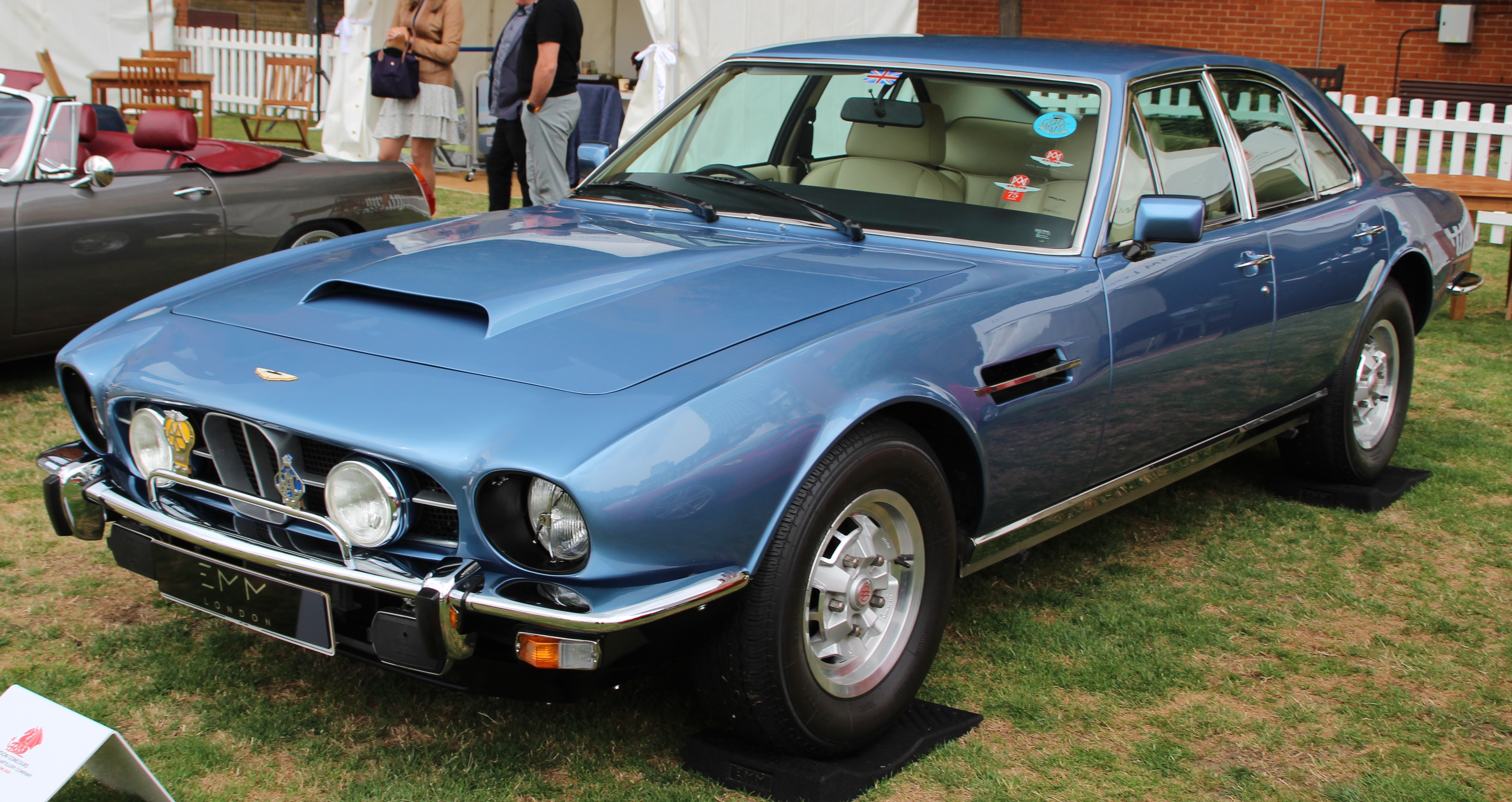
The 1st Series Lagonda was essentially just a four-door version of the Aston Martin V8

This long-wheelbase, four-door version of the Aston Martin V8 was announced at the 1974 London Motor Show. Designed by William Towns and based on the DBS, it was the first car to wear the Lagonda name since the 1961 Rapide. The 5.3 L V8 engine was supplied with either a 5-speed manual or automatic transmission. Only seven were sold.

==== Specifications (Series 1) ====
- Engine and power output: 5.3-L 5,340 cc (326 cu in) DOHC V8, 320 hp (239 kW; 324 PS), 350 lb⋅ft (475 N⋅m) of torque (estimated)
- Top speed: 240 km/h (149 mph)
- 0–97 km/h (0–60 mph): 6.2 seconds
- Length: 4,928 mm (194.0 in)
- Wheelbase: 2,910 mm (114.6 in)
- Width: 1,829 mm (72.0 in)
- Height: 1,323 mm (52.1 in)
- Weight: 2,000 kg (4,409 lb)

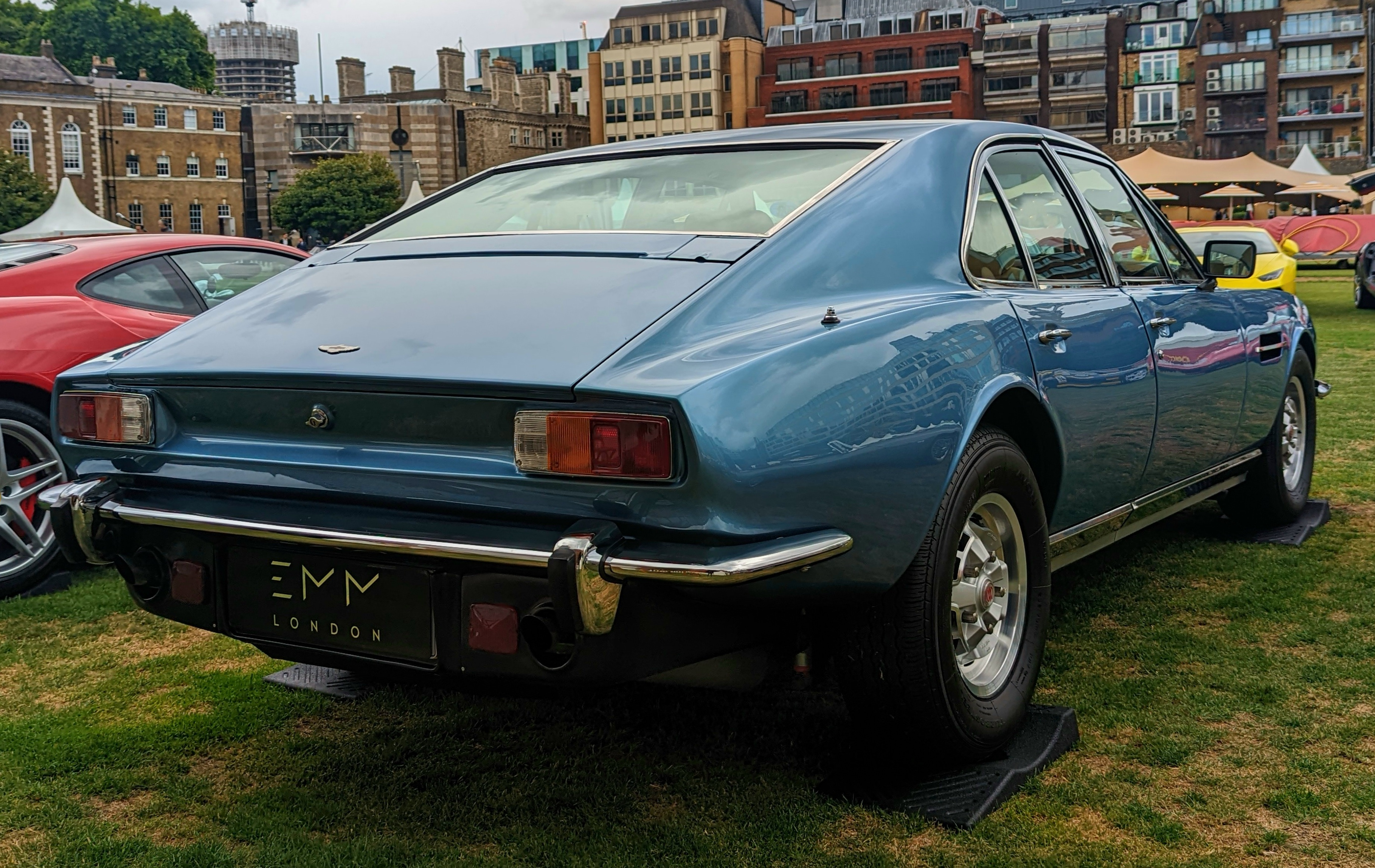
Series 1 Aston Martin Lagonda rear

At least two of the cars (having chassis numbers 12003 and 12005) have been upgraded by R.S. Williams Ltd of Cobham to a 7.0-litre version of the original engine, able to generate a power output ranging from 440 to 480 hp (328 to 358 kW) on unleaded fuel.

=== Series 2 (1976–1985) ===
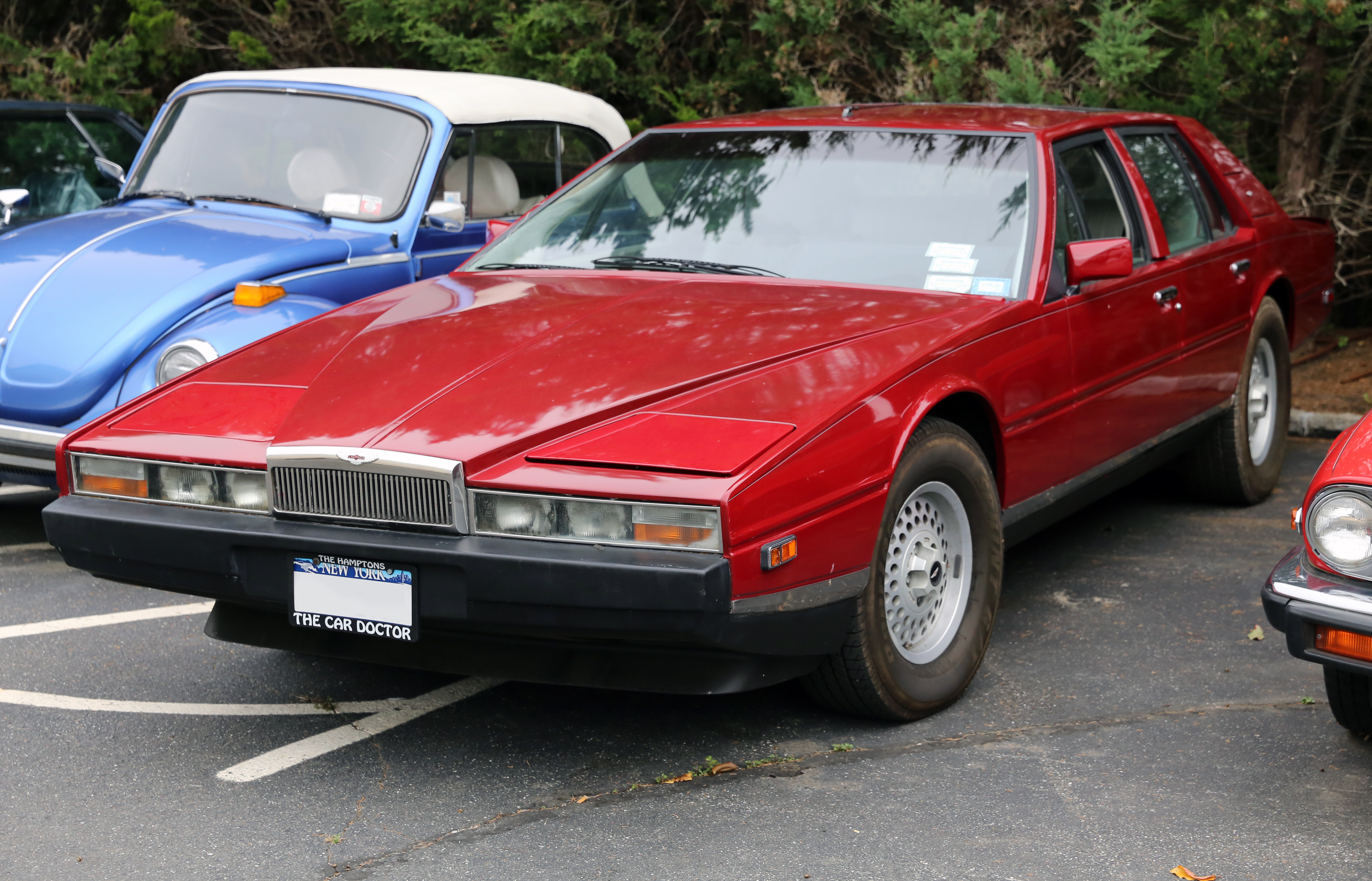
The Series 2 model has pop-up headlights and a design in-line with the folded paper wedged shaped trend of the 1970s

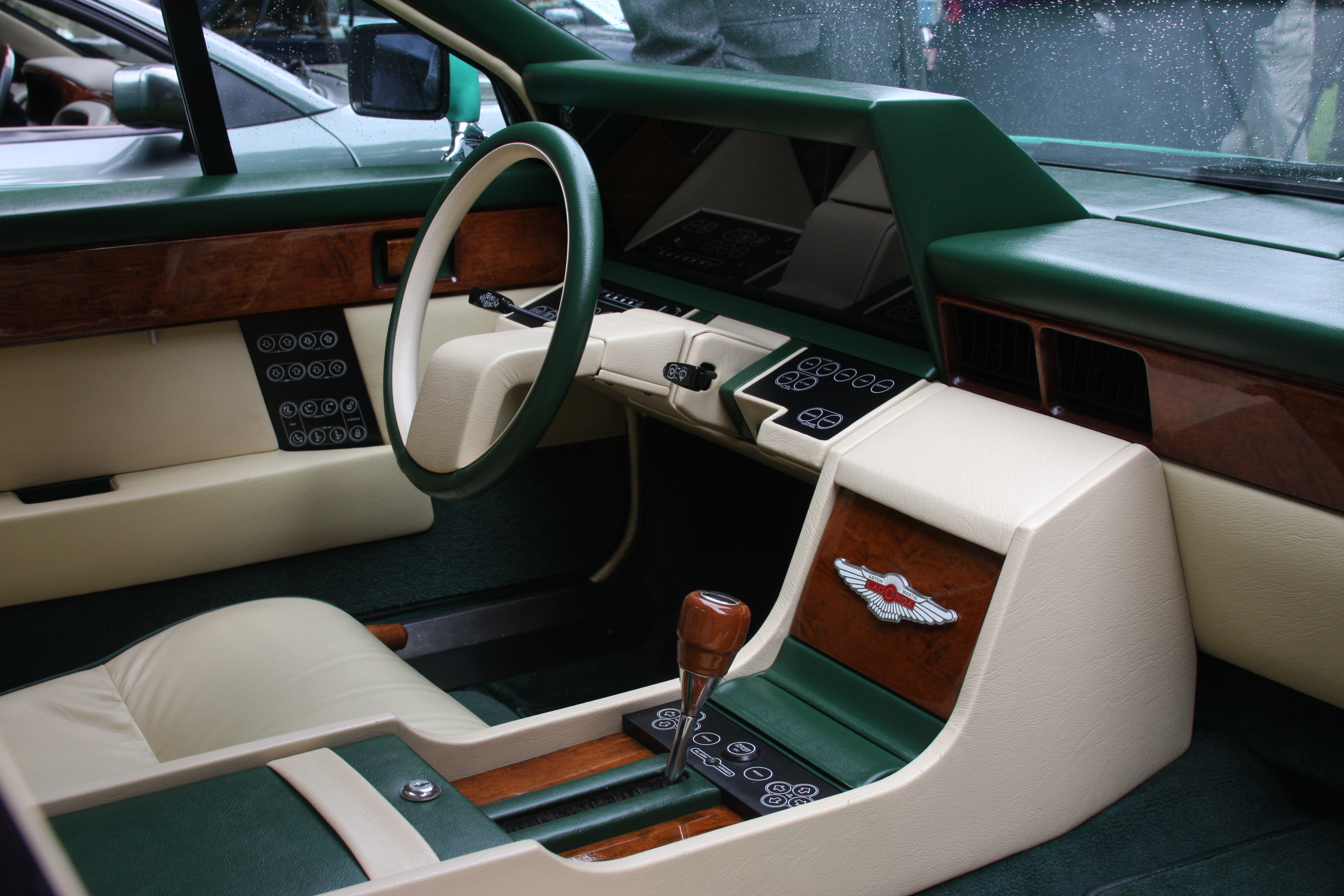
The interior of the Series 2 had a futuristic dashboard and controls

The wedge-shaped Lagonda V8 saloon was launched in 1976 at the London Motor Show and was a total contrast to the 1974 model, sharing little but the engine. Deliveries of the Lagonda did not commence until 1979. Series 2 cars were originally fitted with digital LCD dashboards and touch button controls but these features were abandoned in 1980. The Lagonda retailed at £49,933 in 1980, significantly more than a Ferrari 400 or Maserati Kyalami but less than a Rolls-Royce Corniche. The car commenced sales in the US from 1982 with minor regulatory amendments to the front bumper and airdam.

==== Specification (Series 2) ====
- Engine and power output: 5.3 L 5,340 cc (326 cu in) DOHC V8, 280 hp (209 kW; 284 PS) at 5,000 rpm, 360 lb⋅ft (488 N⋅m) of torque at 3,000 rpm
- Top speed: 238 km/h (148 mph)
- 0–97 km/h (0–60 mph): 7.9 seconds (Official time)
- 0–97 km/h (0–60 mph): 8.9 seconds (Road & Track 1982 test)
- 0–161 km/h (0–100 mph): 24.8 seconds (Road & Track 1982 test)
- Length: 5,281 mm (207.9 in)
- Wheelbase: 2,916 mm (114.8 in)
- Width: 1,791 mm (70.5 in)
- Height: 1,302 mm (51.3 in)
- Weight: 2,023 kg (4,460 lb)

=== Series 3 (1986–1987) ===
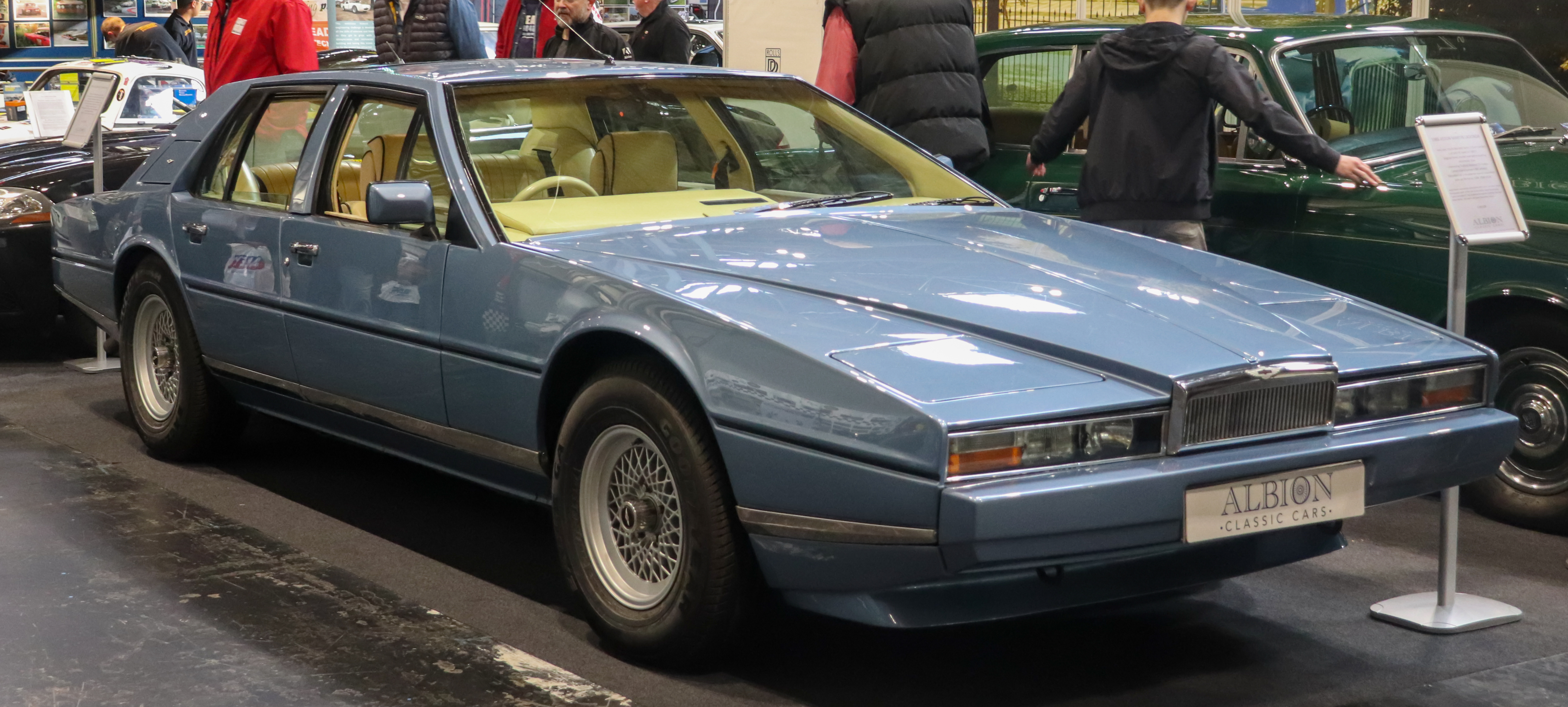
1986 Aston Martin Lagonda Series 3

The Series 3 was produced for only one year with 75 units manufactured. All had fuel injected engines. Cathode-ray tube instrumentation was later changed to a vacuum fluorescent display system and shared exterior styling with the Series 2.

=== Series 4 (1987–1990) ===
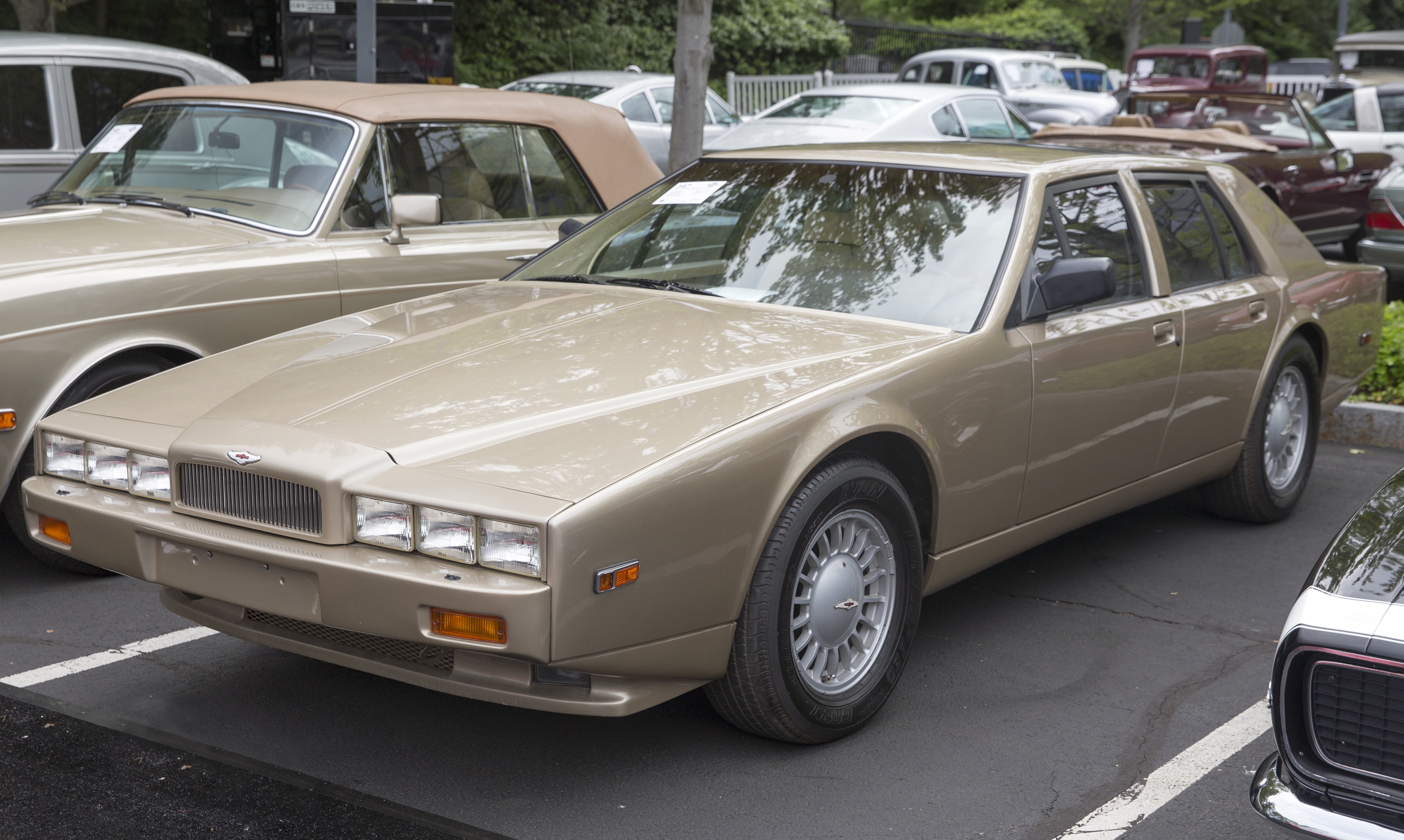
The 1987 Series 4 had more rounded, but also more slab-sided styling.

The Series 4 was launched at the Geneva Motor Show in March 1987, having been extensively restyled by the car's original designer William Towns. Sharp edges were rounded off and the pop-up headlights were replaced with three headlights on each side of the grille. The side swage line (or character line) was removed and 16-inch wheels were introduced. With production of around one car per week, 105 cars were manufactured through January 1990. 72 of the Series 4 cars were built with left-hand drive.

=== Special variants ===
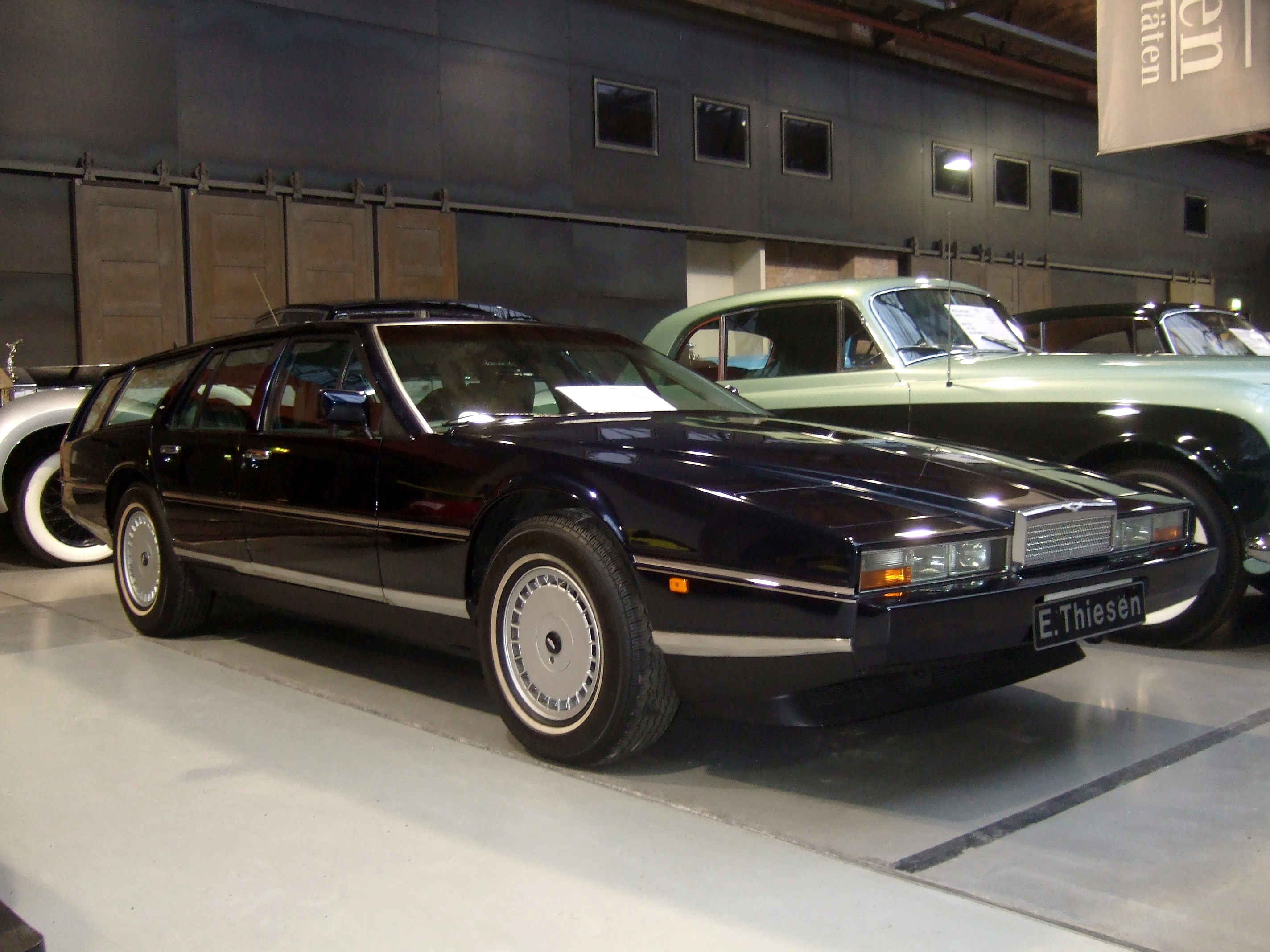

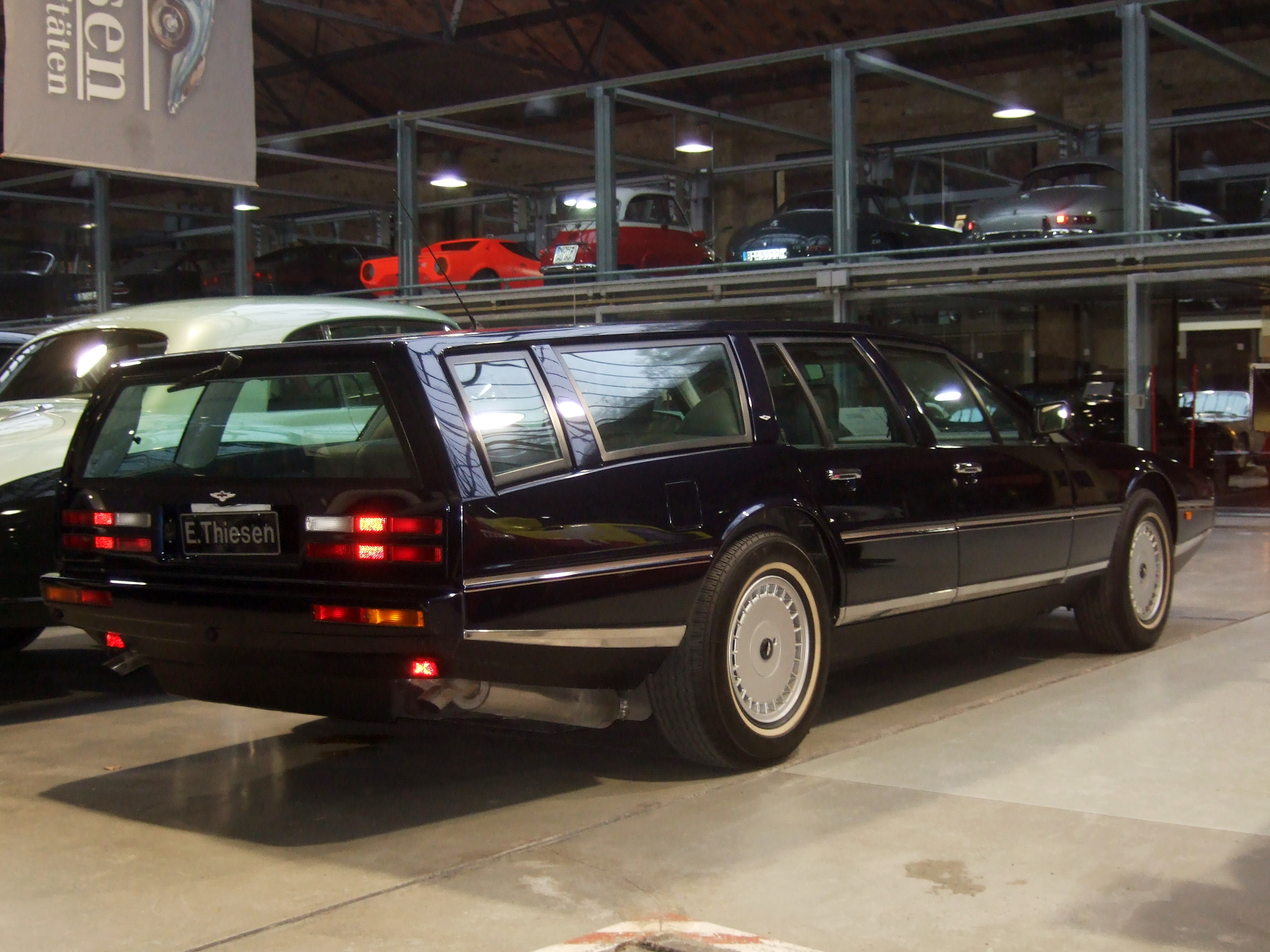
1987/1998 Roos Engineering shooting-brake Lagonda

Aftermarket variations of the Lagonda included:

- Tickford Lagonda (1983) – Five Series 2 Lagondas were sold with a bodykit and upgraded interiors.
- Tickford limousine (1984) – Four long-wheelbase Lagondas were made, at a cost of £110,000 each. On these cars, the rear door window glass was split vertically in half.
- Rapide (a two-door, short-wheelbase version) – one made with the front triple headlight design of the Series 4.
- Shooting-brake (Estate) by Swiss company Roos Engineering – one made in 1998 using a 1987 model.
- Lagonda Vantage – a 1985 Lagonda with Vantage engine for an Indian Londoner.
