= Peel Engineering Company =

Engineering company

Peel Engineering Limited
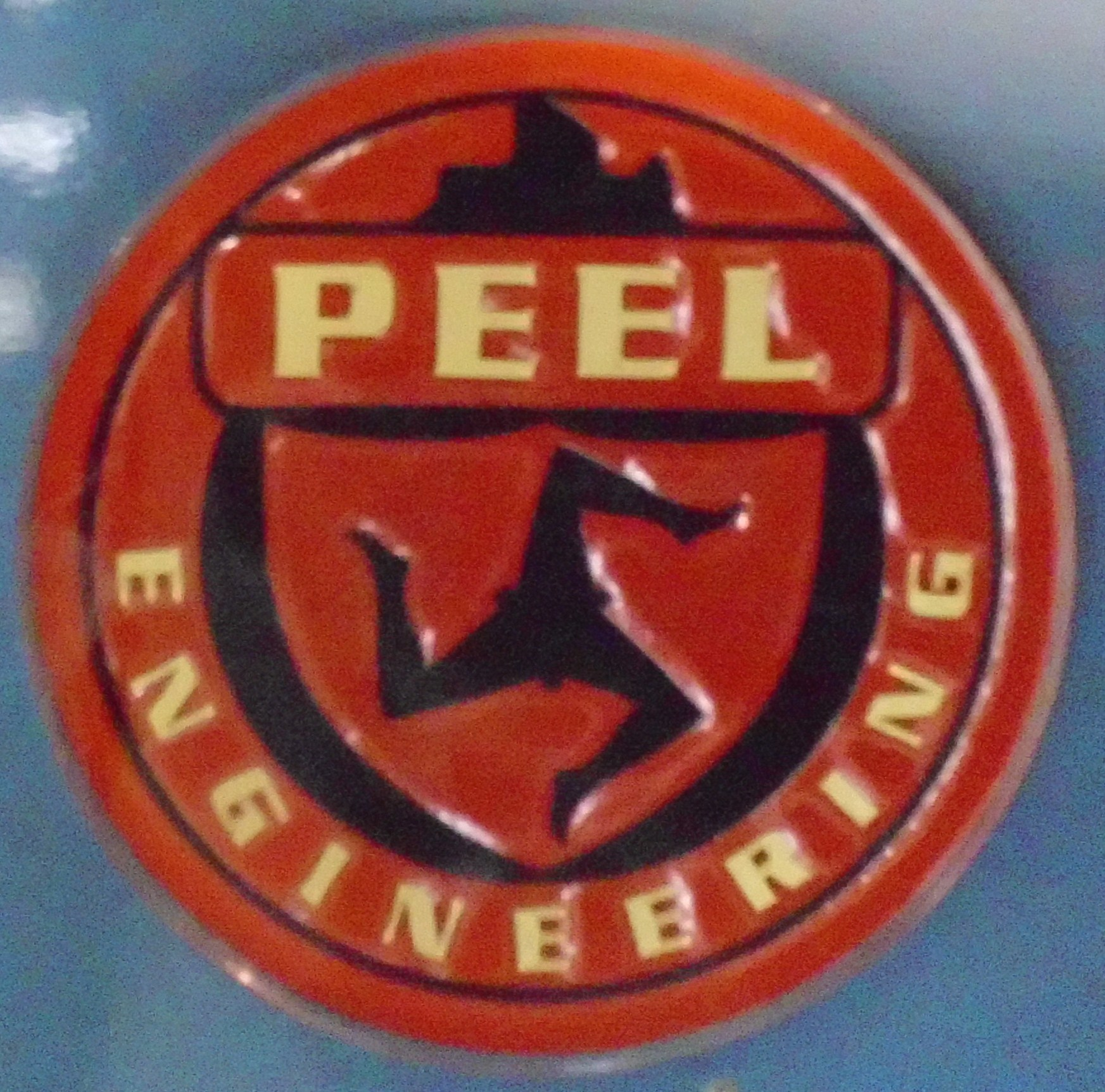
- Company type: Limited Company
- Industry: Vehicles
- Founded: Late 1940s
- Defunct: 1974
- Headquarters: Peel, Isle of Man
- Key people: Cyril Cannell; Alice Victoria Maud Cannell

The Peel Engineering Company was a manufacturing company based in Peel on the west coast of the Isle of Man that primarily made fibreglass boats through its subsidiary company West Marine Ltd. and fairings for motorcycles.

== History ==
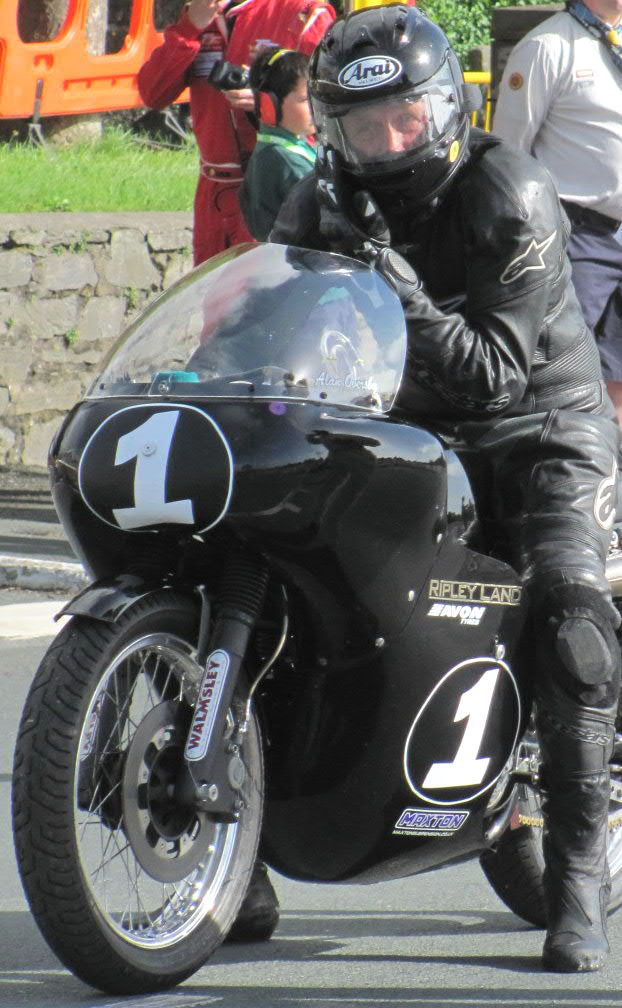
A modern racing classic-category motorcycle with a Peel-type fairing having enclosed handlebar ends

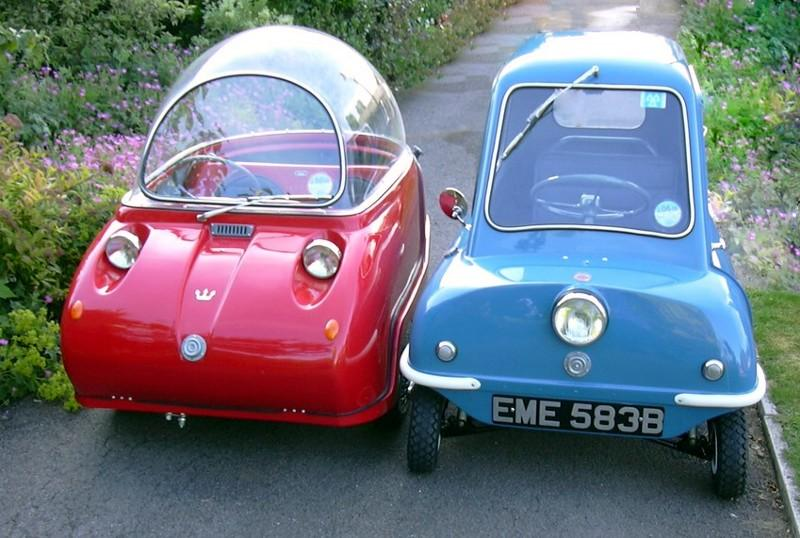
A red Peel Trident and a blue Peel P50

Cyril Cannell founded the Peel Engineering Company in Peel in the late 1940s. At first he mainly manufactured GRP fairings for motorcycles and cars. The sports fairings were recognisable for their styling with integral 'blisters' enclosing the handlebar-ends and rider's hands, and were available for racing, named Mountain Mile, with a similar sports-style for road use incorporating a distinctive, large rectangular Cibié headlamp, named Peel 707. A different design was for touring, aptly named TT Tourer. In 1955 Cannell built the first Peel microcar - the Manxcar. The company also built an experimental hovercraft design in 1961 powered by a 500cc Triumph engine.

On 31 December 1964 the company was renamed Peel Engineering Limited. The original company was dissolved on January 8, 1965. The directors were Cyril Cannell and George Henry Kissack. In 1965, the former directors arranged for all fairing production to be transferred under licence to Mike Ivory of Luton, Bedfordshire, England. Prototype and development work continued on the Isle of Man.

Over the course of its history, Peel Engineering developed the Peel Manxcar concept vehicle, the Peel P-1000 4-wheeled microcar, the Peel P50 and the Peel Trident 3-wheeled microcars, in addition to the Peel Viking Sport and prototype GRP Minis for BMC. These models constitute the only automobiles manufactured on the Isle of Man. A limited-run Peel Manxkart go-kart was also produced. The Peel P50 is in the Guinness Book Of World Records as the world's smallest production car.

In 1966 Peel stopped producing cars, concentrating again on motorcycle fairings and – under the name West Marine Ltd. – on the construction of fiberglass boats, especially small fishing boats with outboard motors such as the Peel Inshoreman 18.

After the death of George Henry Kissack on 16 March 1972, his widow Eileen May Kissack became director on 3 November 1972. She resigned from the post on 25 November 1973 and was replaced by Alice Victoria Maud Cannell on 30 November 1973. On 10 May 1974, the owners decided to dissolve the company, which was then carried out on 29 August 1974.

=== Further use of the name Peel and replicas ===
In August 2010, it was announced that two British entrepreneurs, Gary Hillman and Faizal Khan from Peel Engineering in Sidcup, founded in 2008, were rebuilding the P50 almost to its original state. Instead of the 45cc petrol engine used at the time, an electric motor now drives the single rear wheel. The new edition, which will only be produced in 50 units, will also have a reverse gear. The price of the car per unit will be around €15,300.

Arthur Alan Evans also produces replicas of the Peel P50 through his Gainsborough-based company - Bambycars, which he founded in 2011.

== See also ==
- List of car manufacturers of the United Kingdom
- List of microcars
