= Peel Manxcar =

Overview
- Manufacturer: Peel Engineering Company

Body and chassis
- Class: Microcar; Saloon
- Related: Peel P50, Peel Trident, Peel Viking Sport

Powertrain
- Engine: Anzani 250 cc

Dimensions
- Wheelbase: 170 cm (66.9 in)
- Length: 228 cm (89.8 in)
- Width: 130 cm (51.2 in)
- Height: 130 cm (51.2 in)

Chronology
- Predecessor: Peel P1000
- Successor: Peel P50

The Peel Manxcar was a prototype 2+2 seater saloon car designed by Cyril Cannell and Henry Kissack and manufactured in 1955 by the Manx Peel Engineering Company. The projected purchase price of the assembled Manxcar was "....ten shillings short of £300, including purchase tax." Initially renamed from "Peel Manxman" because of the Excelsior (Coventry) motorbike of the same name, the Manxcar never entered standard production.
