= E. C. B. Corlett =

Reverend Dr Ewan Christian Brew Corlett, OBE, FREng (11 February 1923 – August 2005) was a British author, naval architect and consultant. He was pivotal to the restoration of the SS Great Britain from a sandbank in the Falklands, to Bristol. He also wrote several papers on the subject of naval architecture and books on the SS Great Britain.

He was educated at King William's College, Isle of Man. He then went on to read engineering science at Queen's College, Oxford, from 1941 to 1944 before working for the Naval Construction Department of the Admiralty. After the war he did a PhD in naval architecture at Durham University. From 1952 onwards he was with Burness, Corlett & Partners, Naval Architects and Marine Consultants.

In 1967 he wrote a letter to The Times stating that the historic ship SS Great Britain, was lying abandoned in the Falklands, and should be restored if possible. From his letter great support was created to survey and restore the ship.

In 1974 Corlett was appointed a trustee of the National Maritime Museum at Greenwich. He was then subsequently made OBE, a Fellow of the Royal Academy of Engineering. He was also an honorary member of the Institute of Navigation and a member of the Royal Astronomical Society.

In 1990 he was a member of the Board of Inquiry into the Herald of Free Enterprise disaster.

He designed such boats as the West Marine Ltd. (Peel Engineering) Midshoreman and Offshoreman.
