= Minisport =

Minisport may refer to:

- Mini Classic Cooper Sport, a Mini car model produced up to 2000
- Mini sport utility vehicle a.k.a. Mini SUV, a class of small sport utility vehicles
- Ministry of Sport (Russia), the federal sport ministry in Russia since 2008
- Spacek SD-1 Minisport, a Czech amateur-built aircraft design
- Viking Minisport, a car of the 1970s
- Zenith MinisPort, an early CP/M laptop computer introduced by ZDS in 1989
