= Peel P50 =

Three-wheeled automobile

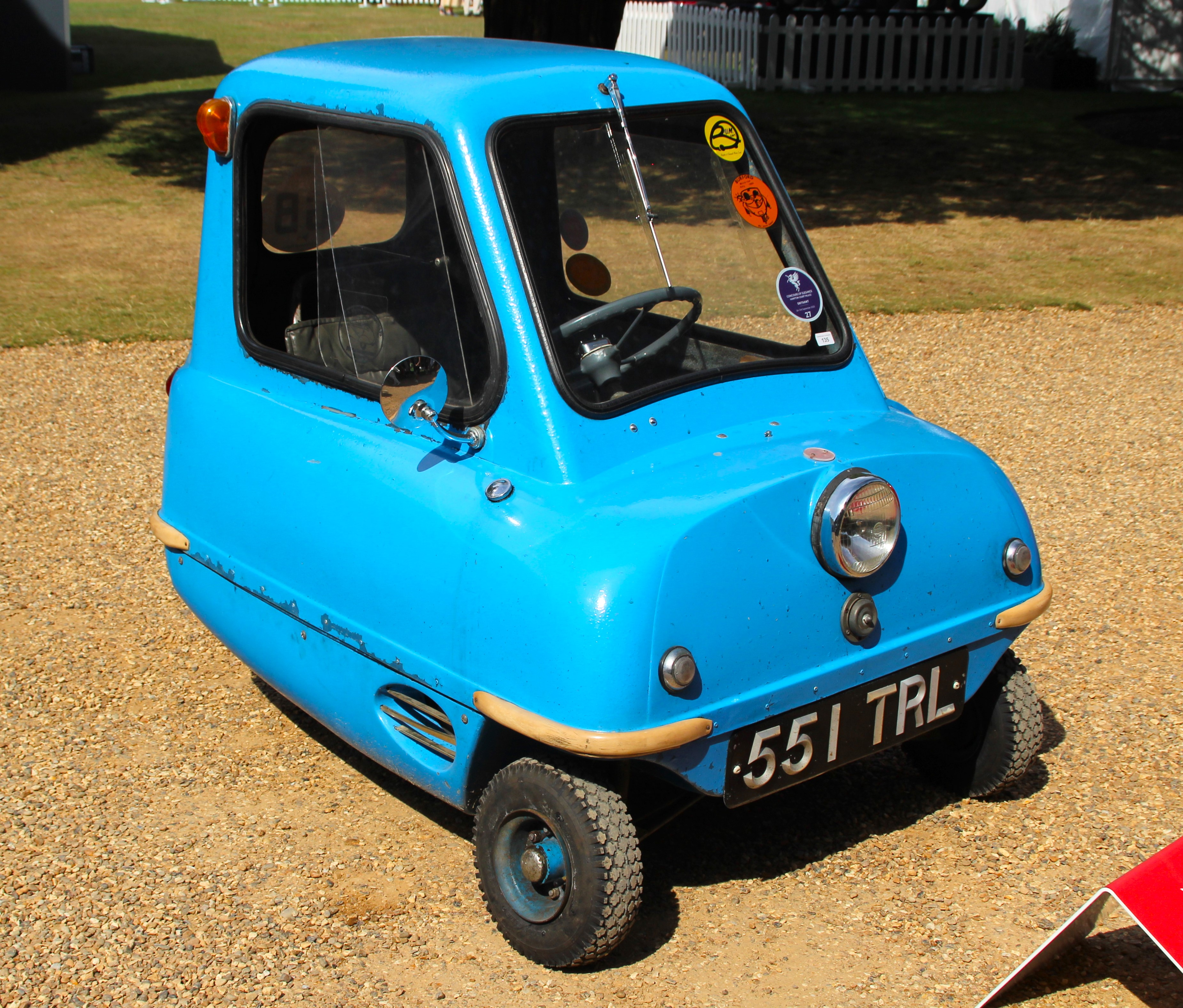

Overview
- Manufacturer: Peel Engineering Company and Peel Engineering Ltd. (UK-based)
- Production: 1962–1965; 2010–present (EV); 2011–present (Petrol)(Gas)
- Assembly: Peel, Isle of Man (1962–1965); Sutton-in-Ashfield, England (2010–present)
- Designer: Cyril Cannell

Body and chassis
- Class: Microcar
- Body style: 1 -door coupé
- Layout: Side engine, rear wheel drive
- Related: Peel Trident, Peel Viking Sport, Peel Manxcar

Powertrain
- Engine: 1963–1964: DKW 49 cubic centimetres (3.0 cu in; 0.049 L), 4.2 brake horsepower (4.3 PS; 3.1 kW) single-cylinder, fan-cooled (top speed: 61 km/h (38 mph); 2011 Petrol : 49 cubic centimetres (3.0 cu in; 0.049 L), 2.5 kilowatts (3.4 PS; 3.4 bhp), four-stroke engine; 2011 Electric: 2.3 kilowatts (3.1 PS; 3.1 bhp) brushless DC electric motor
- Transmission: 1963–1964: 3-speed manual; no reverse; 2010 EV: Single fixed gear ratio; 2011 Petrol & Electric: Continuously variable transmission

Dimensions
- Wheelbase: 1,200 mm (47.2 in)
- Length: 1,370 mm (53.9 in)
- Width: 1,040 mm (40.9 in)
- Height: 1,220 mm (48.0 in)
- Curb weight: 1963-1964: 59 kilograms (130 lb); 2010 EV: 105 kilograms (231 lb); 2011 Petrol & Electric: 98 kilograms (216 lb)

Chronology
- Predecessor: Peel Manxcar
- Successor: Peel Trident

The Peel P50 is a three-wheeled microcar originally made from 1962 to 1965 by the Peel Engineering Company on the Isle of Man, and then from 2010 to present. It was listed in the 2010 Guinness World Records as the smallest production car ever made. The original model has no reverse gear, but a handle at the rear allows the very lightweight car to be maneuvered physically when required.

Designed as a city car, it was advertised in the 1960s as capable of seating "one adult and a shopping bag." The vehicle's only door was on its left side and equipment included a single windscreen wiper and one headlight. Standard colours were Daytona White, Dragon Red, and Dark Blue. The 1963 model retailed for £199 when new (about £3635 today). The company produced 50 P50s, of which 27 are known to still exist, one of which was sold for a record US$176,000 at a Sotheby's auction in March 2016.

In 2010 Peel Engineering Ltd. in England reinstated manufacturing of the P50 and Trident models from its premises in Sutton-in-Ashfield, England. Externally this car is very similar to the original, with the same dimensions and kerb weight as the original, but with mechanical differences in the suspension, steering, and drive-train, and a fully functioning reverse gear, ensuring they are road-legal under modern-day laws. Production included petrol models with a 49 cc four-stroke engine and electric models with an electric moped motor and gelled-electrolyte batteries. The top speed of both cars is about 28 mph (45 km/h).

== Statistics and History ==
At 54 in (137 cm) long and 39 in (99 cm) wide and with an unladen weight of 130 pounds (59 kg), as of 2021 the P50 holds the record as the smallest car ever to go into production. The Peel P50's diminutive size and width means that it can quite easily fit through doorways and enter buildings, as demonstrated by Jeremy Clarkson where, during a 2007 episode of Top Gear, he drove a blue P50 through the BBC's Television Centre. He later proceeded to create the P45, a 1 seater car smaller than the original P50 model. However, his invention never made it into production or in the World Guinness Book of Records, even though it was fully street legal and qualified as a car, with four wheels.

=== 1962–1965 ===
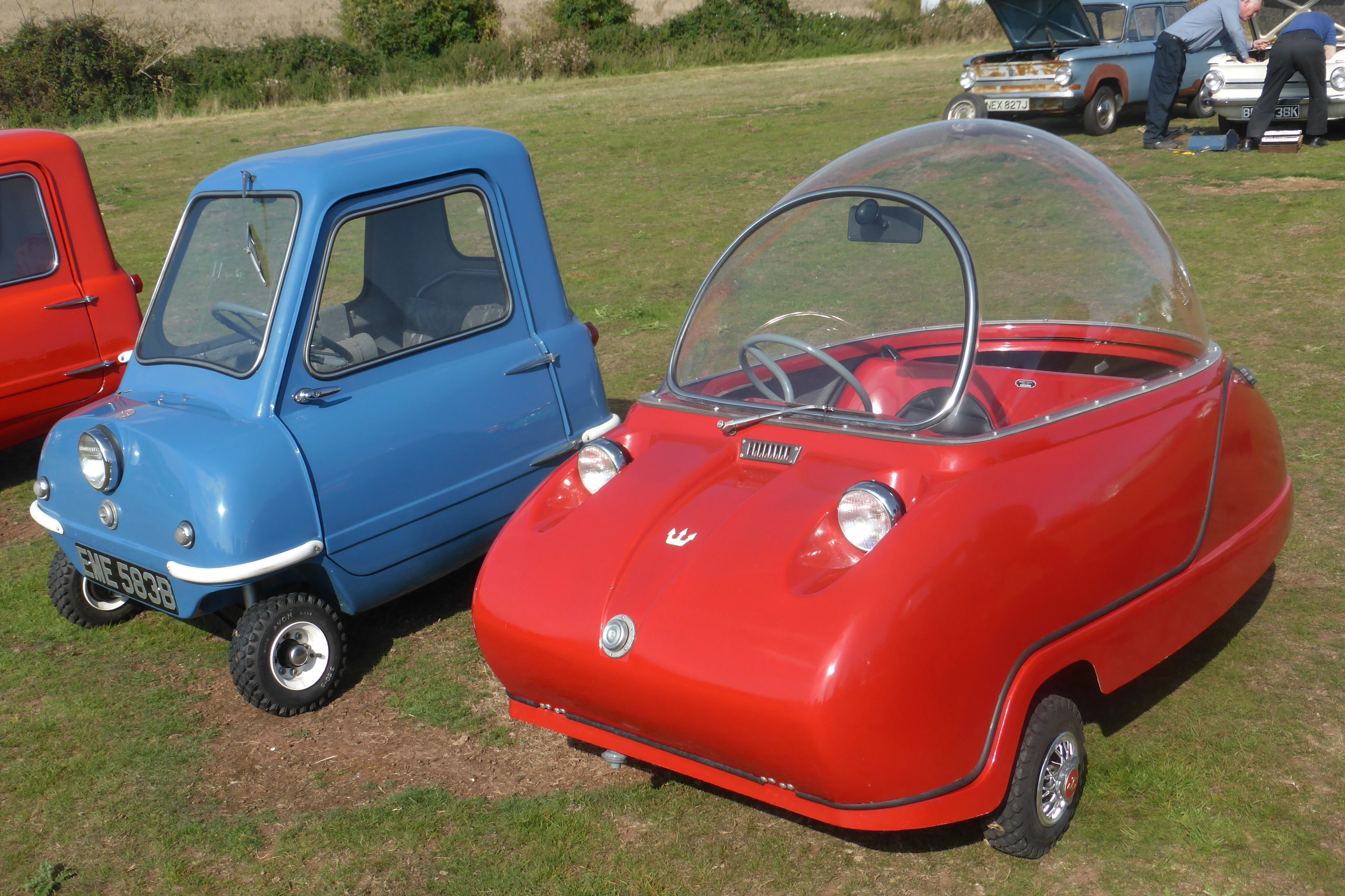
Peel P50 next to its successor, the Peel Trident

The original P50 used a 3 cu in (49.2 cc) DKW single-cylinder engine, which gave it a top speed of approximately 61 km/h (38 mph), and was equipped with a three-speed manual transmission that had no reverse. Consequently, turning in a confined area could be achieved only by pushing, or lifting the car using the handle on the rear and physically pulling it round. The makers and users claim fuel consumption of 100 mpg_{‑imp} (2.8 L/100 km; 83 mpg_{‑US}).

In 1963, as a publicity stunt, a Peel P50 was taken to the top of Blackpool Tower in the lift and driven around the observation balcony.

At least one prototype, the Peel P55 Saloon Scooter, has also survived. Unlike the production Peel P50 (along with all developments and replicas thereof), this prototype used the less stable layout of a single wheel at the front and two at the back.

Approximately 47 Peel P50s were sold at £299 each.

On 15 February 2013 at the Bruce Weiner RM Auction a genuine 1964 Peel P50 (Registration number ARX 37B) achieved in excess of US$120,000 (£80,000).

=== Top Gear review ===
Jeremy Clarkson reviewed the Peel P50 in season 10 episode 3 (2007) of Top Gear. Clarkson, who is 6 ft 5 in (1.96 m) tall, drove a blue P50 across London and inside the BBC building, showing that the P50 could fit inside corridors and even in an elevator. In his review, Clarkson described the P50 as a car "perfect ... for the roads of today" given its reduced size, low fuel consumption, and overall cheapness, also commenting that "[it] was introduced as almost cheaper than walking". Despite it lacking a reverse gear, he called it "the future" and "absolutely brilliant".

=== Since 2011 ===
In 2011 businessmen Gary Hillman and Faizal Khan went to the Dragons' Den asking for £80,000. They got the investment and started a new company to put their revised models into production. Three replica models were available initially: Gas, Eco and Fun. The line was later reduced to two: the Petrol and Electric models. These are hand-built to order in Sutton-in-Ashfield by Micro Car Specialists for the domestic and export markets.

In 2018 it was reported that Peel Engineering sells around fifteen P50s annually, plus ten or so continuations of its bigger sister, the two-seat bubblecar Peel Trident. The conventional piston engined P50 is more requested in the UK, priced at £14,879 – whereas greater demand for the Peel comes from the US, where the electric model (at £13,679) helps owners to comply with emissions regulations.

== Legal status ==
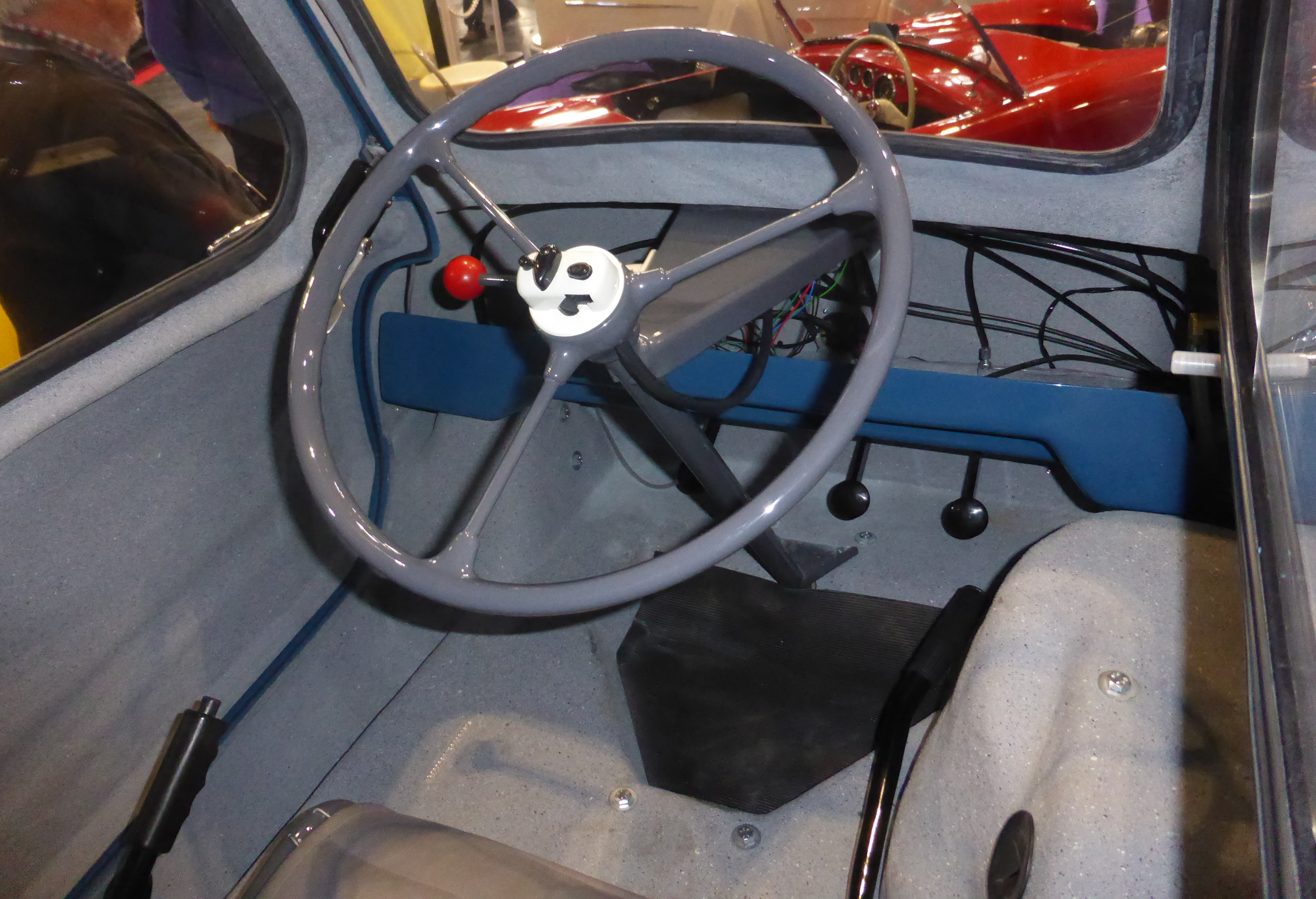
Peel P50 interior

The original Peel P50 has always been road-legal in the UK, though the many replica versions are classed as kit cars and as such, require MSVA inspection in the 3-wheel moped or 4-wheel quadricycle categories. Original examples are street-legal in the US. Cars were exported to other countries, sometimes being classified as a moped (e.g. the P50 that went to Finland). In the Netherlands there are two original Peel Tridents registered as motorized tricycles, but the Trident replica with the 50 cc engine and 59 km/h (37 mph) top speed was registered as a moped. In Amsterdam the Ripley's Believe It Or Not museum has one. Due to local traffic rules it may not be driven on the cycle path. In Wassenaar the Louwman Museum had an original P50 on display; it was on the poster of the "Dwarfcar" themed exhibition.

== See also ==
- Commuter Cars Tango
- BMW Isetta
- List of microcars by country of origin
- Reliant Robin
- Smart Fortwo
- Peel Trident
