= Kleinschnittger =

Former german car manufacturer

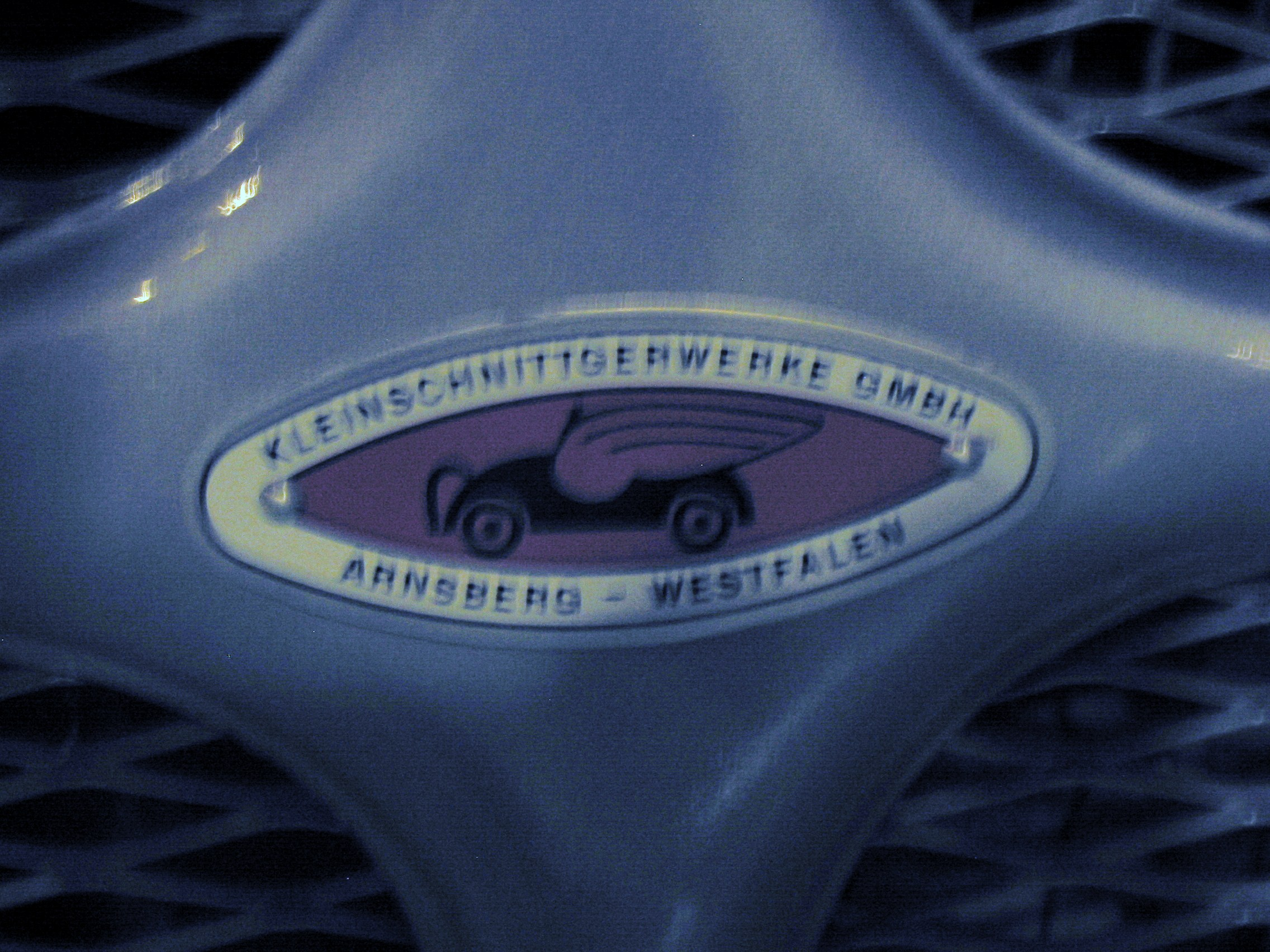
Logo of Kleinschnittger

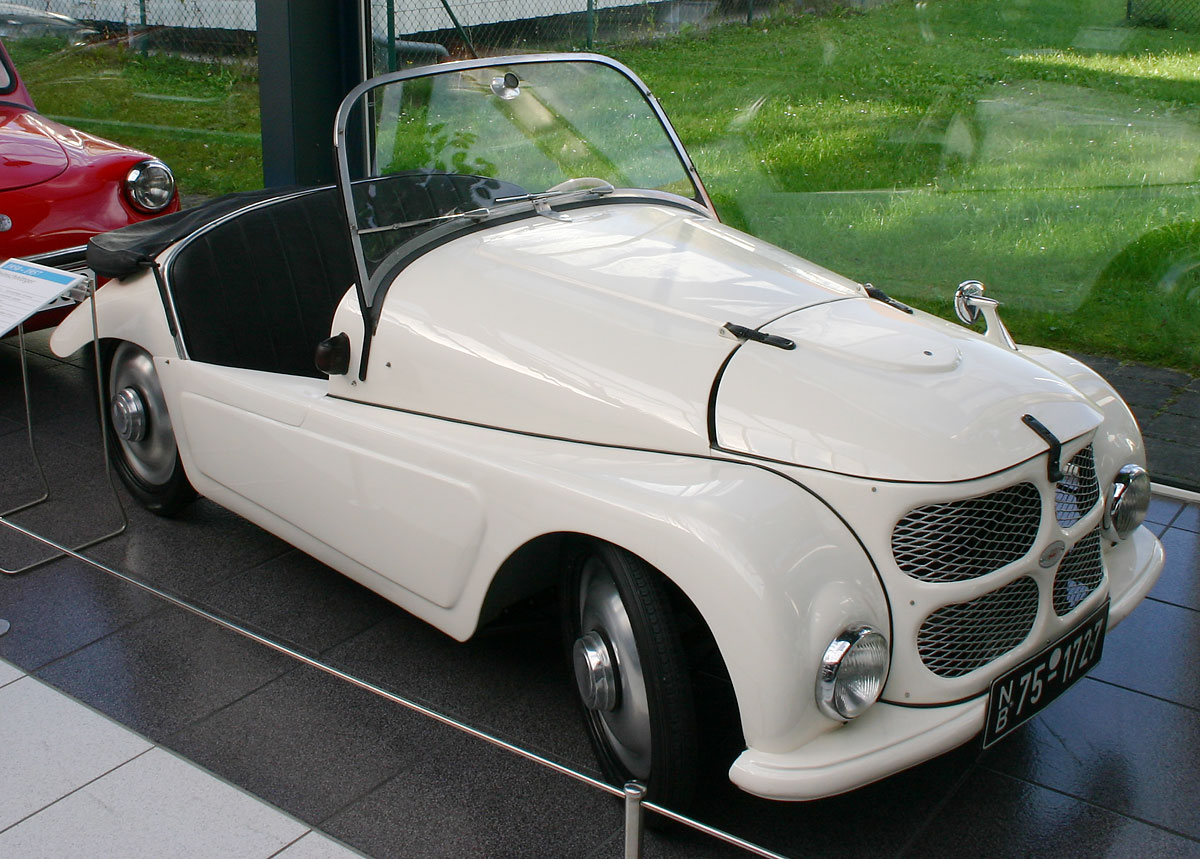
Kleinschnittger F125

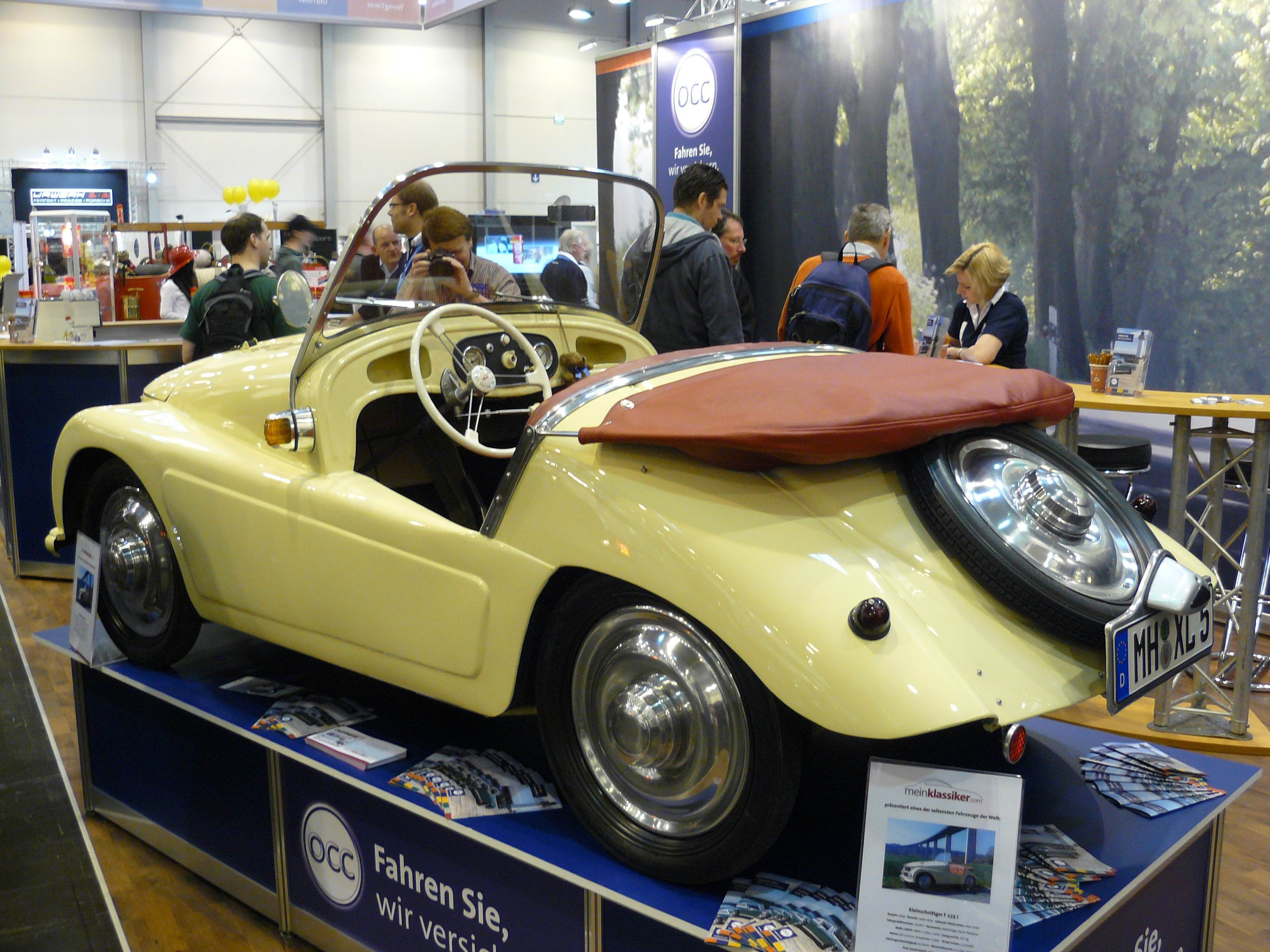
Kleinschnittger F125 1954

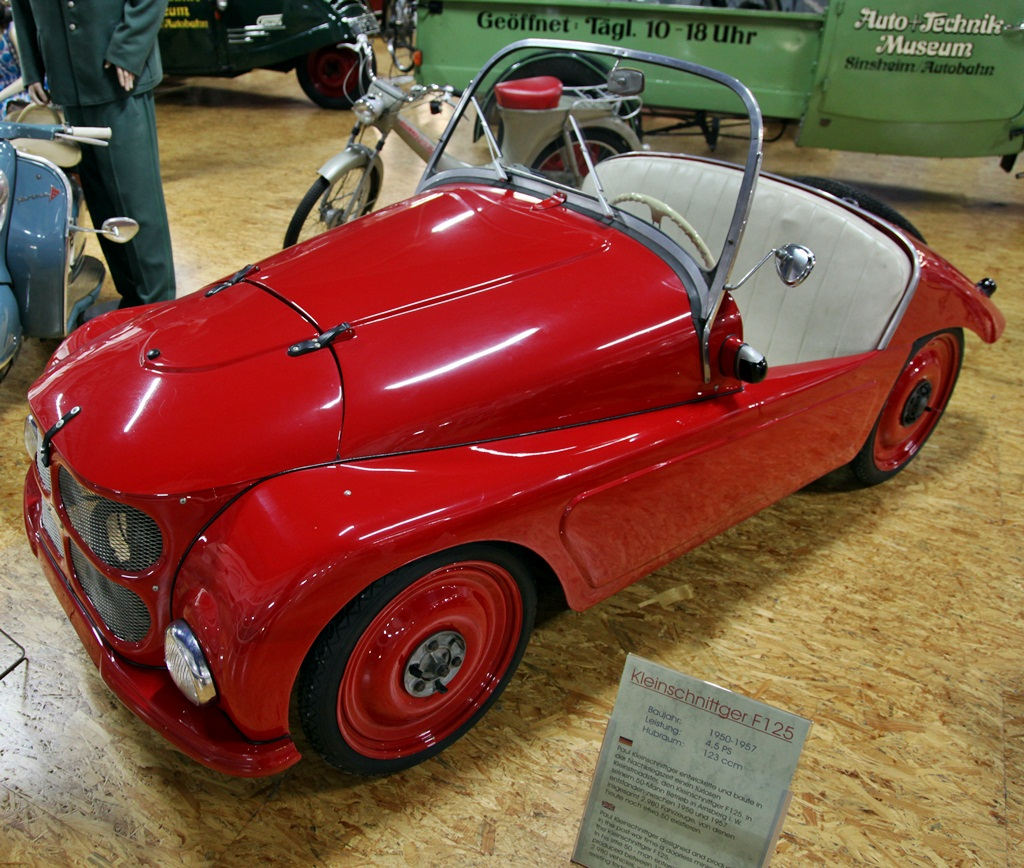
Kleinschnittger F125

Kleinschnittger was a German company that produced microcars between 1950 and 1957.

Paul Kleinschnittger had already developed a small light vehicle in 1933 in Ladelund in Schleswig-Holstein, which was equipped with a 98cc DKW engine. In the village museum, memorabilia of the developer KLEINSCHNITTGER can still be found today. However, this model was not suitable for series production. A new design with aluminium body, which was screwed onto a lightweight central tube frame, was then put into series production in Arnsberg in the Hochsauerlandkreis. The Kleinschnittger F125 was started like a lawnmower with a cable pull. There was no reverse gear, it was lifted at the back and turned around. Their most common car, with 1992 examples produced, was powered by a 125 cc single cylinder two-stroke engine that produced 5.5 hp (4.1 kW) and had a top speed of 70 km/h (43 mph). The body was made of aluminium. It was quite fuel efficient and consumed roughly 2.5 litres per 100 km (94 miles per gallon). The vehicle was 2650 mm long, 1150 mm wide and 1200 mm high. The wheelbase was 1700 mm, the track width 980 mm. The ground clearance was 165 mm. The curb weight was 135 kg. The transmission had three gears and was operated via a steering wheel shift.

Kleinschnittger also produced the F250, which was fitted with a 250 cc engine from ILO-Motorenwerke giving 15 hp (11.2 kW). It consumed roughly 4 litres per 100 km (58.8 miles per gallon). 22 examples were produced.

It is alleged that it was also made in Belgium under the name Kleinstwagen and in the Netherlands as the Alco.
