= Hackney (automobile) =

American motor vehicle

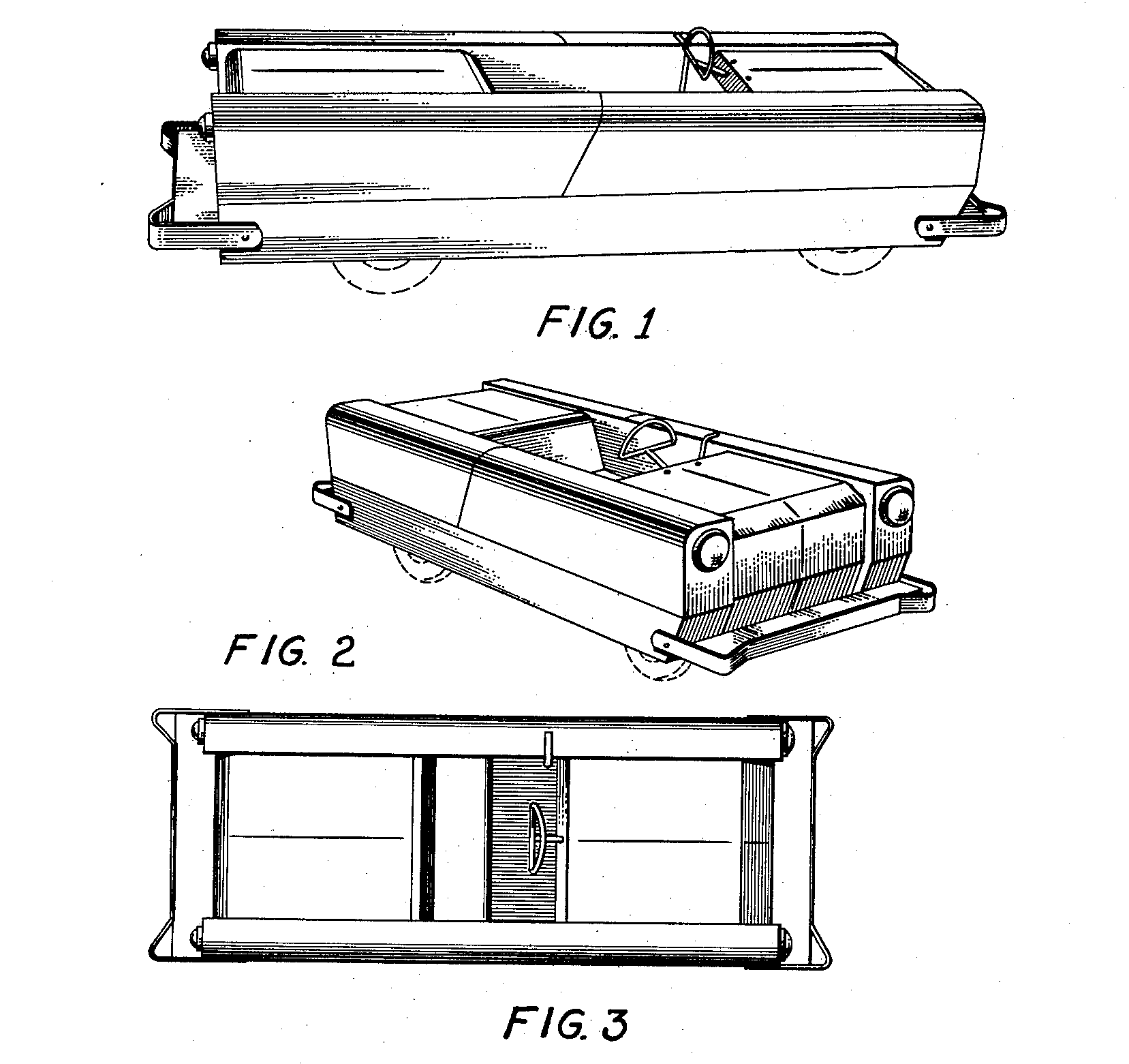
Hackney Miniature Car, United States Patent Office, Des. 179,896, Mar. 19, 1957

The Hackney was a marque of junior car which seated one adult or two children, built in the mid-to-later 1950s by the Gordon W. Morton Company of High Point Road in Greensboro, North Carolina. Hubert H. Hackney applied for a patent for this miniature car design on August 19, 1955, and the patent was approved by the United States Patent Office on March 19, 1957 for a term of 14 years.

The Hackney somewhat resembled the concurrent Eshelman automobile, but differed in its most remarkable engineering features, which included what the manufacturer termed its "Floating Power Unit" (FPU)—a self-contained rear-mounted engine, clutch, and drivetrain combination—in concert with the rear wheels and independent of the body. The FPU was mounted on pivots at front and back. Also, a floorboard-mounted one-stick control operated both forward and rear motions, and even operated braking action. The throttle control was mounted on the dashboard; a rope-recoil starter was used.

Two models were offered; the Standard and the Deluxe, with the latter model featuring a wraparound Plexiglas windshield in then-contemporary fashion, an electric horn, head and tail lamps, and a lightning-bolt trim design on the flanks. Bumpers and a trailer hitch were standard on all models.

The squarish-looking Hackney bodies were of sheet steel; a running change added small fins atop the rear fenders on later models. Standard factory colors were red with white trim and wheels.

Engines were supplied by several manufacturers but extant Hackney cars usually have a 2 HP Clinton four-cycle powerplant, which allowed speeds to six mph.

Hackney moved lived and died in Greensboro, North Carolina, built cabs, bodies, and commercial equipment.

== See also ==
- Crosley
