= Pocket Classics =

Brand of half-scale cars

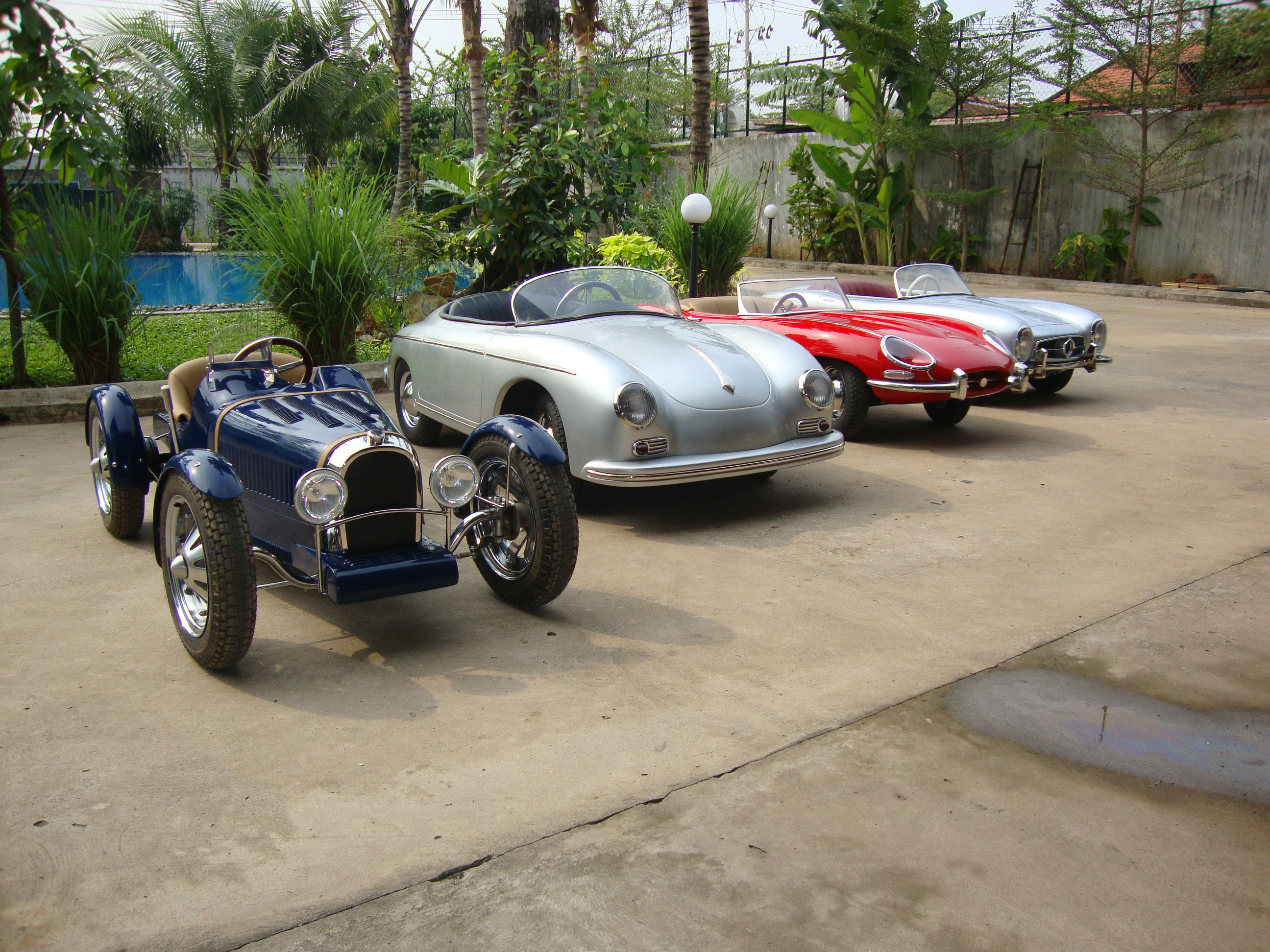
- Four Pocket Classics
- Type: Children's toys
- Country: United Kingdom
- Availability: 2010–
- Slogan: The World's Greatest Toys
- Official website

Pocket Classics were a brand of "Junior cars", half-scale drivable classic cars, sold in the UK and Europe. Intended for children, they could also be driven by adults. Founded in 2010, the company was no longer in business as of 2023.

== Description ==
The cars are designed for children, but can be driven by adults as well. Petrol powered versions can top 45 mph, and electric versions 15 mph. Each car is different, however they typically have features such as indicators, headlights and horns. The build time for each individual car was reportedly about three months.

== Models ==
Pocket Classics have had two generations of cars which are all tributes to classic cars, but not endorsed or associated with the manufacturers of the original cars or branded as such:

Generation 1: 5 models Porsche 356, Mercedes 300SL, Jaguar E-type, Bugatti Type 35 and Willys Jeep

Generation 2: 3 models Jaguar XK120, AC Cobra, Ferrari 250 GT California Spyder

== Media coverage ==
Pocket Classics were first featured in the media in late 2010 by Bild. The cars were also road tested by Pistonheads.
