= Peel Trident =

Three-wheeled automobile

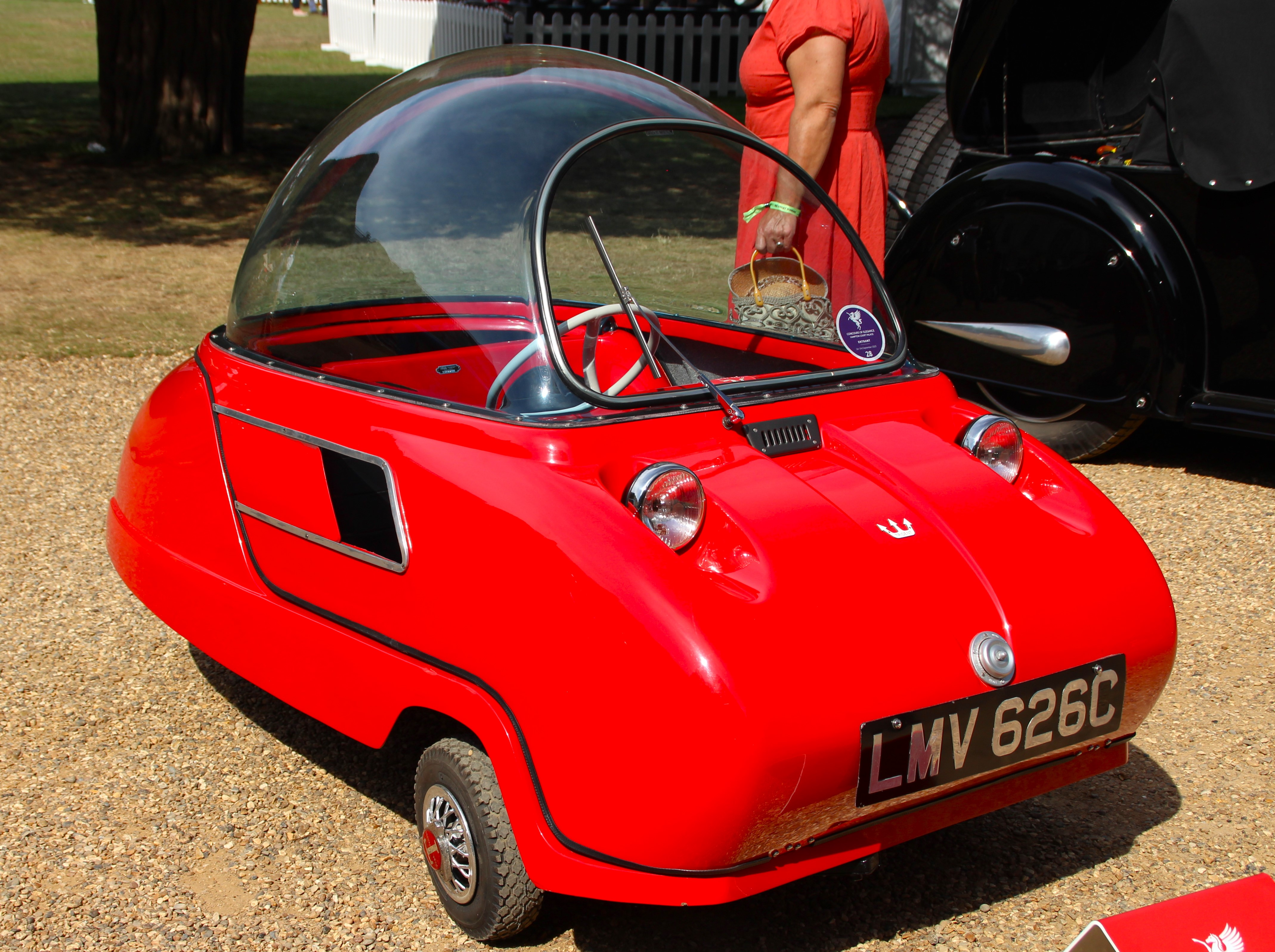

Overview
- Manufacturer: Peel Engineering Company (1965–1966); Peel Engineering Ltd. (2011–present)
- Production: 1965–1966 (Approximately 45 produced); 2011–present
- Designer: Cyril Cannell

Body and chassis
- Class: Microcar
- Body style: Flip-top (no-door) coupé
- Layout: Rear-engine, rear-wheel drive
- Related: Peel P50, Peel Manxcar, Peel Viking Sport

Powertrain
- Engine: 49 cc (3.0 cu in; 0.049 L) DKW 804-1600; 99 cc (6.0 cu in; 0.099 L) Triumph Tina
- Power output: 4.2–4.5 brake horsepower (4.3–4.6 PS; 3.1–3.4 kW); 6–8 newton-metres (4.4–5.9 lb⋅ft)
- Transmission: 3-speed manual

Dimensions
- Length: 73 in (185 cm)
- Width: 39 in (99 cm)
- Kerb weight: 330 lb (150 kg)

Chronology
- Predecessor: Peel P50
- Successor: Peel Viking Sport

The Peel Trident is the second three-wheeled microcar built by the Peel Engineering Company on the Isle of Man. An all-new design from its one-seat counterpart the Peel P50, the Trident has two seats.

== History ==
The Trident was launched at the 1964 British Motorcycle Show held at Earls Court. The seat, stated as being 31 in (79 cm) wide, was intended to provide for use as an occasional two-seater.

A completely new design from the earlier side-engined Peel P50 microcar, the Trident was manufactured in 1965 and 1966.

In 2011, Peel Engineering Ltd. reinstated manufacture of the Peel Trident and P50, in Sutton-in-Ashfield, near Nottingham, England. All vehicles are hand-built to order in petrol and electric form.

== Description and specifications ==
The glass-fibre shell was a monocoque with coil-sprung, undamped wheels. It featured a clear bubble top and either two seats or one seat with a detachable shopping basket.

The Lakeland Motor Museum observes that the Trident's bubble top constituted grounds for its sobriquet "The Terrestrial Flying Saucer." Like its predecessor, it was marketed as a "shopping car" or a "Saloon Scooter".

The car is 73 in (1,854 mm) long and 39 in (991 mm) wide, with a weight of 330 lb (150 kg). Like the P50, it uses a 49 cc (3.0 cu in) DKW engine which generates 4.2 hp (3 kW), providing a top speed of 28 mph (45 km/h). It was advertised that the Trident got 100 miles per imperial gallon (2.8 L/100 km; 83 mpg_{‑US}), "almost cheaper than walking". The original retail price was £190.

All engines supplied to Peel from Zweirad Union (for both the P50 and Trident) were of the 49 cc 3-speed 4.2 hp 804–1600 type. Uniquely, however, the Peel engines had the 8th digit as a 4, thus being of the form 80416004***. This car is one of the smallest in the world.

== Gallery ==
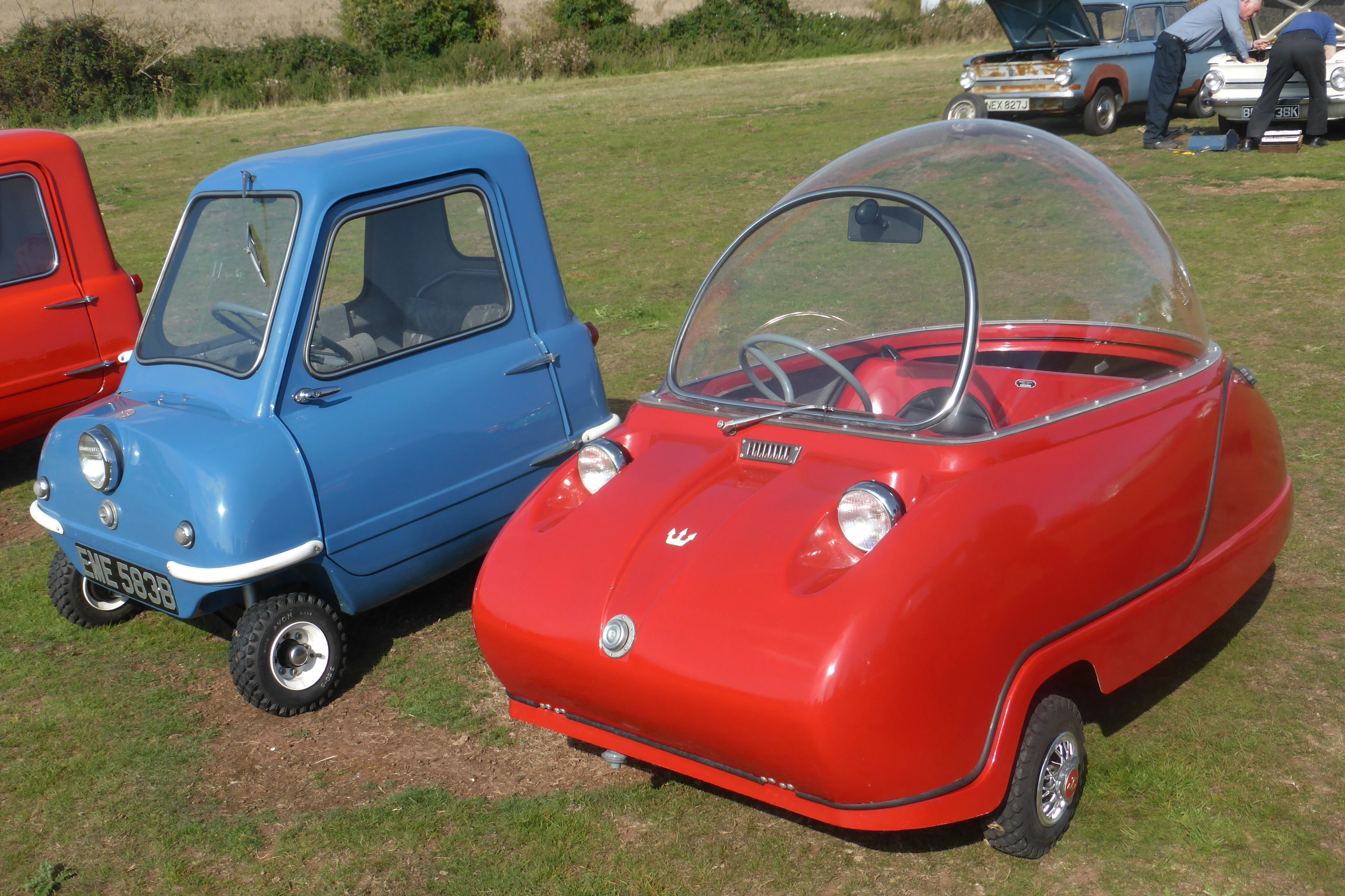
Peel Trident next to a Peel P50

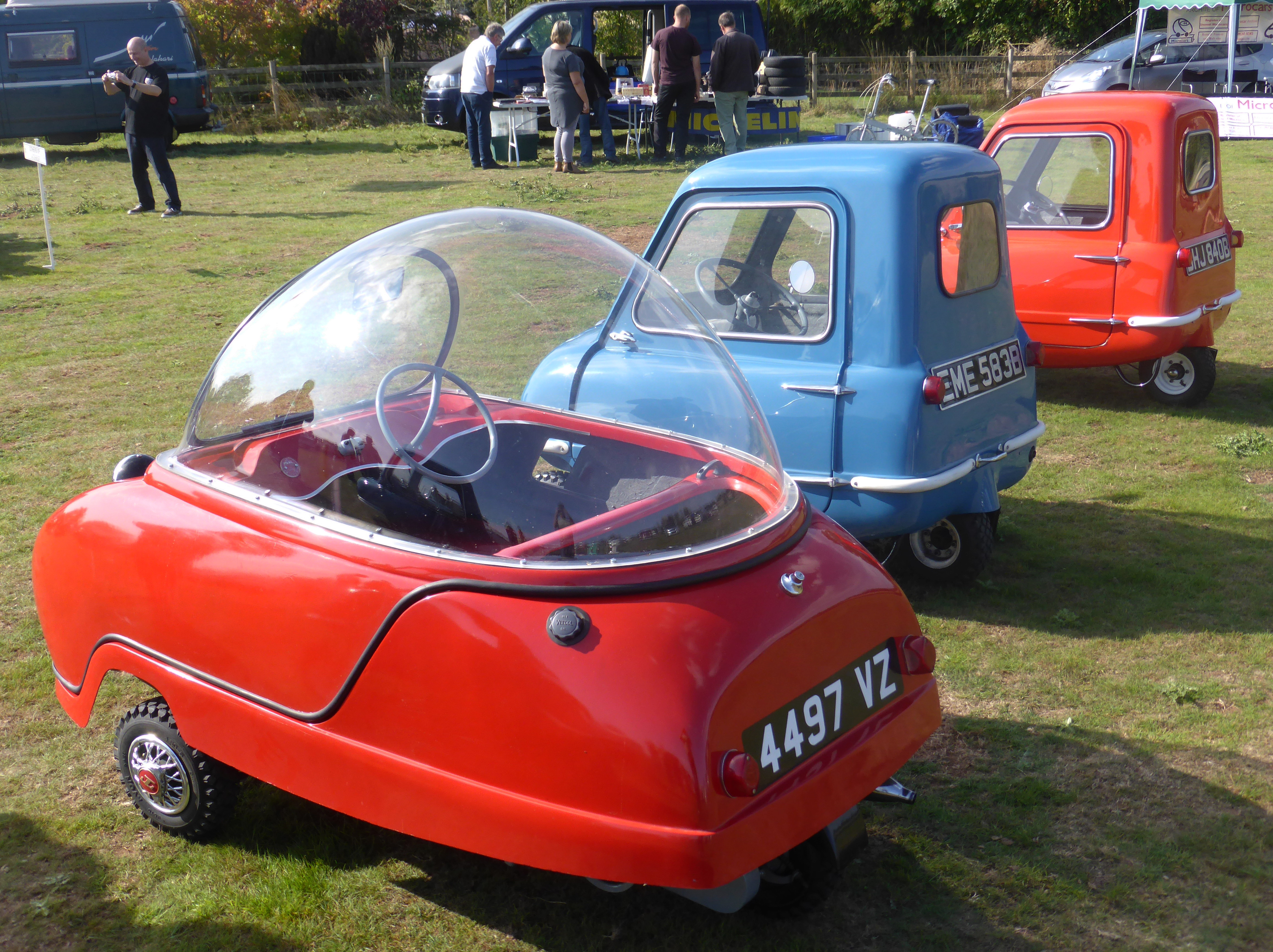
Rear view

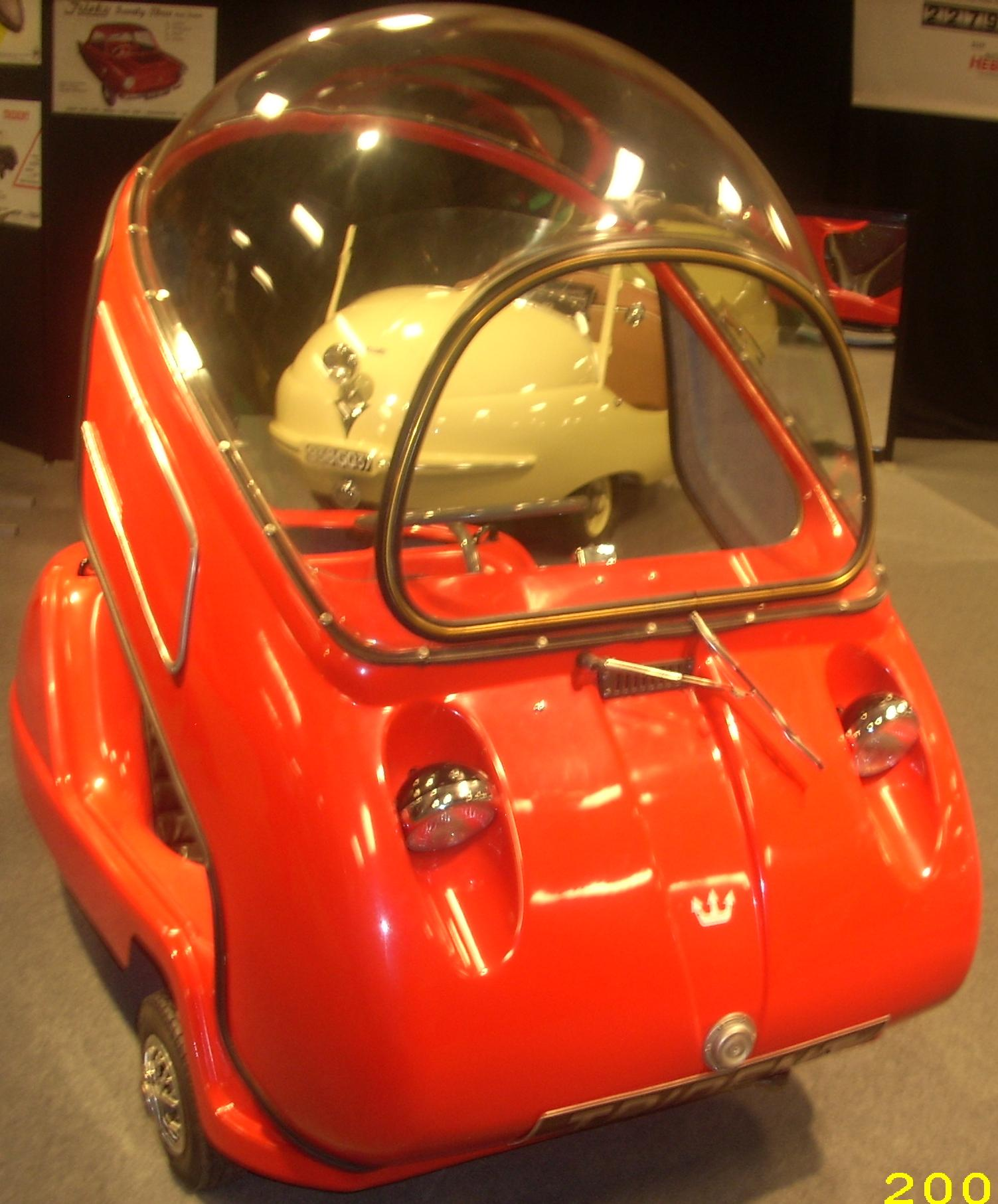
Trident with its three-pronged Trident badge, exhibiting how the shell opened to permit entry, unlike the P50 which had a side-door
