= Microcar =

Smallest automobile classification

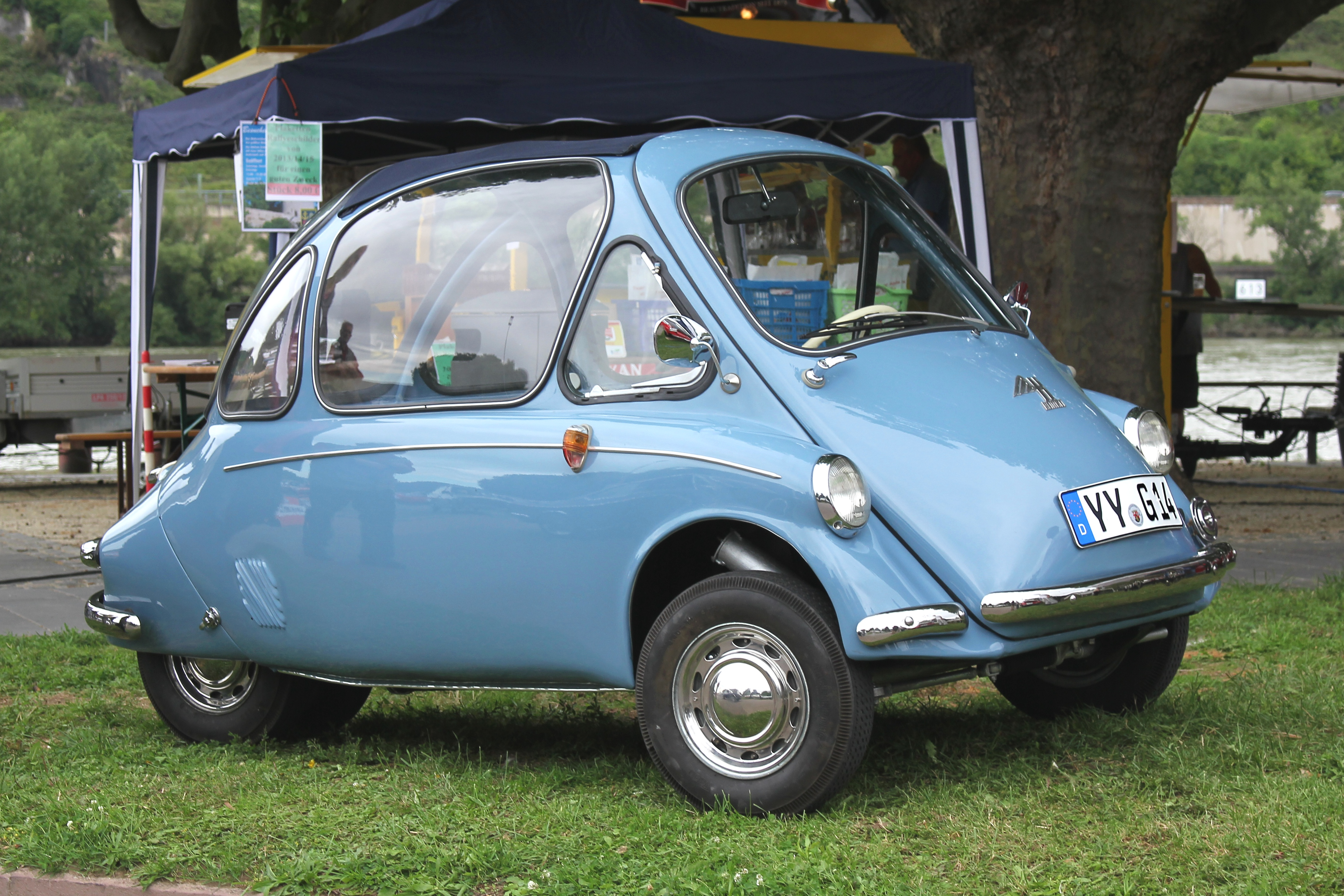
1957 Heinkel Kabine bubble car

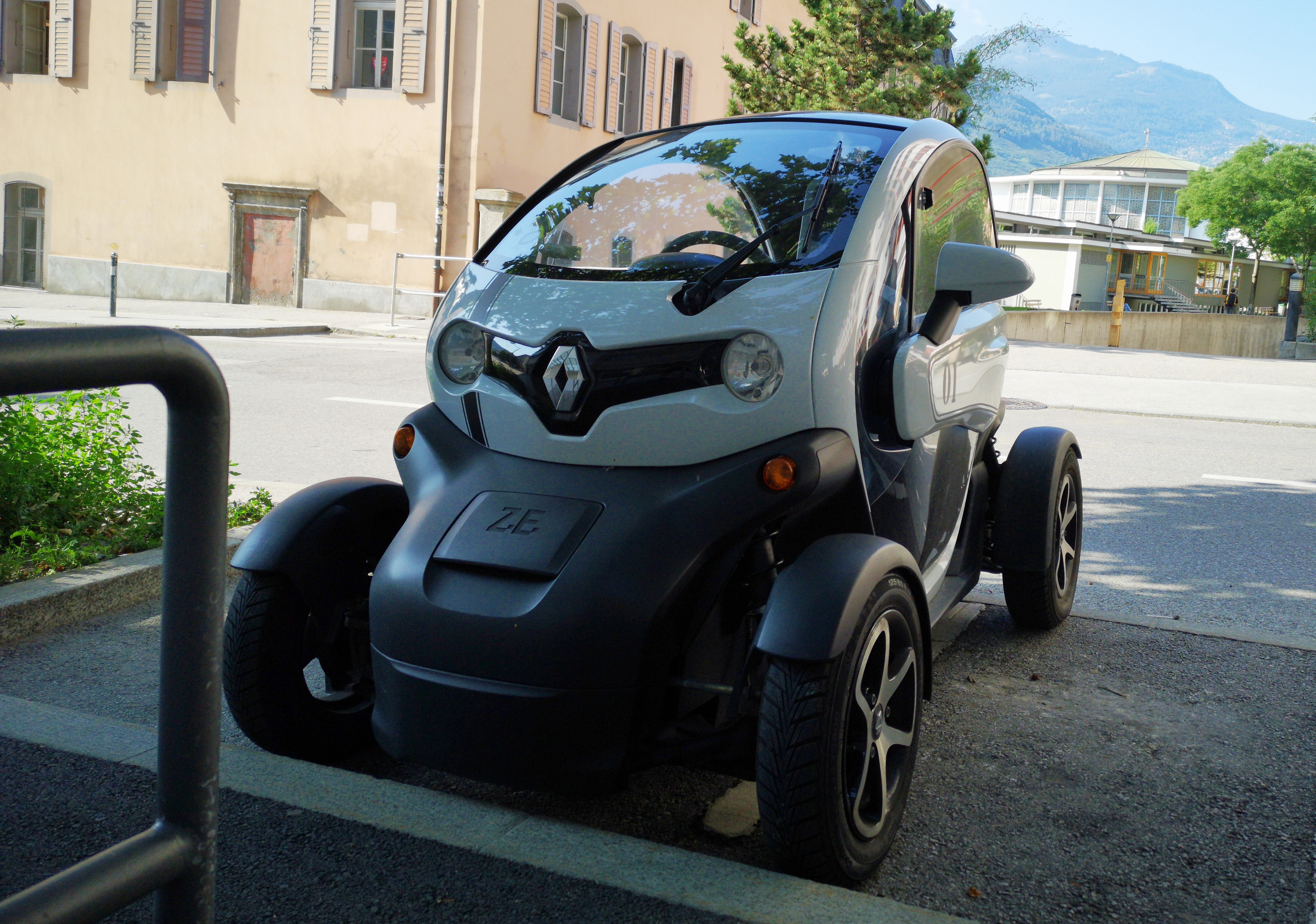
2012 Renault Twizy quadricycle

Microcar is a term often used for the smallest size of cars, with three or four wheels and typically with an engine smaller than 700 cc (43 cu in). Specific types of microcars include bubble cars, cycle cars, invacar, quadricycles and voiturettes. Microcars are often covered by separate regulations from normal cars, having relaxed requirements for registration and licensing.

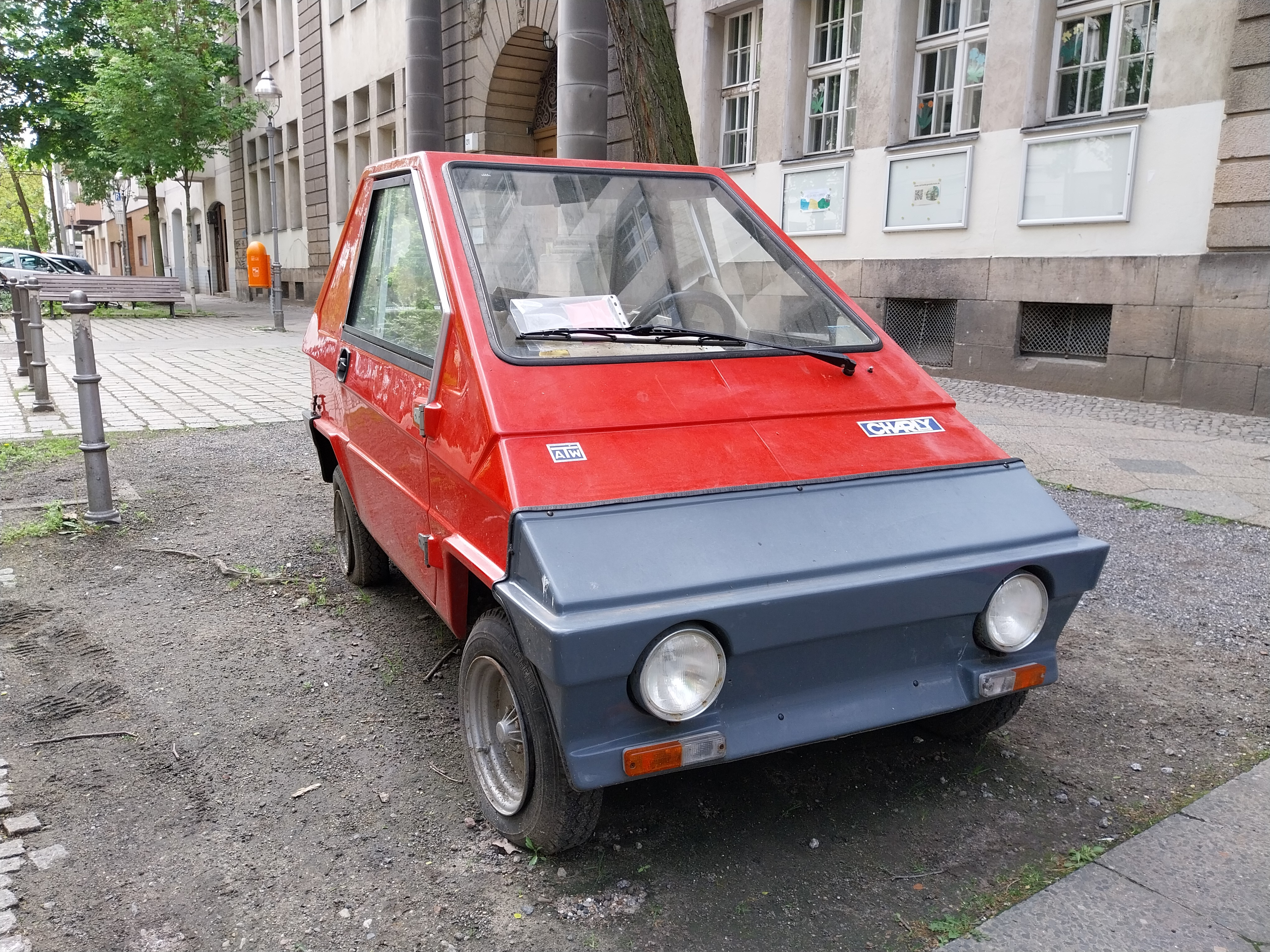
All-Cars Charly 4

== Predecessors ==
Voiturette is a term used by some small cars and tricycles in Europe manufactured from 1895 to 1910, characterized by their light weight and basic appearance.

Cyclecars are a type of small, lightweight car manufactured in Europe and North America mainly between 1910 and the late 1920s. A sort of hybrid between regular cars and motorcycles, cyclecars were small three- or four-wheeled vehicles made of inexpensive light materials, with low-powered engines, and usually featuring only two seats that were often in tandem.

== Europe 1940–1970: Microcars ==
The first cars to be described as microcars (earlier equivalents were called voiturettes or cyclecars) were built in the United Kingdom and Germany following World War II, and remained popular until the 1960s. They were originally called minicars, but later became known as microcars.

France also produced large numbers of similar tiny vehicles called voiturettes, but they were rarely sold abroad.

=== Characteristics ===
Microcars have three or four wheels, although most were three-wheelers which, in many countries, meant that they qualified for lower taxes and were licensed as motorcycles. Another common characteristic is an engine displacement of less than 700 cc (43 cu in), although several cars with engines up to 1,000 cc (61 cu in) have also been classified as microcars. Often, the engine was originally designed for a motorcycle.

=== History ===
Microcars originated in the years following World War II, when motorcycles were commonly used. To provide better weather protection, three-wheeled microcars began increasing in popularity in the United Kingdom, where they could be driven using only a motorcycle licence. One of the first microcars was the 1949 Bond Minicar.

Microcars also became popular in Europe. A demand for cheap personal motorised transport emerged, and their greater fuel efficiency meant that microcars became even more significant when fuel prices rose, partly due to the 1956 Suez Crisis.

The microcar boom lasted until the late 1950s, when larger cars regained popularity. The 1959 introduction of the Mini, which provided greater size and performance at an affordable price, contributed to the decline in popularity of microcars. Production of microcars had largely ceased by the end of the 1960s, due to competition from the Mini, Citroën 2CV, Fiat 500 and Renault 4.

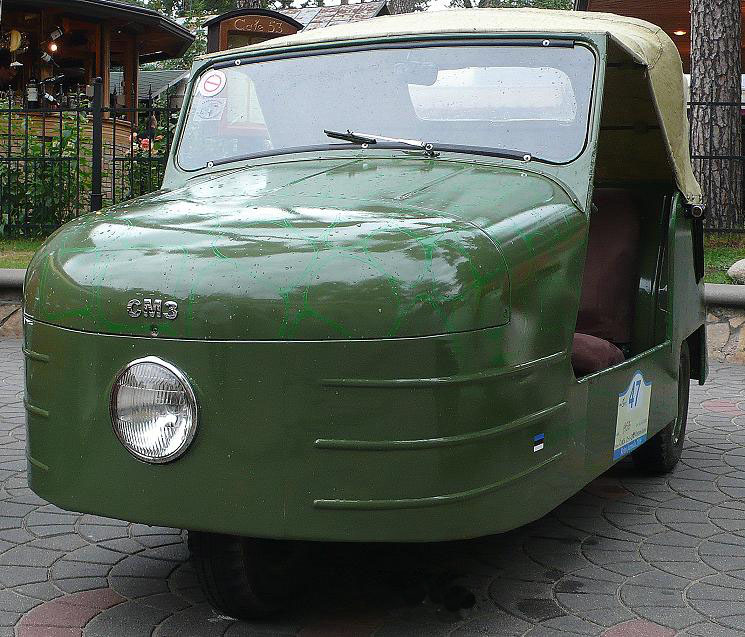
1952–1958 SMZ S-1L

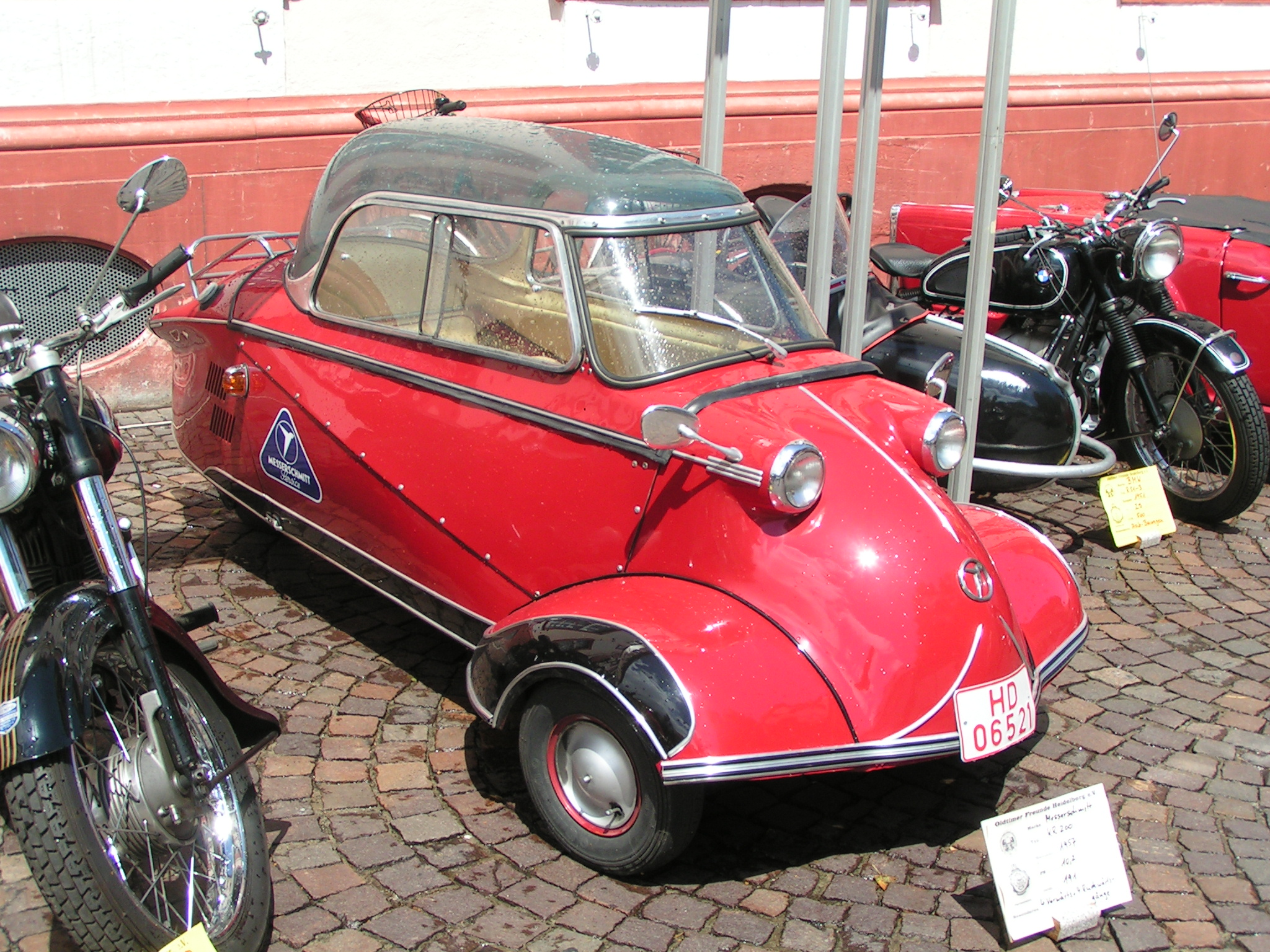
1955–1964 Messerschmitt KR200

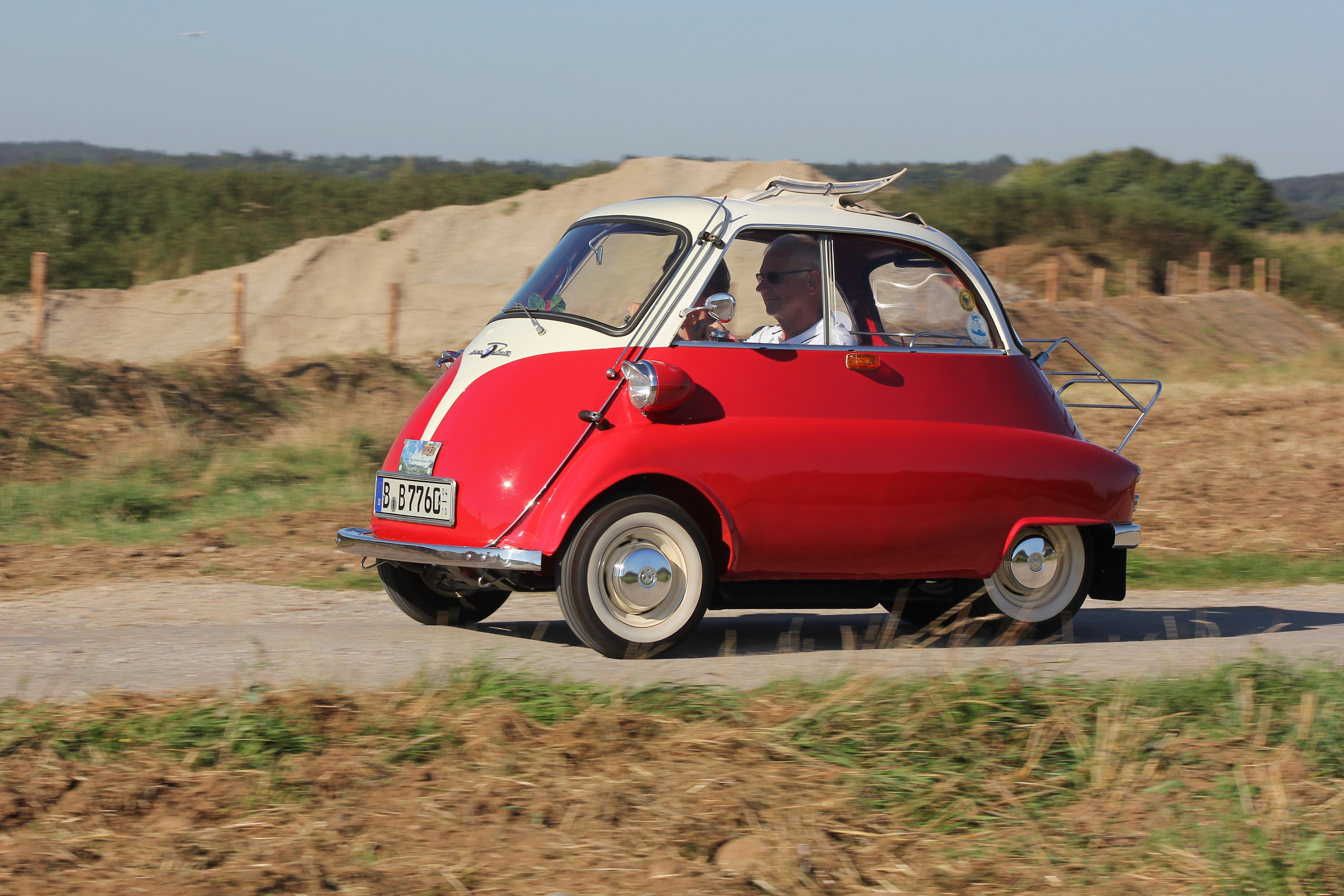
1959–1962 BMW Isetta

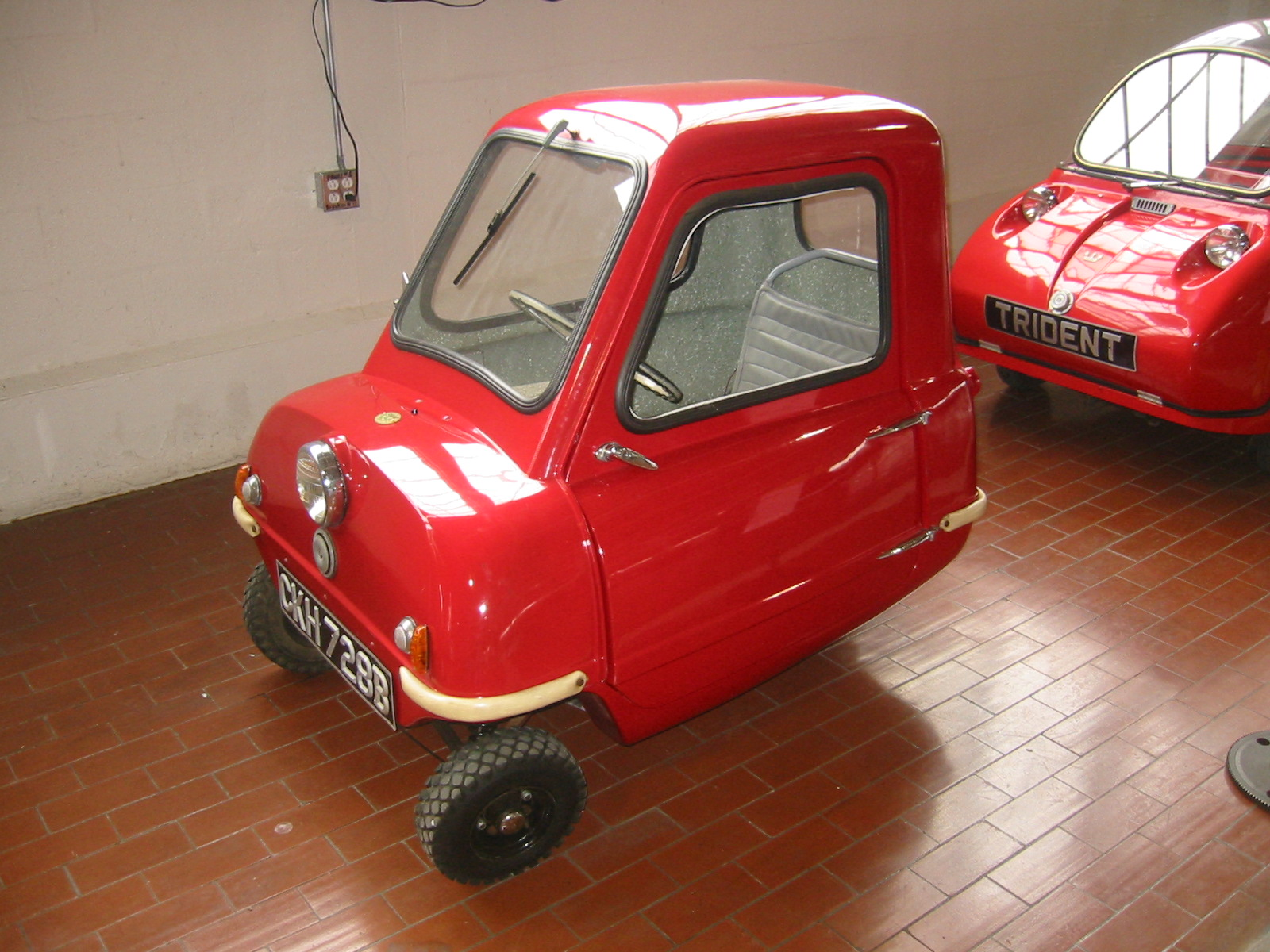
1962–1965 Peel P50

=== Bubble cars ===
Several microcars of the 1950s and 1960s were nicknamed bubble cars. This was due to the aircraft-style bubble canopies of vehicles such as the Messerschmitt KR175, Messerschmitt KR200 and the FMR Tg500. Other microcars, such as the Isetta, also had a bubble-like appearance.

German manufacturers of bubble cars included former military aircraft manufacturers Messerschmitt and Heinkel. BMW manufactured the Italian Iso Rivolta Isetta under licence, using an engine based on one from one of their own motorcycles.

The United Kingdom had licence-built right-hand-drive versions of the Heinkel Kabine and the Isetta. The British version of the Isetta was built with only one rear wheel, instead of the narrow-tracked pair of wheels in the normal Isetta design, in order to take advantage of the three-wheel vehicle laws in the United Kingdom. There were also indigenous British three-wheeled microcars, including the Peel Trident.

Examples include the Citroën Prototype C, FMR Tg500, Fuldamobil, Heinkel Kabine, Isetta, Messerschmitt KR175, Messerschmitt KR200, Peel P50, Peel Trident, SMZ S-1L, Trojan 200, and Kleinschnittger F125.

== Worldwide 1990–present ==
Recent microcars include the 2001 Aixam 5xx series, Renault Twizy, Citroën Ami, and XEV Yoyo.

Electric-powered microcars which have reached production include the 1974 Sebring-Vanguard CitiCar and its derivatives, 1987 CityEl, the 1990 Automobiles ERAD Spacia, the 1999 Corbin Sparrow, the 2001 REVAi, the 2005 Commuter Cars Tango, the 2009 Tazzari Zero and the resurrected Peel P50 of 2011 (the original model of 1962 - 65 being petrol powered).

The Smart Fortwo is often called a microcar in the United States; although it requires a regular licence to drive.

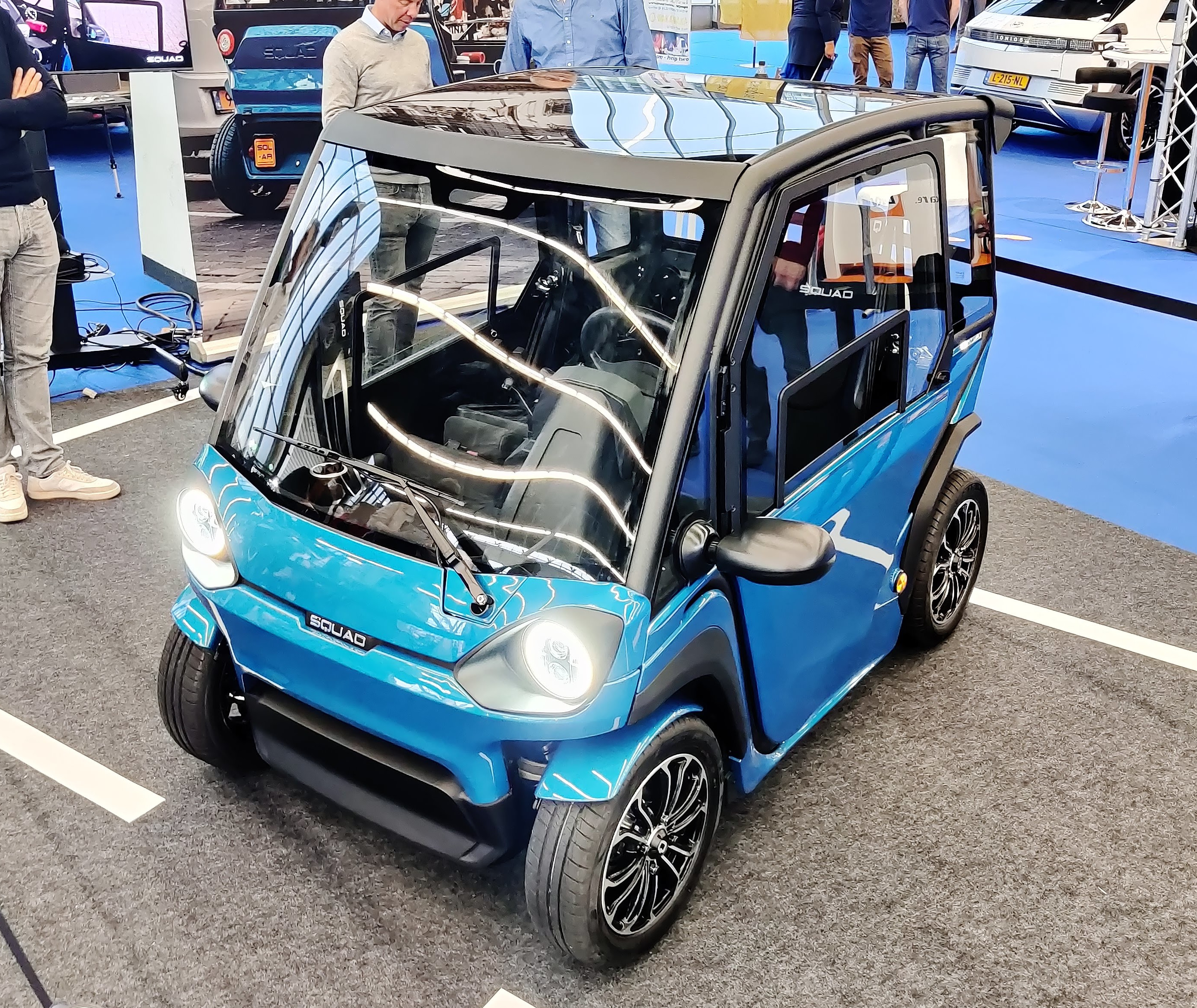
Squad Solar, a Neighborhood Electric Vehicle

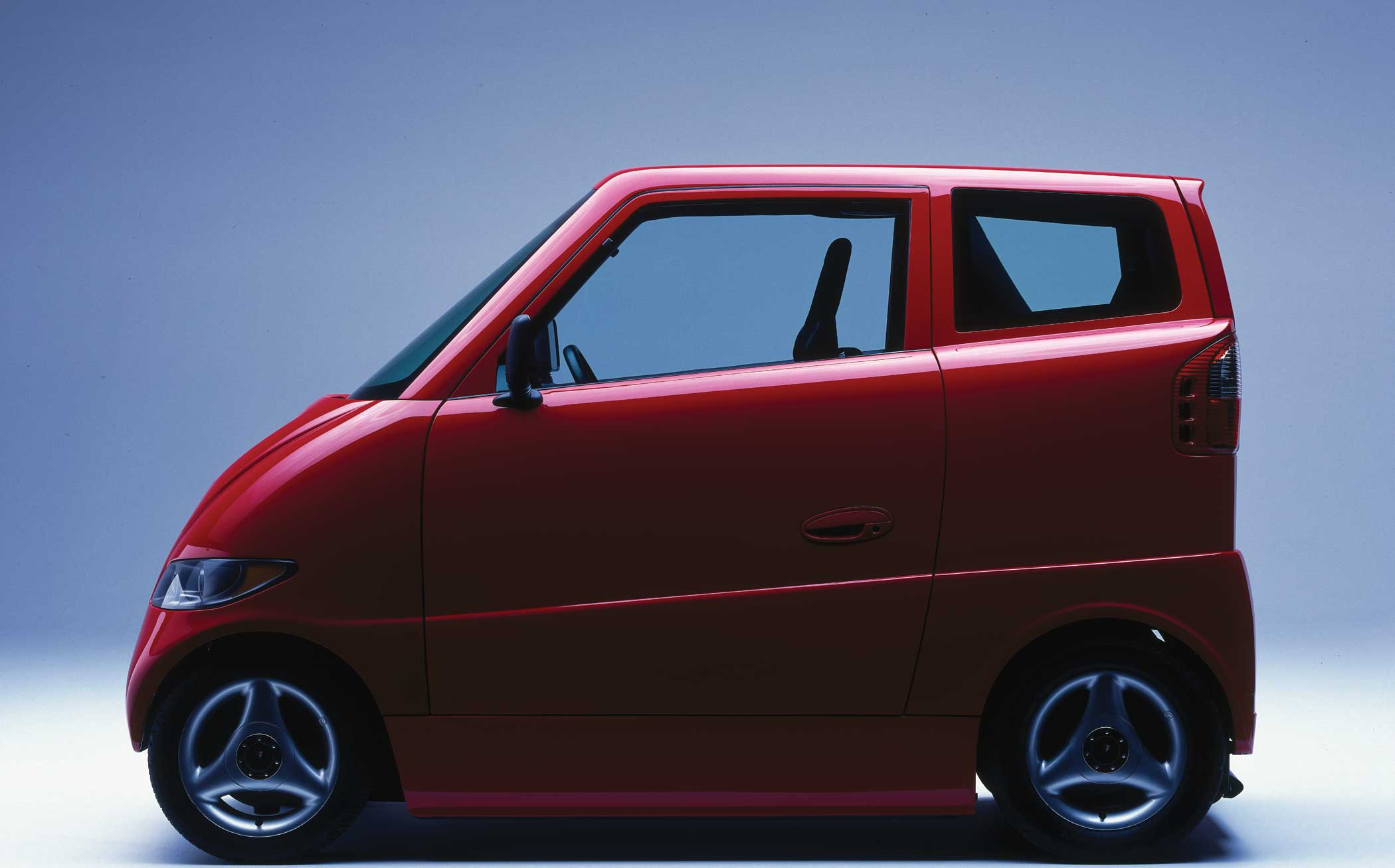
The Commuter Cars Tango, 8 ft 5 in (257 cm) long and 39 in (990 mm) wide

=== Kei cars ===
In the 1950s, Japanese legislatures created the class of Kei cars, offering reduced taxes for cars below a size limit. At the program's inception in 1955, the limit for engine capacity was below 360 cubic centimeters, with a length of under 126 inches (320 cm) also required. The limits have since increased, with kei cars today allowed to use engines of up to 660 cc and attain a length of 134 inches (340 cm). Although most kei cars are designed in Japan, some, such as the Smart K and the BYD Racco, are versions of foreign-made cars designed to comply with Japanese regulations.

=== Quadricycle legislation ===
The European Union introduced the quadricycle category in 1992. In several European countries since then, microcars are classified by governments separately from normal cars, sometimes using the same regulations as motorcycles or mopeds. Therefore, compared with normal cars, microcars often have relaxed requirements for registration and licensing, and can be subject to lower taxes and insurance costs.

== Junior cars ==
Junior cars are motorized cars for children, typically copies of real designs. Originally powered either by electric engines or small internal combustion engines, electric engines currently dominate. From the 1926 Baby Bugatti until today, junior cars are often as expensive as a real car and are built to a higher standard than a ride-in toy car. As with the Bugatti, these are frequently sold directly by real car manufacturers such as Porsche and Ferrari. In the 1990s, Aston Martin built a half-scale junior car version of the then-new Aston Martin Virage Volante, with a handmade aluminium body, leather interior, and 160-cc Honda engine. It cost as much as a brand new Mercedes-Benz 190E at the time.

Manufacturers include Pocket Classics, the Little Car Company, Eshelman, and Hackney.

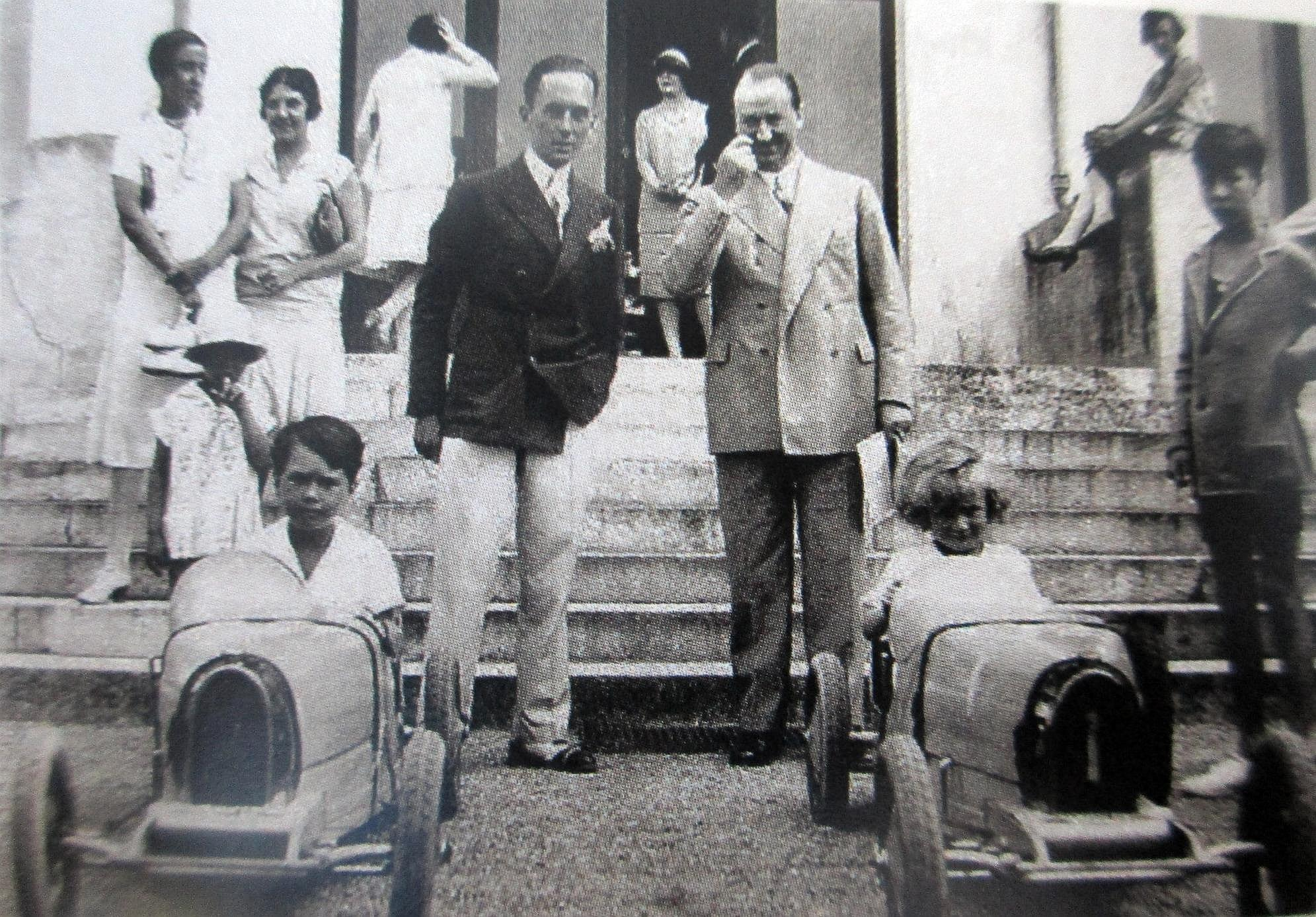
Roland and Jean Bugatti in their Baby Bugattis

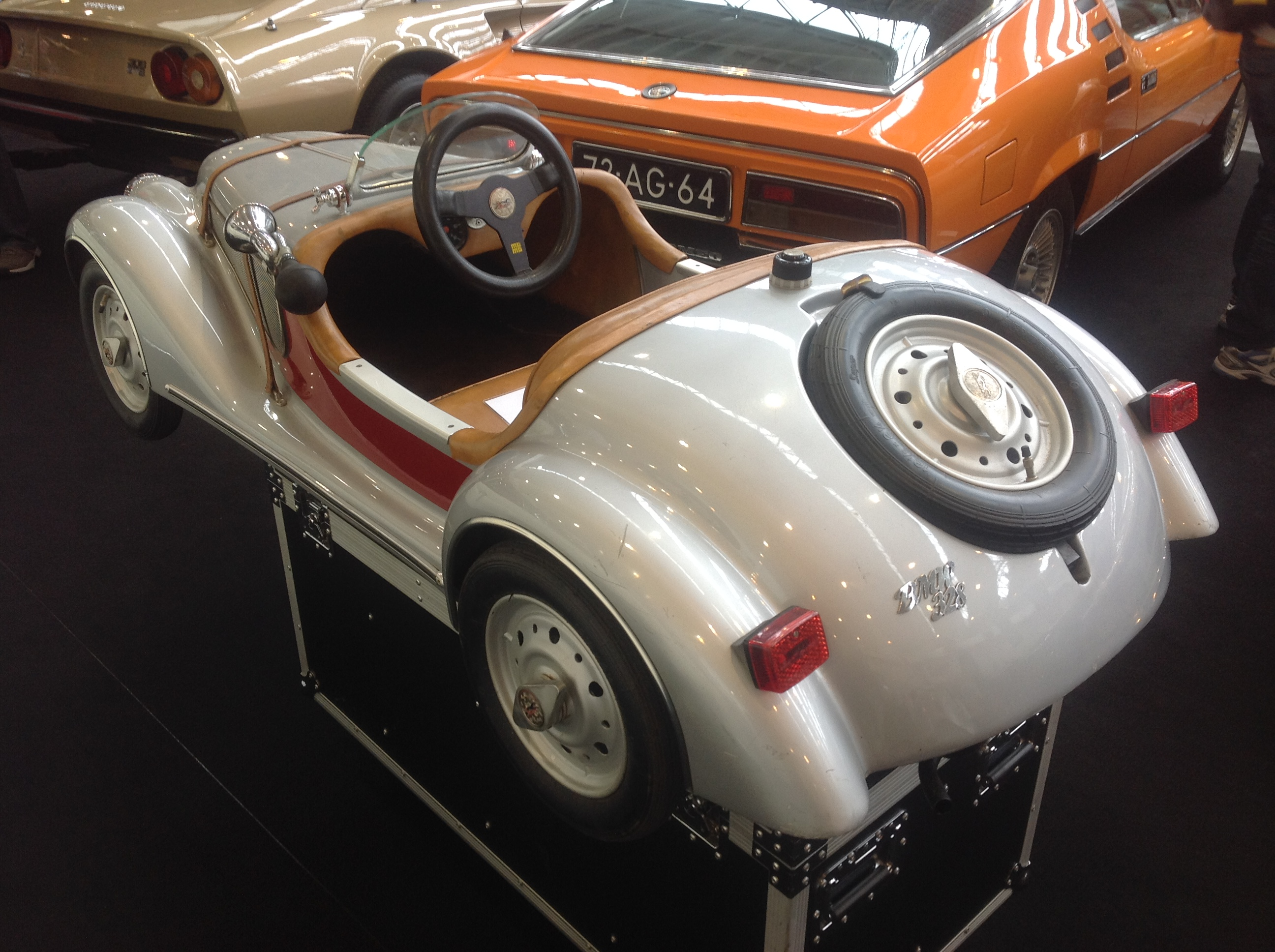
Sbarro 328 Baby

== Microcar trucks ==
There are also a variety of microcar trucks, usually of the "forward control" or van style to provide more cargo room. These might be used for local deliveries on narrow streets that are unsuited to larger vehicles. The Piaggio Ape is a three-wheeled example. The Honda Acty is a four-wheeled example.

== See also ==
- Car classification
- Economy car
- Kei car
- Neighborhood Electric Vehicle
- Velomobile
