= West Marine Ltd. (Peel Engineering) =

British boat manufacturer

West Marine Ltd. was a wholly owned subsidiary of the Peel Engineering Company, which was founded by designer, inventor and engineer Cyril Cannell in the late 1940s, initially focusing on boat construction and marine equipment before expanding into microcars, GRP boats and other fibreglass products.

West Marine was located in the boat yard by the side of the River Neb at the top of Peel harbour, in the Isle of Man.

Their products included an 19-foot Inshoreman boat nicknamed the 'Peel Pig'. This was a simple small fishing boat with a small cuddy forward. It was powered by a Volvo Penta 2002 twin-cylinder inboard diesel engine producing 18 HP, coupled to a Volvo Penta MS2B gearbox. They were made at a factory in Jurby at the North of the Isle of Man.

They also produced a 25-foot Midshoreman designed by Reverend Dr Ewan Corlett OBE FREng, a distinguished British naval architect who was also pivotal in restoring the SS Great Britain, which was especially suited to the Irish Sea, they were fitted with an inboard diesel engine and Z outdrive. These craft had a forward 2-berth cabin, a 2-berth mid-cabin which doubled up as a galley/saloon, and a separate head. The wheelhouse was open to the rear straight onto the deck. There were only supposed to be three of these ever made, to qualify for an Isle of Man Government business grant, which was never received.

Additionally a 33- or 35-foot Offshoreman was produced, which was a motor sailer, with possibly only one or two built. West Marine Ltd also produced a small rowboat/tender with possible sailing capabilities; this is believed to be a GRP copy of an old boat that was lying around the yard at the time.

The company West Marine Ltd was finally dissolved in 1997.

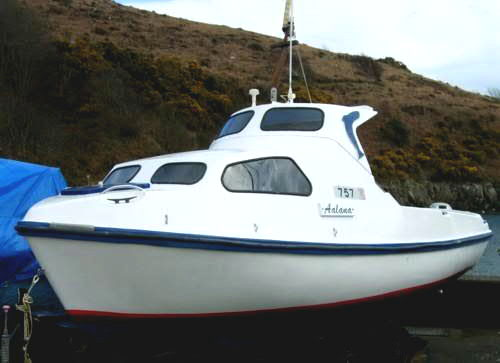
Inshoreman

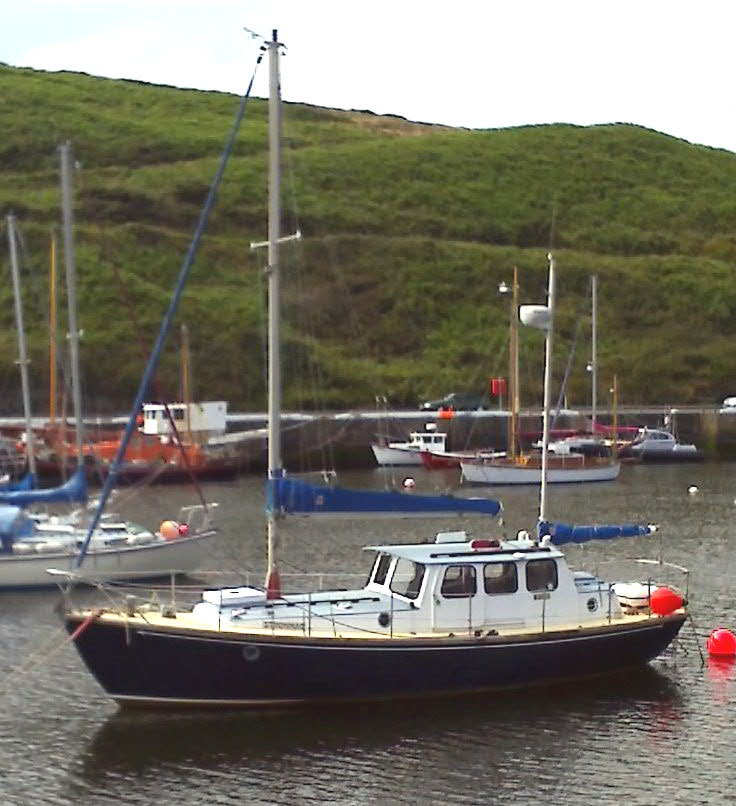
Offshoreman

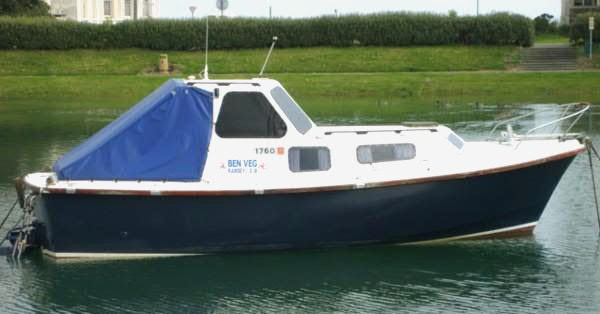
Midshoreman
