= Peel Viking Sport =

Viking Sport
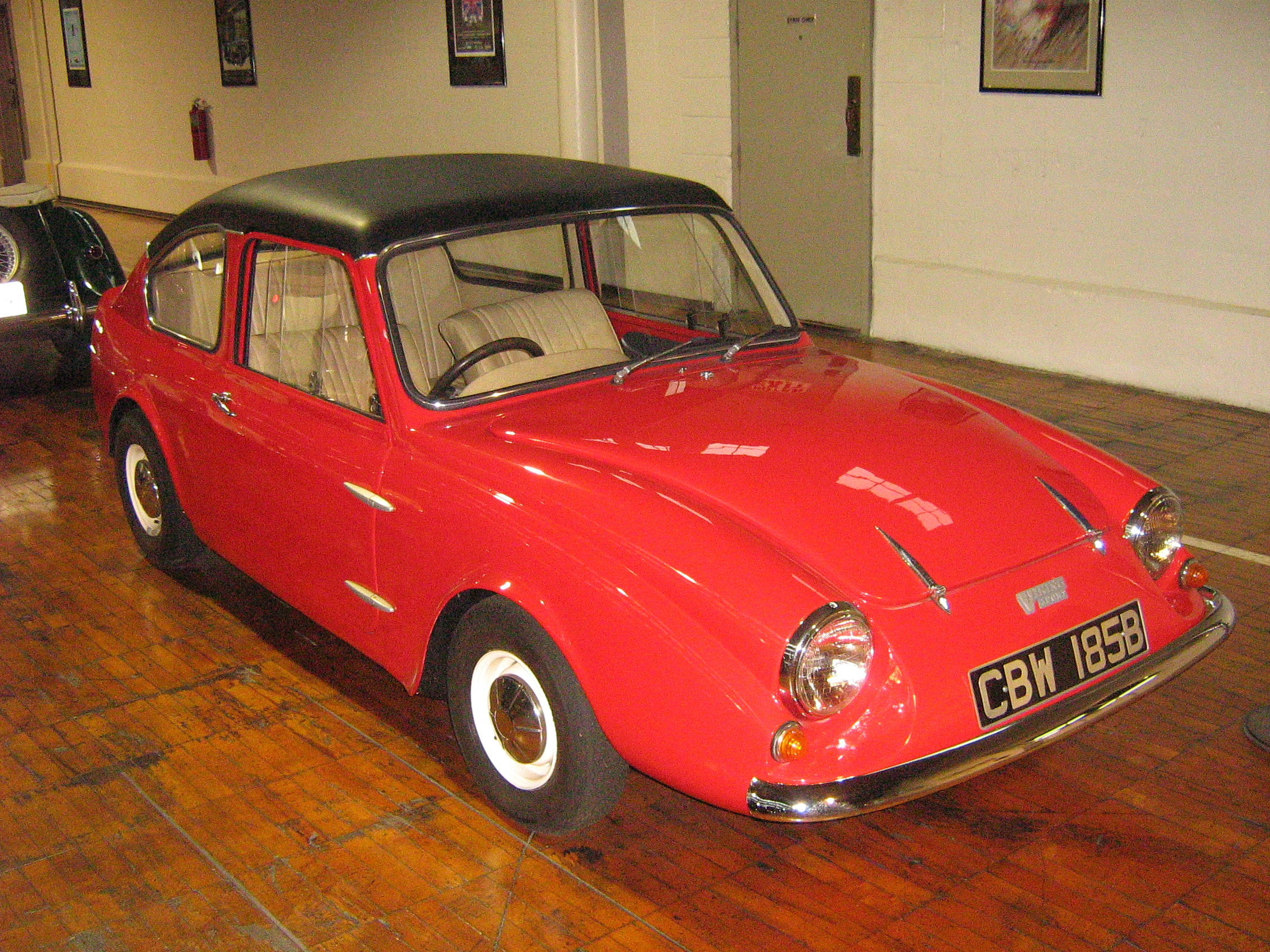

Overview
- Manufacturer: Peel Engineering/Viking Performance
- Production: 1966-1967; 25 (approx) made

Body and chassis
- Body style: sports coupé

Powertrain
- Engine: Mini 848cc
- Transmission: 4-speed manual

Chronology
- Predecessor: Peel Trident

The Peel Viking Sport was a Mini-based car made by the Peel Engineering Company on the Isle of Man between 1966 and 1970. The 2+2 debuted at the 1966 Racing Car Show. Using moulded replicas of cut-down Mini doors, the glassfibre, monocoque, fastback styled bodyshell sold for 230 GBP and accepted standard Mini front and rear subframes on a square tube chassis.

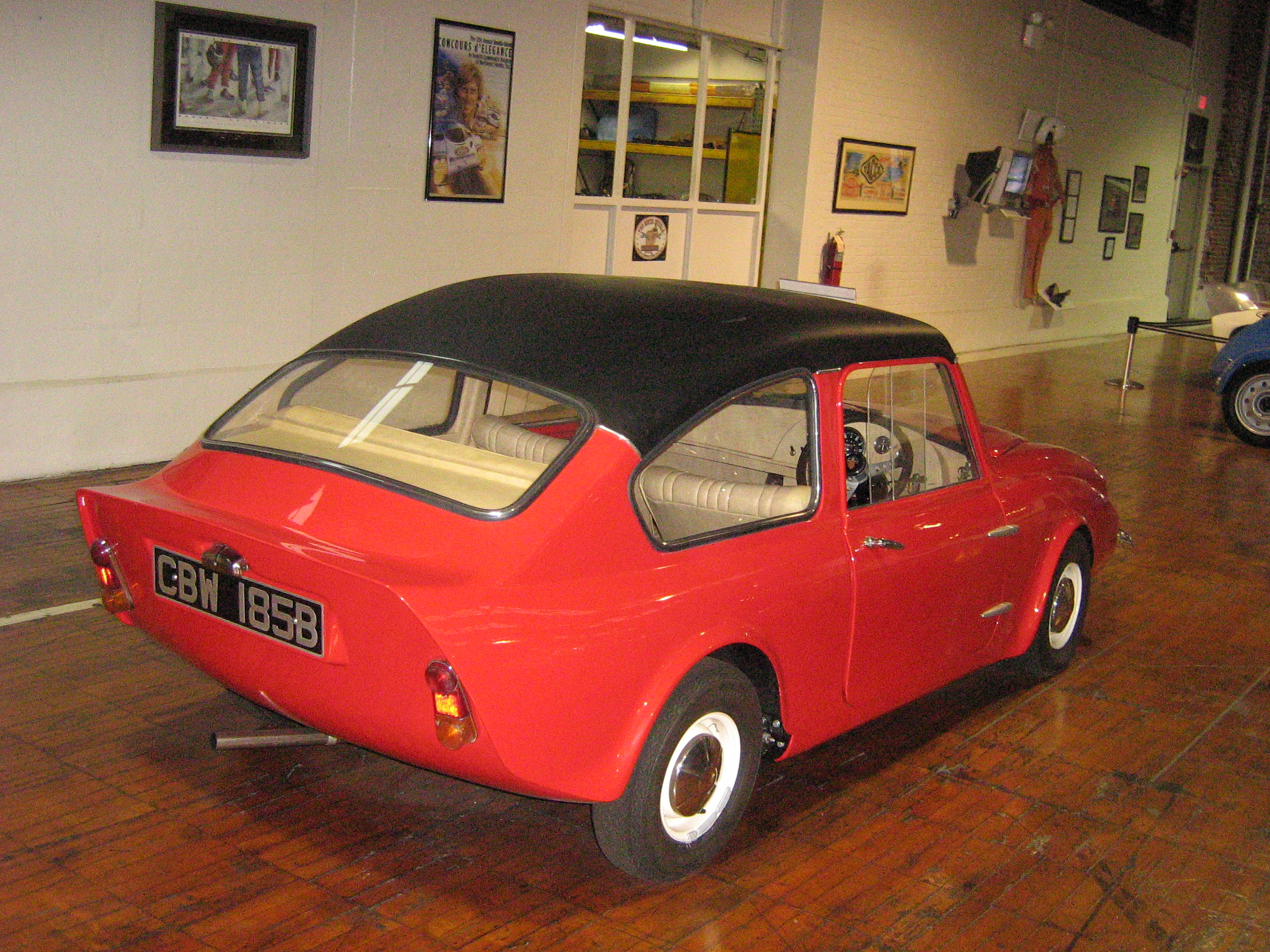
Peel Viking rear view

After two prototypes, production was taken over by Bill Last who formed Viking Performance of Woodbridge, Suffolk to make it and the car was renamed the Viking Minisport. About 22 examples are thought to have been built before production ended in 1970. New evidence now proves Peel Engineering were still supplying Viking bodyshells to customers as late as December 1969. Viking Performance became Trident Cars in 1967 producing the TVR based Clipper car.
