= List of motorized trikes =

List of three-wheeled vehicles that are powered by a motor

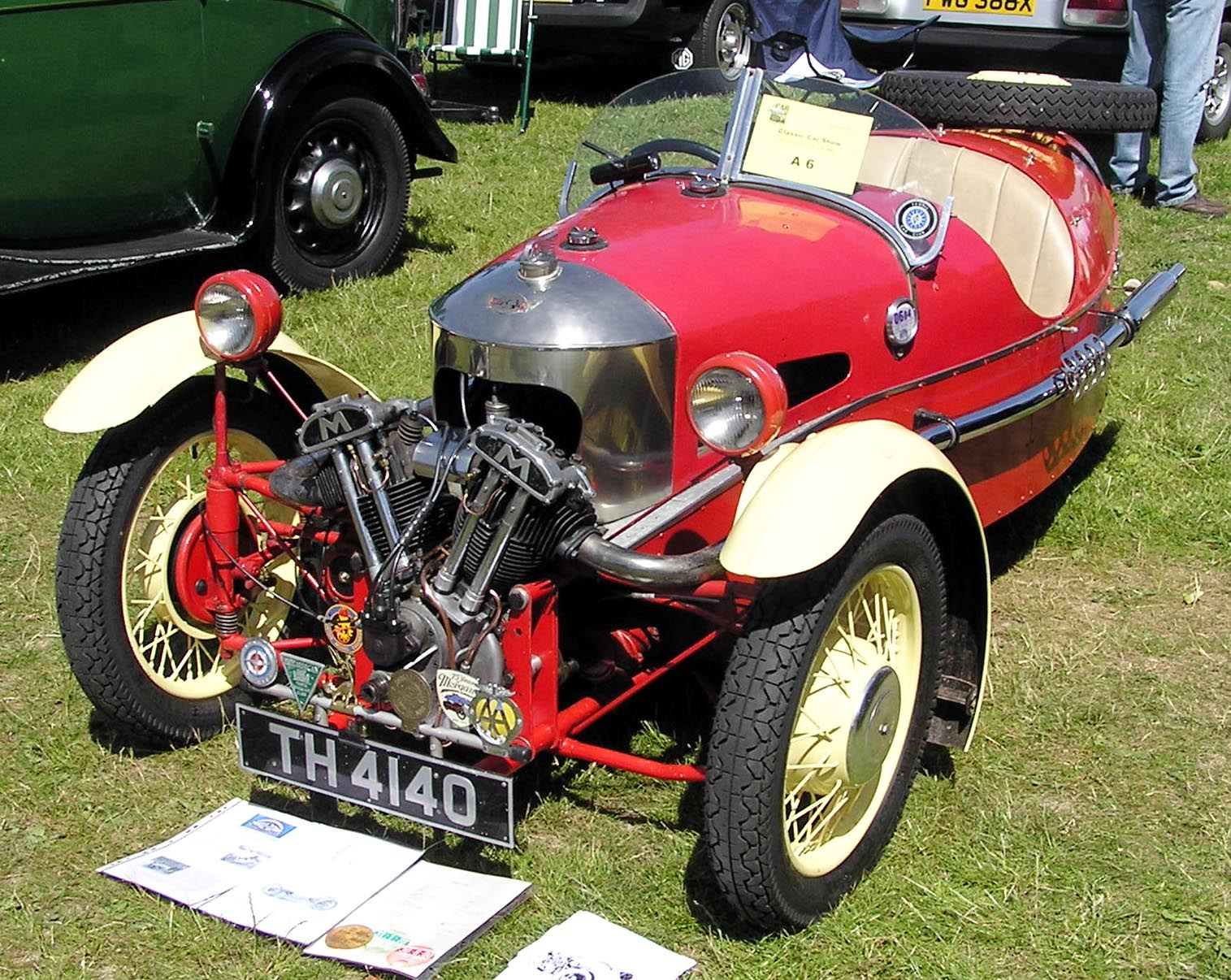
1934 Morgan Super Sports with Matchless engine

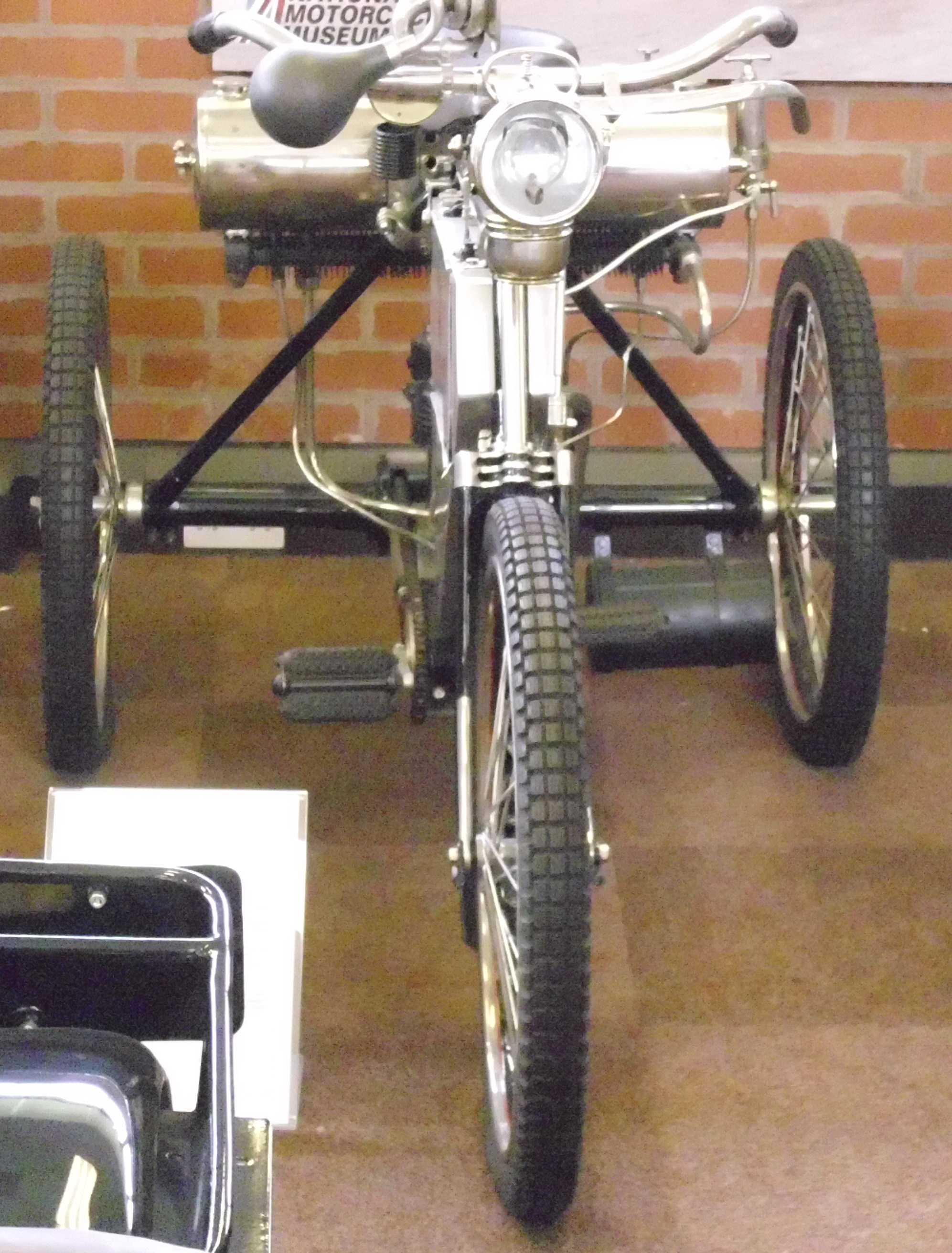
Ariel 2.25 HP Tricycle

Motorized tricycles, also called trikes, are sometimes considered cars. There are three typical configurations: motorized bicycle with sidecar; two wheels in the rear, one in the front (aka trike); and two in front, one in the rear (aka reverse trike). However, language and definitions vary.

One of the most successful trikes of its day was the De Dion-Bouton tricycle; from 1897 until the start of the 20th century about 15,000 licensed copies were sold, with De Dion Bouton usually supplying the engines, and it was overall the most popular motor vehicle in Europe.

Trikes have caused tautological confusion and simply defied typical two and four-wheel classifications, especially in the 21st century. Regardless, many popular motorcycles and/or automobiles had three wheels.

== Examples ==
=== 17th century ===
- Stephan Farffler's trike

=== 18th century ===
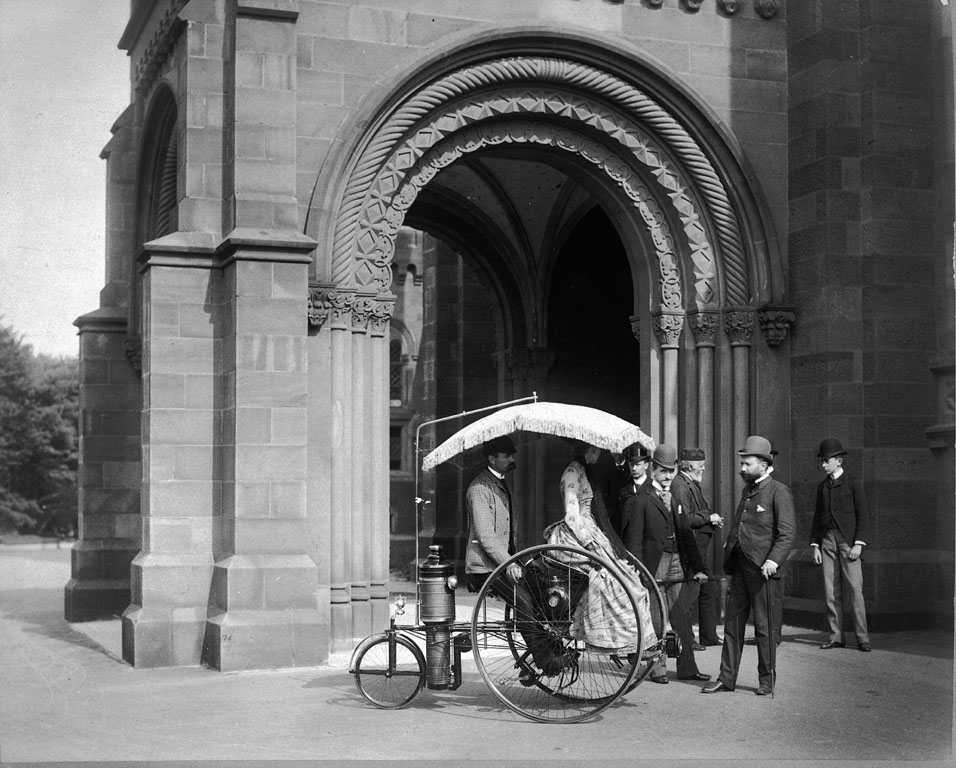
Copeland steam trike in 1888

- Cugnot's fardier à vapeur (steam powered)

=== 19th century ===
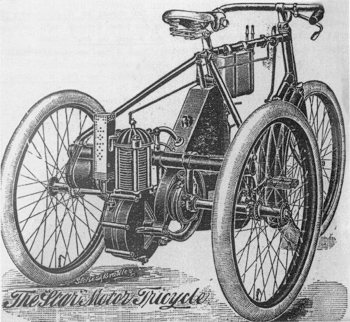
Star motor tricycle 1899

- Ariel 2.25 hp tricycle (1898)
- Benz Patent-Motorwagen (Internal combustion engine) (1886–1893)
- Buckeye gasoline buggy (1891)
- De Dion-Bouton tricycle (1897–1905)
- Eadie motor tricycle, (1898–1900)
- Humber 'Beeston' motor tricycle (1899)
- Léon Bollée Voiturette (1895)
- Long steam tricycle (c. 1880)
- Michaux-Perreaux steam velocipede (1884 Tricycle version)
- Motrice Pia (1894)
- Orient tricycle (1899–1901)
- Star motor tricycle (1899)

=== 20th century ===
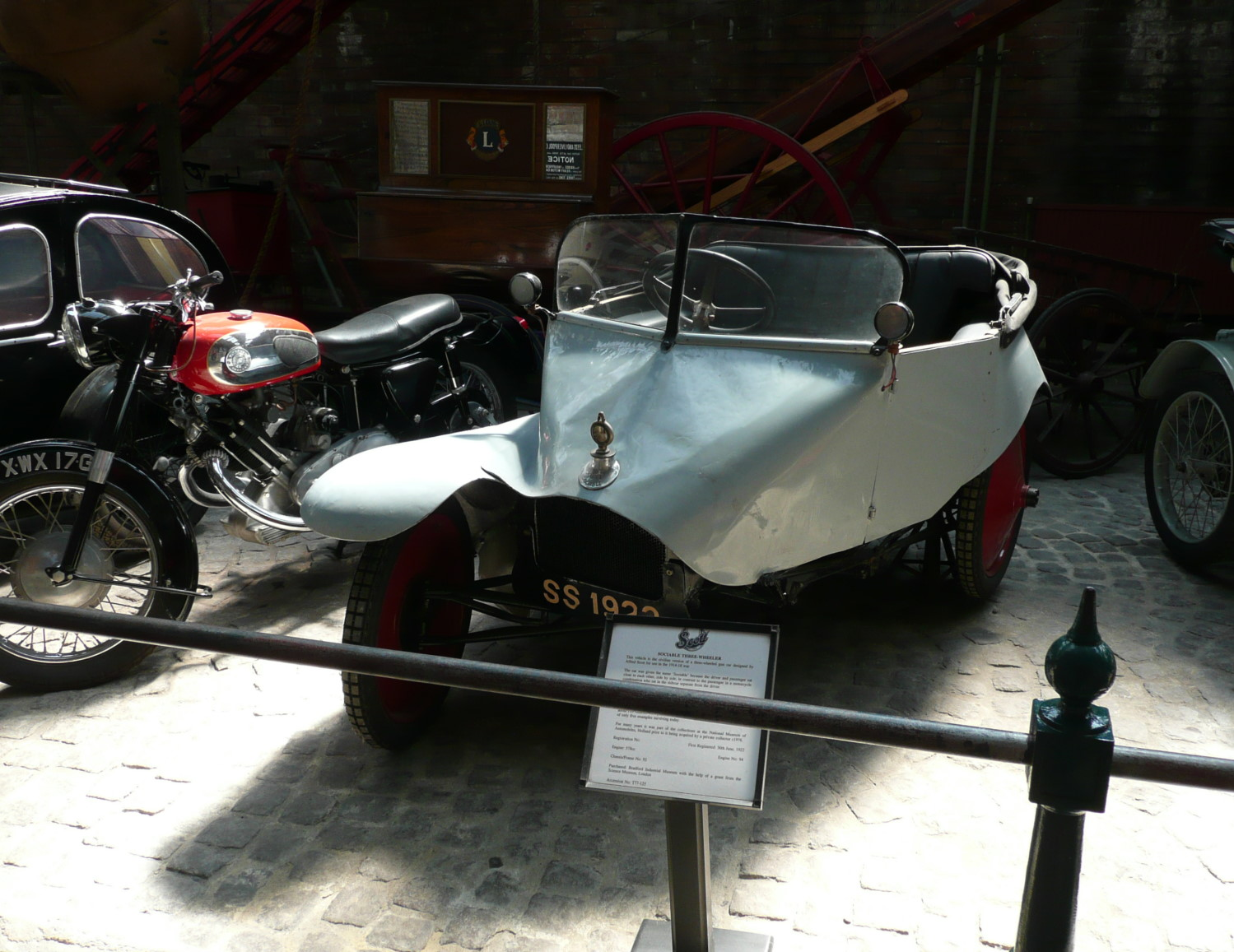
1920s Scott Sociable - note asymmetry: apparently "missing" front left wheel.

- AC Petite
- Alta A200
- BSA Ariel 3 (1970–1973)
- Attica 200
- Bajaj RE (1990s–) (Autoriksha)
- BMW R75 (1941–1945) (w. sidecar)
- Bond Bug
- Bond Minicar
- Brough Superior Austin Four
- Brutsch Mopetta
- Campagna T-Rex (1996–2018)
- CityEl (1987–)
- Coventry-Victor 3-wheeler
- Daihatsu Bee
- David trike cars (1913–1923)
- De Dion-Bouton tricycle (1897–1905)
- Electricar (1920–1921)
- Fend Flitzer (c. 1948)
- Fuldamobil 200
- GG Duetto (1994–1999)
- Goliath Goli
- Grinnall Scorpion (c. 1991)
- Harley-Davidson Servi-Car (1932 to 1973)
- Heinkel Kabine
- HM Vehicles Free-way (1979 to 1982)
- Honda Gyro
- Indian Dispatch-Tow(1930s)
- Indian Tri-Car (circa 1907)(Hendee Manufacturing Co.)
- Invacar
- Isetta (3-wheeled version)
- JZR Trike models
- Krauser Domani
- Lambretta Lambro (1949–1972)
- Lean Machine 1982
- Libelle (microcar)
- Lurquin-Coudert (1906–1914)
- Mercedes-Benz F300 Lifejet

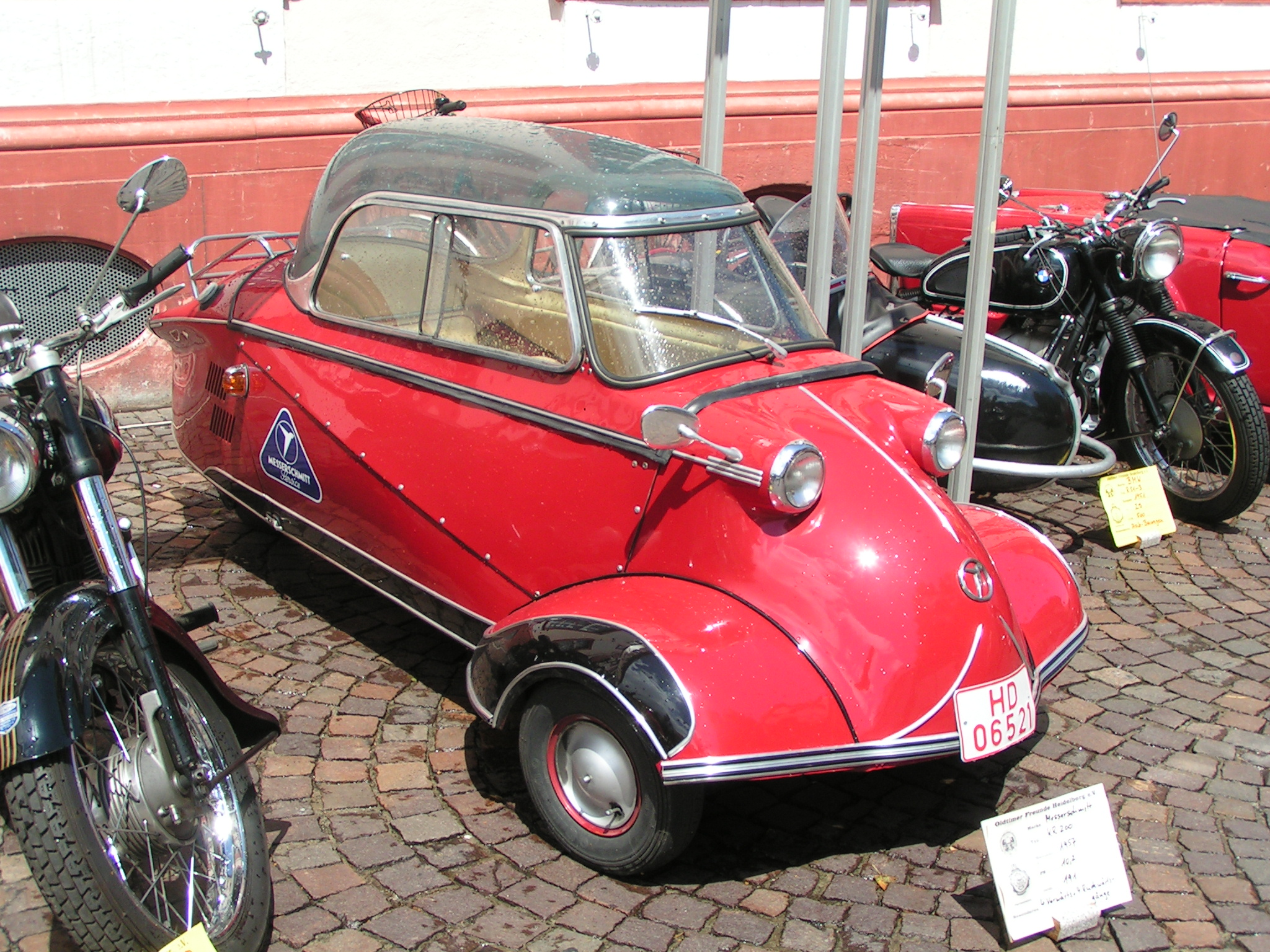
Messerschmitt's KR200, a cabin trike was sold for a nearly a decade in West Germany in the 20th century

- Messerschmitt KR175 (1953–1955) (Messerschmitt Kabinenroller)
- Messerschmitt KR200
- Minneapolis Tri-Car
- Misc Custom Chopper trikes
- Misc. Moto Guzzi Triporteurs
- Morgan 3-Wheeler (pre-war productions)
- Moto Guzzi Trialce
- Möve 101
- Corbin Sparrow
- Norton Big 4 (mc w/ sc)
- Peel P50 (minicar) (1962–65)
- Peel Trident
- Piaggio Ape (1947– )
- Reliant Robin (1973–2002)
- Reliant TW9 (1967–1987)
- Rollfix-Eilwagen
- Scott Sociable
- Scootacar

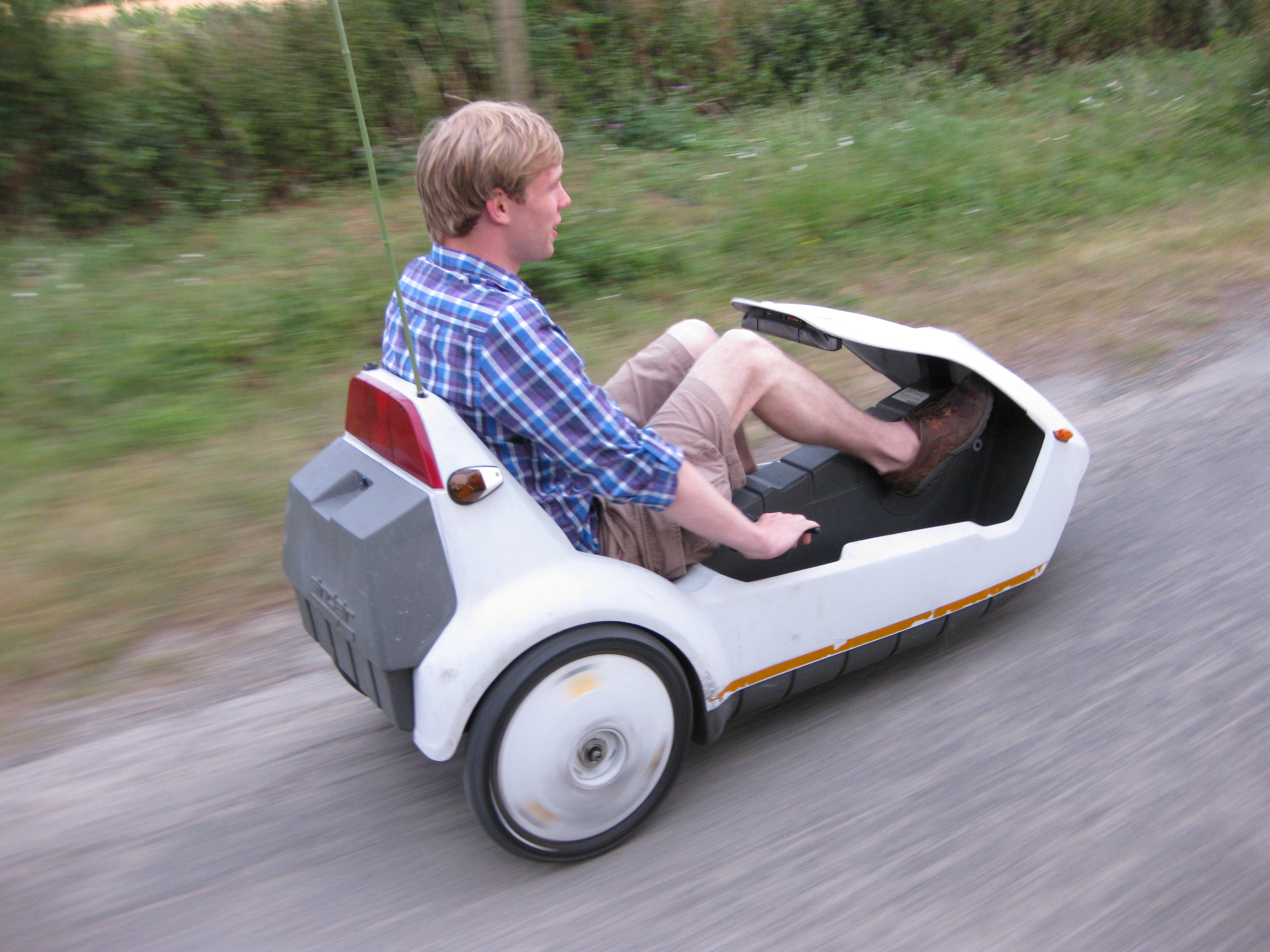
Sinclair C5, an electric trike launched in 1985

- Sinclair C5 (1985)
- Soviet SMZ S-1L
- Spirit of America Formula Shell LSRV. (jet engine)
- Tatra 49 (1929–1930)
- Triking (1970s-)
- Twike (TWIKE 1986+)
- Velorex (1950s–1971)
- Utopian (1914)
- Westcoaster Mailster

=== 21st century ===
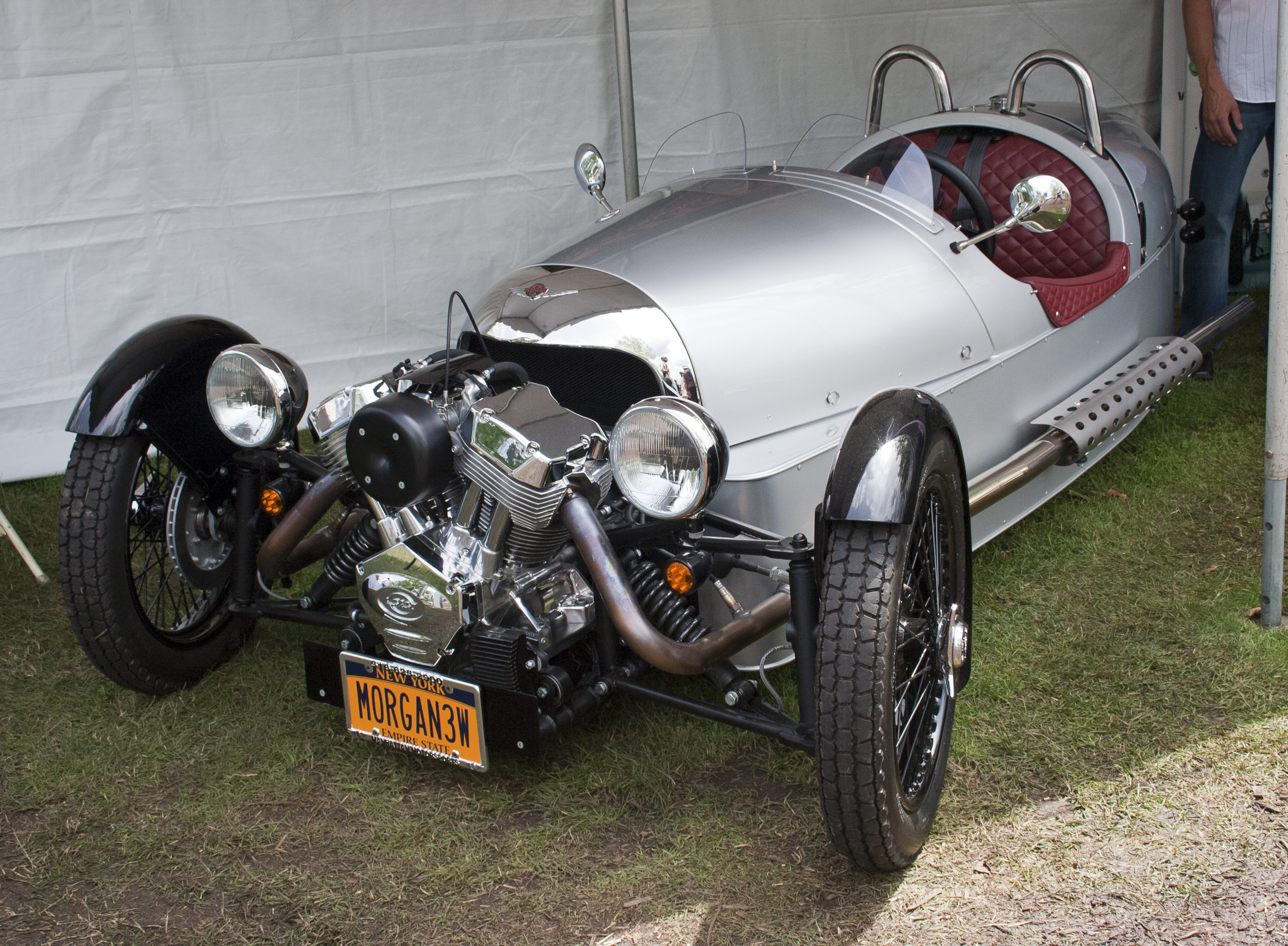
2012 model year Morgan three-wheeler. This was put back into production with a modern engine in the 2010s, after being out-of-production for over half a century. Previous unrequited demand for this vehicle resulted in the similarly styled Triking

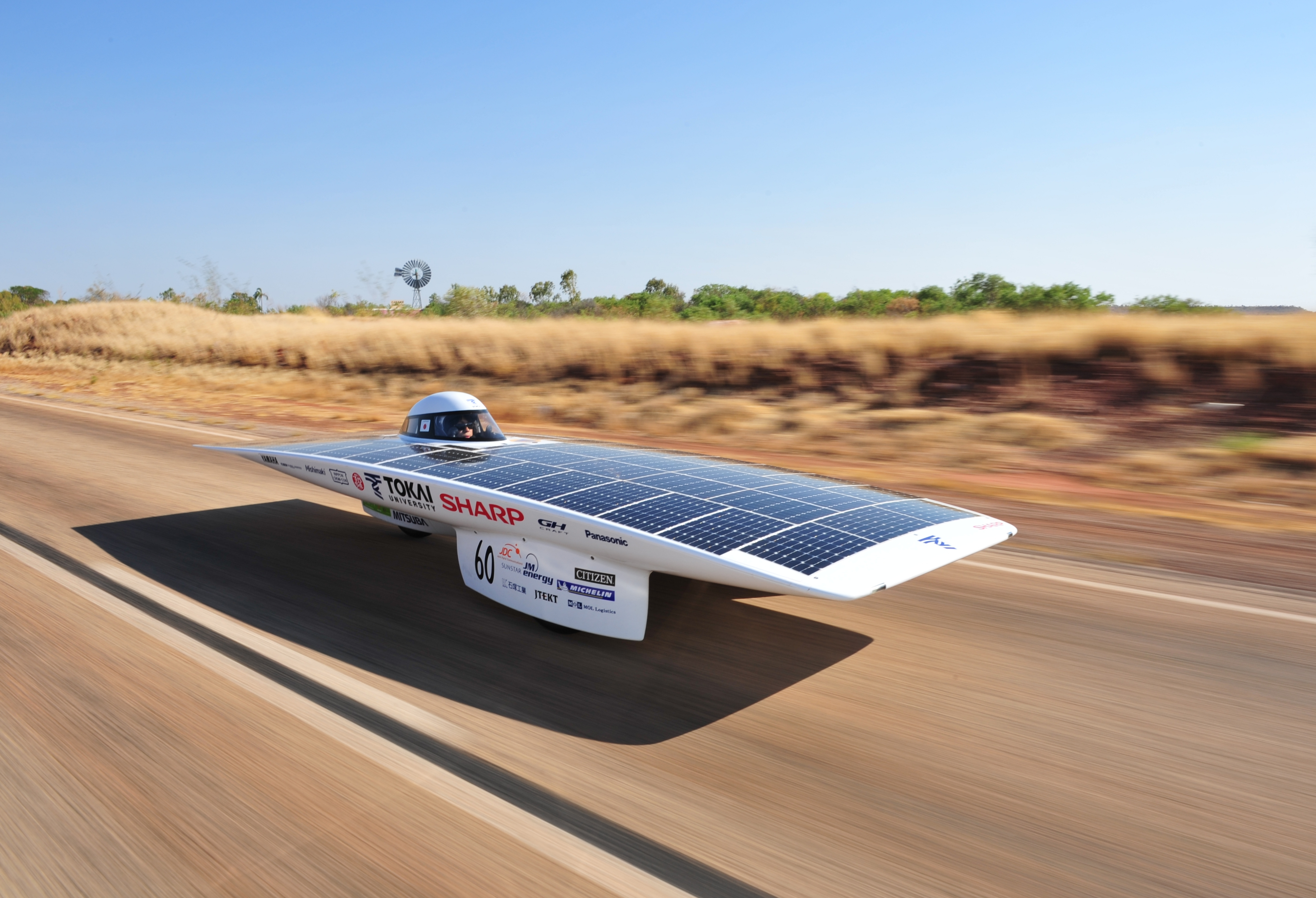
Some Solar cars have been tricycles such as the Tokai Challenger

- AEV 311 EV
- Ape Calessino 200 (new production)
- Aptera (solar electric vehicle)
- Arcimoto
- Bombardier Can-Am Spyder (2007–)
- Brudeli Leanster 625L
- Carver
- Campagna T-Rex (1996–)
- Campagna V13R
- CityEl (1987–)
- ElectraMeccanica Solo
- Elio E-Series
- Elio P models (prototypes)
- eTuk USA (2015–)
- GG Taurus

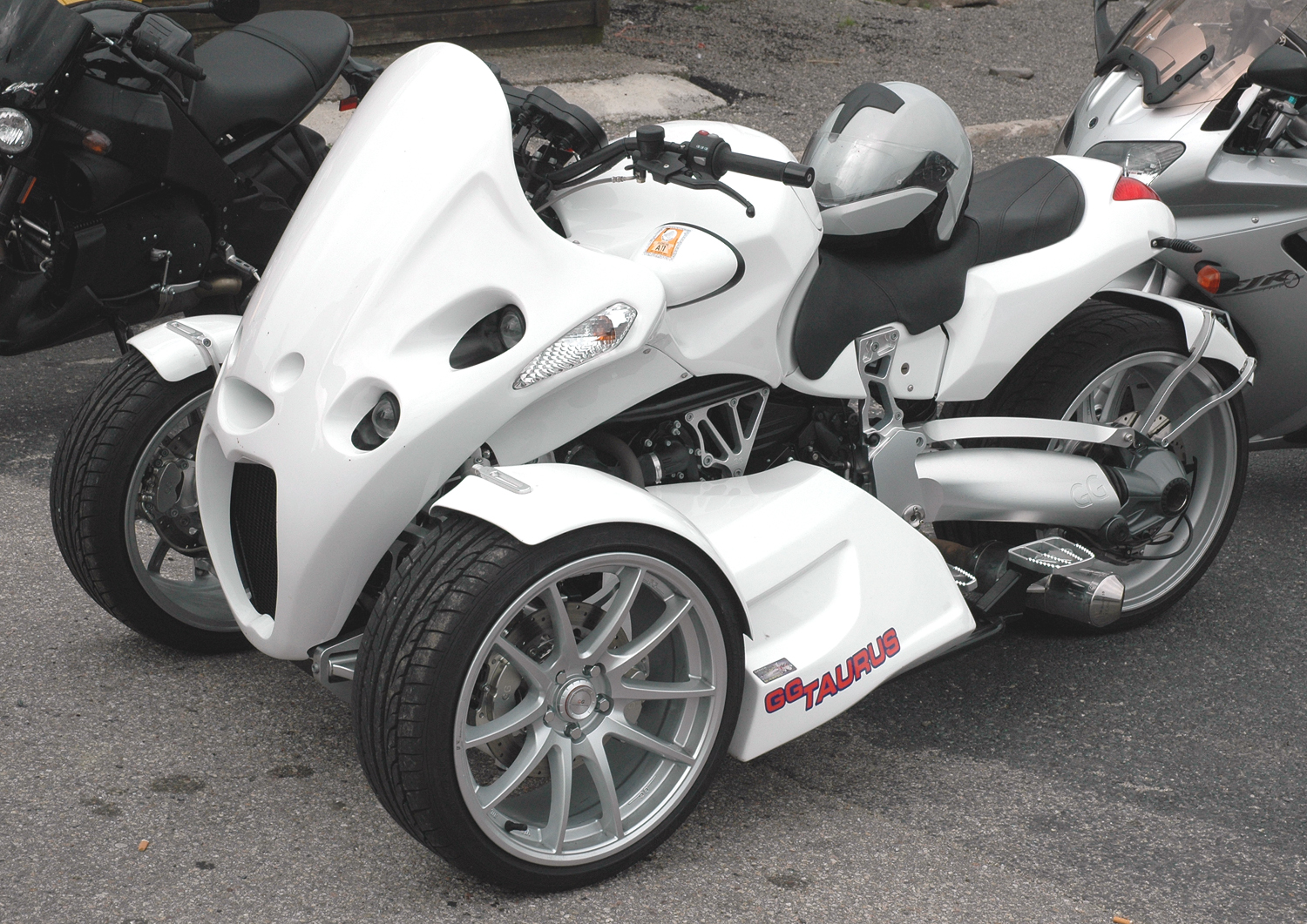
A GG Taurus Trike

- Hannigan BMW 1600 Trike
- Hannigan Harley-Davidson V-Rod Trike
- Harley-Davidson Road Glide 3 Trike (2010–)
- Harley-Davidson Freewheeler (2015–)
- Harley-Davidson Tri Glide Ultra Classic
- Honda Gyro (tilting)
- IRIS
- JZR Trike models
- Kymco CV3 (2018–)
- MEV TR1KE
- Morgan 3-Wheeler (new production 2010s)
- Myers Motors NmG
- Peel P50 (2010– )
- Peugeot Metropolis 400i
- Piaggio Ape (1947– ), MP3 (2006–)
- Polaris Slingshot
- Quadro 350S three-wheel scooter
- Rewaco RF-1 Trike
- Roadsmith Trikes
- Scorpion P6
- Stimson Sting (2002–2007)
- Tanom Invader TC-3
- Terracraft Supertrike
- Tilting Motor Works Tilting V-Max Trike
- Tokai Challenger
- Toyota i-Road (2013)
- Traverston Striker
- Tri Pod GII by Mynrva (2012-) Bandit 1250, ZX14R based
- Triking
- Trirod F3
- Twisted Trike
- Uno III
- Vanderhall Laguna trike

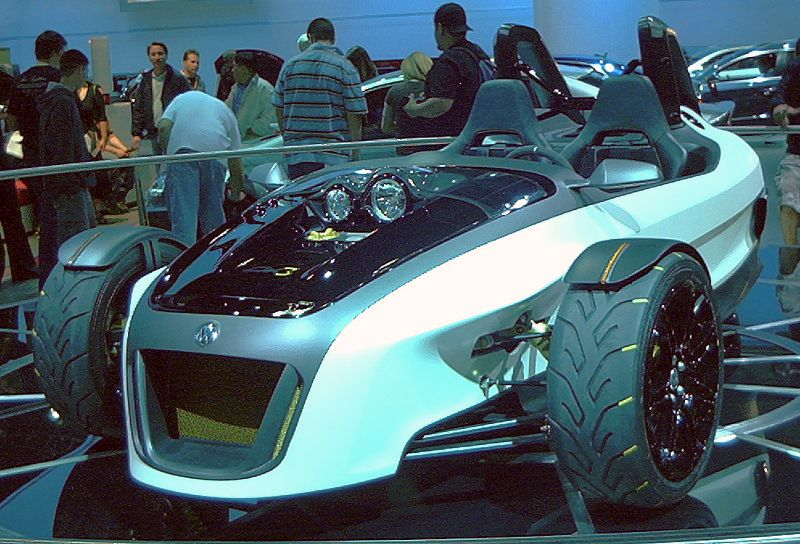
VW GX3

- Veemo by VeloMetro Mobility – Fully enclosed, pedal-electric trike, regulated as an electric bicycle in North America.
- Venom SS
- Venom X
- Volkswagen GX3 (concept trike)
- Yamaha Niken – trike with the Yamaha MT-09 engine, for European and Asian markets
- Yamaha RX1 snowmobile custom conversion to street trike
- Yamaha Tricity
- ZAP Xebra (2006–2009)
- ZAP Alias
- ZTR Trike

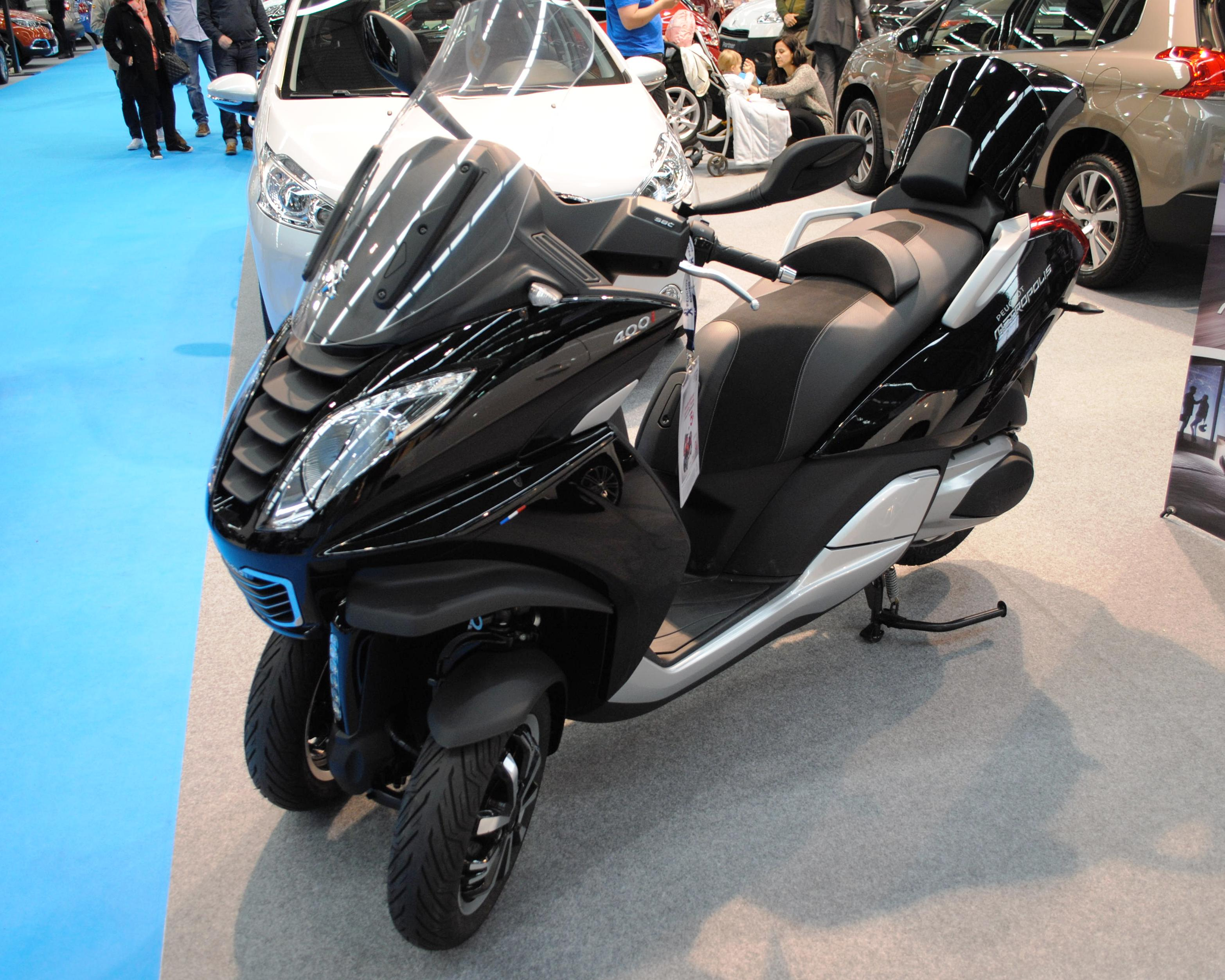
Peugeot Metropolis

== Miscellaneous ==
Another idea is the flike, a sort of flying motorcycle/helicopter.

Whike are sail-powered trikes, which may or may not be motorized depending if one considers a sail to be a type of motorization.

There is another arrangement of three-wheel, with the wheels in a line; this is so far pretty rare.

=== Motorcycles with two sidecars ===
Motorcycles with sidecars often have three wheels, but there has been some use of two sidecars (one on each side of a motorcycle, not a sidecar that seats two which is another thing). In one case the use of flexible type sidecars allow the center-line motor bicycle wheels to stay on the ground, and providing adequate handling

== Gallery ==
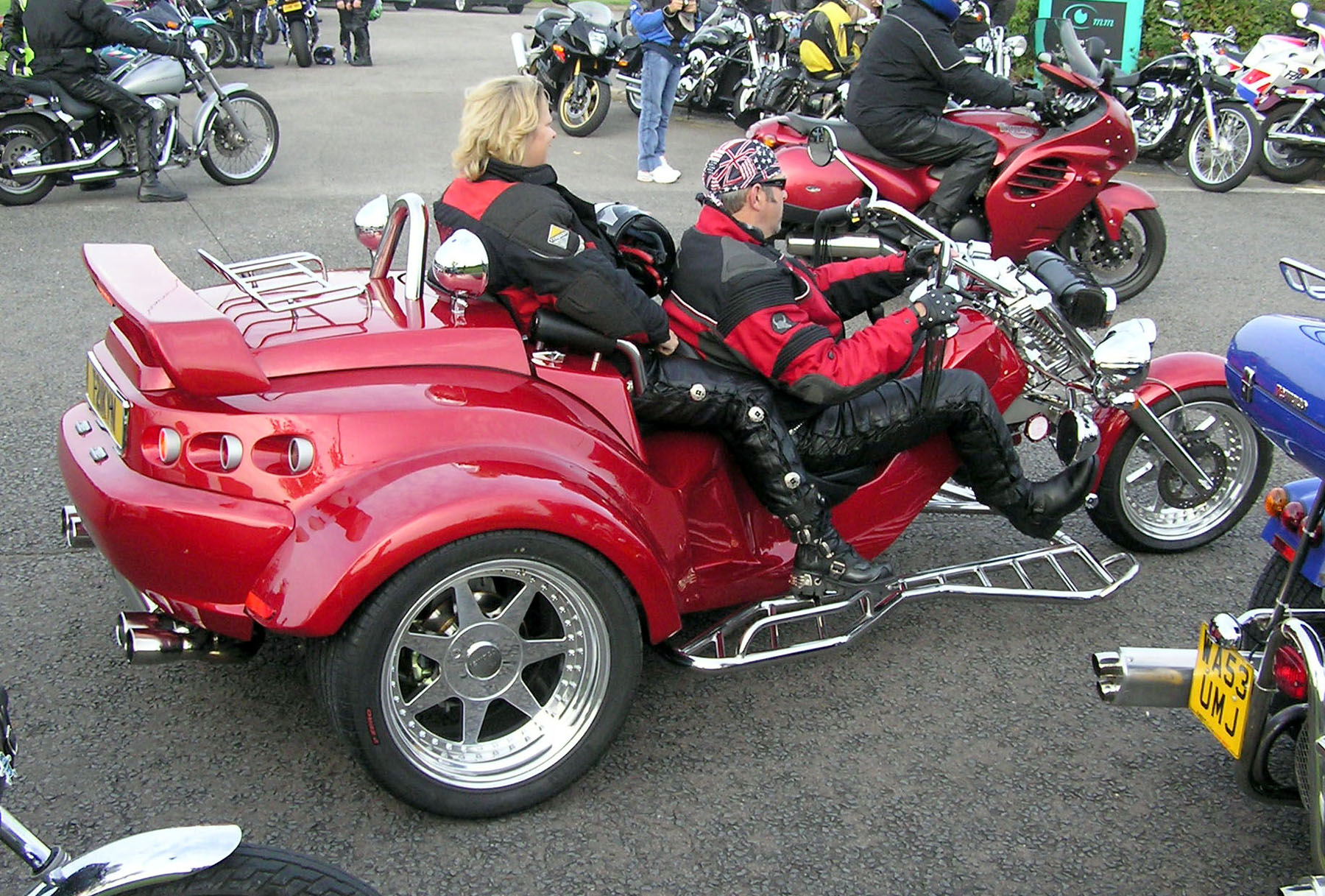
Rewaco trike in the UK

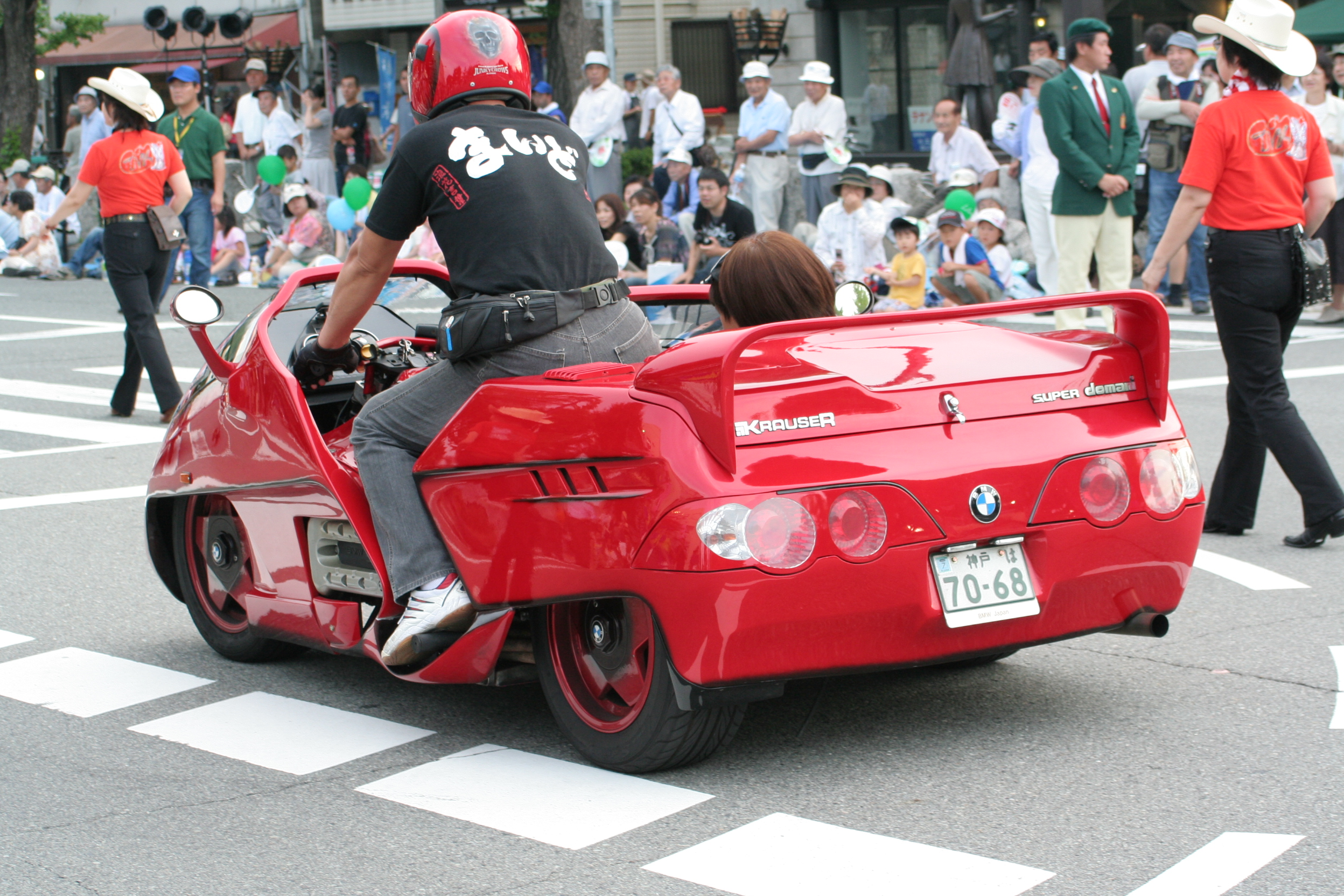
Krauser-BMW Domani, incorporating elements of both cars and motorcycles

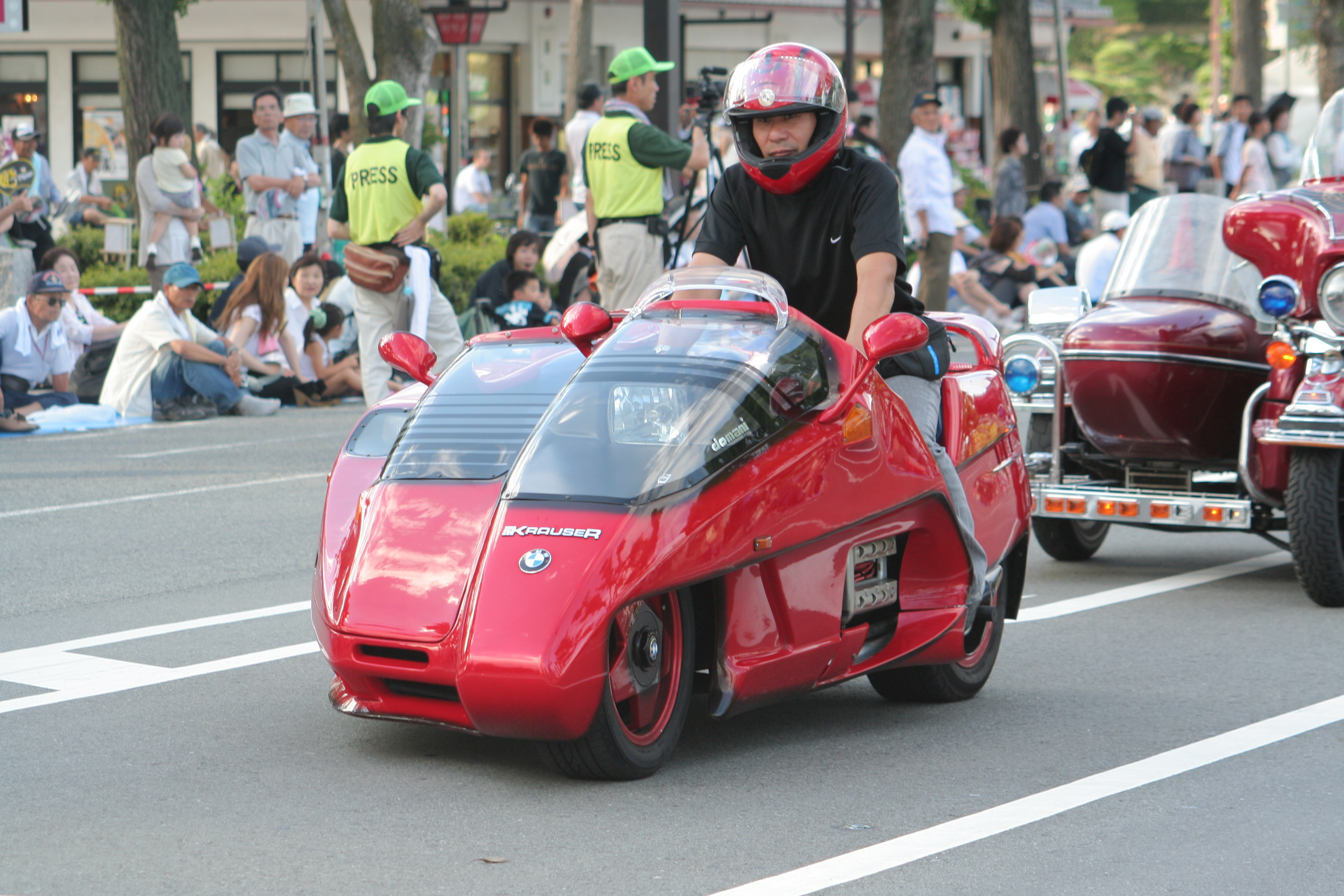
Domani trike

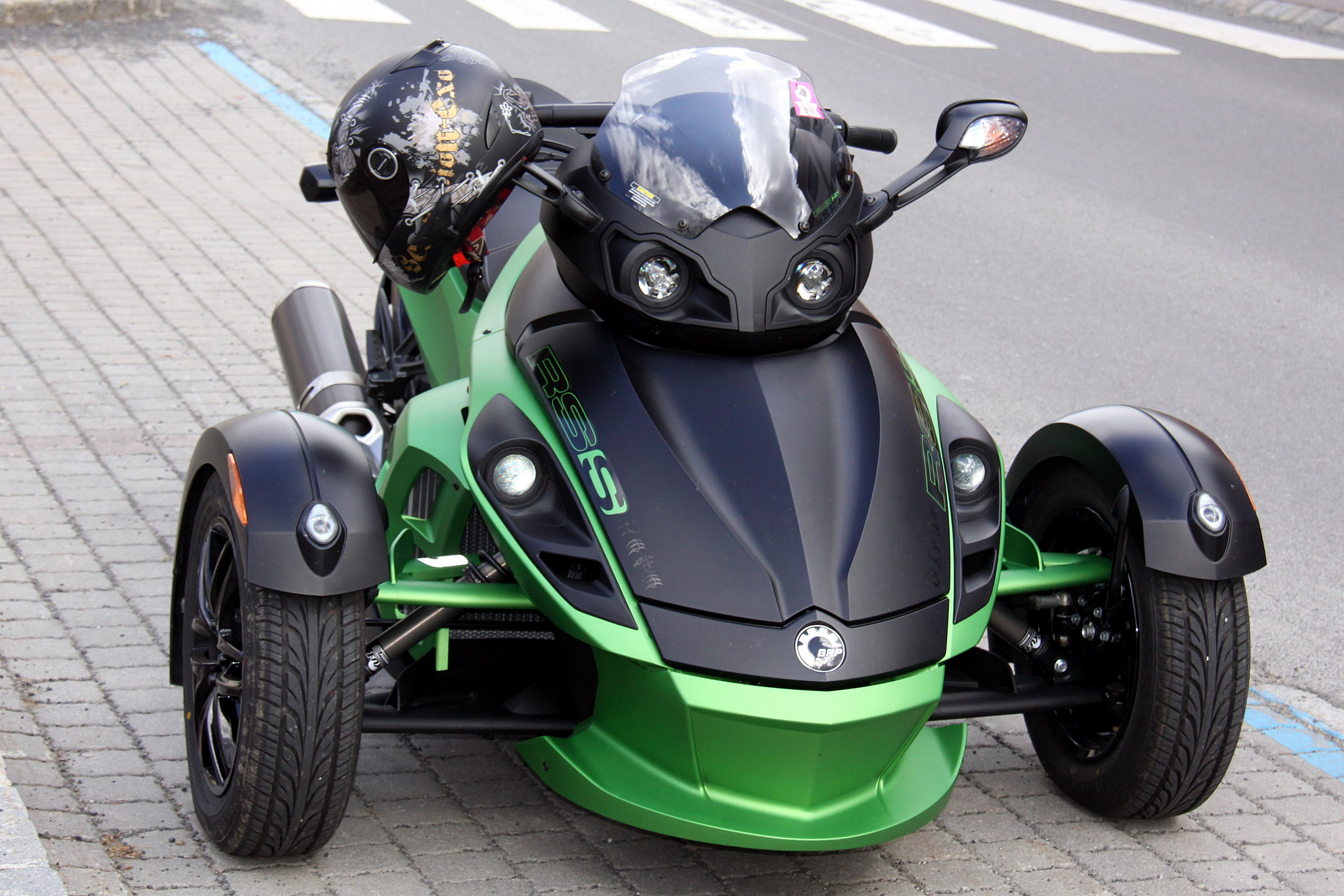
Can-Am Spyder from the front

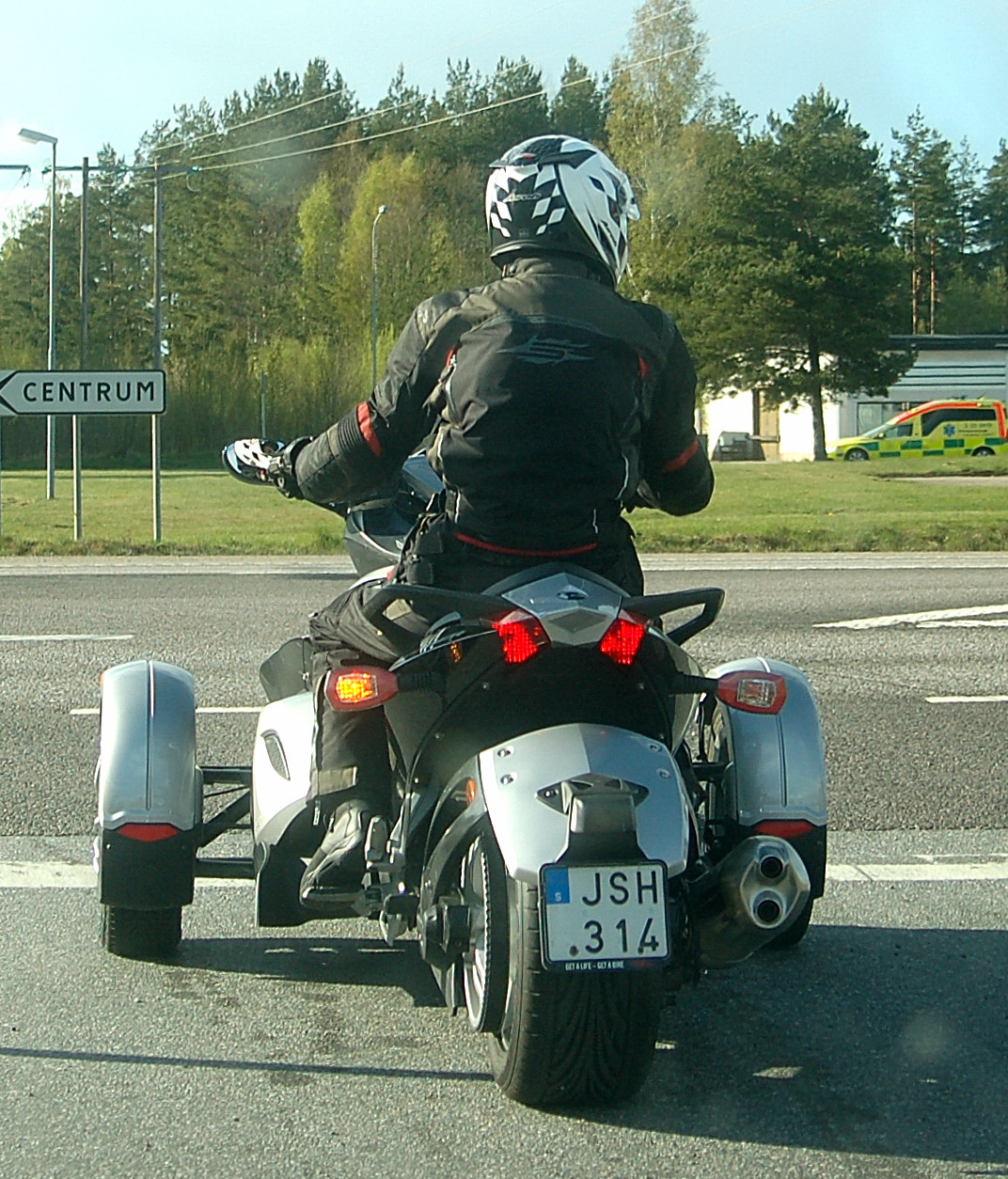
Can-Am Spyder from the rear

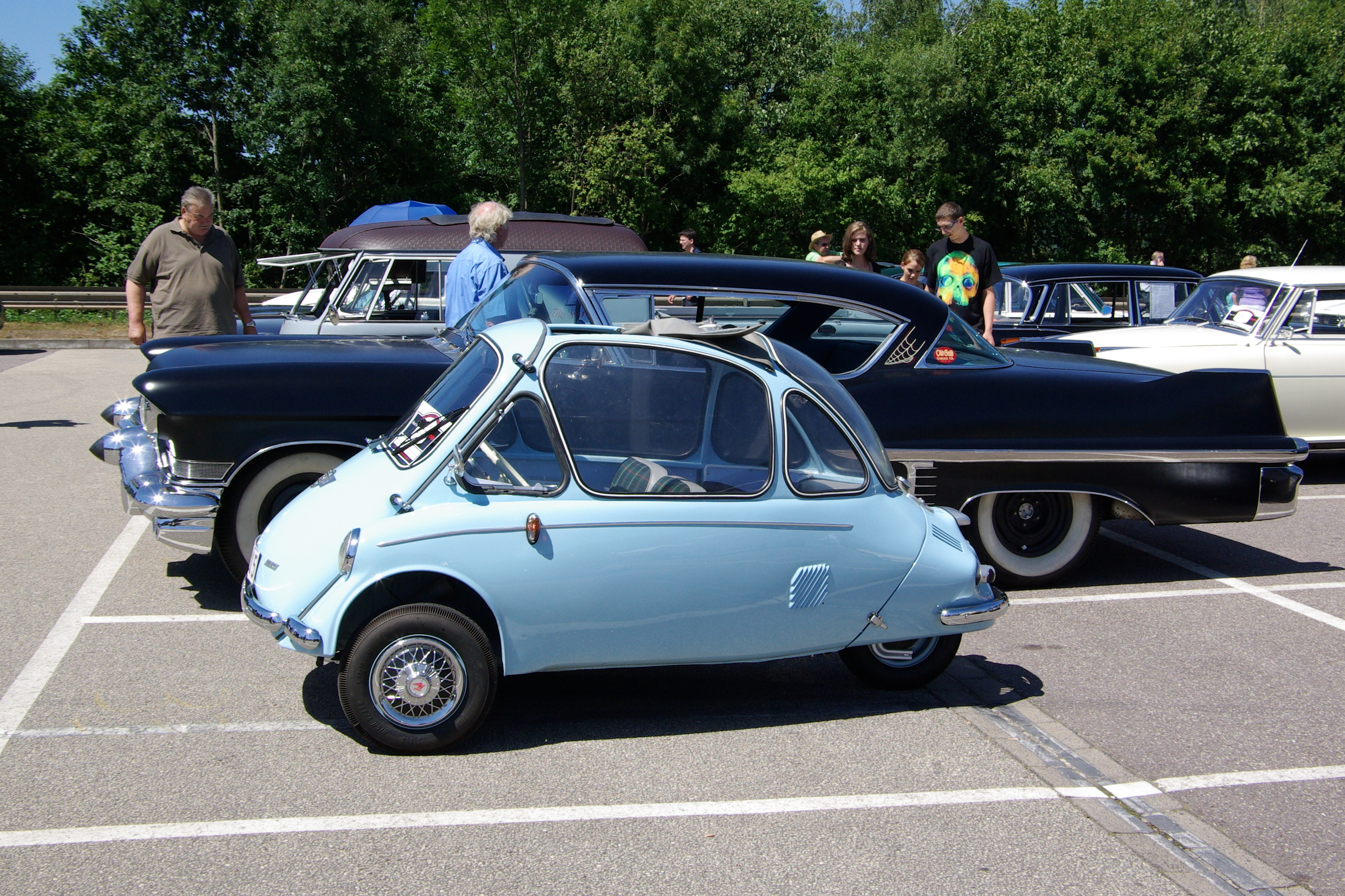
Heinkel trike-car

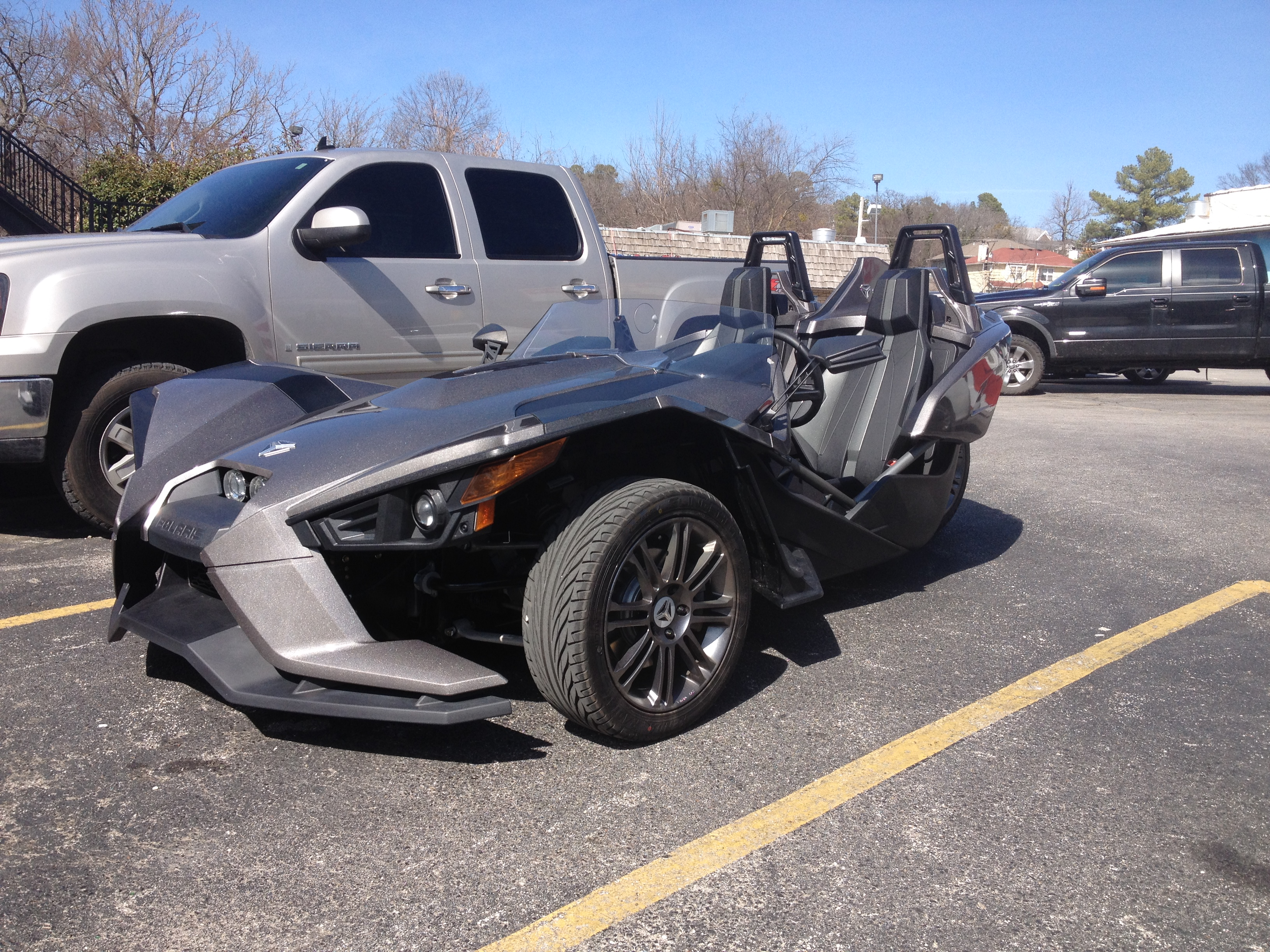
Polaris Slingshot

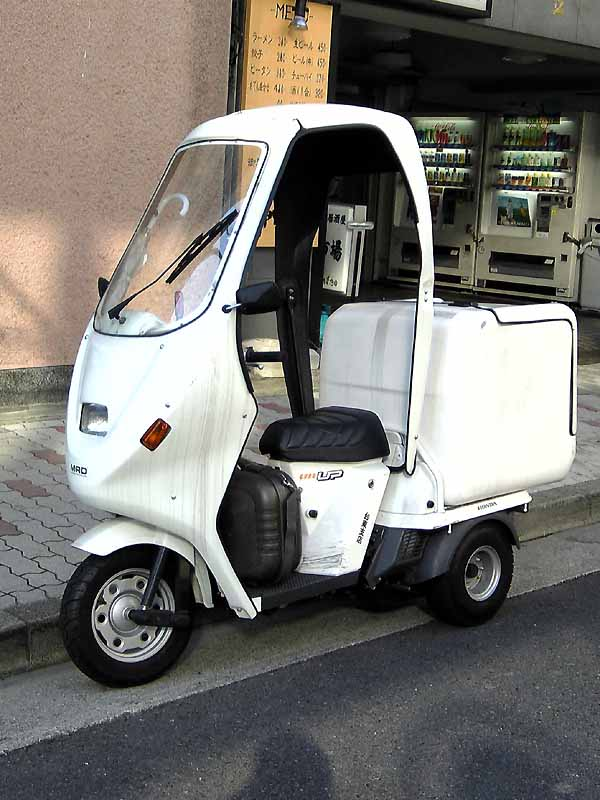
Honda Gyro UP

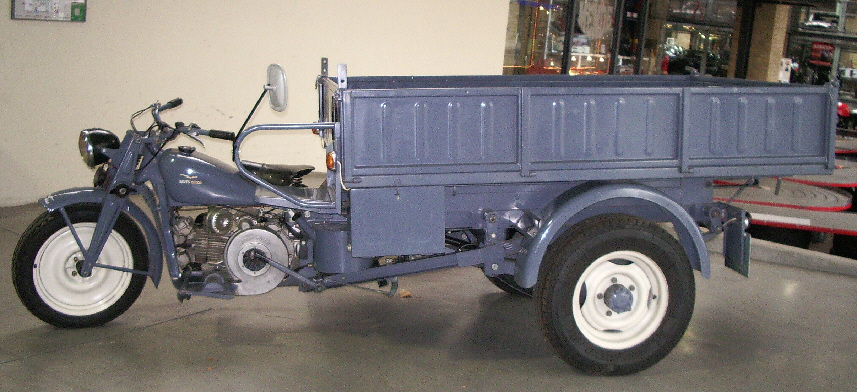
Moto Guzzi vehicle

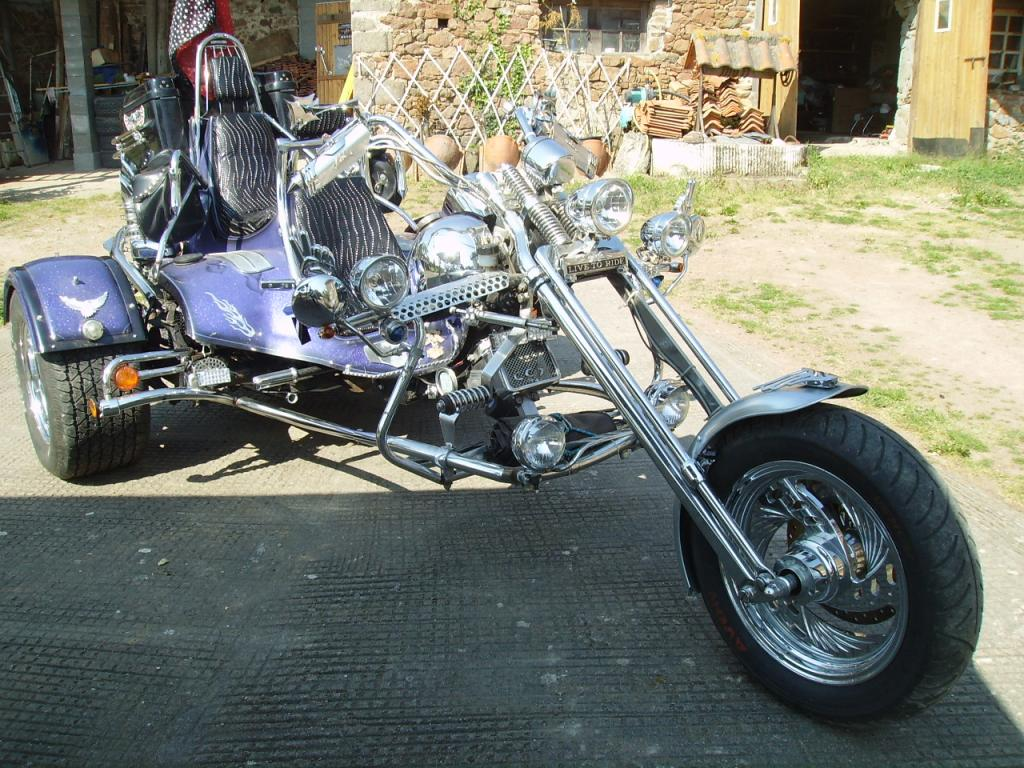
Custom chopper trike

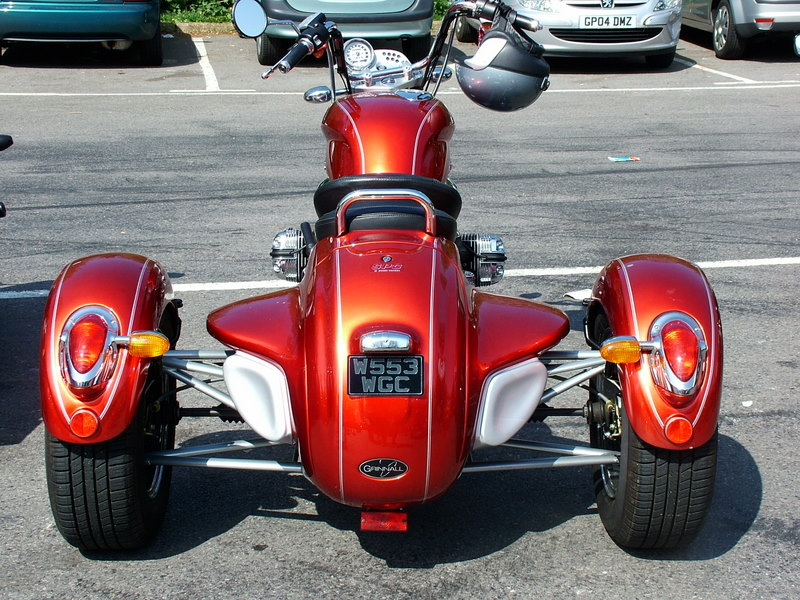
BMW R1200C aftermarket conversion to a trike

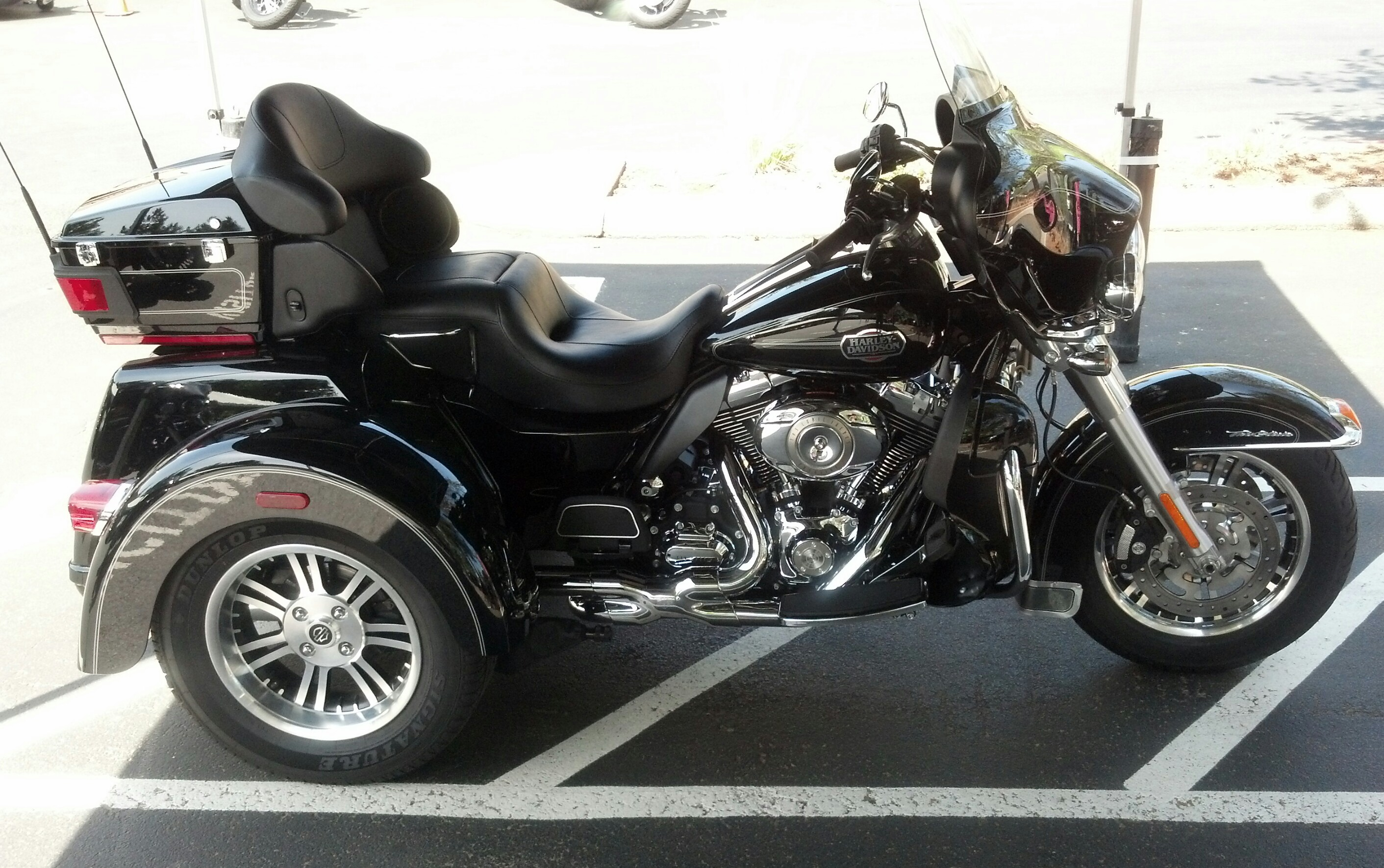
Harley-Davidson Tri-Glide

== See also ==
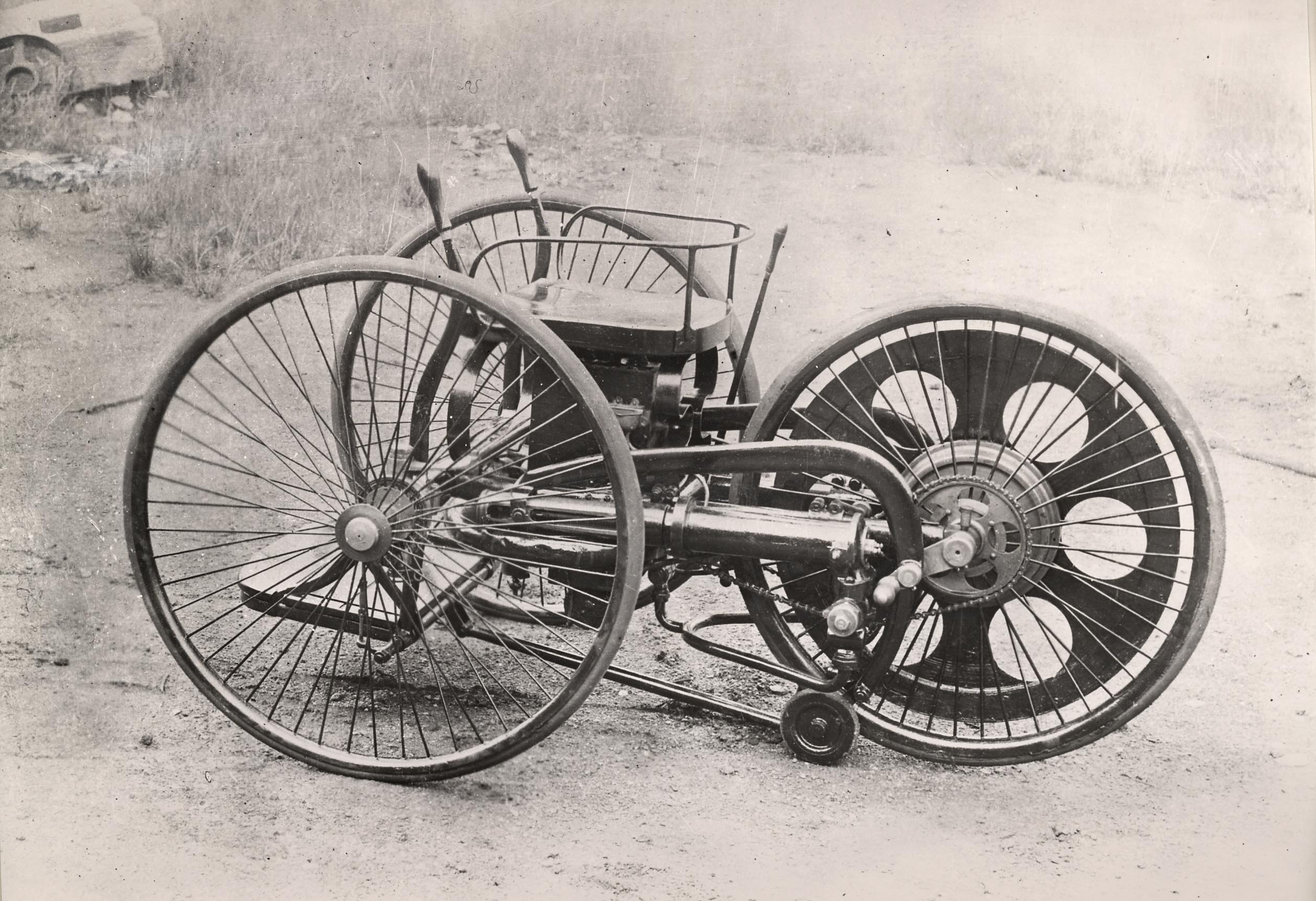
Butler's Patent Velocycle 1887

- Motorized tricycle
- Steam tricycle
- Cyclecar
- Three-wheeler (three wheel vehicles including animal, human, or motors)
- Tilting three-wheeler (related to the suspension of the vehicle)
- All-terrain vehicle (ATVs) (variety of wheel number and configurations)
- Go-kart
- Off road go-kart and Dune buggies (typically 4 wheels plus roll cage)
- Chopper (motorcycle)

Motor bicycle related:

- Feet forwards motorcycle
- Scooter (motorcycle)
- Cabin motorcycle
- Sidecar
- Velomobile (human-powered car)
- Auto rickshaw (general term that includes many kinds of trike/three-wheelers etc.)
- Types of motorcycles
- Motorcycle motor powered car
