= Myers EV =

Automobile company

Myers Motors
- Industry: Automotive
- Founded: 1996; 26 years ago
- Founder: Dana Myers; Mike Corbin (former); Tom Corbin (former)
- Headquarters: Tallmadge, Ohio, U.S.
- Website: https://myersev.com

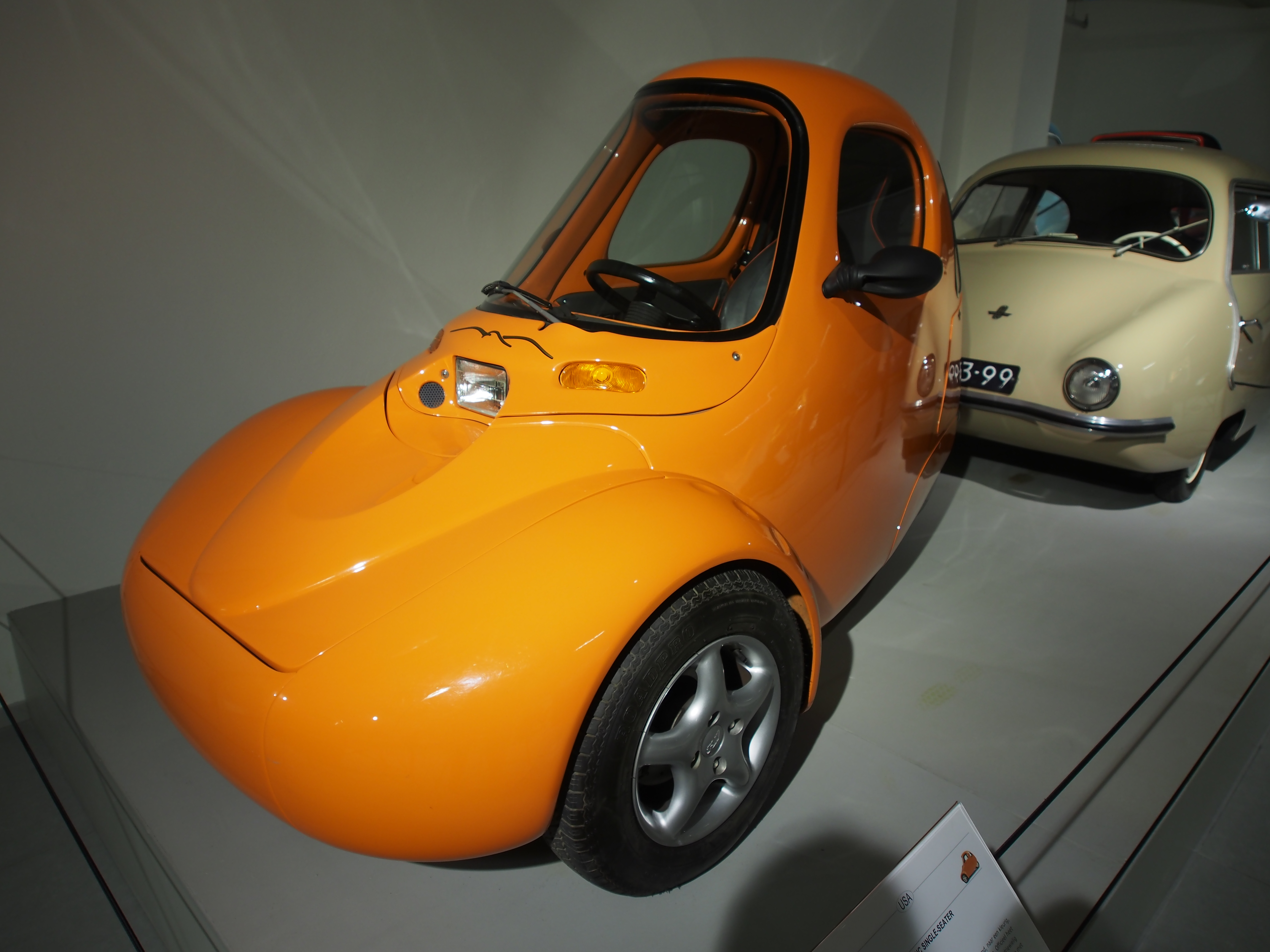
2000 Corbin Sparrow

Myers EV, (formally Myers Motors and before that, Corbin Motors) is a small automobile company operating in Tallmadge, Ohio. Their original vehicle, the Myers Motors NmG (which stands for "No More Gas") was a single-passenger, three-wheeled, battery electric vehicle designed specifically for commuting and city driving. It was initially produced by Corbin Motors as the Sparrow. It is a Personal Electric Vehicle (PEV).

In 2009, the company was developing the Duo, a two-passenger 3 wheeled EV with a similar design, but using more advanced battery technology.

In 2018, Myers Motors changed its name to Myers EV and started taking pre-orders for the 2-passenger "half-car" with tandem seating, the Point5, planned for a late 2024 start of production.

== History ==
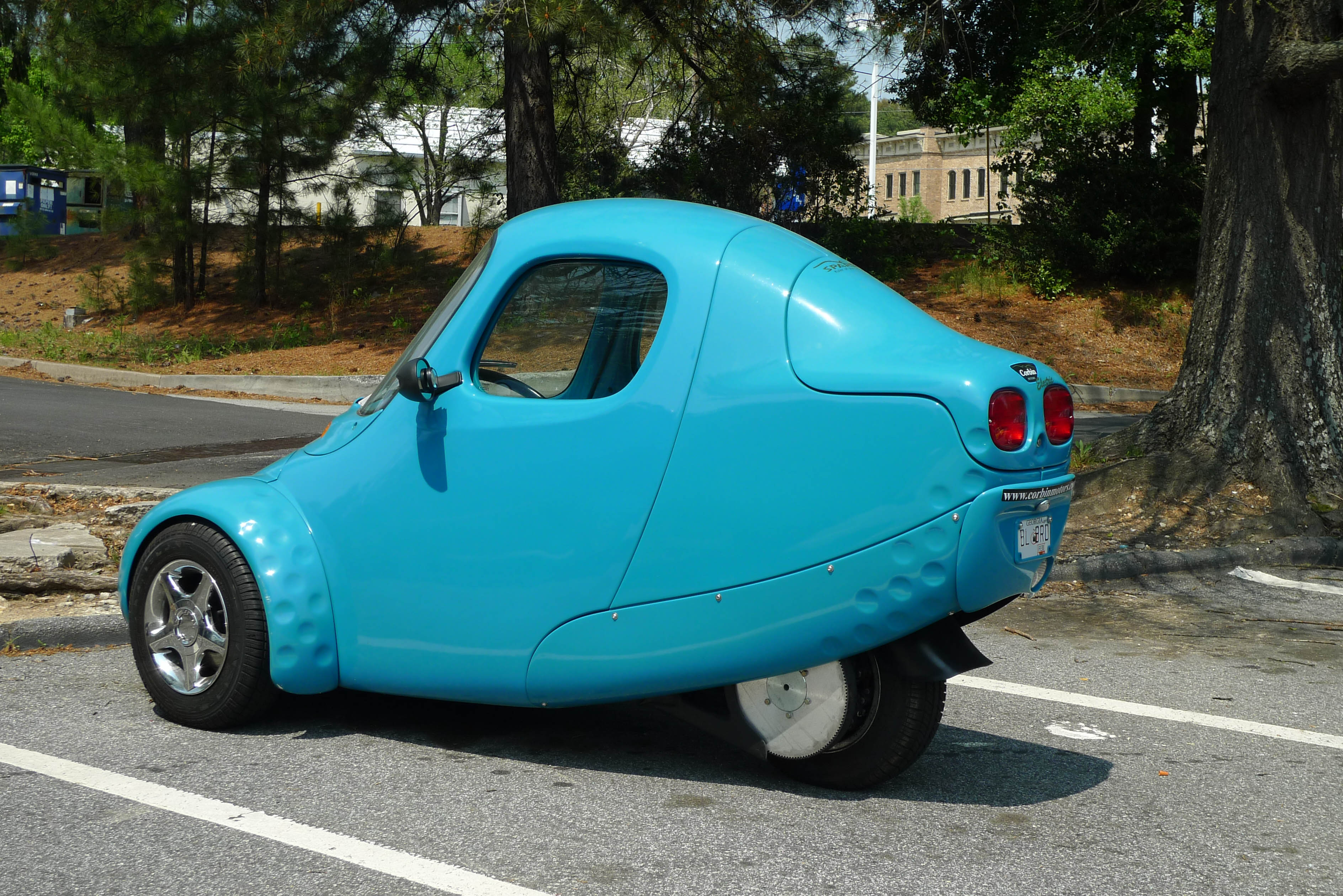
Corbin Sparrow

Corbin Motors was a manufacturer of sporty pure electric, gas efficient and hybrid vehicles. The company was founded by Mike Corbin and his son, Tom Corbin.

In January 1996, Corbin Motors began work on developing an electric vehicle. The Sparrow passed final testing for Department of Transportation certification in April 1999. In September of that year, the Sparrow production line began manufacturing multiple vehicles in Hollister, California. They also made the Corbin Merlin that was available as both coupé and roadster.

Fewer than 300 Sparrows were produced. Corbin Motors filed for Chapter 7 bankruptcy on March 31, 2003, effectively killing the immediate future of the Corbin Sparrow. A bankruptcy court passed the Corbin assets to Ron Huch's company, Phoenix Environmental Motors, which tried to revive the Sparrow. There were discussions about the production being continued by SLP Canada. On August 5, 2004, Ohio businessman Dana Myers bought the Sparrow interests from Ron Huch, forming the new company Myers Motors.

In 2018, Myers Motors changed its name to Myers EV and started taking pre-orders for the 2-passenger "half-car" with tandem seating, the Point5, planned for a late 2024 start of production.

== Products ==
=== NmG ===
The new company upgraded the Sparrow, renamed it the MM NmG ("No more Gas"), and started selling it in April 2006. In June 2008, the website listed a price of $29,995 without taxes or shipping. In 2009, the NmG began to use lithium batteries which Myers Motors claims doubled its driving range to 60 miles between charges.

=== Duo ===
In October 2009, Myers Motors announced that a 2-passenger model was planned to be introduced in the 4th Quarter of 2010. Myers Motors ran a naming competition for its 2-passenger vehicle and selected the name Duo, an acronym for "Doesn't Use Oil".

The Myers Motors company's next vehicle, the Duo, was to be a two-passenger electric vehicle with a base model range of 60 miles, which at one time was planned to be available in 2011. The company appeared to still be taking pre-orders for the Duo in 2016. However, in late 2013 with the end of the EV rebate for 3 wheeled vehicles, their home page started promoting only their new crowd funding effort for a 4-wheeled car.

=== Point5 ===
In 2018, Myers Motors changed its name to Myers EV and started taking pre-orders for the 2-passenger "half-car" with tandem seating, the Point5.

The Point5 is specified to have a top speed of 75 mph and an estimated base range of 70 to 100 miles, depending on the battery selected.

Myers EV states production of the Point5 and a larger 2 side by side seater redesigned Duo is planned for the fall of 2024.

== See also ==
- William Garrison (geographer) – studied concept of narrow vehicles
- List of motorized trikes
- Three-wheeler
