= JZR =

JZR may refer to:

- Jazeera Airways, a Kuwaiti airline, ICAO airline code JZR
- JZR Trikes, a British producer of trikes
