= HMV (disambiguation) =

HMV is an international music and entertainment retailer.

HMV may also refer to:

== Business ==
- His Master's Voice (disambiguation), various incarnations of the "His Master's Voice" symbol have been abbreviated to "HMV"
- HMV's Poll of Polls, the HMV retailer's year-end poll of music albums

== Transportation ==
- Heavy maintenance visit in aircraft maintenance checks
- IATA code for Hemavan Airport in Sweden
- Karia HM V, a Finnish tram
- HM Vehicles Free-way, American automobile manufacturer, vehicles sometimes called "HMV Freeway"

== Language ==
- Hmong Dô language, spoken in Vietnam
