= List of microcars by country of origin: D =

== List ==
Country	Automobile Name	Manufacturer	Engine Make/Capacity	Seats	Year	Other information
Denmark	CityEl	El Trans A/S Randers	electric motor 2.5 kW (3 hp)	1	1987-1992	
