= Leanster =

Three-wheeled vehicle

Leanster Brudeli 625L is a three-wheeled vehicle, with two wheels in front and one rear wheel. The vehicle is best described as something in between a motorcycle and ATV-quad. It has corners which lean in, like a motorcycle, while at the same time possessing a lot of the stability and a shorter brake length like a sport quad. It is intended both for on-road and off-road use.

It was designed by the Norwegian designer Atle Stubberud from Soon Design.

== See also ==
- List of motorized trikes
