= Stimson Sting =

Overview
- Production: 2002–2007
- Designer: Barry Stimson

Body and chassis
- Layout: 2 front wheels, 1 rear wheel Front-engine, rear-wheel-drive

Powertrain
- Engine: Suzuki 1157 cc (70.6 cu in)

The Stimson Sting is a three-wheeled car designed by Barry Stimson. Available as a kit car, it was introduced in the UK in 2002 and continued in production until 2007, although only one was built in that time. It has two wheels at the front and two seats.

The Sting uses the 1157 cc (70.6 cu in) powertrain of the Suzuki Bandit 1200 motorcycle, giving it a 0–60 mph (0–97 km/h) acceleration of under four seconds.

== See also ==
- List of motorized trikes
