= Volkswagen GX3 =

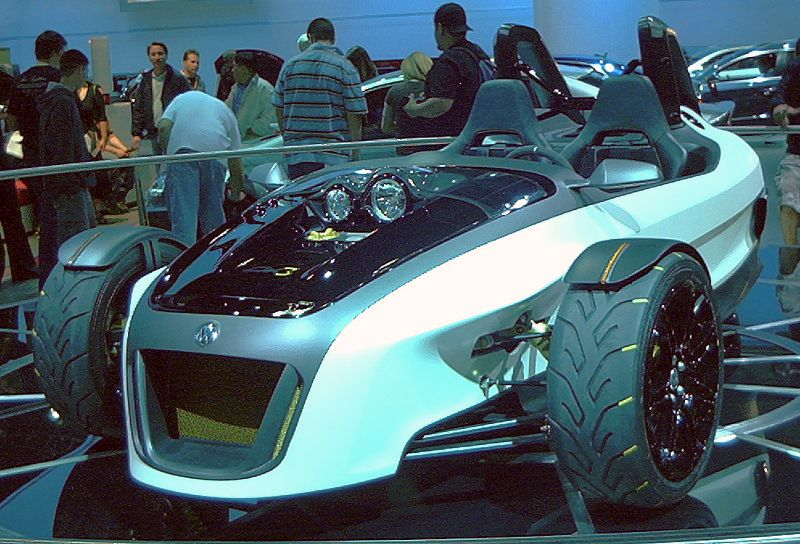

Overview
- Manufacturer: Volkswagen/Lotus
- Production: 2006

Body and chassis
- Class: Sports car (S)
- Body style: 3-wheel, 2-seat roadster

Powertrain
- Engine: 1.6 L DOHC I4
- Transmission: 6-speed manual

The Volkswagen GX3 was a concept car created by project Moonraker, which was initiated by Stefan Liske, former director of group product strategy at Volkswagen. The GX3 was first shown at the 2006 Greater Los Angeles Auto Show. It was considered an unusual concept, since it was three-wheeled and sometimes considered more of a motorcycle rather than a car, but it did feature good performance for a projected cost of only about US$17,000.

== Design and specifications ==
The GX3 used a transverse-mounted 1.6 L I4 engine from the VW Lupo GTI. This engine gave the GX3 an output of 125 PS (92 kW) and 152 N·m (112 ft·lbf) of torque. The GX3 could go from 0–100 km/h in 5.7 seconds and had a top speed of 200 km/h (125 mph). It used a six-speed manual transmission.

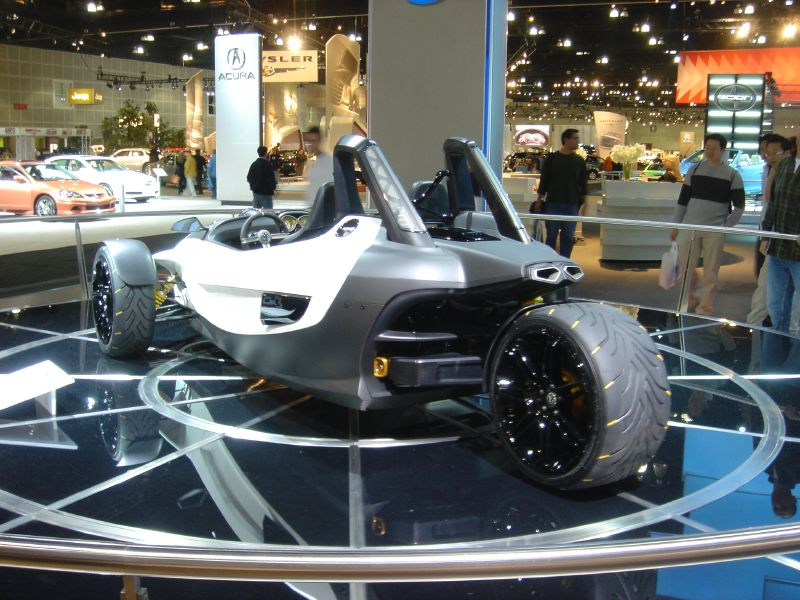
Rear view

The design of the GX3 was typical, with a front double wishbone suspension, tubular steel space frame and laminated body panels. The concept was of a rare type, with two seats and three wheels. The GX3 lacked a roof or windshield, and was intended mainly for fair weather environments, as a "weekend car". The design of the interior was minimalist and functional.

== Reaction and issues ==
=== Public reaction ===
There was considerable speculation as to possible production of the GX3; Volkswagen fueled this with the announcement that production would depend on the public reaction to the concept.

=== Issues ===
However, in spite of the positive public response, and intensive chassis development by Lotus Cars for production, Volkswagen later concluded that it would not be able to sell the GX3 without costly, and complex redesigns that would alienate Volkswagen's target market and increase price above the proposed US$17,000 base price.

The company cited possible safety issues that could have led to product liability lawsuits, and decided that the legal concerns as is impossible to made it into production.

== See also ==
- List of motorized trikes
- Polaris Slingshot
