= Myers Motors NmG =

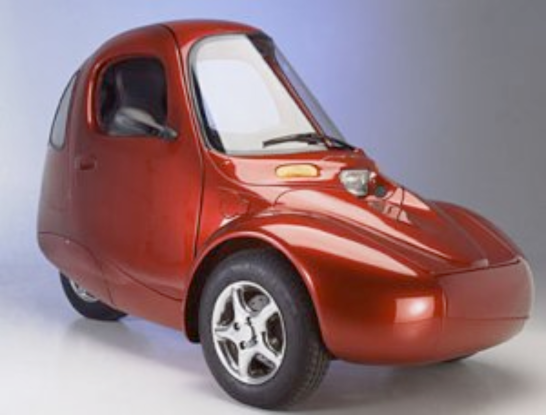

Overview
- Manufacturer: Corbin Motors (1999–2003); Myers Motors (2005–2012)
- Production: 1999–2003; 2005–2012

Body and chassis
- Class: Battery electric microcar
- Body style: 2-door coupe ('Pizza Butt'); 1-door ('Jelly Bean')

Dimensions
- Wheelbase: 72 in (1,829 mm)
- Length: 96 in (2,438 mm)
- Width: 48 in (1,219 mm)
- Height: 57 in (1,448 mm)
- Curb weight: 1,350 lb (610 kg)

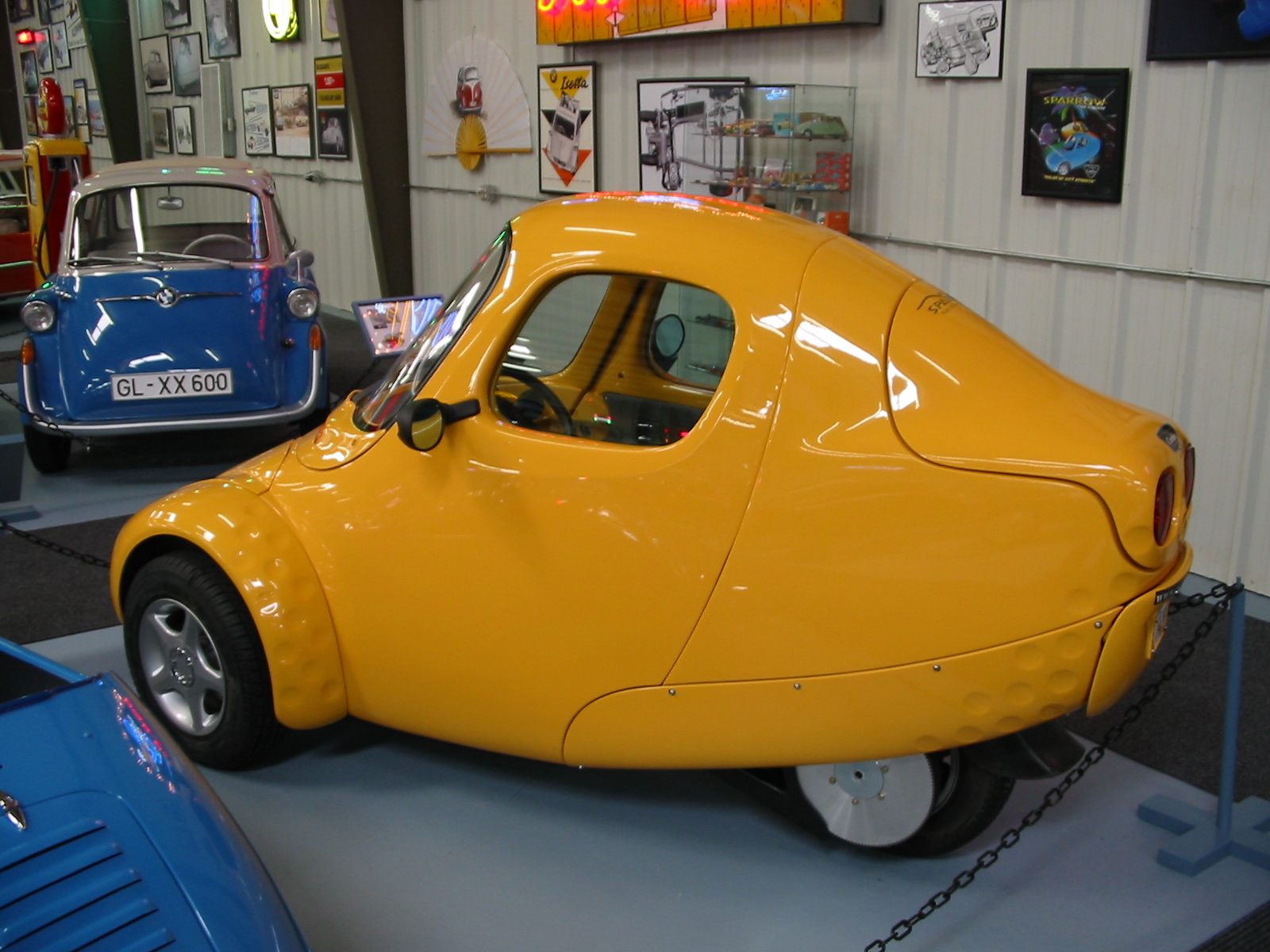
Corbin Sparrow 'Pizza Butt'.

The Myers Motors NmG (formerly the Corbin Sparrow) is a single-passenger, three-wheeled, battery electric vehicle designed specifically for commuting and city driving, produced from 1999 into the early 2010s. It was initially produced by Corbin Motors, and made to order after 2005 by Myers Motors. It is a personal electric vehicle (PEV).

== Description ==
The Sparrow is powered by a 20 kW (continuous) 156-volt DC or 3-phase AC electric motor and has a range of 32 to 64 km (20 to 40 mi) and a top speed of 112 km/h (70 mph). Fuel efficiency is approximately 130 W·h/km (4.8 mi/(kW·h), which is equivalent to 162 mpg (US) or 194 mpg (UK) (1.45 L/100 km) using the DOE conversion.

Two models were produced: the original "jelly bean" model and then a hatchback model, which was nicknamed "pizza butt" because it was designed for use by Domino's Pizza. Several Sparrows were featured in the feature films Austin Powers in Goldmember and Looper.

In June 2008, the website listed a price of $29,995 without taxes or shipping. In 2009, the NmG began to use lithium batteries which Myers Motors claims doubled its driving range to 97 km (60 mi) between charges.

In February 2013, the NmG disappeared from the Myer Motors "Buy your NmG" page on their website, replaced by the 2 seat Duo.

== Electrical system ==
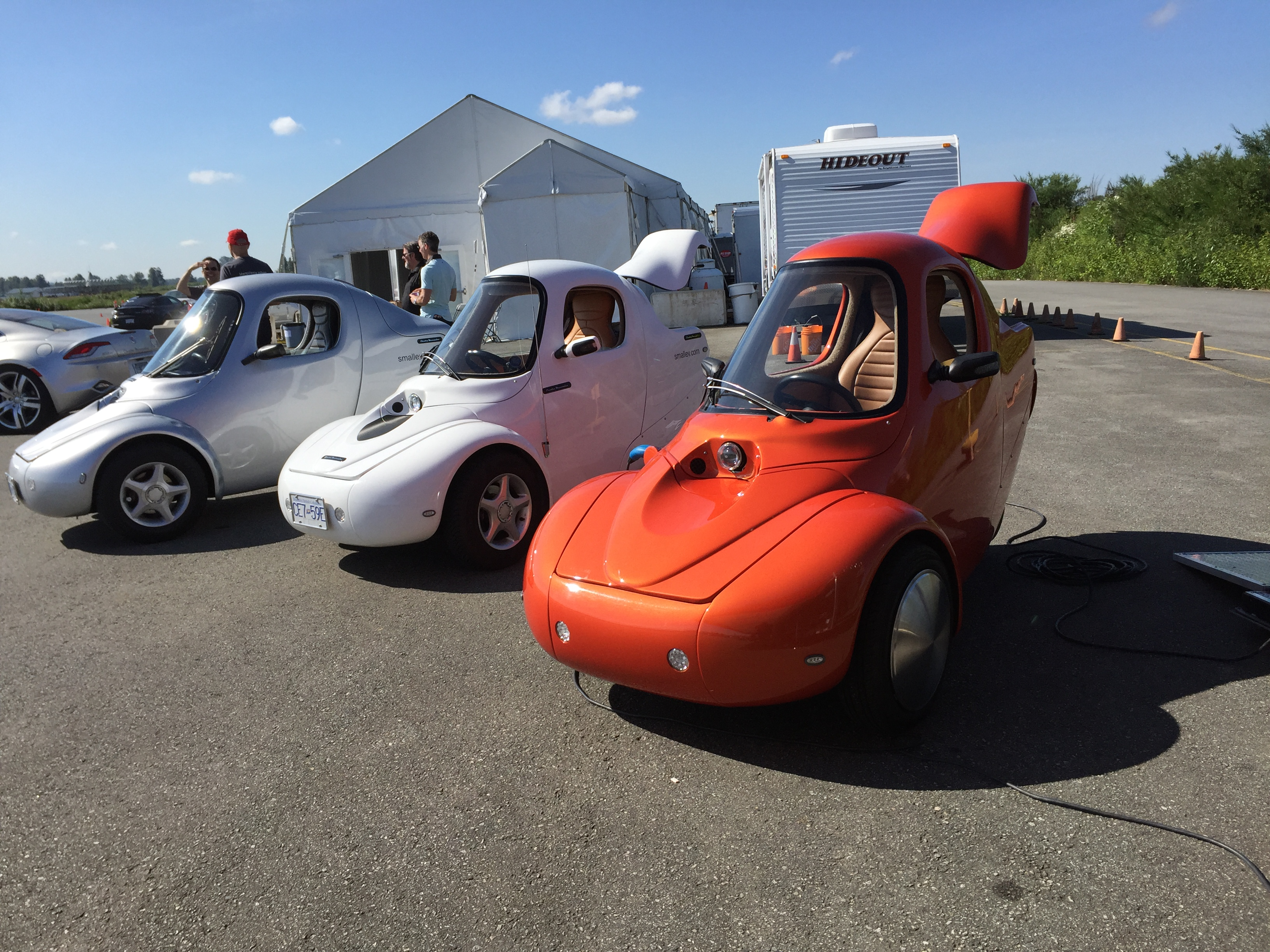
Three-wheeler Sparrow cars in 2016

The Sparrow electrical system in a Corbin Sparrow VIN28 is composed of three isolated sections. "Defanging" is the process of changing the circuit to disconnect the high voltage from the low voltage.

Line voltage
110 / 220 V AC

- Battery charger (on-board charger made by Zivan). It can be replaced by a Manzanitamicro PFC-20 or PFC-30
- Line voltage sensor

High voltage
156 V DC

- A 20 kW (continuous) 156-volt DC traction motor (Advanced DC Motors 8-inch (203 mm) diameter, part #203-06-4004)
- Motor controller (Zark VIN 28, DCP or KiloVac EVCL controllers)
- Energy is supplied by a battery pack composed of thirteen 12-volt deep-cycle lead-acid Optima batteries.

Low voltage
13.5 V DC

- DC to DC converter
- Accessories: this includes cigarette lighter outlet, radio/CD player, ignition switch, cabin fan and heater, speedometer, horn, turn signals, automotive lighting (headlamps, taillamps and backup lamps), door switch, seat belt, brake alarms, power windows and windshield wiper.

== See also ==
- Electric motorcycles and scooters
- Three-wheeler
- Electric vehicle

Other microcars and 3-wheel electric/hybrid automobiles

- List of microcars by country of origin
- HM Vehicles Free-way
- Messerschmitt KR200
- Aptera (solar electric vehicle)
- Commuter Cars Tango
- ja:Fuji Cabin
- Voiturette
- Cyclecar
