= His Master's Voice (disambiguation) =

His Master's Voice is an entertainment trademark.

== Businesses ==
- HMV, a music and entertainment retailer, referring to "His Master's Voice"
- Gramophone Company / EMI, the former British company that used the "His Master's Voice" trademark for consumer electronics
- Victor Talking Machine Company / RCA Corporation, the former American company that used the "His Master's Voice" trademark for consumer electronics
- JVCKenwood, the Japanese company that uses the "His Master's Voice" trademark for its consumer electronics and entertainment products

== Record labels ==
=== Europe ===
- His Master's Voice (British record label), the former British record label
- Deutsche Grammophon, the German record label that once traded as "His Master's Voice"
- Electrola, the German record label that once traded as "His Master's Voice"
- La voce del padrone, the former Italian record label, meaning "His Master's Voice"
- La Voix de son maître, the former French record label, meaning "His Master's Voice"

=== Asia ===
- Saregama, the Indian record label that once traded as "His Master's Voice"
- Victor Entertainment, the Japanese music and entertainment distributor that uses the "His Master's Voice" trademark for its releases

=== Oceania ===
- EMI Music Australia, the Australian record label that once traded as "His Master's Voice"
- Universal Music New Zealand, the New Zealand record label that once traded as "His Master's Voice"

== Other ==
- His Master's Voice (novel), a 1968 novel by Stanisław Lem
- His Master's Voice (Hannu Rajaniemi story), short story by Hannu Rajaniemi
- His Master's Voice (radio series), a satirical comedy series on BBC Radio 4
- His Master's Voice (1925 film), an American silent war drama film
- His Master's Voice (2018 film), a Hungarian science-fiction film
- "His Master's Voice", a song by Monsters of Folk from the 2009 album Monsters of Folk

== See also ==
- HMV (disambiguation)
