= Triking =

British sports car manufacturer

Triking Sports Cars

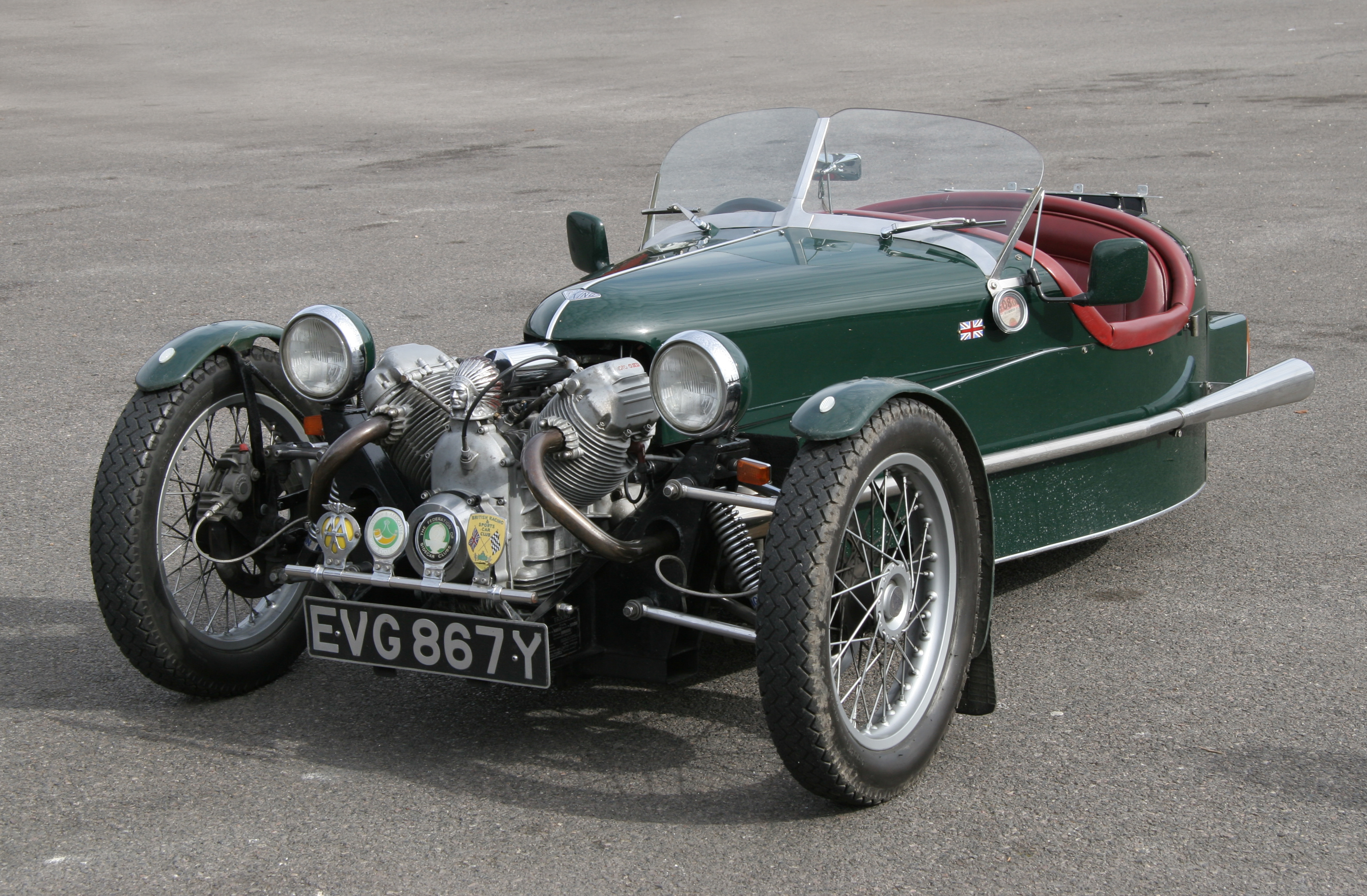
Triking Cyclecar

Triking is the common name for the Triking Sports Cars, the United Kingdom based manufacturer of the 3-wheeled Triking Cyclecar, located in Hingham, Norfolk, formerly in Marlingford, Norfolk. Trikings are essentially a modern version of the 1930s Morgan three-wheelers, and a cross between a sports car and a microcar.

== History ==
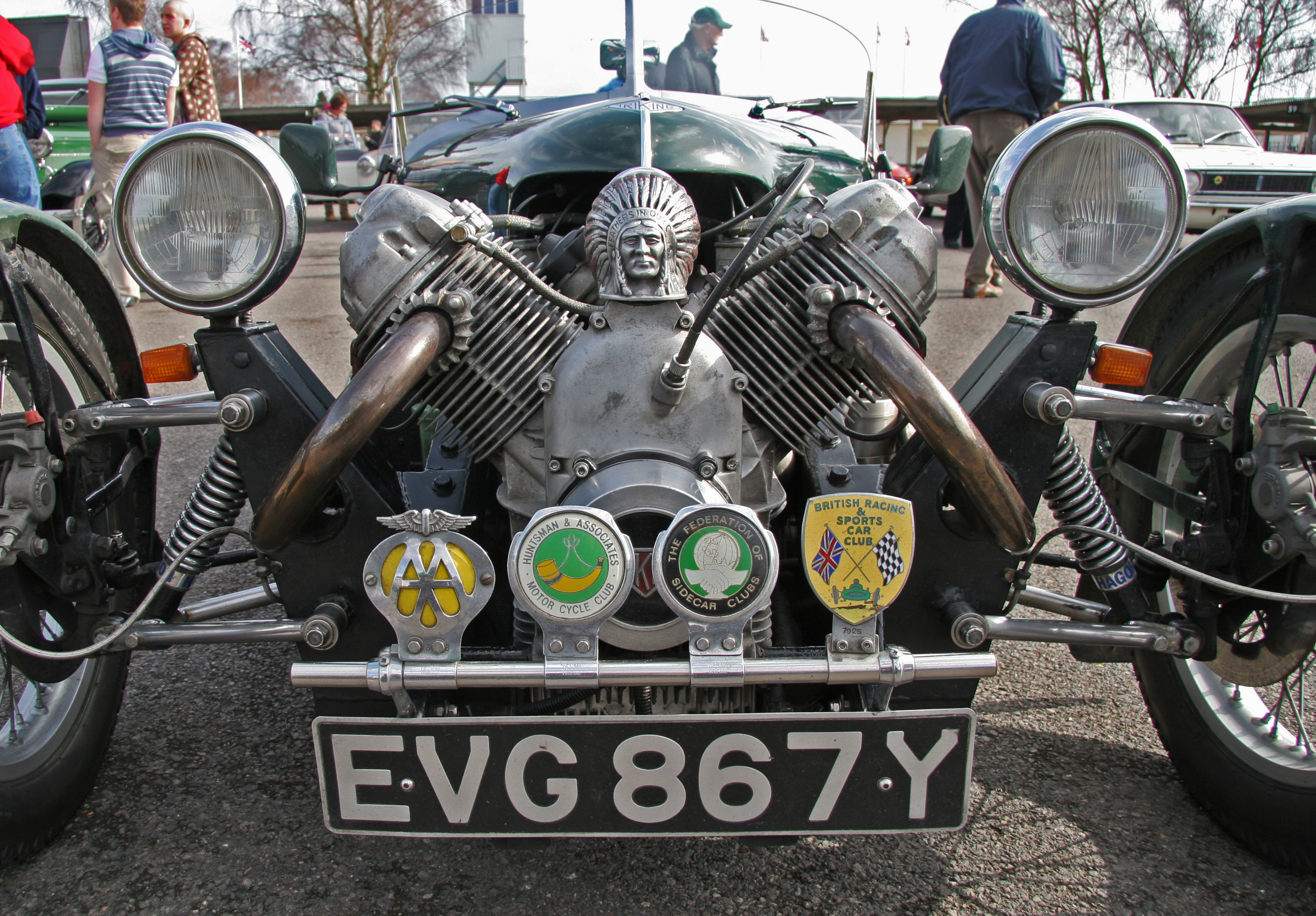
Triking with front mounted Moto-Guzzi V-twin motorcycle engine

Triking Sports Cars was founded as Triking Cyclecars Ltd by former Lotus employee Tony Divey (1930 - 2013). He built the first Triking in the late 1970s because he was unable to acquire a Morgan. It featured a steel space frame with alloy panels and a glass-fibre bonnet, and was powered by a Moto Guzzi V-twin motorcycle engine. Its popularity led to production. In 1990 Divey designed a new tubular front end and a one piece glass-fibre "body".

Telegraph writer, Andrew English, commented of the Triking driving experience: "The intimacy is both profound, delightful and, for the claustrophobic, disturbing. Everything is so contiguous with the driver; you could have sex at a greater distance than this."

Triking Cyclecars Ltd was dissolved in 2006 upon Divey's retirement and was reformed in 2009 by Alan Layzell, a Triking employee.

== See also ==
- List of car manufacturers of the United Kingdom
- Three-wheeler
- Cyclecar
- Motorcycle motor powered car
- List of motorized trikes
- Morgan 3-Wheeler
