= Flike =

Type of aircraft

Flike (a portmanteau of fly and bike) is a manned personal tricopter, similar in concept to a hoverbike. Flike was developed at the Hungarian research institute, Bay Zoltan Nonprofit Ltd. It achieved its first manned flight on March 7, 2015.
