= CityEl =

Mini-El
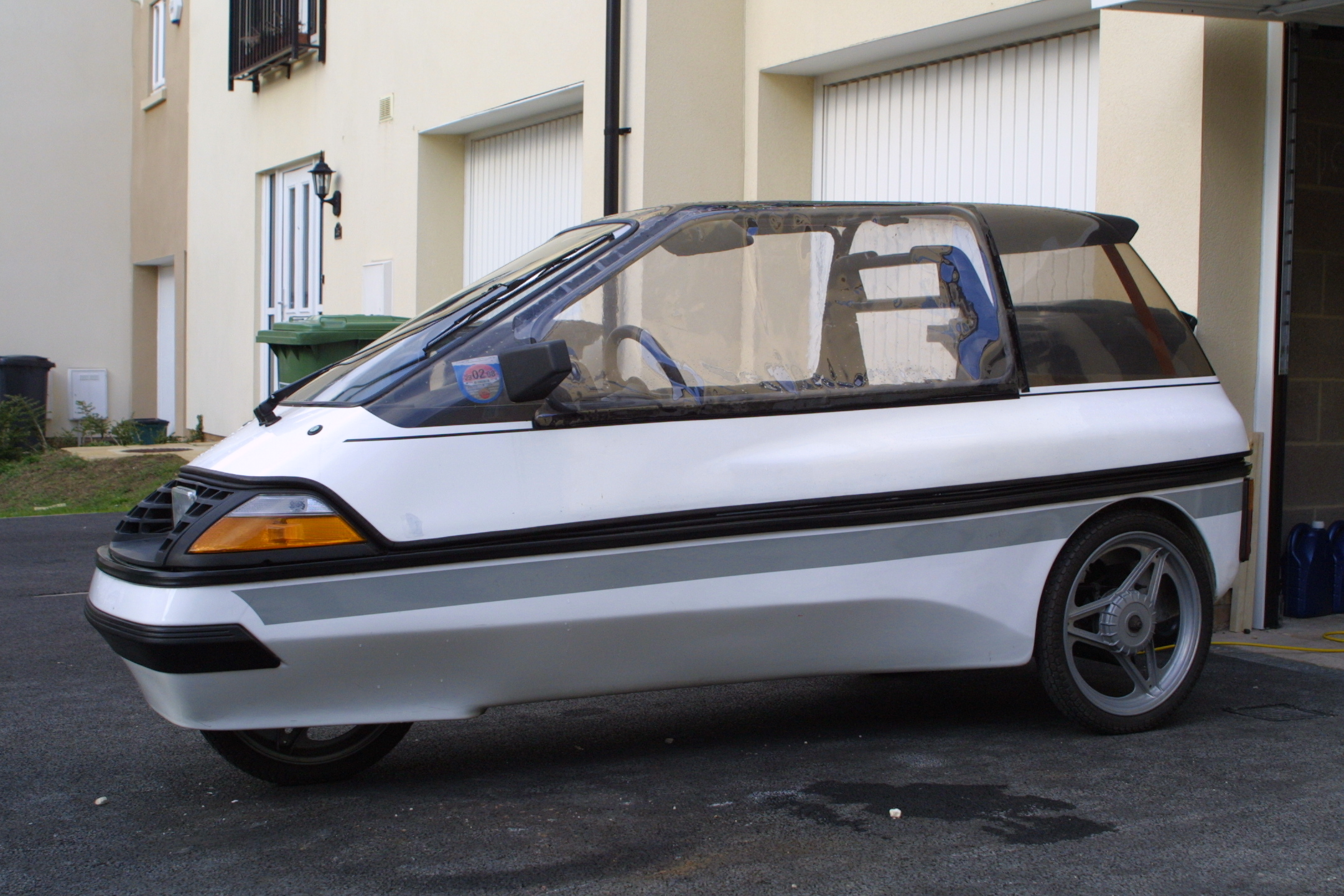
- 1992 Mini-El 'Basic' side view

Overview
- Type: Electric car
- Manufacturer: El Trans A/S (1987-1988); Eltrans1 A/S (1991-1995); Eltrans89 A/S (1995-199?); CityCom GmbH (2012-2018)
- Also called: Ellert
- Production: 1987-2018
- Assembly: Denmark, Germany
- Designer: Steen Volmer Jensen

Body and chassis
- Class: Microcar
- Body style: Lifting bodywork

Powertrain
- Electric motor: 4.5 kW electric motor
- Battery: 4.8 kWh lithium iron phosphate
- Range: 70–90 km (43–56 mi)

Dimensions
- Curb weight: 210–280 kg (463–617 lb)

The CityEl is a 3-wheel lightweight electric car originally designed and manufactured in Denmark, but currently made in Germany by Citycom GmbH.

== History ==
The CityEl was originally developed as the Mini-El by Danish company El Trans A/S in Randers and was first brought onto the market by them in 1987. After El Trans A/S had to give up production in 1988 and two subsequent manufacturers (Eltrans89 A/S in 1993 and CityCom A/S in 1995), one more try was done with Citycom Electromoblie Denmark A/S, before a German investor took over and moved the company to Aub. In 2009 the company was renamed Smiles AG, when it started to sell electric vehicles of other brands besides their own; but three years later Smiles experienced financial difficulties and production of the CityEl restarted with CityCom GmbH.

The vehicle is for one person, seated centrally. Rather than conventional doors, the whole top-half of the vehicle hinges upwards on gas-struts allowing access to the cockpit. An optional child seat allows the car to carry a child (up to 30 kg), sitting behind the front seat on the engine compartment, facing backwards. The driver operates car-like controls (steering wheel, brake and throttle pedals) although the vehicle is classed as an electric motorcycle in some countries.

There have been three body styles since production started. The 'Basic' version has a completely solid roof. Some versions have plexiglass side-windows. The Convertible was a fully open version no longer made by CityCom. In its place the 'Targa' version was constructed, with a removable centre soft top but solid rear windows. In America the City El was sold with a fibreglass roof. This roof is slightly different from the factory-built City El roof.

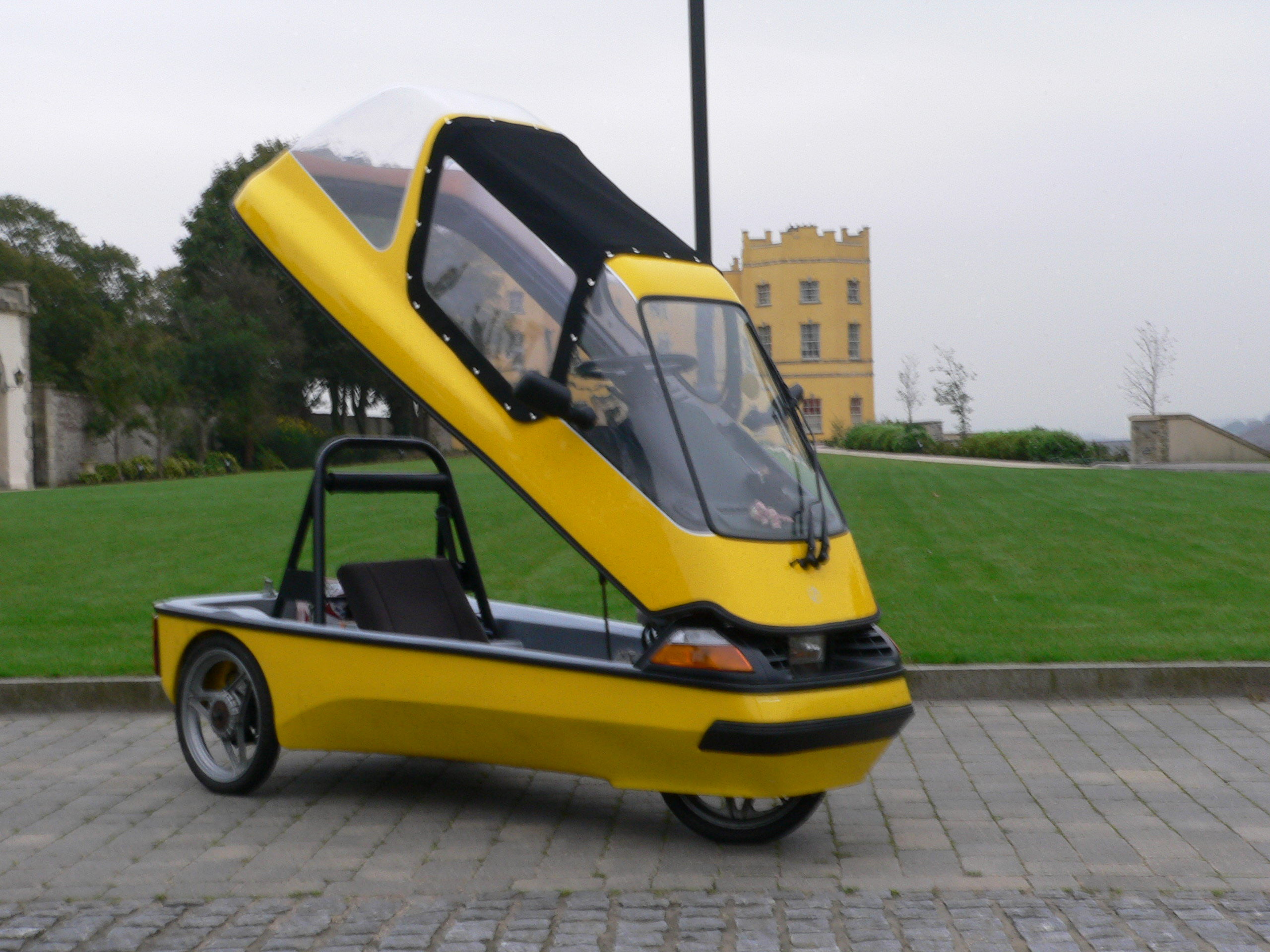
1997 City El 'Targa' (or 'fun')

== Technical specifications ==
The older version had a 36-volt, 0.8 kW motor and in 1990 a 2.5 kW motor with three 80 Ah lead acid batteries, a 40 km/h (25 mph) (Series1) to 55 km/h (34 mph) (Series2 and up) top speed and a range of 60 to 70 km (37 to 43 mi) (Series1) or 40 to 50 km (25 to 31 mi) (Series2). The consumption from Series2 and up was 7 to 9 kW·h/100 km. The new version FactFour has four lead acid batteries, a much better 4 kW electric motor that provides a 63 km/h (39 mph) top speed and 70 to 90 km (43 to 56 mi) range. The consumption is 3.5 to 5 kW·h/100 km. When the FactFour was introduced, Smilies started to offer a lithium-ion battery as an alternative, giving the vehicle a range of more than 120 km (75 mi). The City El is regularly modified by enthusiasts and it is common to see City Els powered by alternative batteries, such as the nickel-cadmium battery or a different lithium-ion battery. The improved performance and range given to the City El by using such batteries make them a viable town commuting vehicle with enough acceleration to keep up with city traffic.

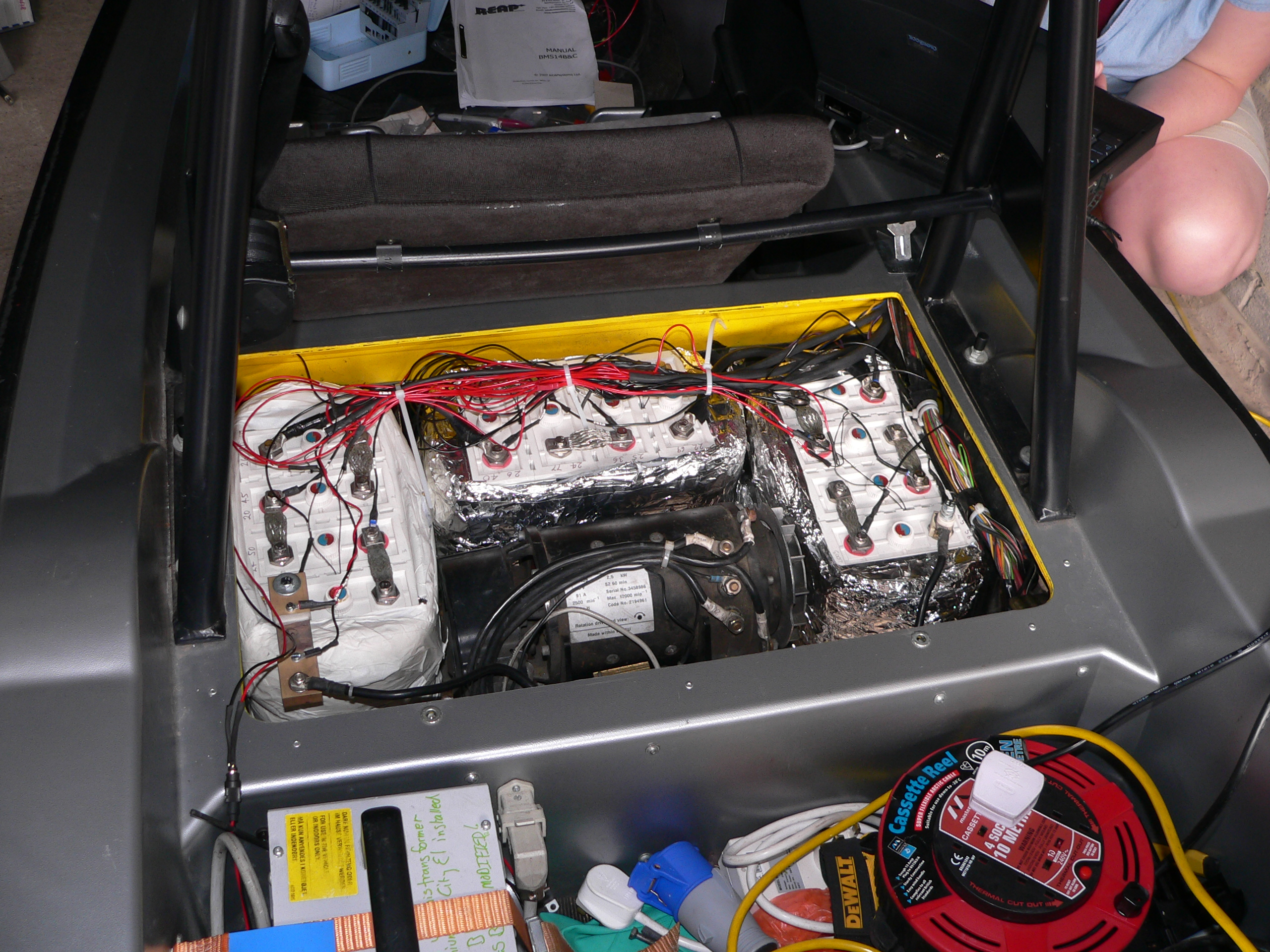
43V 100Ah lithium-ion upgraded City El

A City El weighs 280 kg (620 lb), and the front end can be lifted quite easily. When the batteries are removed it is possible for three people to lift a City El off the ground. When a City El is retrofitted with 100 Ah Thunder-sky lithium-ion batteries, the car becomes approximately 70 kg (150 lb) lighter, bringing the weight of the City El well under that of some motorbikes. At this point the driver has to take extreme care driving at 50 km/h (31 mph) or more in moderate crosswinds to prevent the City El from being blown about.

As of March 2017, the City El features a 4.5 kW motor powered by a 48 V lithium iron phosphate battery capable of storing from 60 to 100 Ah, i.e., up to 4.8 kWh.

== See also ==
- Cyclecar
- List of motorized trikes
