= JZR Trikes =

Three wheeled kit car manufacturer

JZR Trikes is a UK producer of traditionally-styled, motorcycle-engined trikes in kit form.

== History ==
From their workshop in Darwen, Lancashire, John Ziemba Restorations began to market the JZR in 1990. Some 320 JZR's were produced up until 1998 when there was a production hiatus until 2000. It continues in production today.

== The car ==
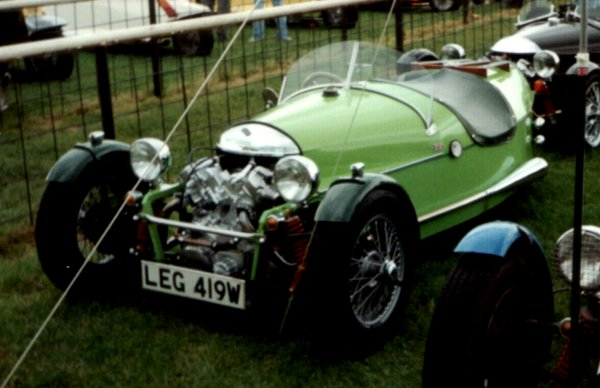
The JZR 'beetle-back' at Newark Kit Car Show, Lincolnshire c.1993

JZR was inspired by the early Morgan Aero three-wheelers and more recent cars like the Triking. The kit comprised a square tube steel chassis with a galvanized floorpan and body sides. The upper body consisted of GRP panels. There were two rear body styles: the “barrel back” which allowed a spare tyre to be mounted at the rear; and the curved “beetle back”.

Power could come from a variety of engines. Initially the Honda CX 500 V-twin was used. Later Honda's CX 650, CX 500/650 turbo and Pan-European ST1100 V4 and Moto Guzzi's 850 and 1000 V-twins were added. Even the Harley-Davidson motor has been fitted to some examples, using a Ford Cortina gearbox and clutch. The power was transferred to the rear via shaft drive.

The front suspension used the spindles and disc brake assemblies of the Ford Cortina Mk IV/V, with bespoke wishbones and coil over dampers. The Ford Escort Mk II supplied the rack and pinion steering rack. At the rear, the donor Moto Guzzi or Honda motorcycle suspension was used with its twin coil over dampers, brakes, and transfer case.

== See also ==
- List of car manufacturers of the United Kingdom
