= HM Vehicles Free-way =

Defunct American motor vehicle manufacturer

H-M-Vehicles Free-Way
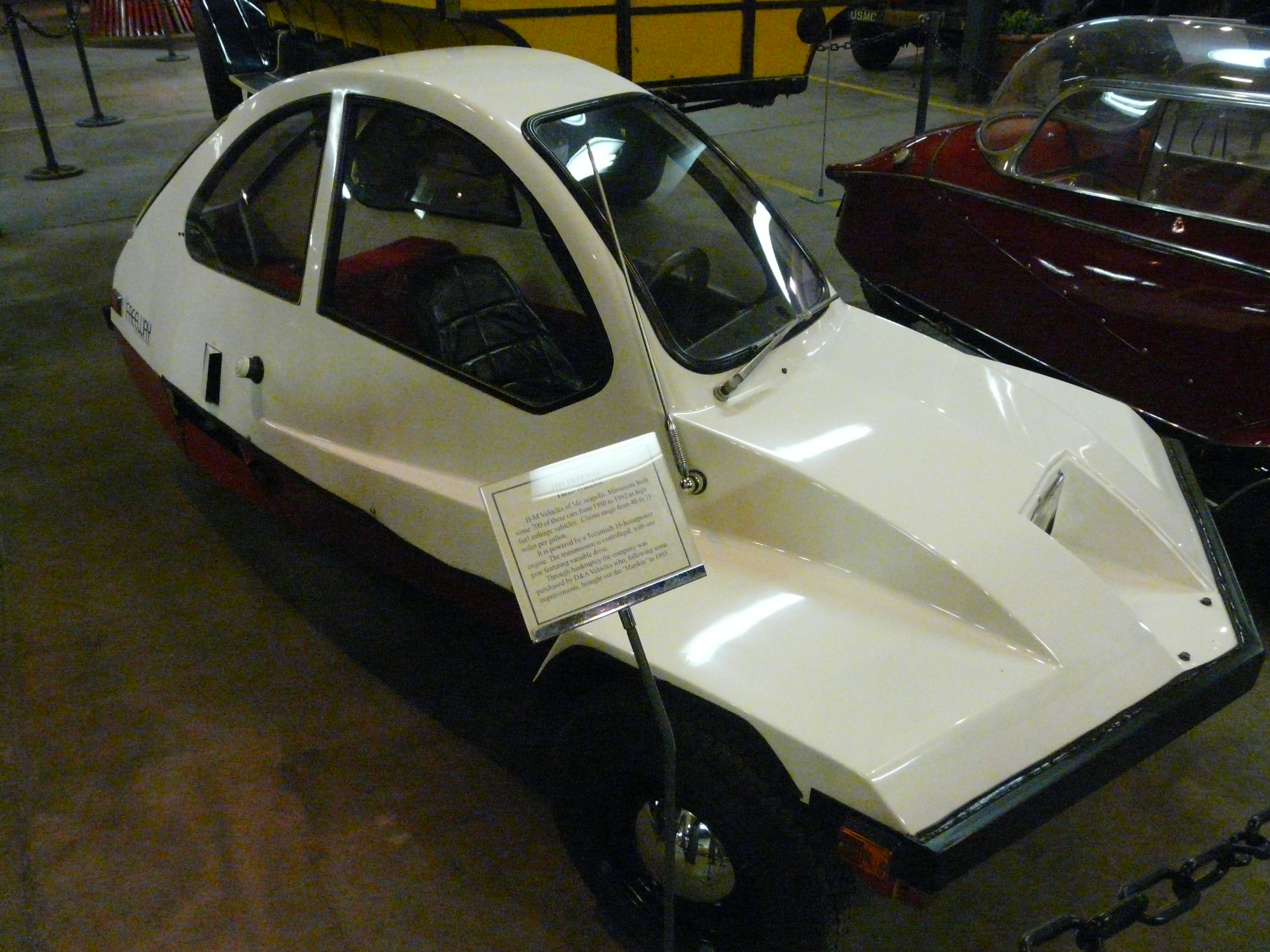

Overview
- Manufacturer: H-M-Vehicles Inc.
- Production: 1979–1982
- Assembly: Burnsville, Minnesota
- Designer: Dave Edmonson

Body and chassis
- Class: Microcar
- Body style: Coupe
- Layout: RMR layout
- Related: D&A Minikin

Powertrain
- Engine: Tecumseh single-cylinder engine *12 hp model: 345 cc (21.1 cu in); *16 hp model: 453 cc (27.6 cu in) permanent magnet DC motor, 4 hp
- Transmission: CVT, no reverse gear

Dimensions
- Length: 115 in (292 cm)
- Width: 53 in (135 cm)
- Height: 51 in (130 cm)
- Curb weight: gasoline: 700 lb (318 kg) electric: 900 lb (408 kg)

The H-M-Vehicles Free-Way (H-M meaning high mileage) was a three-wheel microcar manufactured in Burnsville, Minnesota, from 1979 to 1982.

HMV Freeway vehicles, 2010

These small commuter cars had a single seat and were powered by a 12 or 16 hp (9 or 12 kW) gasoline engine or a 4 hp electric motor. A diesel engine was offered, but none were ordered with it.

The 12 HP version was guaranteed to get 100 mpg_{‑US} (2.4 L/100 km; 120 mpg_{‑imp}) when driven at a steady 40 mph (64 km/h). The 12 HP version averaged 80 mpg_{‑US} (2.9 L/100 km; 96 mpg_{‑imp}), and the larger 16 hp averaged 60 mpg_{‑US} (3.9 L/100 km; 72 mpg_{‑imp}) to 70 mpg_{‑US} (3.4 L/100 km; 84 mpg_{‑imp}). The standard fuel tank had a capacity of 3 US gallons (11 L) while a 10 US gallons (38 L) tank was optional.

The engine was mounted behind the driver and was coupled to a snowmobile-style CVT belt drive transmission. Final drive to the rear wheel was by chain. The gasoline-powered Free-Way did not have a reverse gear in its transmission. An electrically powered reverse drive was offered as an option, but was never made available.

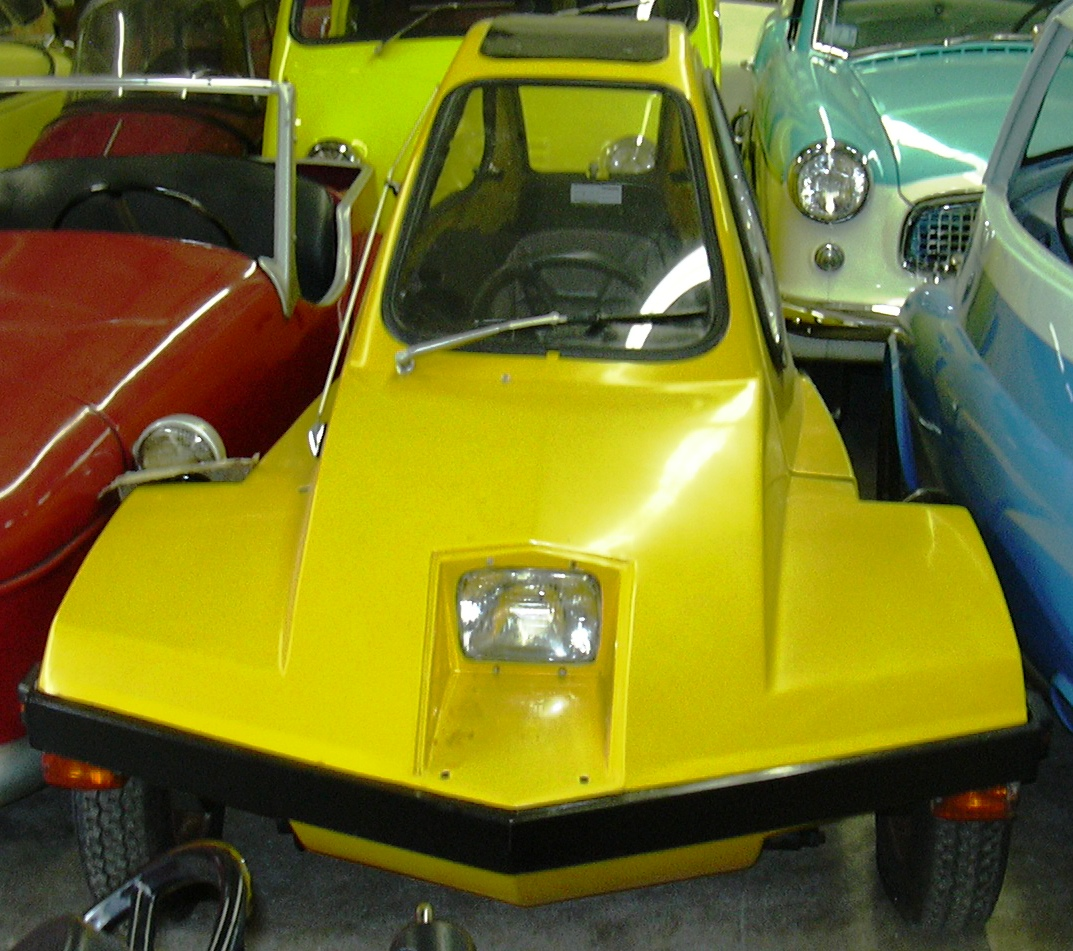
Front view

The Free-Way had a welded tubular steel frame, with a secondary perimeter frame at bumper height to protect the driver from impacts. Suspension was fully independent, with two wheels in front and a single wheel in the rear. The fully enclosed two-piece fiberglass body was approximately 0.125 inches (3.2 mm) thick and had the color molded into the material and was available in high-visibility red, yellow, or orange. The lower body included a full undertray to reduce the drag coefficient of the vehicle.

The Free-Way had a single headlight and per federal standards were intended to be licensed as a motorcycle, but in some states they were titled as cars.

About 700 Free-Ways were sold before the company closed in June 1982.

== See also ==
- List of microcars
- Three-wheeler
