= Gasi Motorradwagen Gesellschaft mbH =

Gasi Motorradwagen Gesellschaft mbH was a German automobile manufacturer. One source uses the name Gasi-Motorwagen GmbH.

== Description ==
The company was based in Berlin-Dahlem. Founders were Fritz Gary and Edmund Sieloff.

The motorcycle car was a three-wheeled vehicle with a single front wheel and a differential-free rear axle. It was only built in 1921. The tandem two-seater was powered by an air-cooled V2 engine, the power of which was passed on to the rear wheels by means of a chain. Another source said it was powered by a 498cc single cylinder four-stroke engine.

== Literature ==
Werner Oswald : Deutsche Autos 1920-1945, 10th edition, Motorbuch Verlag Stuttgart (1996), ISBN 3-87943-519-7, page 444
