= Egg (car) =

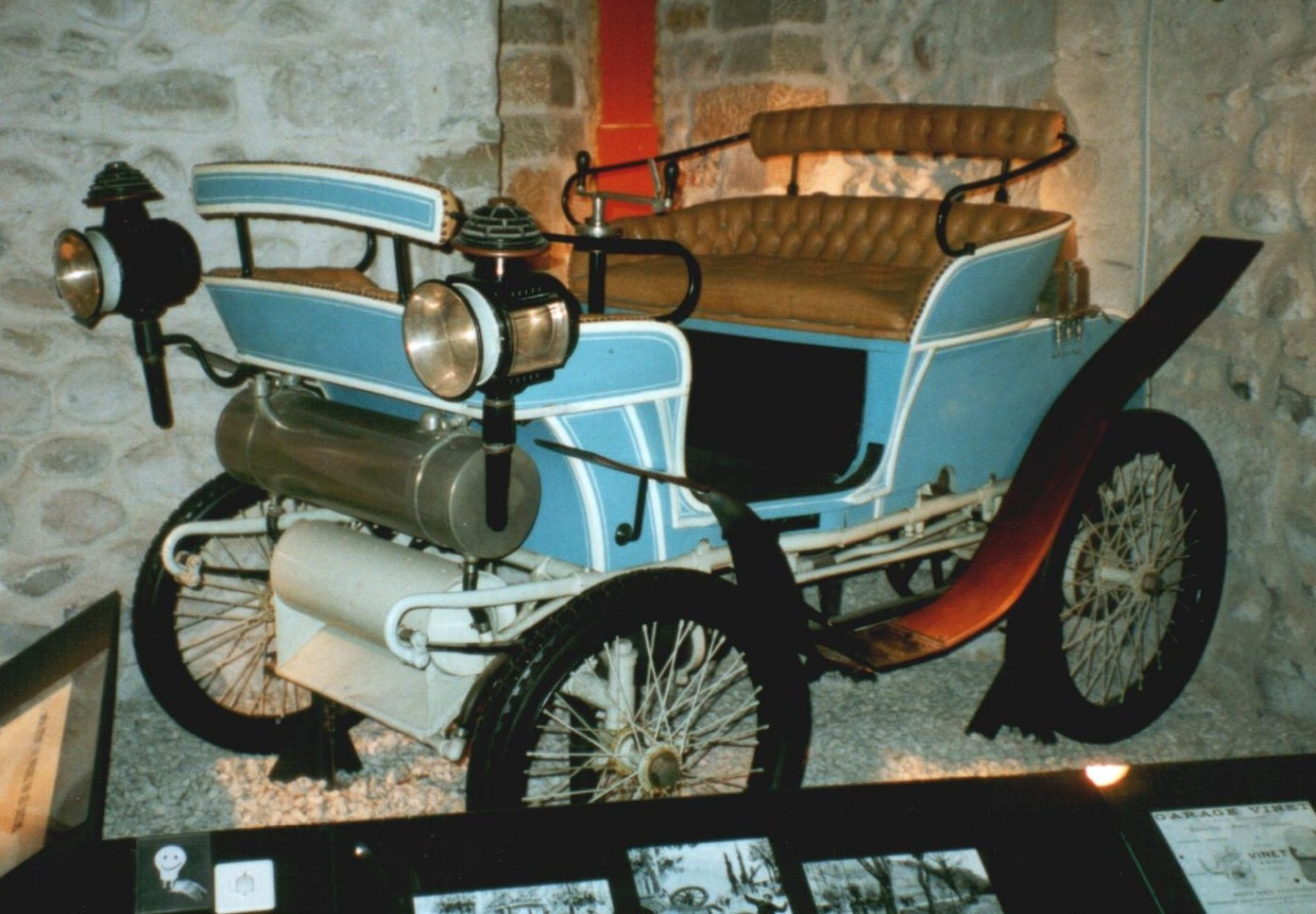
Egg & Egli built in 1899

Egg or Egg & Egli was a Swiss car made in business from 1896 to 1919. It was one of the more long-lived early Swiss car makes. It appeared at numerous auto shows and competed in France's annual smash-up derby.

== History ==
Rudolf Egg, an automotive engineer, built a car for his own use in 1893. He later founded the namesake company in 1896 in Zürich with funds from a Swiss banker called Egli. In 1904, the company moved to Wollishofen, operating under the name Motorwagenfabrik Excelsior. Egg's company later produced some of the first Swiss aircraft engines. Financial difficulties after the war forced the closure of the business in 1919. Egg himself later became a Renault dealer.

== Models ==
At the outset, all models were three-wheelers. Called Egg & Egli Tricycle before 1900, later three-wheelers were marketed as Egg & Egli Rapid. The first four-wheeled cars were produced in 1899, with a heavy resemblance to the Oldsmobile Curved Dash. Egg models were regarded as high-quality in Switzerland, and many Swiss companies produced them under license.
