= Fiberfab Scarab STM =

- Fiberfab Scarab STM on road — rear ¾ view.

Overview
- Manufacturer: Fiberfab

Body and chassis
- Layout: Reverse trike

The Scarab STM is a 3-wheeled car designed and manufactured in the United States of America beginning in 1976.

== History ==
The Scarab STM was manufactured by Fiberfab, a company founded by Warren "Bud" Goodwin. The "STM" in the name stands for "Sport Transport Module". The vehicle is a reverse trike design utilizing VW Beetle front suspension married to a rear motorcycle running gear. The Scarab STM is among the rarest of Fiberfab's models, with reports that only six were ever produced.

A road test of a prototype powered by a 900 cc Kawasaki engine reported that the test car covered the standing quarter mile in 14 seconds, reached 80 mph (129 km/h) in third gear, and handled banked turns at 40 mph (64 km/h) with ease.

Although photos of a prototype Scarab STM showed gull-wing doors, the production models did not use them. Instead, access to the interior was gained by lifting the vehicle's roof canopy up and forward.
