= Advance (English automobile) =

English tricar offered from 1902 to 1912

The Advance was an English tricar producing 6 hp (4.5 kW) offered from 1902 to 1912 by a Northampton motorcycle manufacturer.
