= Three-wheeler =

Vehicle with three wheels

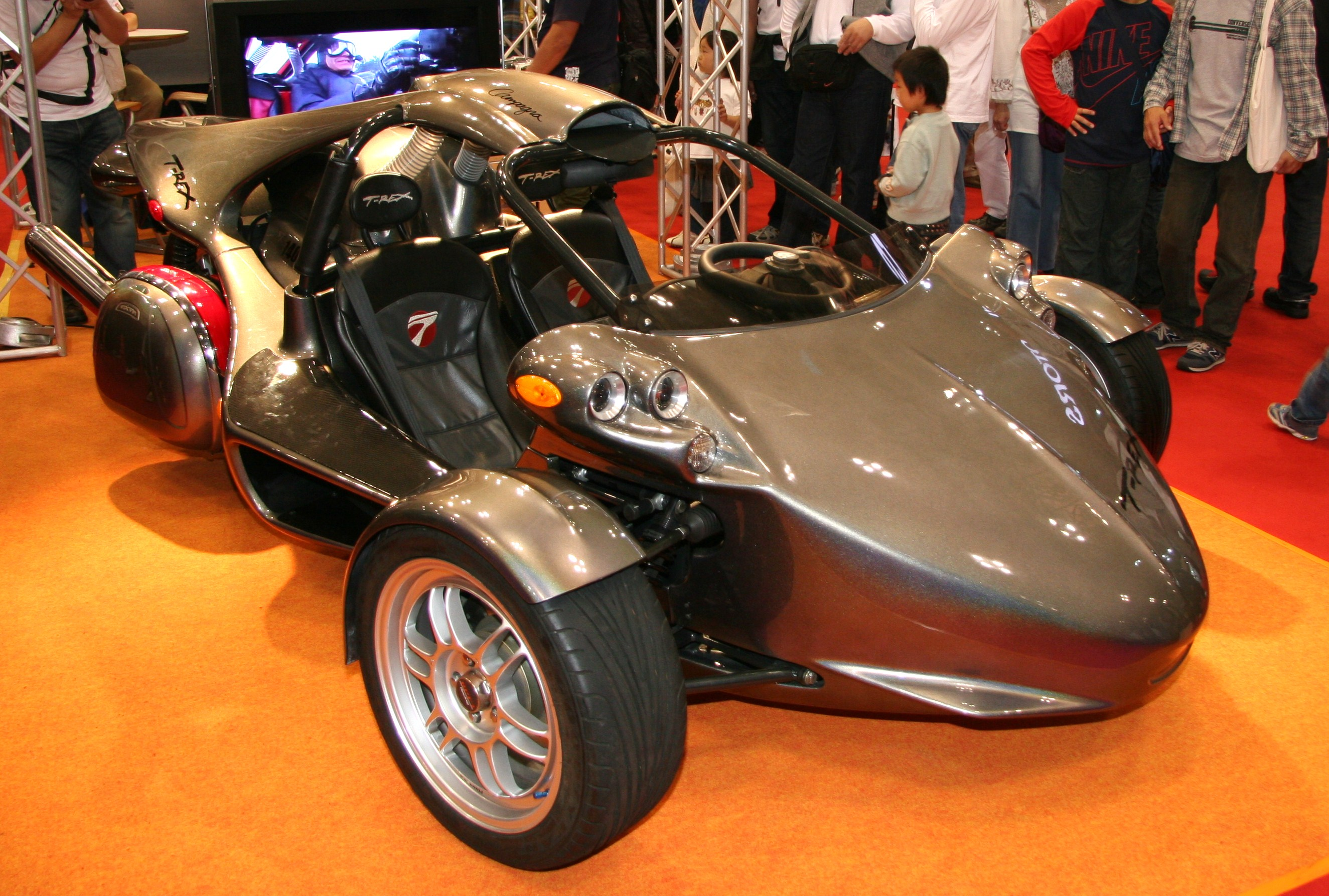
Campagna T-Rex

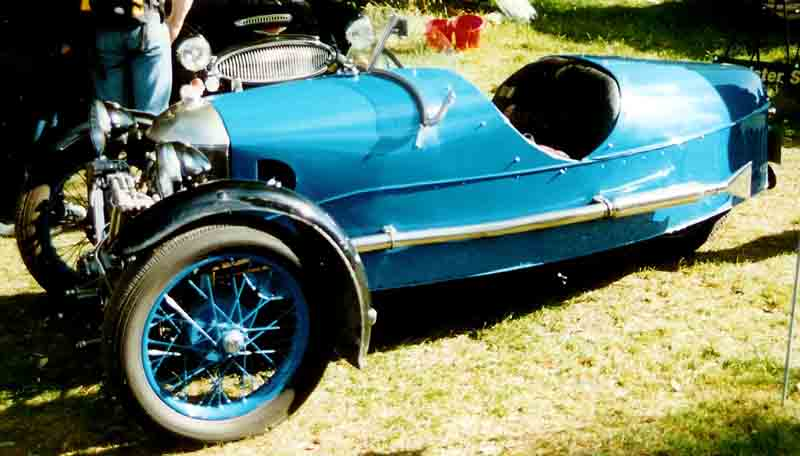
1932 Morgan Aero 2-Seater Sports

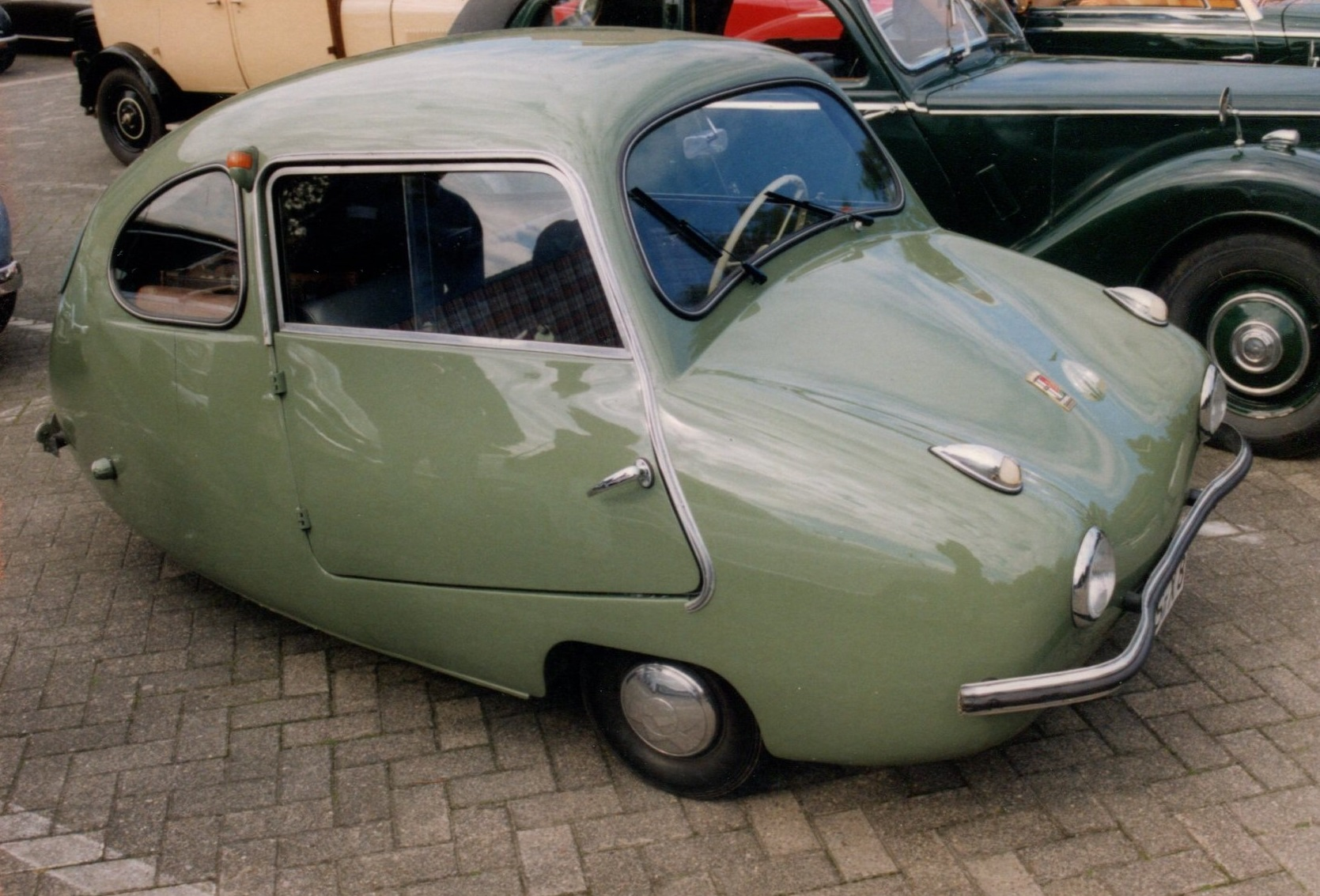
Fuldamobil three-wheeler (Postwar-era Germany)

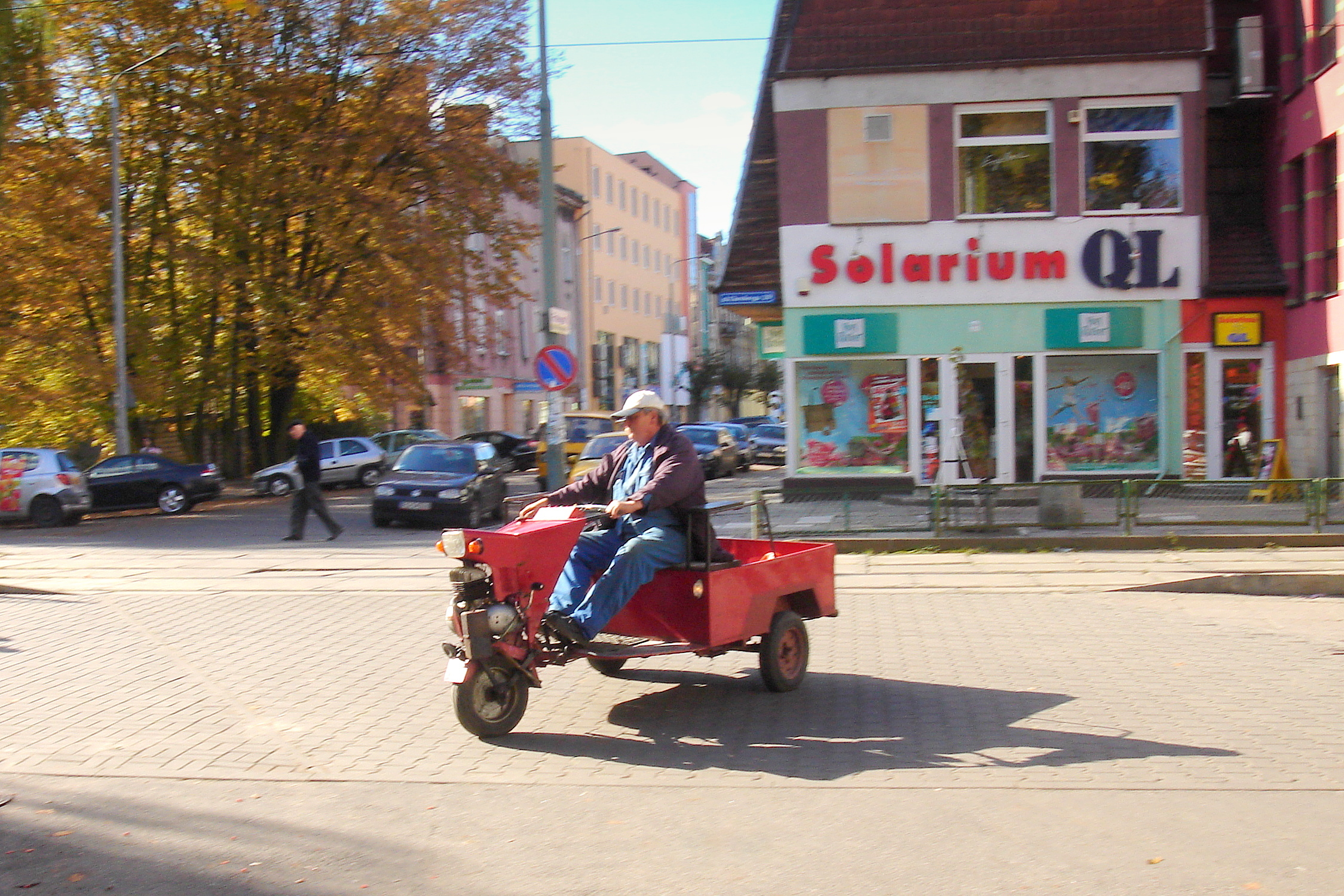
Tricycle truck in Poland (Gorzów Wlkp)

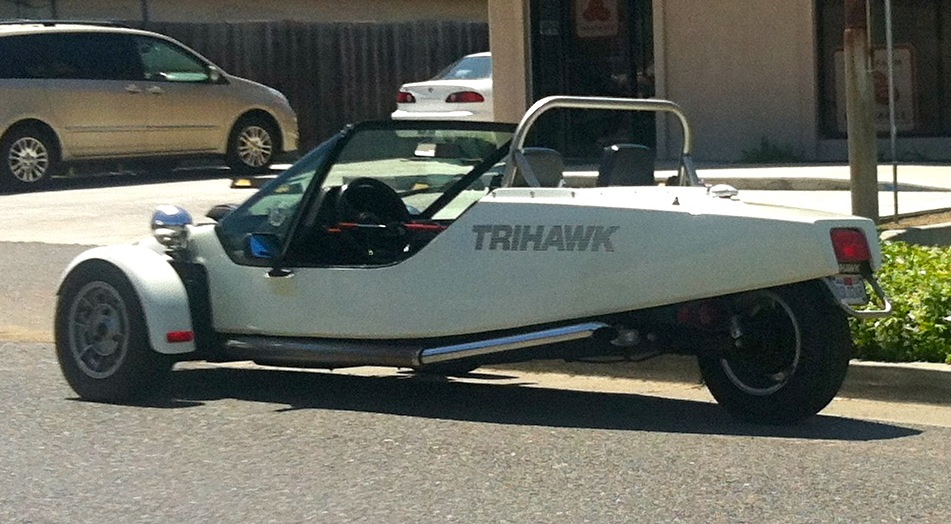
Trihawk, a tadpole-type trike manufactured in California, United States during the 1980s

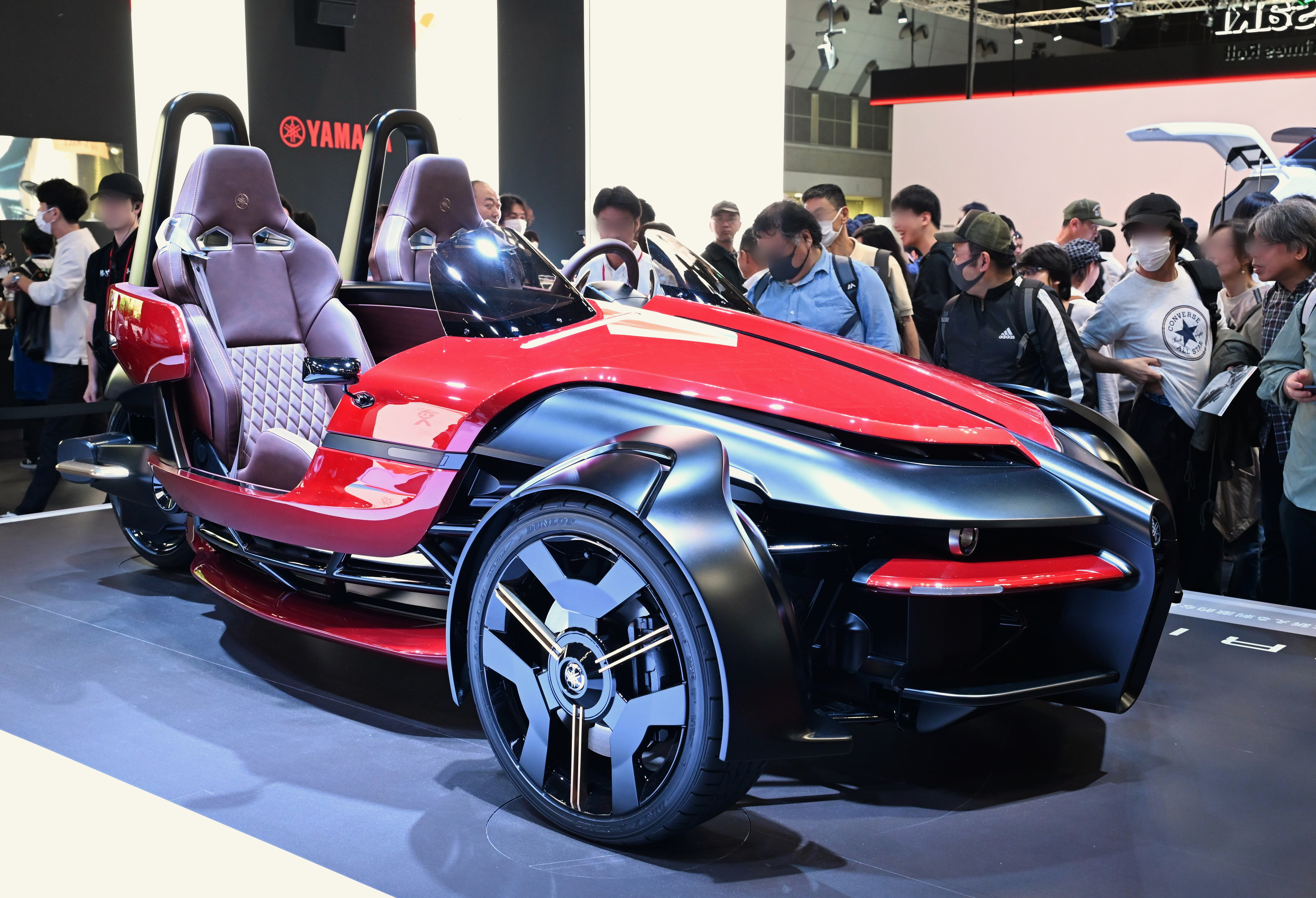
Yamaha Tricera Proto, all three wheels can be steered. (2025)

A three-wheeler, tricar, or trike is a vehicle with three wheels. Some are motorized tricycles, which may be legally classed as motorcycles, while others are tricycles without a motor, some of which are human-powered vehicles and animal-powered vehicles.

== Overview ==
Many three-wheelers, in the form of motorcycle-based machines, are called trikes and have a single front wheel, motorcycle-like mechanics, and a rear axle similar to that of a car. Often, such vehicles are owner-built using a portion of a rear-engine, rear-drive Volkswagen Beetle combined with a motorcycle front end. Other trikes include All-terrain vehicles specifically designed for off-road use.

Three-wheelers can have either one wheel at the back and two at the front (2F1R), (for example: Morgan Motor Company) or one wheel at the front and two at the back (1F2R) (such as the Reliant Robin). Due to better safety when braking, an increasingly popular form is the front-steering "tadpole" or "reverse trike" sometimes with front drive but usually with rear drive. A variant on the 'one at the front' layout was the Scott Sociable, which resembled a four-wheeler with a front wheel missing.

Three-wheelers, including some cyclecars, bubble cars and microcars, are built for economic and legal reasons: in the UK for tax advantages, or in the US to take advantage of lower safety regulations, being classed as motorcycles. As a result of their light construction and potential better streamlining, three-wheeled cars are usually less expensive to operate.

Some inexpensive three-wheelers have been designed specifically to improve mobility for disabled people.

Three-wheeler transport vehicles known as auto rickshaws are a common means of public transportation in many countries in the world, and are an essential form of urban transport in many developing countries such as India and the Philippines.

== History ==
Early automotive pioneer Karl Benz developed a number of three-wheeled models. One of these, the Benz Patent Motorwagen, is regarded as the first purpose-built automobile. It was made in 1885.

In 1896, John Henry Knight showed a tri-car at The Great Exhibition.

In 1897, Edward Butler made the Butler Petrol Cycle, another three-wheeled car.

A Conti 6 hp Tri-car competed in (but did not complete) a 1907 Peking to Paris race sponsored by a French newspaper, Le Matin.

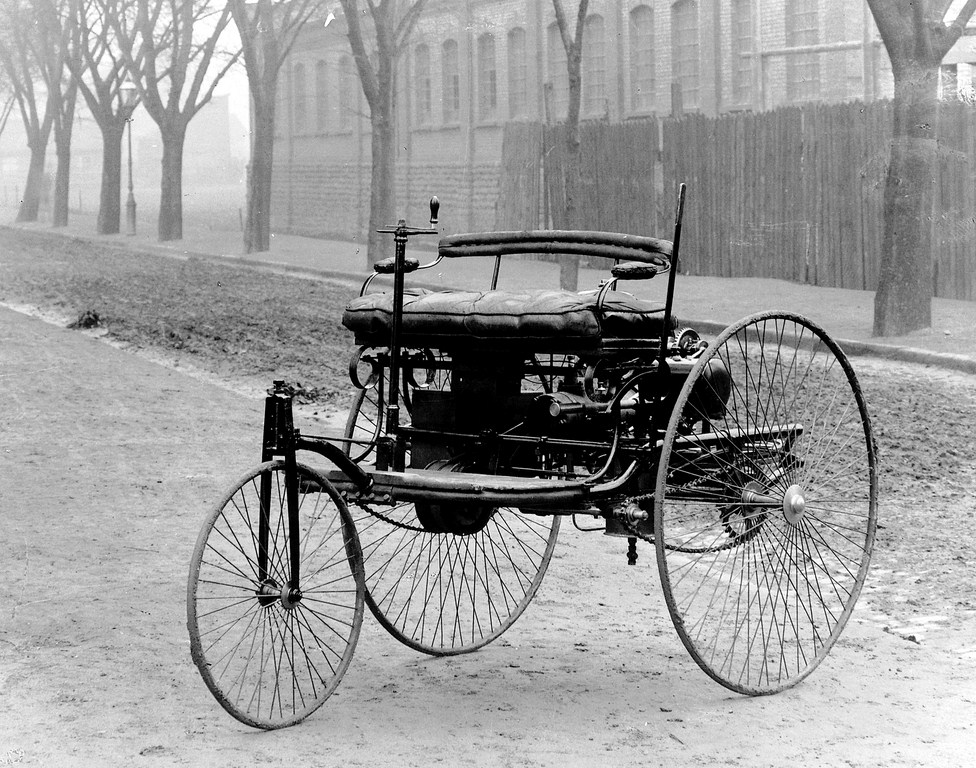
1885 Benz Patent Motorwagen

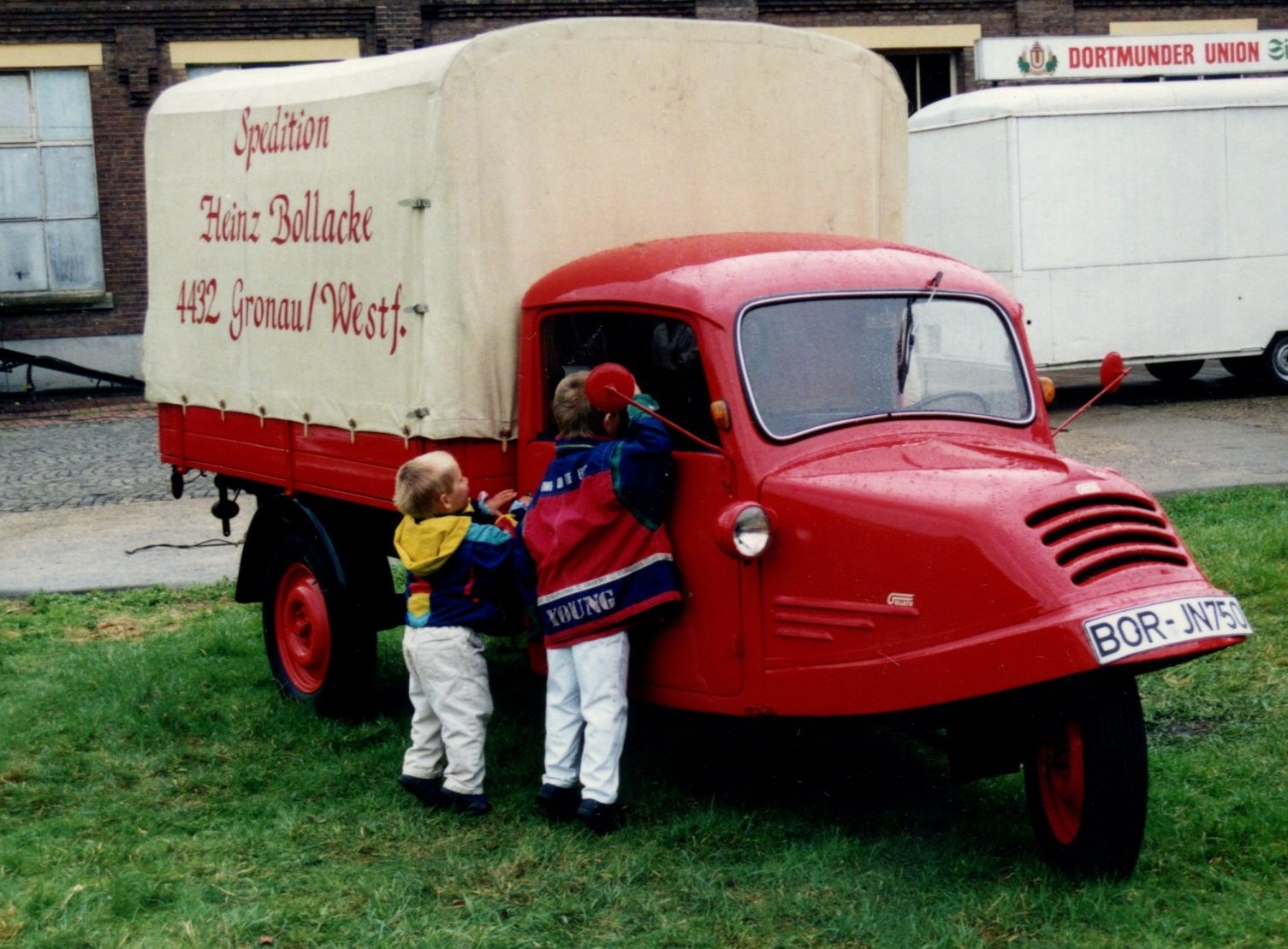
Goliath pickup truck at a meeting for vintage cars in the 1990s

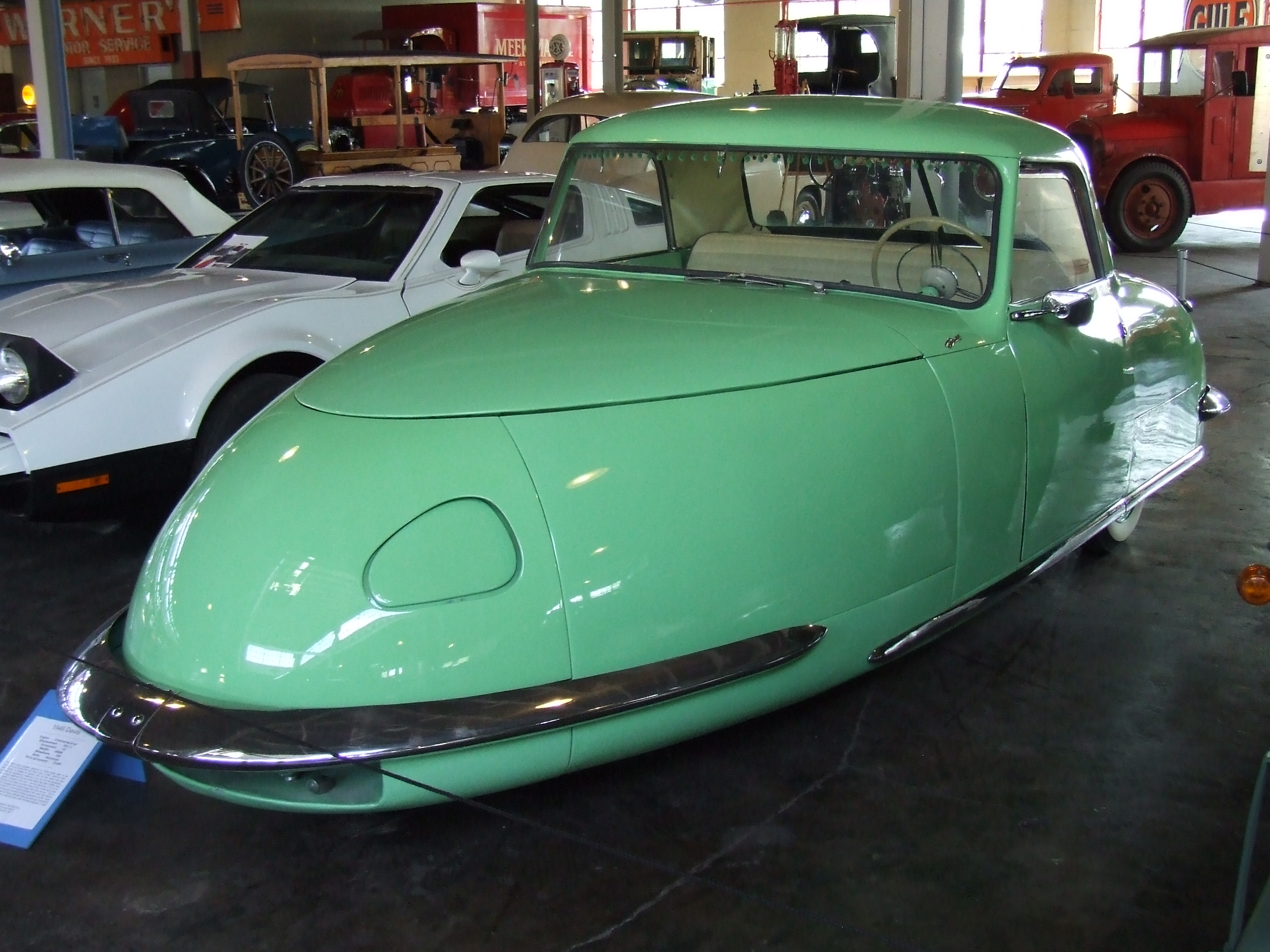
Davis D-2 Divan, at the National Automotive and Truck Museum, Auburn, Indiana, United States

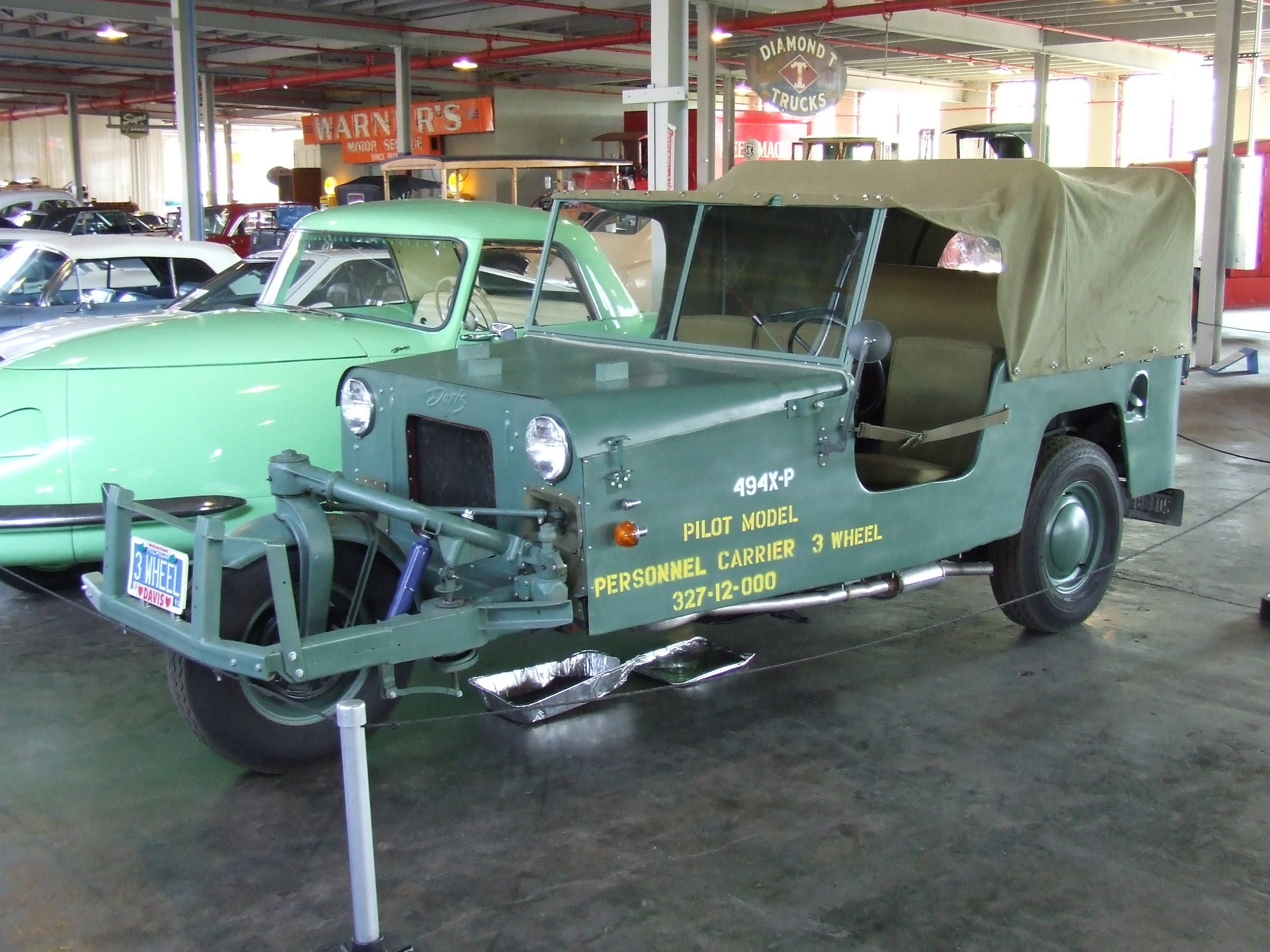
Davis 494, at the National Automotive and Truck Museum, Auburn, Indiana, USA

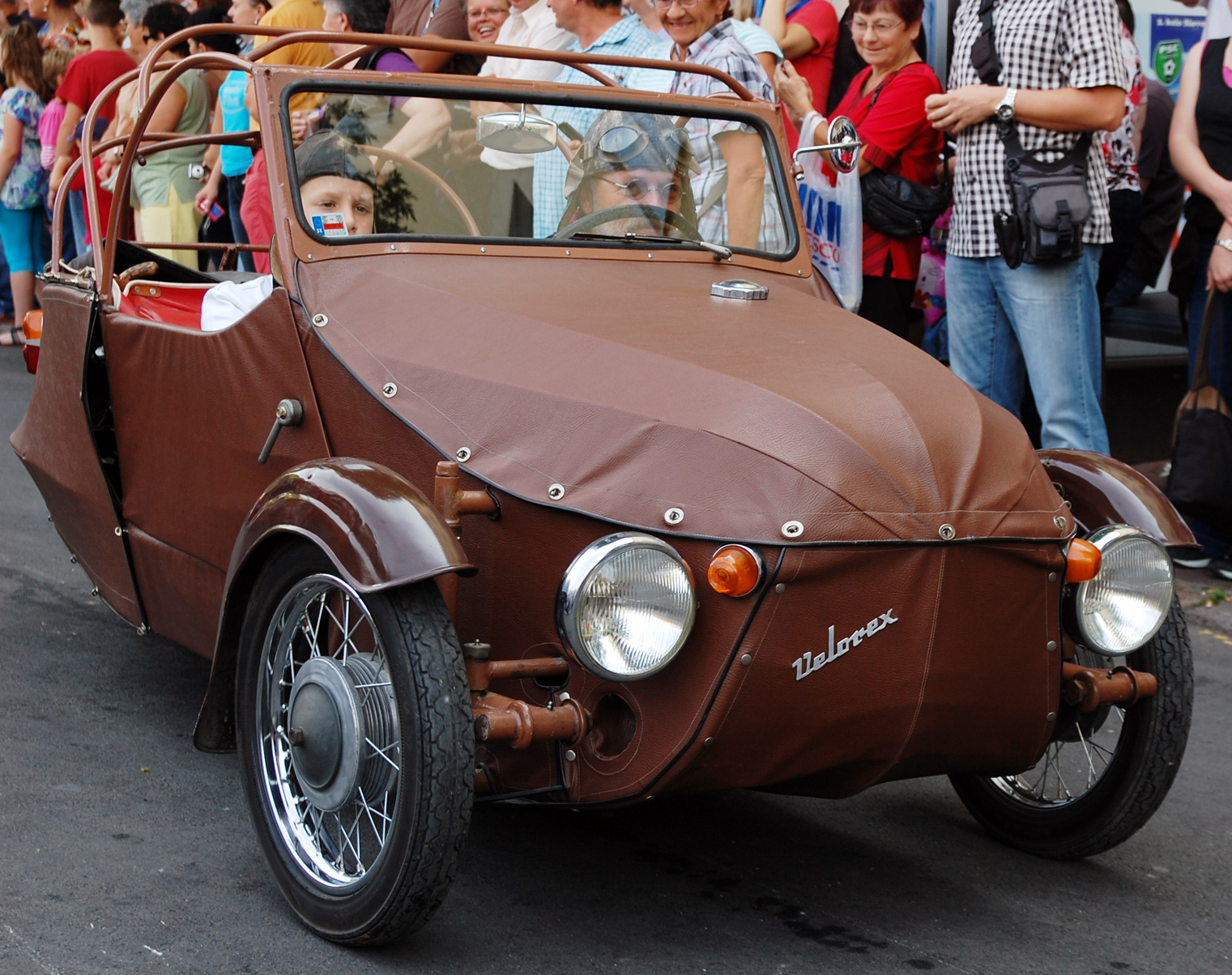
Velorex was a manufacturing cooperative in Solnice, Czechoslovakia, formed in 1936 to satisfy demand for small, inexpensive city cars.

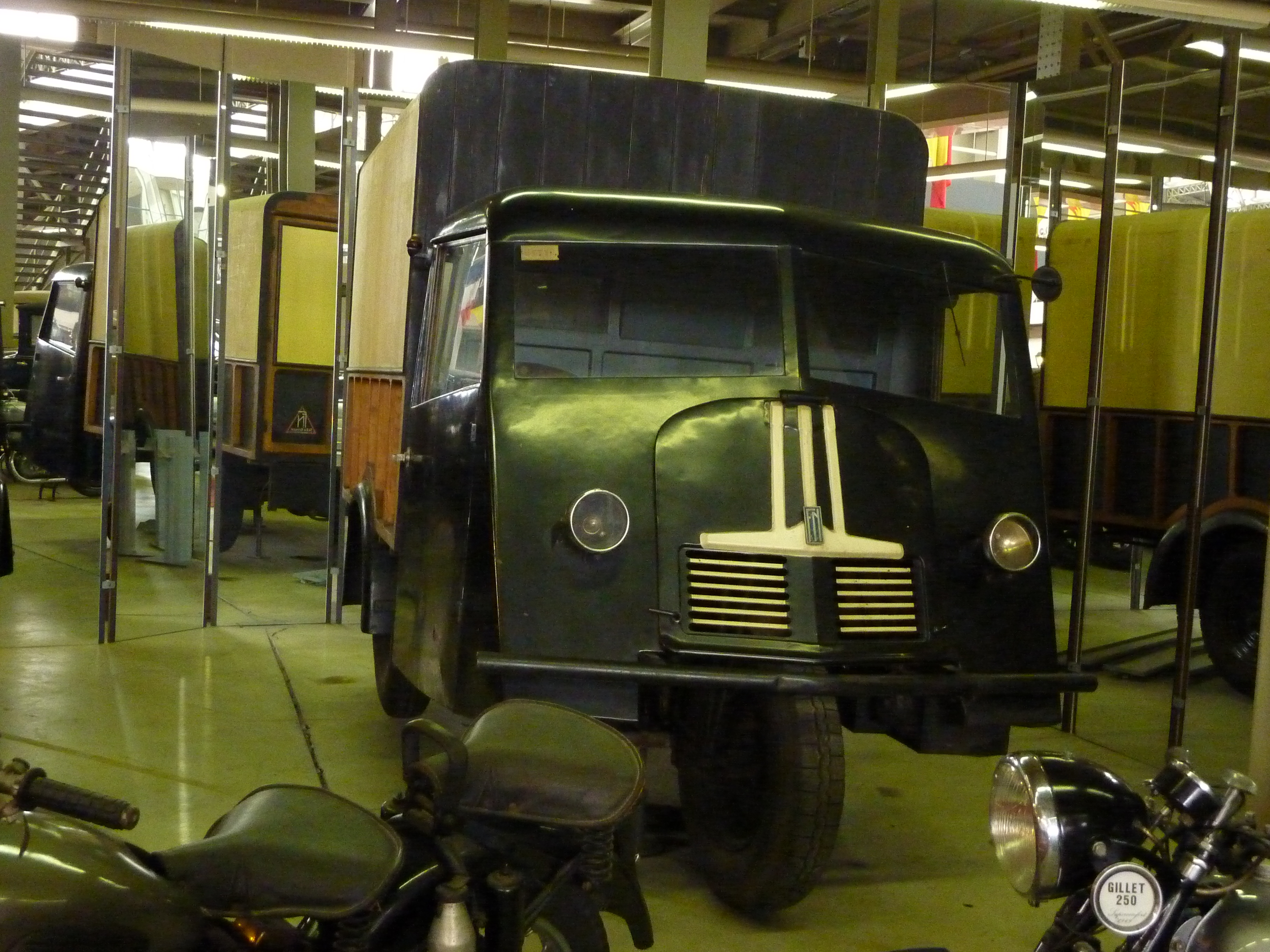
FN Tricar

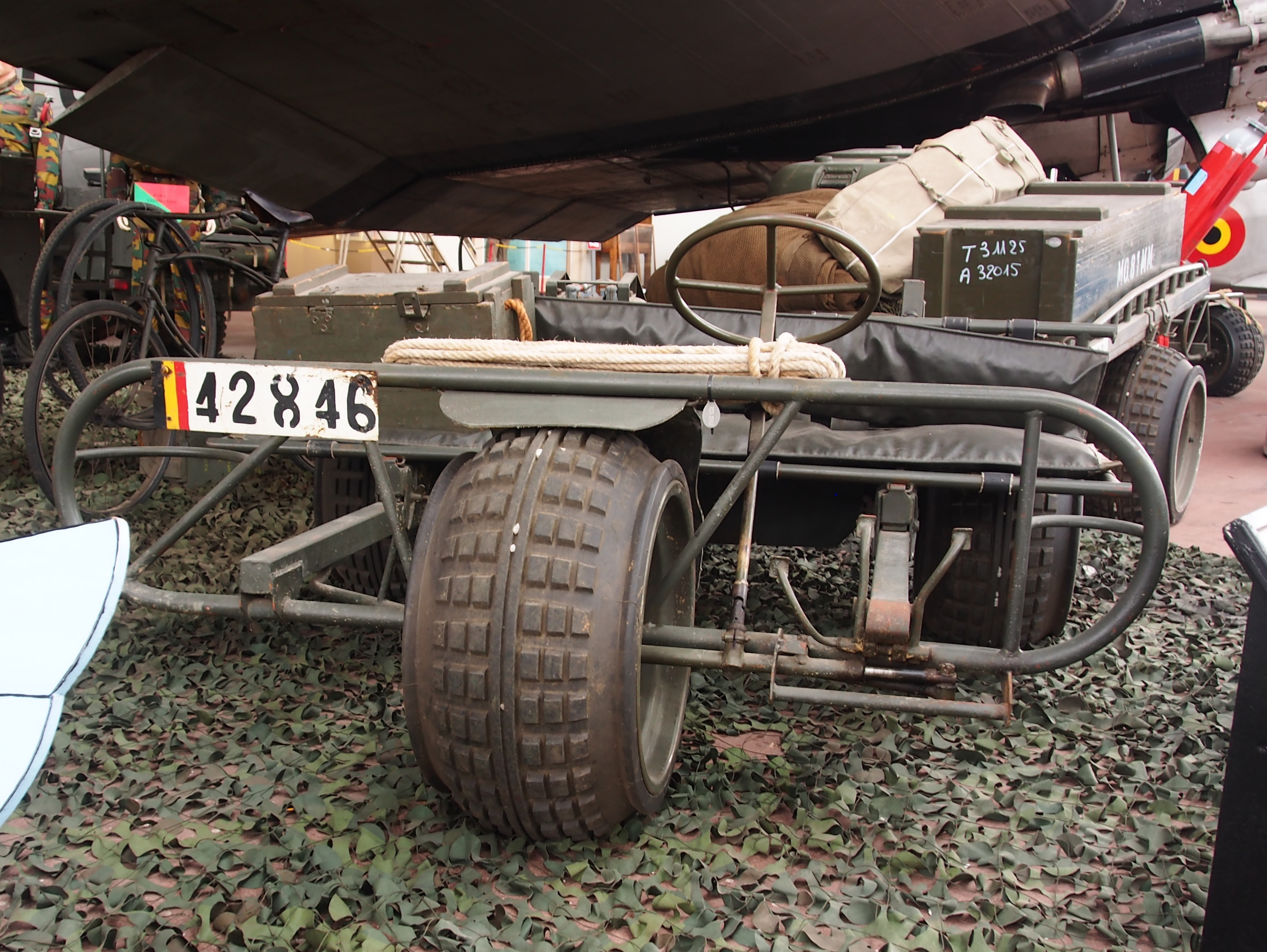
Fabrique Nationale AS 24

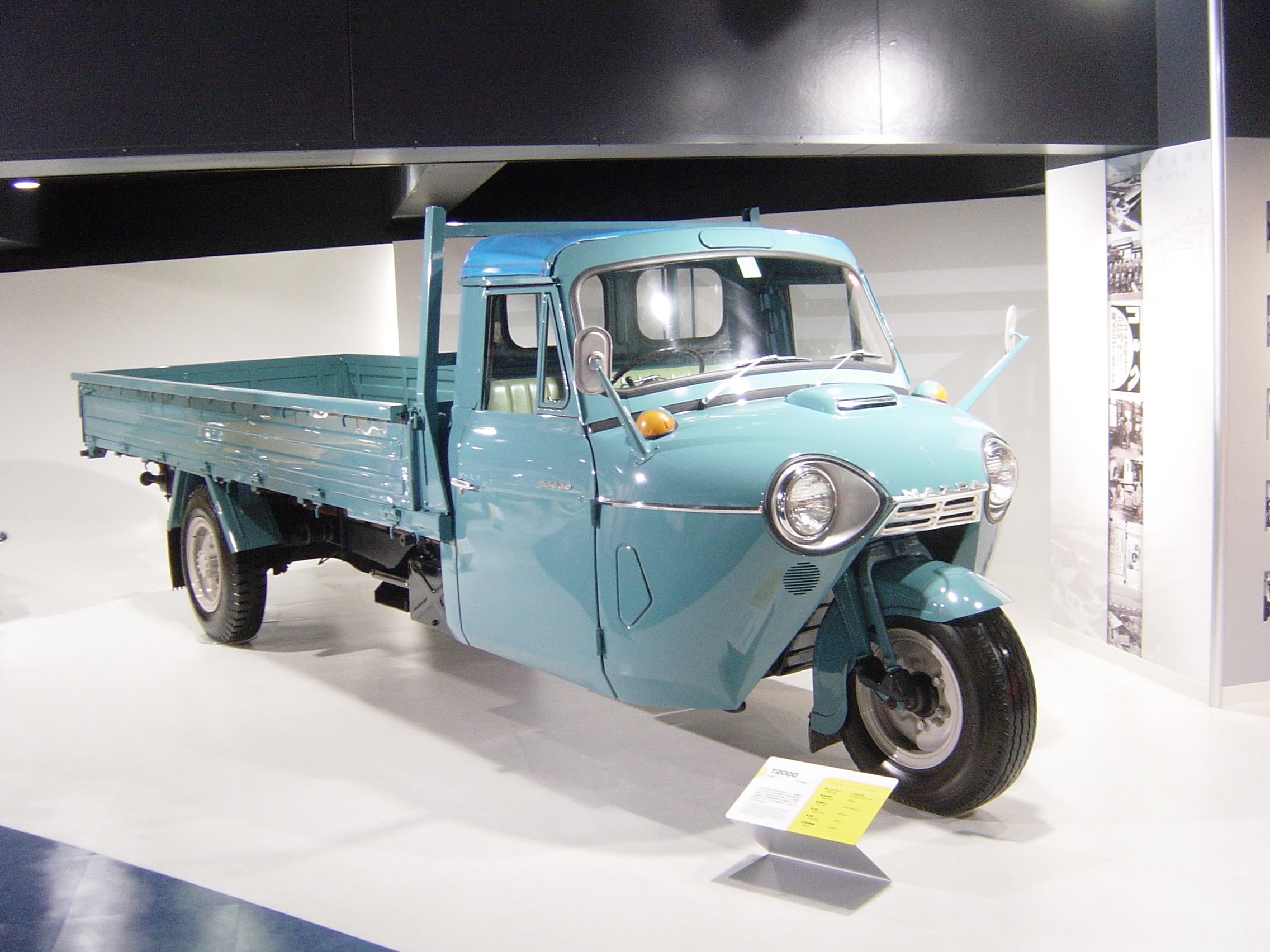
Mazda T2000 truck 1957–1974, length 6.08 m, width 1.84 m, max speed 100 km/h

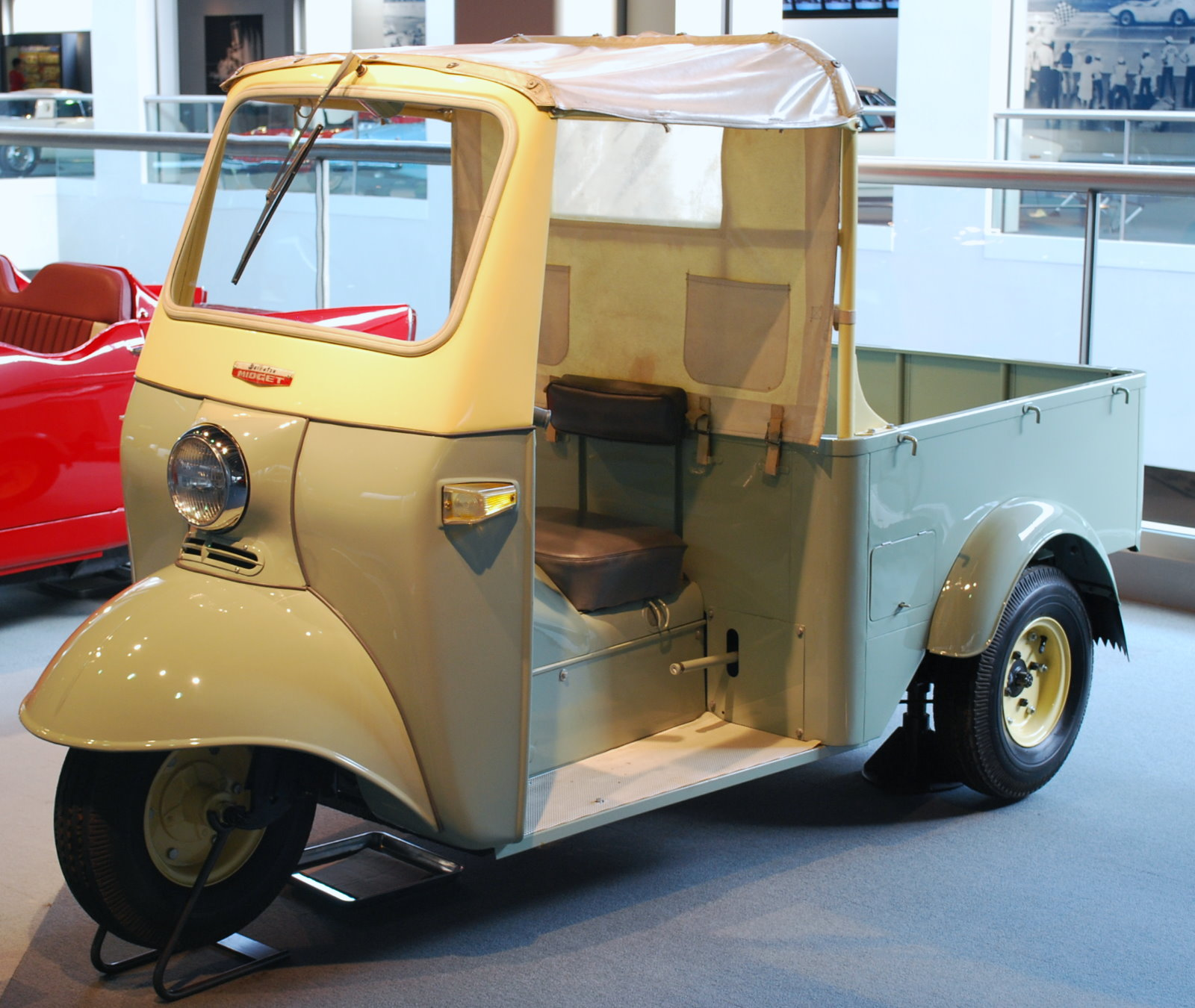
An early Daihatsu Midget, which would serve as the basis for auto rickshaws that proliferate across South and Southeast Asia

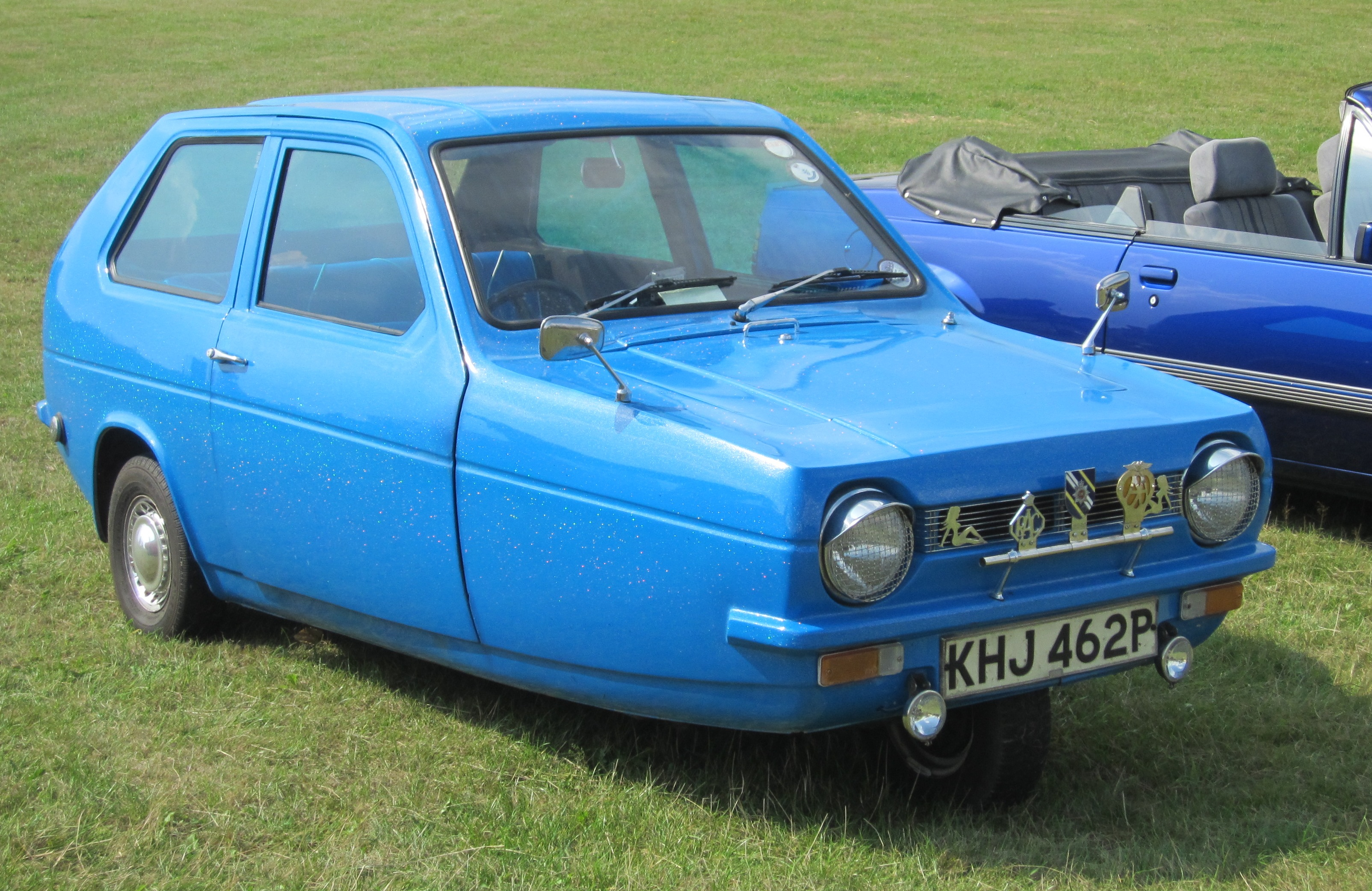
Reliant Robin 3-wheeler car.

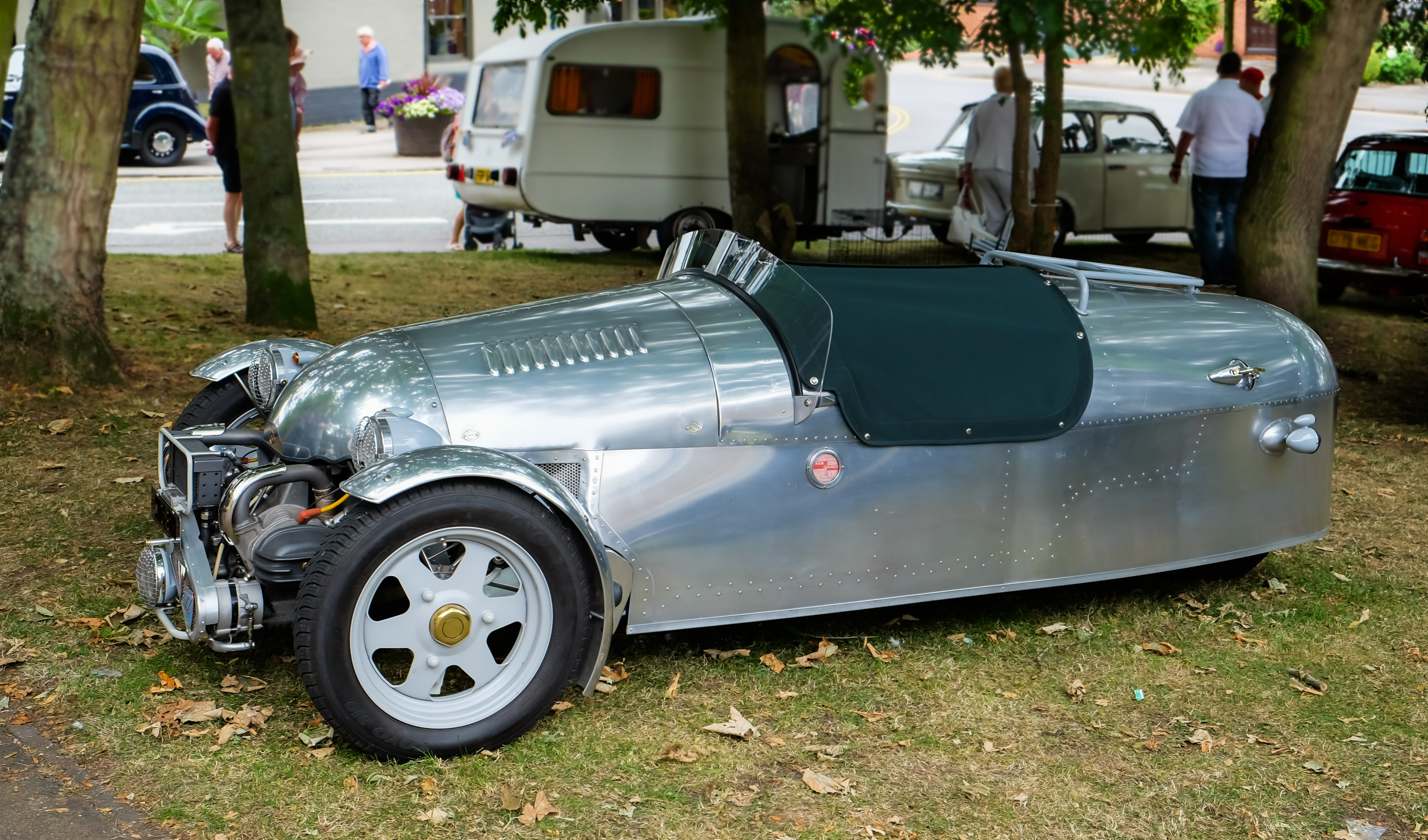
2016 Pembleton Supersports

== Configurations ==
Diagram comparing delta and tadpole layouts

=== Two front ===
A configuration of two wheels in the front and one wheel at the back presents two advantages: it has improved aerodynamics, and that it readily enables the use of a small lightweight motorcycle powerplant and rear wheel. This approach was used by the Messerschmitt KR200 and BMW Isetta. Alternatively, a more conventional front-engine, front wheel drive layout as is common in four-wheeled cars can be used, with subsequent advantages for transversal stability (the center of mass is further to the front) and traction (two driven wheels instead of one). Some vehicles have a front engine driving the single rear wheel, similar to the rear engine driving the rear wheel. The wheel must support acceleration loads as well as lateral forces when in a turn, and loss of traction can be a challenge.

A new tadpole configuration has been proposed with a rear engine driving the front wheels. This concept (Dragonfly Three Wheeler) claims both stability and traction (two driven wheels), as well as a unique driving experience.

With two wheels in the front (the "tadpole" form or "reverse trike") the vehicle is far more stable in braking turns, but remains more prone to overturning in normal turns compared to an equivalent four-wheeled vehicle, unless the center of mass is lower and/or further forward. Motorcycle-derived designs suffer from most of the weight being toward the rear of the vehicle.

For lower wind resistance (which increases fuel efficiency), a teardrop shape is often used. A teardrop is wide and round at the front, tapering at the back. The three-wheel configuration allows the two front wheels to create the wide round surface of the vehicle. The single rear wheel allows the vehicle to taper at the back. Examples include the Aptera (solar electric vehicle) and Myers Motors NmG.

=== Two rear ===
Having one wheel in front and two in the rear for power reduces the cost of the steering mechanism but greatly decreases lateral stability when cornering while braking.

When the single wheel is in the front (the "delta" form, as in a child's pedal tricycle), the vehicle is inherently unstable in a braking turn, as the combined tipping forces at the center of mass from turning and braking can rapidly extend beyond the triangle formed by the contact patches of the wheels. This type, if not tipped, also has a greater tendency to spin out ("swap ends") when handled roughly.

=== Lateral stability ===
The disadvantage of a three-wheel configuration is that lateral stability is lower than with a four-wheeled vehicle.

With any vehicle, an imaginary line can be projected from the vehicles centre of mass to the ground, representing the force exerted on the vehicle by its mass. With the vehicle stationary, the line will be vertical. As the vehicle accelerates, that imaginary line tilts backward, remaining anchored to the centre of mass the point at which the line intersects the ground moves backward. As you brake it moves forward, with cornering it moves sideward. Should the point at which this line intersects the ground move outside of the boundary formed by connecting the tyre contact patches together (a rectangle for a four-wheeled car, or a triangle for a trike) then the vehicle will tip and eventually fall over. This is true for any vehicle.

With all vehicles it is critical that the vehicle should be engineered to slide before this point of instability is reached.

This can be achieved in several ways:

- by placing the center of mass closer to the ground
- by placing the center of mass closer to the axle with two wheels (for three wheelers)
- by increasing the track width
- by limiting the grip provided by the tyres, such that the vehicle loses adhesion before it starts to tip.
- By tilting some or all of the vehicle as it corners.

In the case of a three-wheeled ATV, tipping may be avoided by the rider leaning into turns.

== Tilting option ==
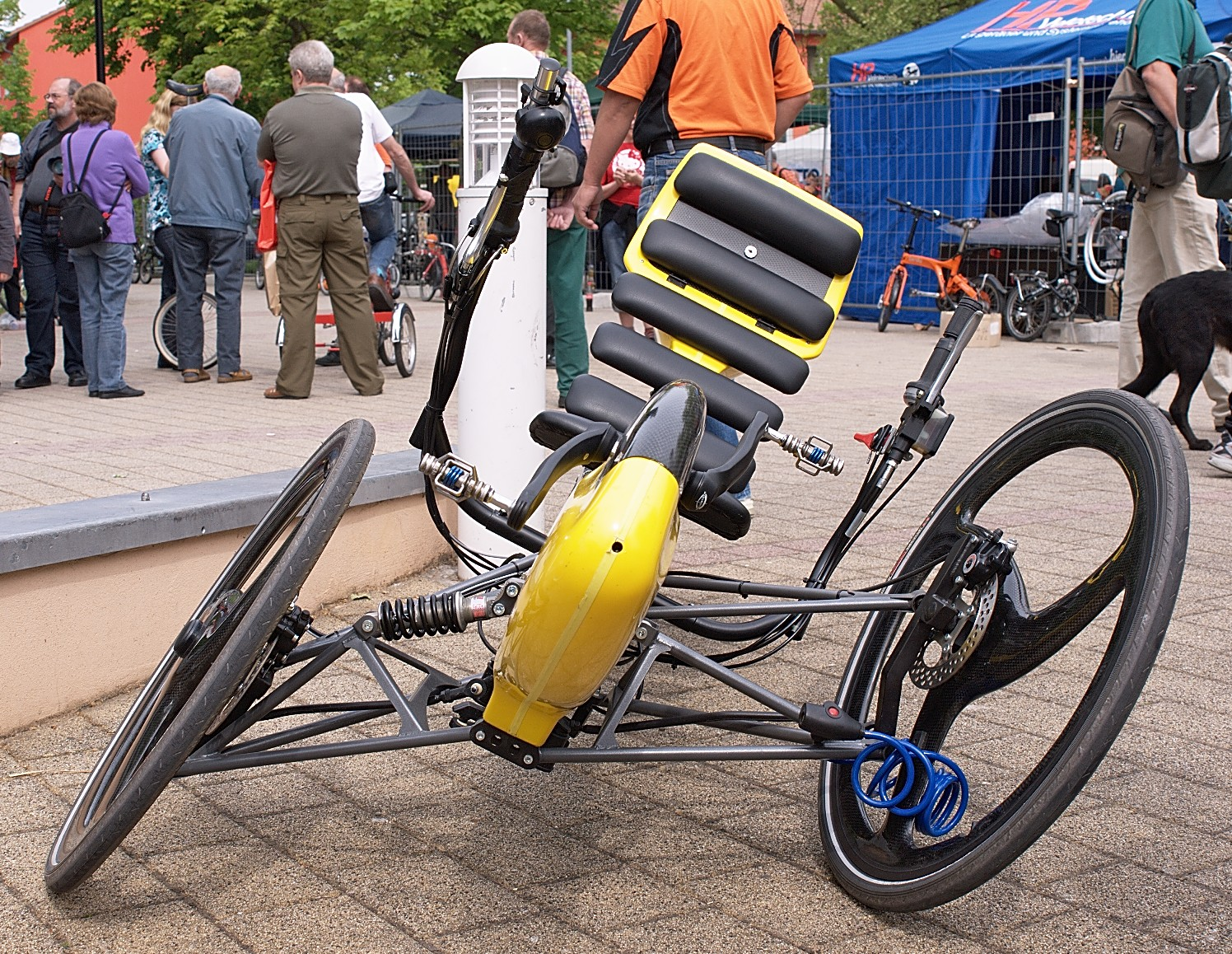
Tripendo recumbent tricycle, a tilting three-wheeler

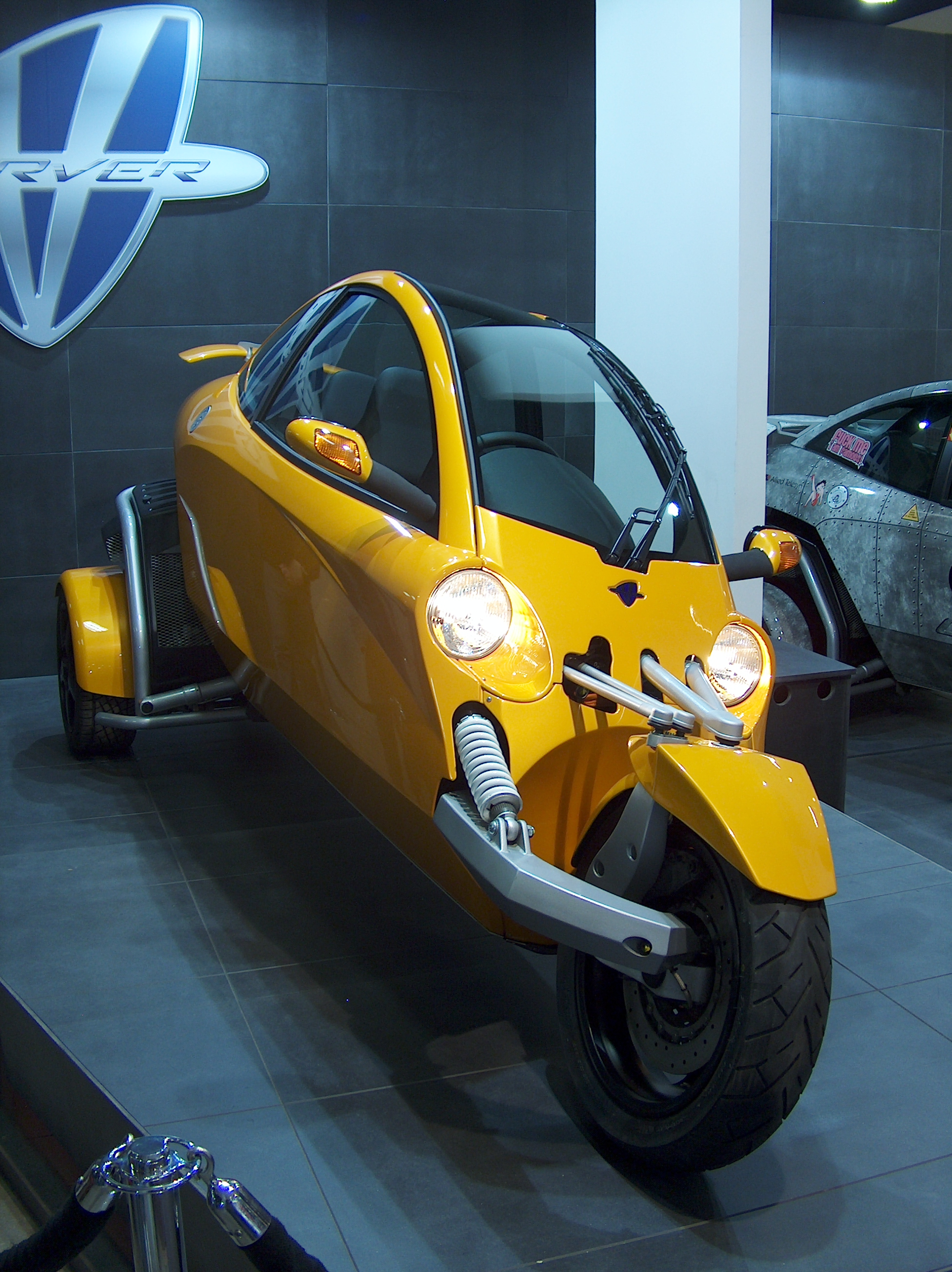
Vandenbrink Carver

To improve stability some three-wheelers are designed to tilt while cornering like a motorcyclist would do. The tilt may be controlled manually, mechanically or by computer.

A tilting three-wheeler's body or wheels, or both, tilt in the direction of the turn. Such vehicles can corner safely even with a narrow track.

Some tilting three-wheelers could be considered to be forms of feet forward motorcycles or cabin motorcycles or both.

== Electric three wheelers ==
=== Battery-powered three wheelers ===
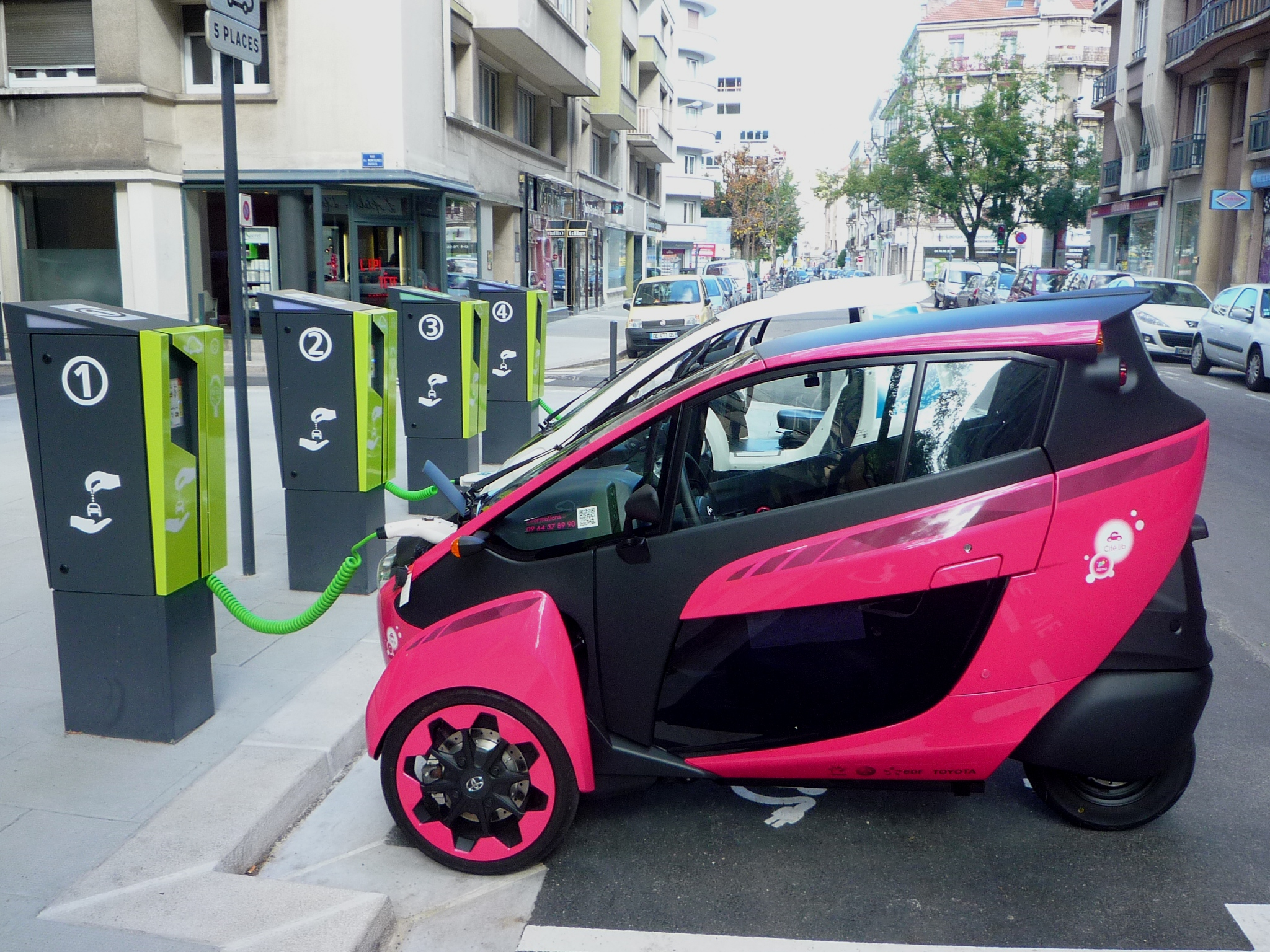
Toyota i-Road, a three-wheeled battery powered personal mobility vehicle

Three-wheeled battery powered designs include:

- Aptera (solar electric vehicle)
- Arcimoto
- CityEl
- Commuter Cars Tango
- Cree SAM
- ElectraMeccanica SOLO
- Myers Motors NmG (formerly Corbin Sparrow)
- Nobe GT100
- Toyota i-Road
- Triac
- Vanderhall Edison 2
- ZAP Xebra
- EWheels EW 36(mobility scooter)

=== Solar-powered three wheelers ===
Here are three notable examples of solar-powered three wheelers; two race cars, the Infinium and the Sky Ace TIGA, and a vehicle planned for production, the Aptera.

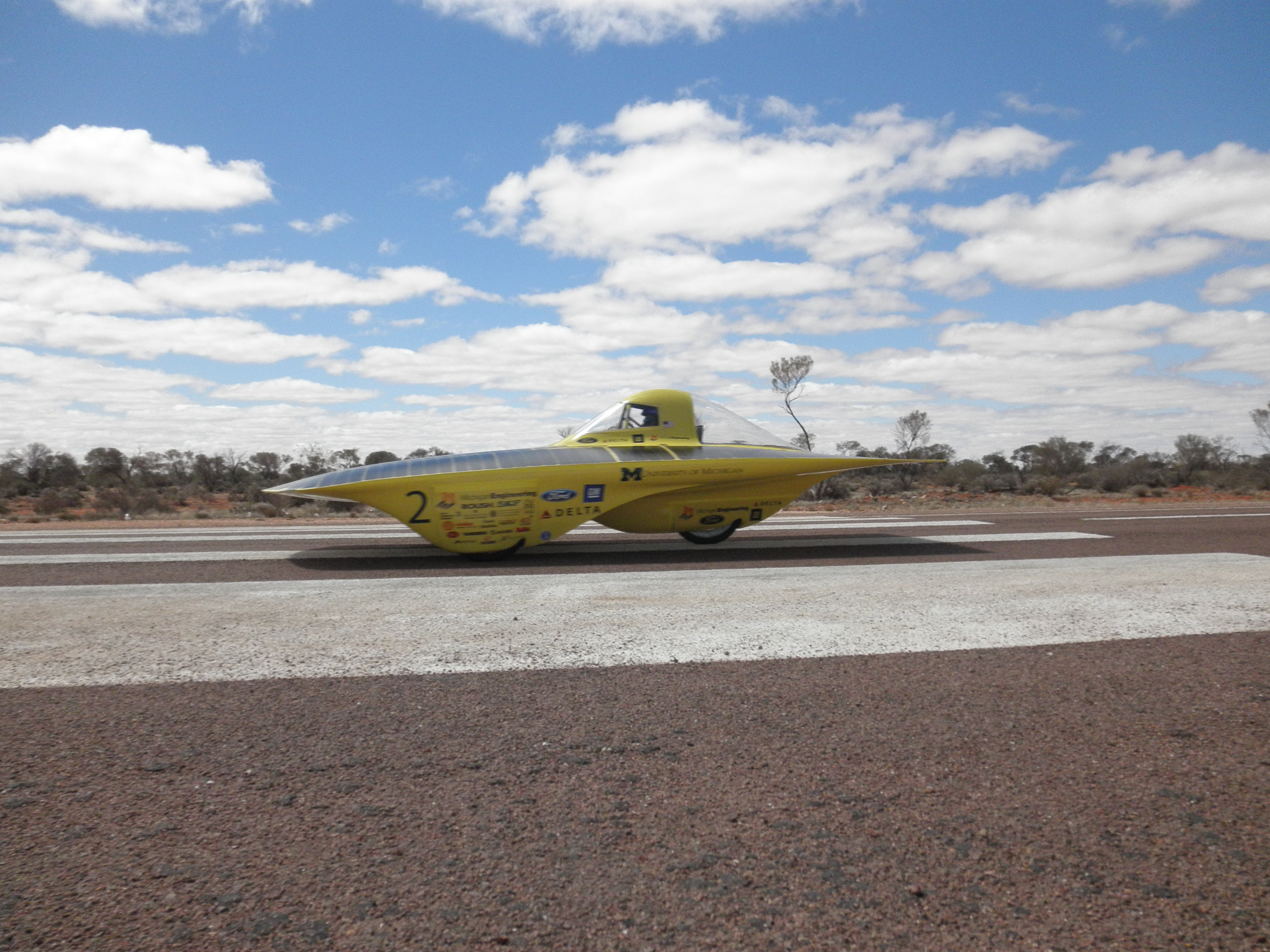
Infinium, winner of 2010 American Solar Challenge

The Infinium, built by the University of Michigan Solar Car Team, came in 3rd place in the 2009 World Solar Challenge held in Australia, and won the 2010 American Solar Challenge.

Ashiya University's Sky Ace TIGA achieved 91.332 kilometres per hour (56.751 mph) at Shimojishima Airport, in Miyakojima, Okinawa, Japan, to win the Guinness World Record, on 20 August 2014. It took the record from another three-wheeler, Sunswift IV, designed and built at the University of New South Wales in Australia, by a margin of almost 3 km/h.

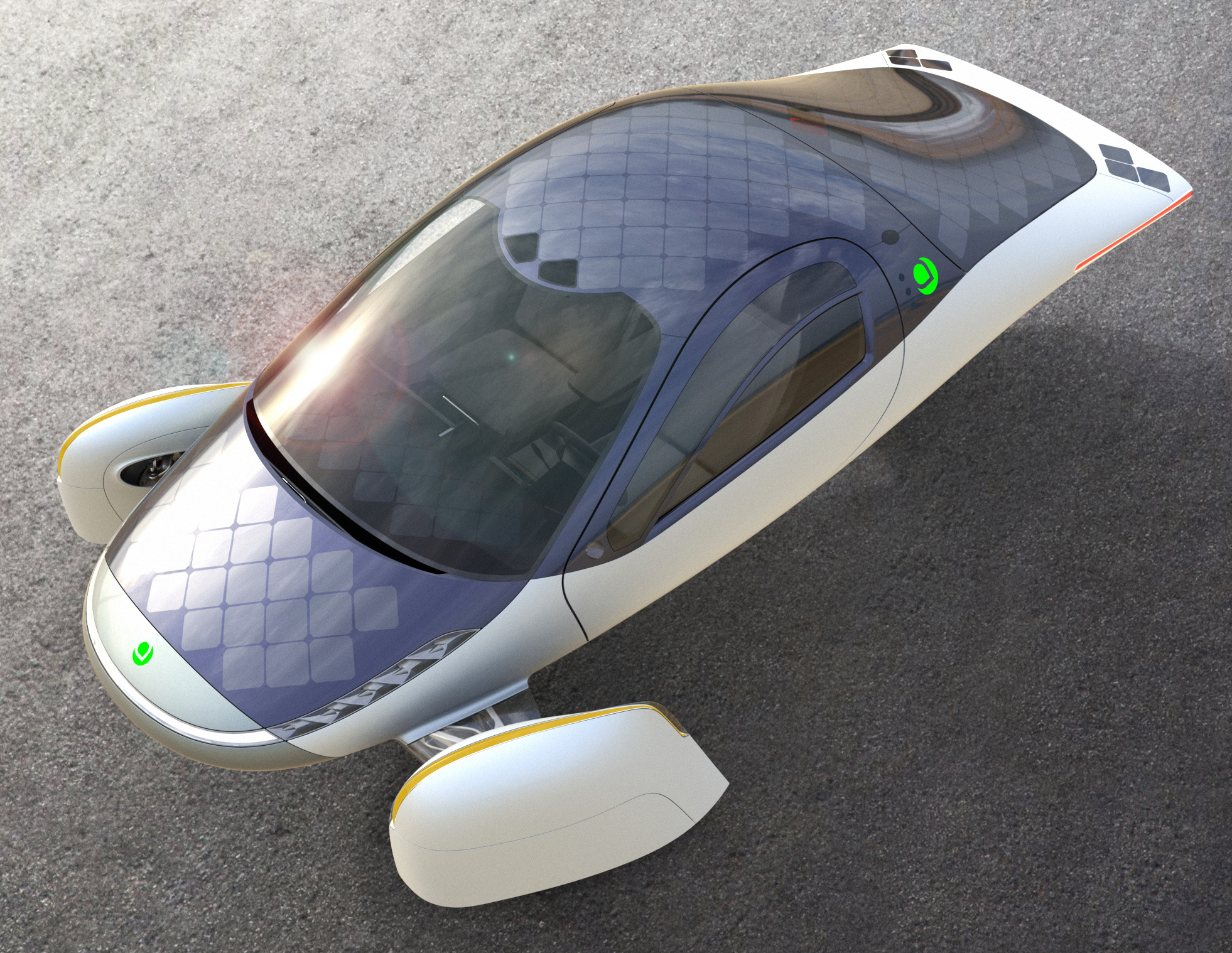
Solar panels on the hood, roof, dashboard and hatch of the Aptera EV

The Aptera solar electric vehicle uses a tadpole layout and is being designed to have a top speed of over 100 mph. The first production Aptera uses a 201-hp (150 kW) permanent-magnet electric motor, supplied by Vitesco. Later versions may use 42 KW in-wheel electric motors and can be ordered with two (front-wheel drive) or three (all-wheel drive) motors. The Aptera's roof and dashboard, and optionally its hood and hatch, are fitted with solar panels, with the full complement being designed to add a range of up to 40 miles per day and 11,000 miles per year in the sunniest climates. First customer availability is planned for before the end of 2026.

== Steam-powered three wheelers ==
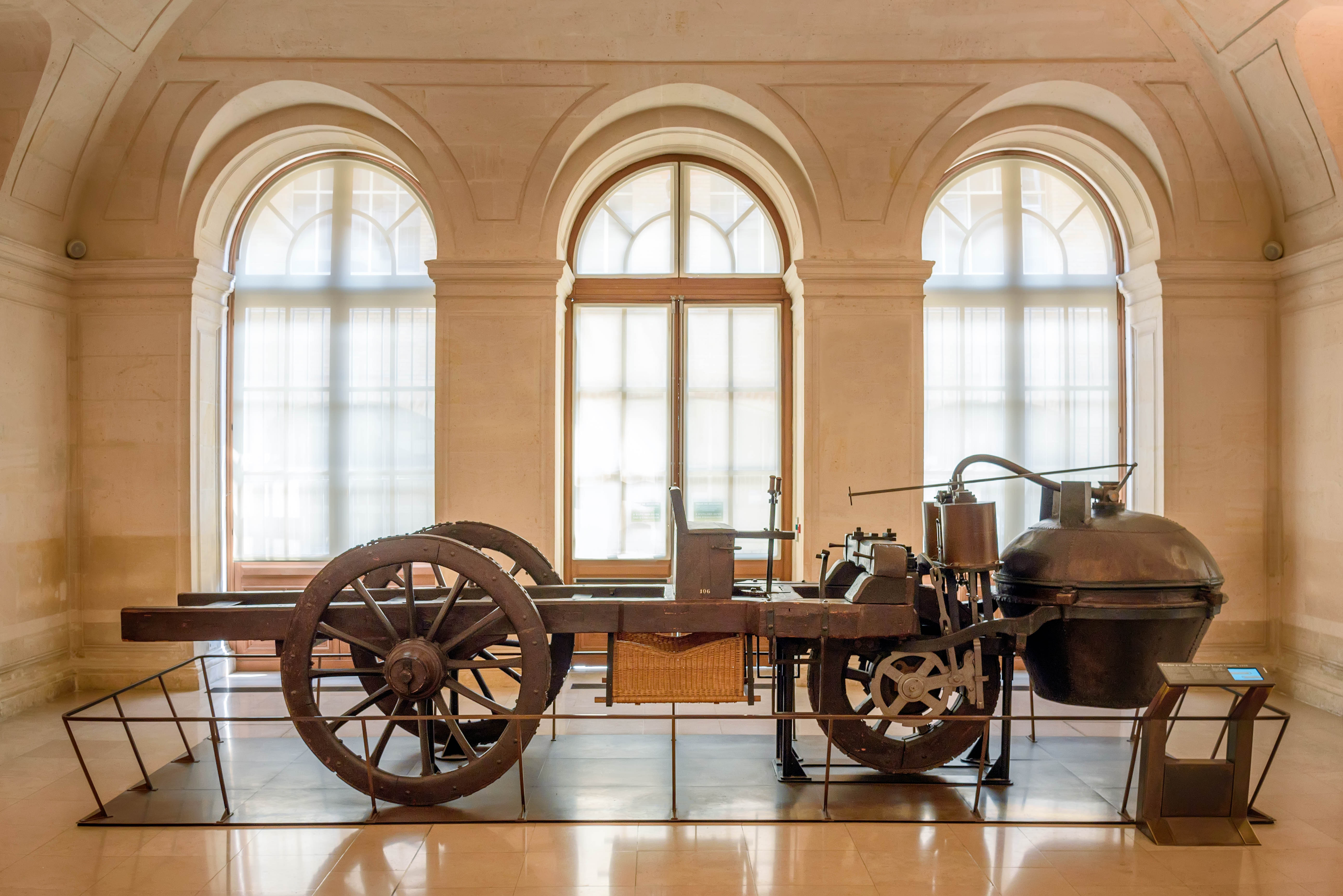
Cugnot's fardier à vapeur, as preserved at the Musée des Arts et Métiers, Paris, France

The world's first full-size self-propelled land vehicle was a three-wheeler. French Army Captain Nicolas-Joseph Cugnot's 1770 fardier à vapeur (steam dray), a steam tricycle with a top speed of around 3 km/h (2 mph), was intended for hauling artillery.

Another of the earliest preserved examples is the Long steam tricycle, built by George A. Long around 1880 and patented in 1883, now on display at the Smithsonian Institution.

== Wind-powered three wheelers ==
The Whike is a recumbent tricycle with a sail, made in the Netherlands.

== All-terrain vehicles ==
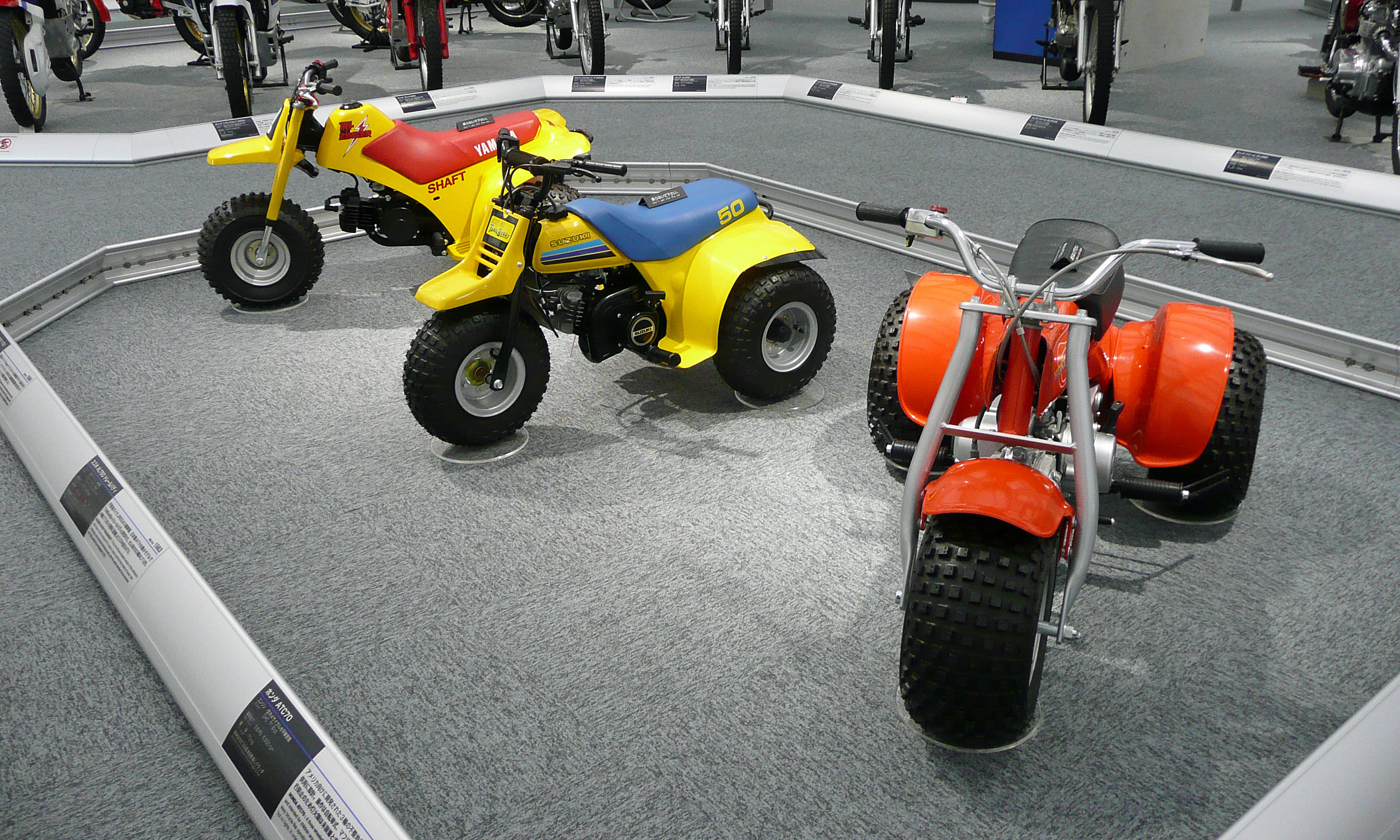
Honda, Suzuki and Yamaha all-terrain vehicles

Due to the incidence of injuries and deaths related to their use, a 10-year ban, entirely voluntary for manufacturers, was placed on the sale of new three-wheeled all-terrain vehicles in the United States in January 1988. More injuries were sustained by riders by not applying a proper riding technique, and lack of wearing proper safety gear such as helmets and riding boots. In a search conducted by the Consumer Product Safety Commission, it was determined that "no inherent flaw was found in the three wheel design".

== Registration ==
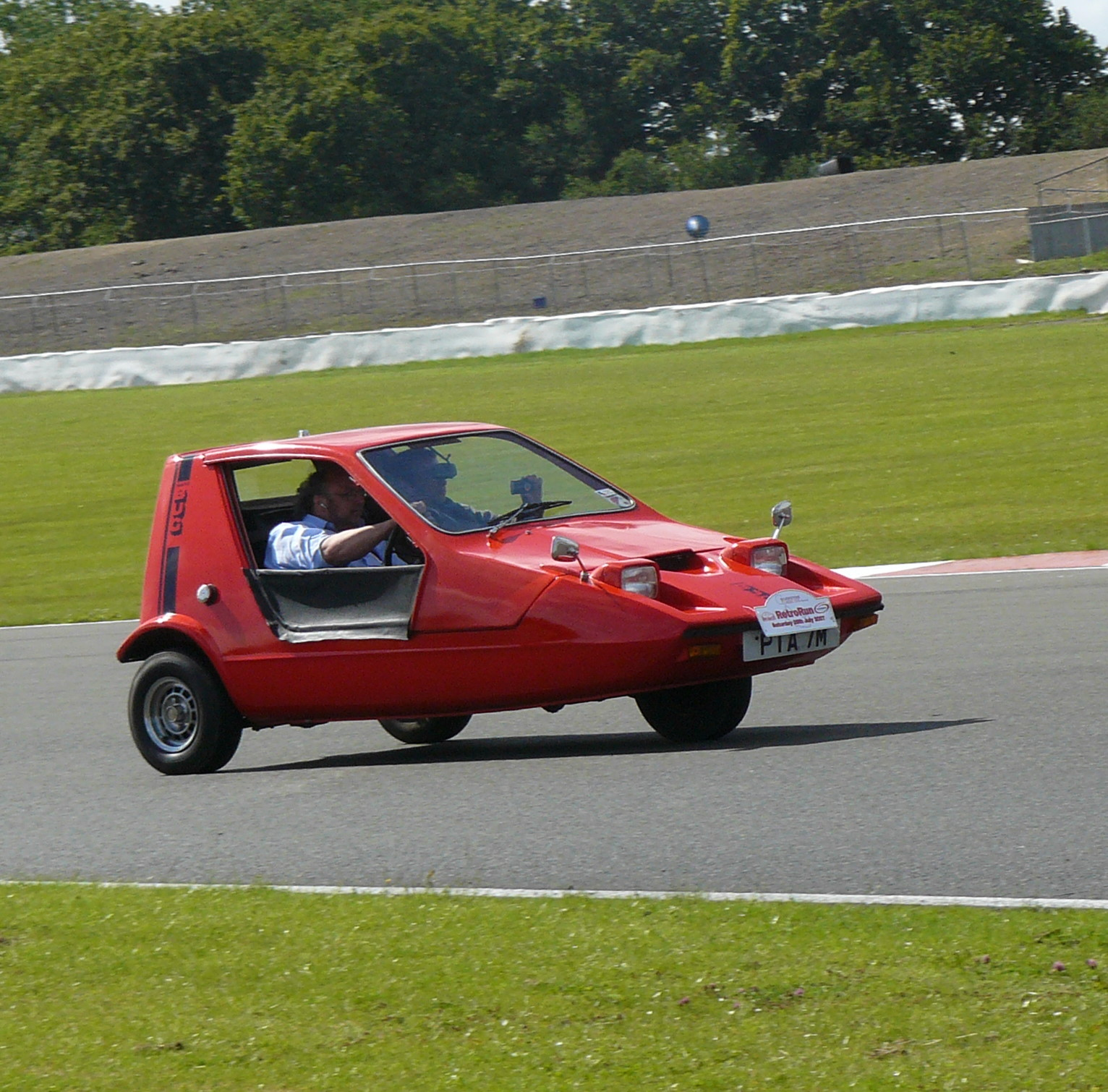
Bond Bug at Silverstone

In the U.S, the National Highway Traffic Safety Administration defines and regulates three-wheeled vehicles as motorcycles. However, in 2015 a bill was introduced in Congress that would prevent some three-wheeled vehicles from being classified as motorcycles in the United States, instead creating a new classification for "autocycles".

Driver's license and registration requirements vary on a state-by-state basis. Some states require drivers of three-wheeled vehicles to have a motorcycle license and register the vehicle as a motorcycle. Some states, including Virginia, Kansas, and Indiana, classify some three-wheeled vehicles as autocycles. Virginia defines an autocycle as "a three-wheeled motor vehicle that has a steering wheel and seating that does not require the operator to straddle or sit astride and is manufactured to comply with federal safety requirements for motorcycles." Indiana defines it as "a three (3) wheeled motor vehicle in which the operator and passenger ride in a completely or partially enclosed seating area that is equipped with: (1) a rollcage or roll hoops; (2) safety belts for each occupant; and (3) antilock brakes; and is designed to be controlled with a steering wheel and pedals." In other jurisdictions, such as British Columbia, Canada, and Connecticut, a three-wheeled vehicle with an enclosed passenger compartment or partially enclosed seat is considered an automobile.

== Examples ==
=== Two front wheels ===
Name	Country	Years manufactured	Comments
Léon Bollée Voiturette	France	1895–?	
TriPodCars Tripod 1	Australia	2012–?	400 kg Reverse Trike, Bandit 1250, ZX14R (200+ hp) and EV
Berkeley Cars Berkeley T60	England	1959	
Egg	Switzerland	1896–99	
Advance 6 hp air-cooled Tri Car and 9 hp water-cooled Tri Car	England	1902–12	
Humber Tricar	England	1904	
Riley Olympia Tricar	England	1904	
Mars Carette	England	1904–05	Mars Motors Co existed in Finchley, London, White and Poppe water-cooled engine, Single-cylinder, 3.3 kW
Lagonda Tricar	England	1904–07	total production: 69 cars
Anglian	England	1905–07	
Armadale	England	1906–07	
Ranger Cub	England	1970–1980	Reverse Trike/Tadpole, A-Series engine 848-1275cc
Morgan V-Twin and F-Series	England	1911–39, 1932–52	Morgan Super Sports 2-Seater 1937
American Tri-Car	United States	1912	
Birmingham Small Arms Company Three Wheeler	England	1929–36	1100cc engine
Zaschka	Germany	1929	Folding three-wheeler: Zaschka Three-wheeler 1929
Dymaxion car	United States	1933	Concept car designed by Buckminster Fuller
Mathis VEL 333	France	1946	3 seats, flat-twin front engine, aluminium body, production less than 10 units
Fend Flitzer	Germany	1948–1951	1 seat, Messerschmitt kabinenroller precursor, production about 250 units
1951 Hoffmann	Germany	1951	2 seats, aluminium body, engine mounted on the rear wheel steering pivot
Velorex Oskar and other models	Czechoslovakia	1951–71	Originally with leather bodies
Isetta	UK	1957–62	Three-wheeled version of the Isetta built in the UK to take advantage of tax and licensing regulations
Scootacar	UK	1957–64	
Messerschmitt KR175	Germany	1953–55	
Messerschmitt KR200	Germany	1955–64	
Peel P50	Isle of Man	1963–64	Smallest production car ever built
HM Vehicles Free-way	United States	1979–82	
Campagna T-Rex	Canada	1996–present	
Malone Car Company F1000|Skunk SS|TAZR	United Kingdom	1999–present	High-power internal combustion and pure electric versions released November 2010
Cree SAM	Switzerland	2001	Electric, only 80 produced
Myers Motors NmG ("No more Gas") (formerly the Corbin Sparrow)	United States	2006–present	Single-occupant all-electric plug-in
BRP Can-Am Spyder RoadsterCan-Am Spyder Roadster	Canada	2007–present	The Can-Am Spyder is a three-wheeled motorcycle manufactured by Bombardier Recreational Products.
Brudeli 645L	Norway	2008–	
Moonbeam	United States	2008–present	100 mpg DIY, fabric-covered car based on parts from two Honda 150cc motorscooters
Triac	United States	2009–2011	Electric, never entered production
XR-3 Hybrid	United States	Plans–2008, Kit–2009	Front 3-cylinder diesel (125 mpg), rear electric 40 mile range (220 mpg when used as a hybrid)
Aptera (solar electric vehicle)	United States	2026 planned	Solar-powered and plug-in Electric
Triton Trike	United States	2000–present	Gas-powered, 42+ mpg, front-wheel drive, custom builds and kits available
Nobe GT100	Estonia & United States	2021 planned	Electric, powered at all 3 wheels
Polaris Slingshot	United States	2015–present	
Vanderhall Laguna Roadster	United States	2016–2018	Exotic Auto-cycle, mono-aluminum chassis, carbon fiber body, 200 HP, 1550 pounds dry weight, side-by-side seating, fwd. 1.4 liter turbo GM power plant. 6 speed Automatic with paddle shift option. Manufactured by Vanderhall Motor Works in Provo, Utah U.S.A
Vanderhall Venice	United States	2017–present	The mainstay of the Vanderhall line up, the Venice brings the soul of roadster motoring while extending effortless performance in kind.
Vanderhall Carmel	United States	2020–present	The Vanderhall Carmel brings more luxury and convenience to the Carmel lineup. With provisions to accommodate a removable capshade, the Carmel promises additional class and comfort for your journey.
Vanderhall Edison	United States	2020–present	The Edison2: A fully electric roadster that combines refined and eye-catching design while maintaining classic, elegant lines. Unplug and play has been redefined
Elio Motors	Shreveport, LA, United States	Awaiting funding	Two passenger fully enclosed cockpit with car controls
Girfalco Azkarra	Canada	2017	All-electric two-passenger three-wheeled vehicle, possibly the quickest three-wheeler
Go3Wheeler	United States	2014	single person three wheeler
Piaggio MP3			
Tri-Magnum	United States		Tilting 3-wheeler capable of seating two people.
Volkswagen GX3			
Morgan 3-Wheeler	England	2012–present	The power train is a 1983cc 'V-twin' fuel injected engine mated to a Mazda 5 speed (and reverse) gearbox
Fuel Vapours Alé	Canada	2005–present	Prototype. Gets 92 mpg.
Arcimoto FUV	United States	2019–present	Two passenger all-electric, 102 mile range City
Fiberfab Scarab STM	United States	1976	Kit car with canopy door manufactured by Fiberfab
Bricklin 3EV	United States	Planned	Two passenger electric vehicle from Malcolm Bricklin.

=== Two rear wheels ===
Name	Country	Years manufactured	Comments
Apino	Brazil	unknown	Mini Truck
Benz Patent Motorwagen	Germany	1886–93	
Eco-Fueler	USA	2009–2011	2 seater built in Oregon.
La Va Bon Train	France	1904–10	50–100 believed built
Davis D-2 Divan	United States	1947–48	about 13–17 built, including the 494, a Jeep-like military vehicle
Scammell Scarab	England	1948–67	
Autoette	United States	1948–70	
Daihatsu Bee	Japan	1951–1952	
Daihatsu Midget	Japan	1957–72	
Mazda T-2000	Japan	1957–74	
Mazda K360	Japan	1959–69	
Mazda T600	Japan	1959–71	
Kia K-360	South Korea	1962–1973	Kia's first truck (OEM Mazda K-360)
Kia T-1500	South Korea	1963–?	1484 cc, 60 hp, four cylinder and a maximum load of 1.5 tons. (OEM Mazda T-1500)
Kia T-600	South Korea	1969–1974	577cc, 20 HP and 500 kg load. Top speed of 75 km/h. 7726 produced (OEM Mazda T-600)
Kia T-2000	South Korea	1967–1981	1985 cc, 81 hp, four cylinder and a maximum load of 2 tons. 15952 produced (OEM Mazda T-2000)
Piaggio Ape	Italy	1948–present	
Electra-King	United States	1964?–1980s?	Two-seater electric car
Bond 875	England	1965–70	
Bond Bug	England	1970–74	
Reliant Robin	England	1973–81, 1989–2002	
Reliant Regal	England	1953–1973	An example of this vehicle is the iconic van belonging to Del Boy and Rodney Trotter in the long-running BBC sitcom Only Fools and Horses, though it is often incorrectly referred to as a Reliant Robin.
GM Lean Machine	United States	1980s	Tilt, concept car
TriVette	United States	1974–1976	
Twike	Germany	1995–present	Electric-human-power hybrid, developed in Switzerland
ZAP Xebra	United States	2006–2009	electric power
eTuk	United States	2014–	re-designed tuk tuk for the US Market, including an all-electric motor
Snyder ST600-c	United States	2011–2012	Imported by Snyder Technologies / Wildfire Motors, this is a rebrand of the Fulu Motors 富路金骏马, Fulu Jinjunma in English. Referred to as the 09 golden horse internally.
Carver	Netherlands	2007–2009	Tilt
CityEl	Denmark		Mini-El, City-El
CLEVER			
Harley-Davidson; Servi-Car	United States	1932–1973	
Harley-Davidson; Tri Glide	United States	since 2009	

== See also ==
- Four-wheeler
