= ElectraMeccanica Solo =

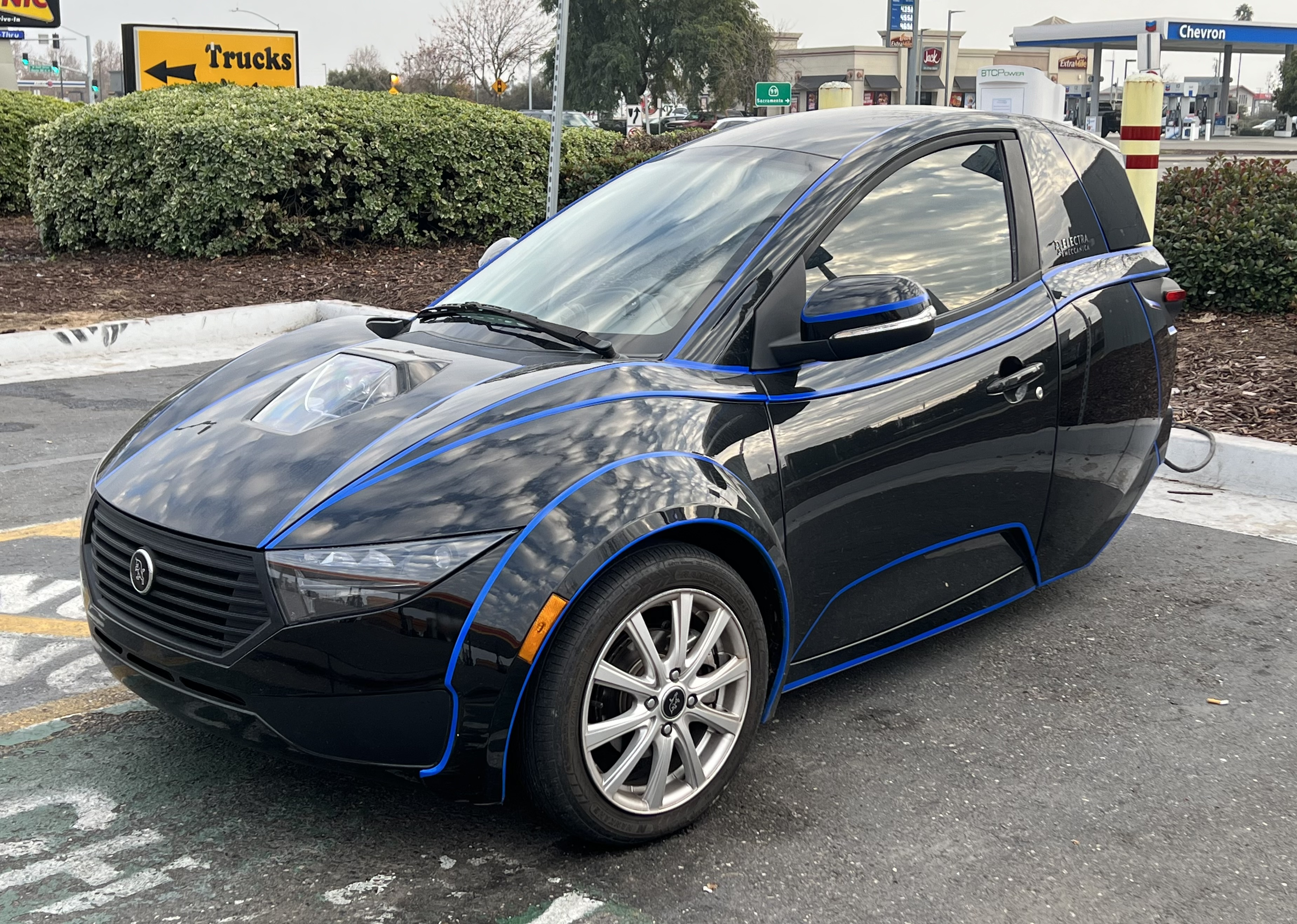

Overview
- Manufacturer: ElectraMeccanica
- Production: 2018–2023
- Assembly: Canada: New Westminster; China: Chongqing; United States: Mesa

Body and chassis
- Class: Battery electric microcar
- Body style: 2-door coupe

Dimensions
- Wheelbase: 80 in (2,032 mm)
- Length: 122 in (3,099 mm)
- Width: 61 in (1,549 mm)
- Height: 53 in (1,346 mm)
- Curb weight: 2,176 lb (987 kg)

The ElectraMeccanica Solo is a single-passenger, three-wheeled, battery electric vehicle, produced by ElectraMeccanica from 2018 to 2023.

== History ==
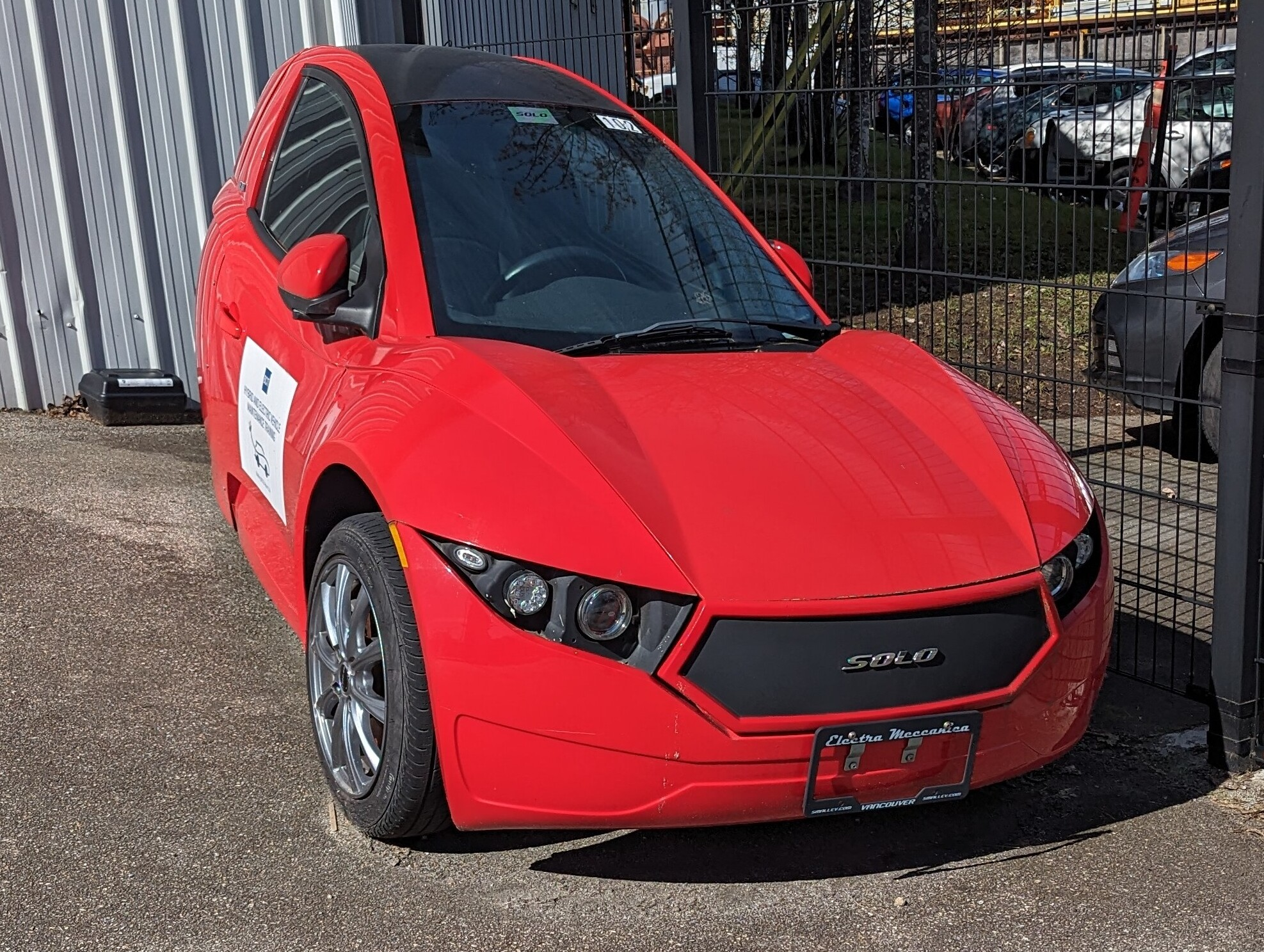
ElectraMeccanica Solo prototype without a centre headlight

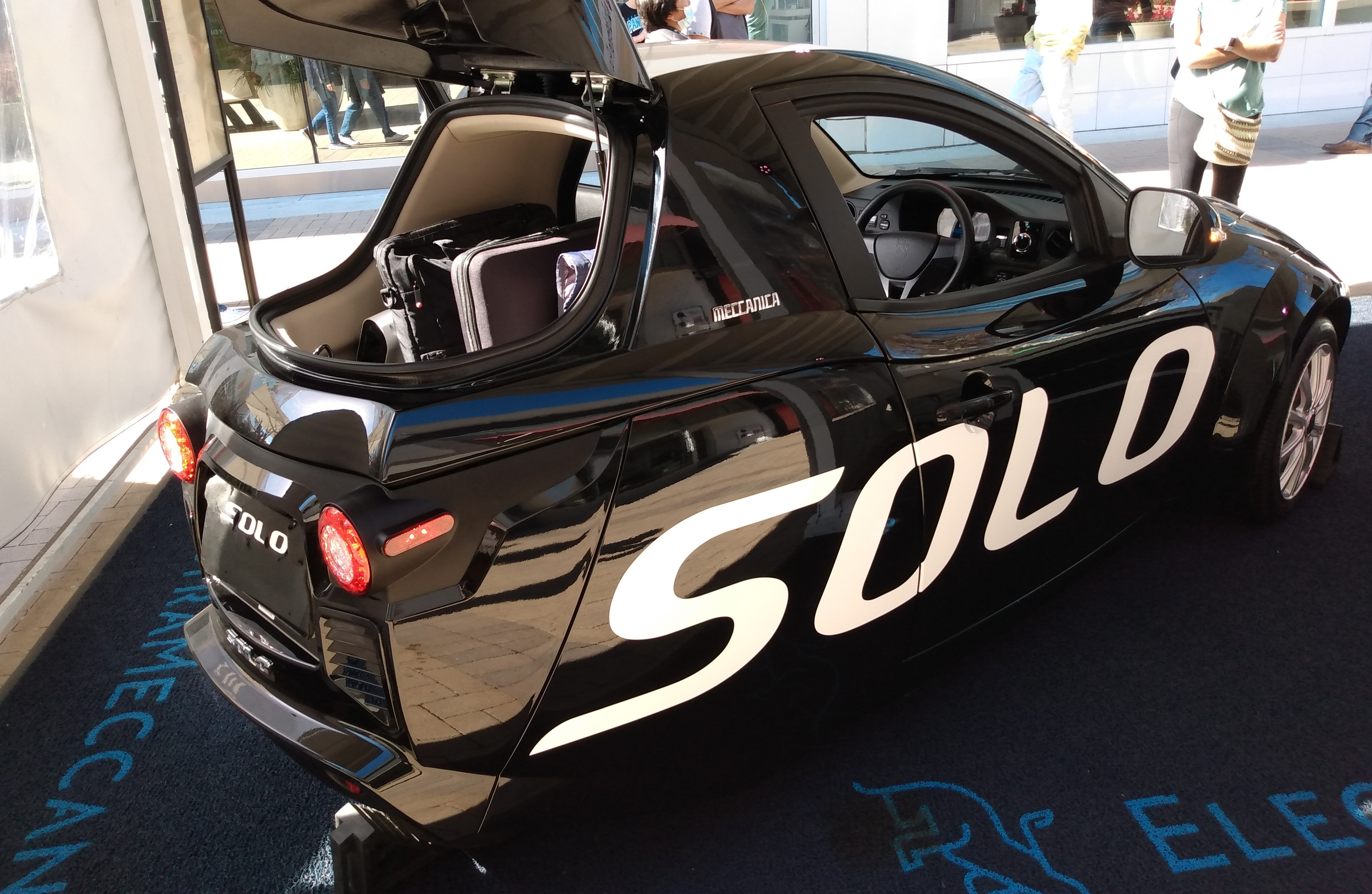
Rear view of the ElectraMeccanica Solo

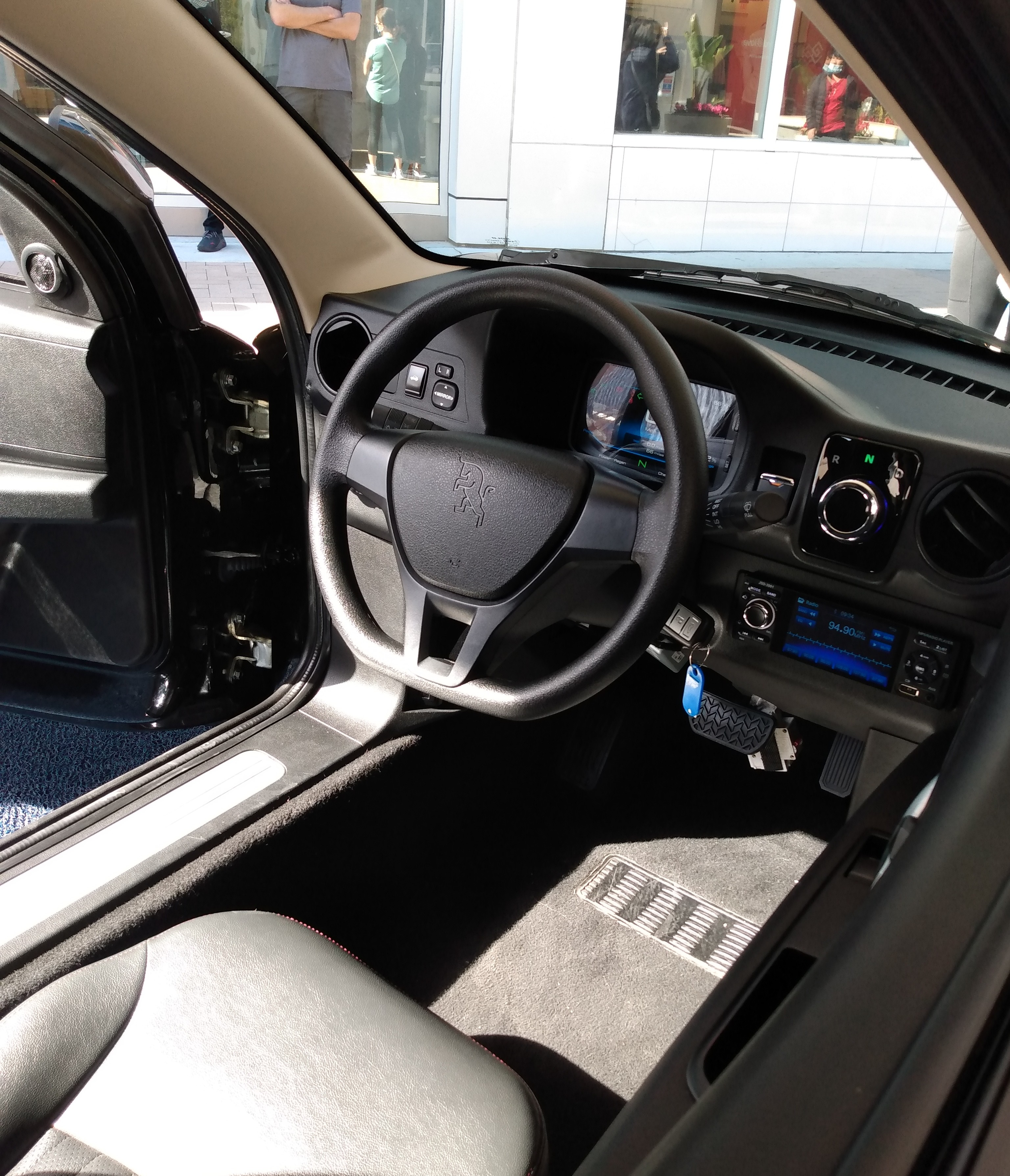
Interior of the ElectraMeccanica Solo

Initially, at the time ElectraMeccanica was founded in 2015, the concept of a three-wheeled small electric car was intended to take the form of implementing an existing project. Co-founder Jerry Kroll was then considering restoring the former American Myers Motors NmG model, to which he had purchased the rights, to production. Ultimately, this three-wheeled vehicle remained only a reference point for building a new, larger and more technologically advanced vehicle. Sketches of the finished design were officially presented in June 2016, and the production model was finally presented 3 months later.

The Solo took the form of a three-wheeler with one pair of doors and a slim body that tapered towards the rear unicycle. Similarly to the original by Mike Corbin from 1996, the Solo was designed to transport only one person, the driver. Behind the driver there is space for a 285-litre trunk. In 2022, a Cargo variant with an enlarged storage compartment was also offered.

On March 26, 2024, Electrameccanica was acquired by California-based commercial electric truck startup Xos, Inc.

== Sale ==
Production of the Solo initially began at ElectraMeccanica's Canadian factory in New Westminster, initially for the domestic market, with the first delivery to a customer in Vancouver. In 2021, production was moved to China as part of a partnership with the local company Zongshen from Chongqing to meet demand in the United States, where exports began 3 years after the first units were built. In 2022, production was to be moved again, this time to newly established plants in Mesa, Arizona, but the production line in Mesa was never completed. After 5 years of small-scale production, the new management team of the Canadian startup, which in the meantime had been entirely transferred to the United States, changed its policy and ended the production of Solo. The company offered to buy vehicles from buyers, responding to previously reported defects that could become difficult to service over time.

== Solo Automotive Inc. ==
On February 28, 2024, Solo Automotive Inc., of Vancouver, Canada, wholly owned by Jerry Kroll, acquired all of the Solo assets, including Industrial Design, Trademarks, and Patents.

The company plans to enter the European and UK markets with a more advanced model called the SoloGT, which will be manufactured at a plant in Spain. The first vehicles will go on sale in early 2025, and reservations with a $200 refundable deposit will be available soon on the new SoloEV website.

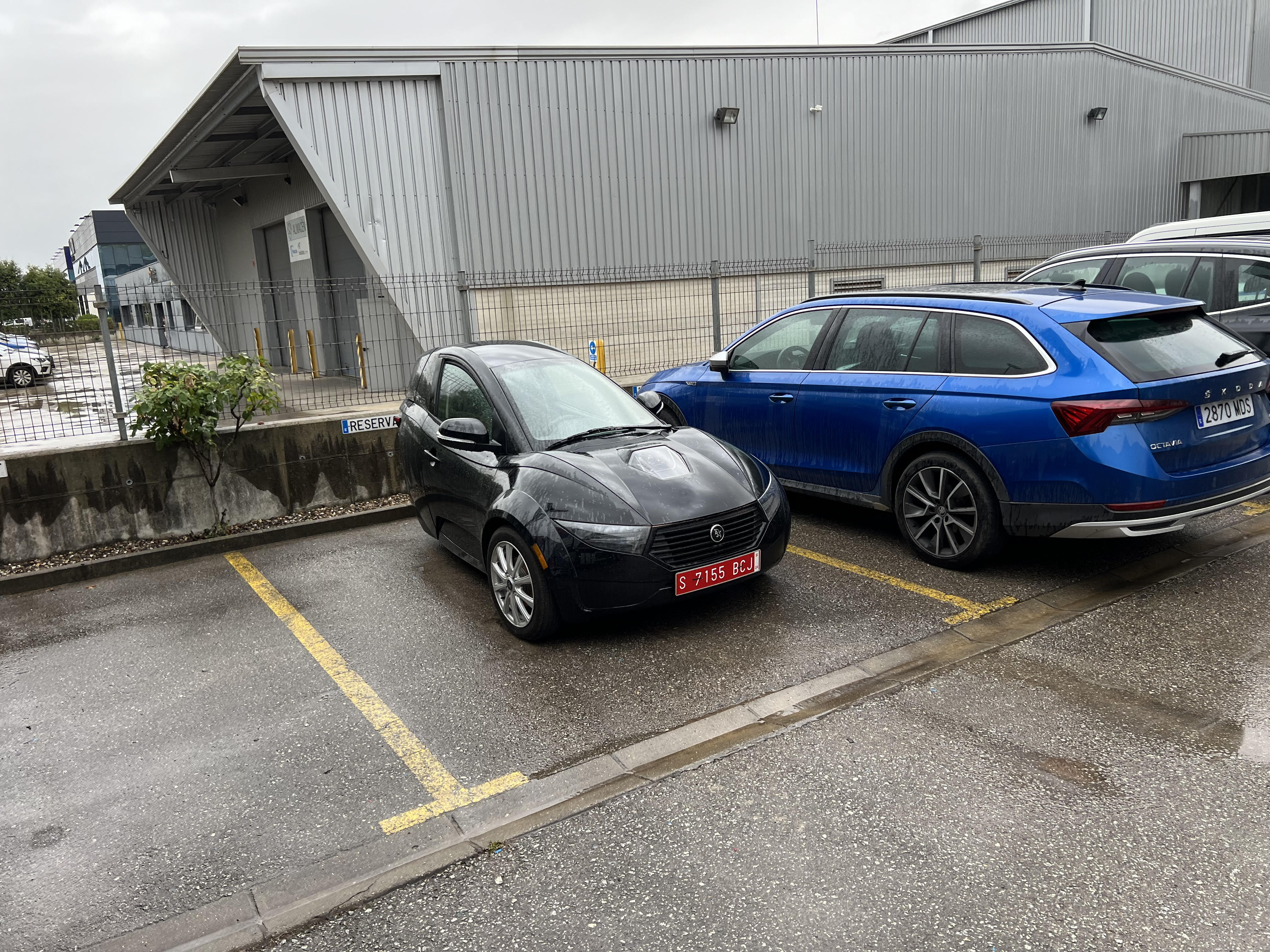
The first Solo registered in Spain

== See also ==
- Electric motorcycles and scooters
- Electric vehicle
