= American Tri-Car =

Defunct American motor vehicle manufacturer

The American Tri-Car was an American automobile made by the Tri-Car Co of America in Denver, Colorado, in 1912. It was a three-wheeler, with the one rear wheel being both the drive wheel and the only braked wheel. It was powered by a 13 hp, air-cooled 2-cylinder engine and used a planetary transmission. It seated two and had a wheelbase of 6 feet 10 inches (2.08 m). The company failed by the end of the year.
