= La Va Bon Train =

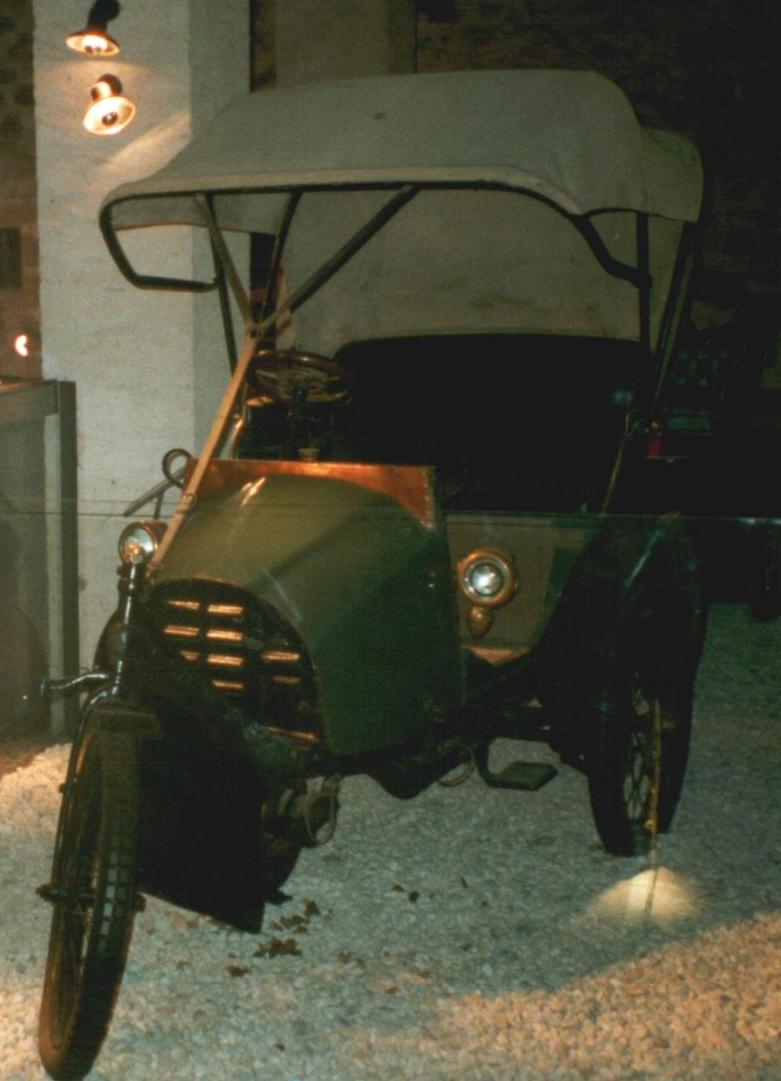
1904 Va Bon Train

The La Va Bon Train ("goes like blazes" in French) was a French automobile manufactured by Larroumet and Lagarde of Agen, Lot-et-Garonne, between 1904 and 1914. The company had originally been founded in 1891 as a bicycle maker.

The two-seater, three-wheeler featured an iron chassis, wheel steering, and a single-cylinder 6 hp engine of either their own make or at extra cost from De Dion. A two-speed epicyclic gearbox was fitted to early cars, but later ones used a more conventional unit, and final drive was by a choice of belt or chain. A differential was fitted from 1907.

Between 50 and 100 are believed to have been built, with the last ones made around 1910 but possibly still on sale as late as 1914.
