= Hoffmann (automobile) =

German three-wheeled automobile

1951 Hoffmann
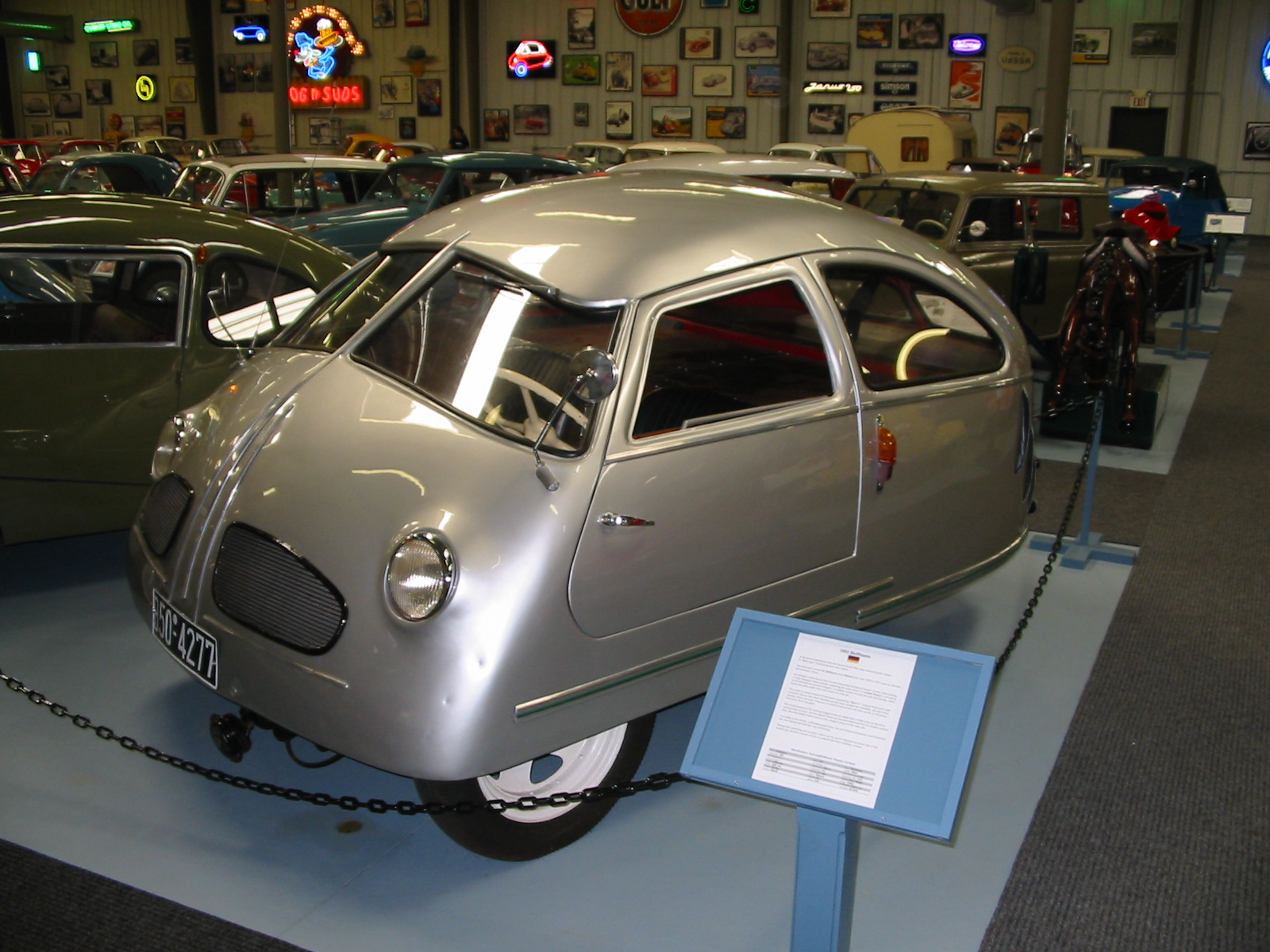
- 1951 Hoffmann

Overview
- Manufacturer: Hoffmann
- Production: September 1951
- Model years: 1951

Body and chassis
- Class: Indeterminate
- Body style: 2-door
- Layout: Engine mounted on rear wheel which steers

Powertrain
- Engine: Air-cooled 200 cc (12 cu in) ILO single-cylinder 2-stroke 4.8 kW (6.5 hp)
- Transmission: 3-speed manual

The 1951 Hoffmann is a three-wheeled car created by Michael Hoffmann, a shop foreman from Munich.

Only one Hoffmann was ever made; it is currently part of the collection at the Lane Motor Museum in Nashville, Tennessee, USA.

The gear shift sequence

== Design ==
The car is notable for its plethora of unconventional and often user-hostile design elements. These include:

- Windows that are raised or lowered with a strap that the user pulls, and held in place with eyelets and pegs
- Suicide doors and a driving position that make ingress and egress extremely difficult
- A starter awkwardly placed by the driver's right hip
- A fuel filler tube which goes from the roof, directly through the cabin of the car
- Front wheels that are farther apart than the length of the wheelbase
- A linear rather than H-shaped shift pattern with a neutral between each gear
- The rear wheel is placed immediately behind the driver, with a large portion of the car behind it
- Rear-wheel steering
- The combination of the previous two features mean that the car has an extremely high tendency to slew.
- An engine located on the same pivot as the rear wheel steering mechanism, so that the engine moves with the wheel when the car is steered
- Rearview mirrors positioned so that they are perfectly blocked by the A-pillar
- Two-stroke engine, which requires engine oil to be continuously mixed into the fuel supply
- Single-cylinder engine, which causes greater vibration than multi-cylinder engines
- Rear-mounted engine that is dependent on air cooling, but the lack of a fan causes overheating when idling
