= Girfalco Azkarra =

The Azkarra was a two-seat three-wheel all-electric concept car, and the first vehicle ever built by Canadian company Atelier Girfalco Limitée. The Azkarra concept was unveiled in December 2016.

Although production was initially set to begin in 2017 with first deliveries scheduled for spring 2017, the company was not successful in getting the car into production, and the company has been inactive since January 2024.

The Azkarra was featured during the Ball for the 75th Anniversary of the Montreal International Auto Show, held on October 12, 2017, at La Tohu.
