= TriVette =

American three-wheeled vehicle

The TriVette was an American three wheeled vehicle. It was designed and built in California by Bob Keyes from 1974 to 1978.

The TriVette was designed to meet all state and federal motorcycle standards, but was enclosed like a saloon car. The running gear was mostly derived from a Fiat 850 with a turbo Volkswagen motor as an option. The TriVette achieved over 61 MPG and, unlike most three-wheelers, was known for its handling.

Keyes also designed a larger V8 engined version, the Vigilante, which out accelerated and out handled most supercars of the time. Keyes died before the Vigilante reached full production.
