= Cree SAM =

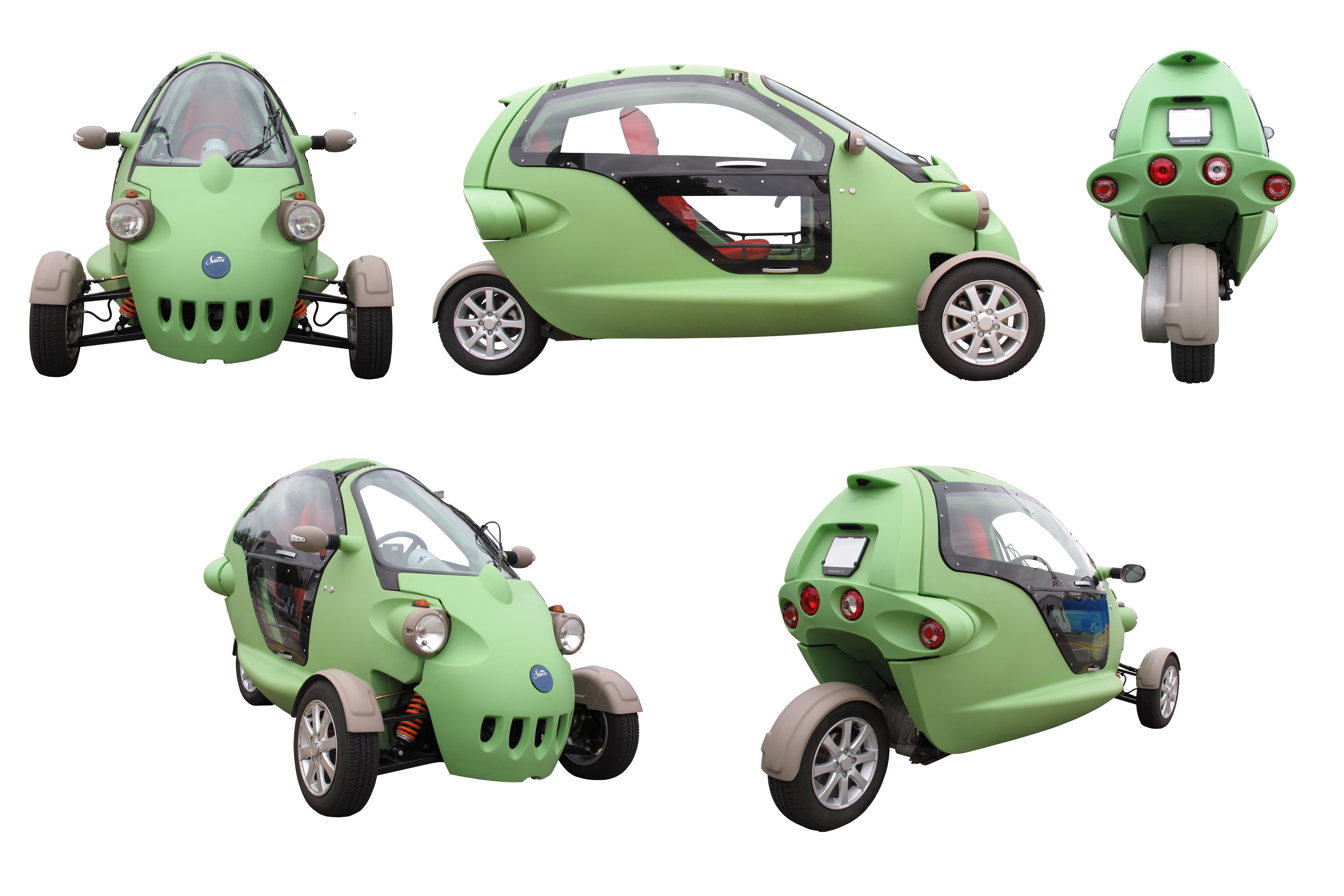
An image of the Cree SAM, showing multiple views of the vehicle.

The Cree SAM, designed and developed by the Swiss company Cree, is a prototype zero emission battery electric vehicle. It is a tadpole three-wheel car, with two seats in a tandem arrangement.

About 80 vehicles were produced for public testing in the Zurich and Basel area, in 2001 (SAM Electric Vehicle). In 2003 the company laid off all employees and applied for bankruptcy, but the shareholders, including the original designer Daniel Ryhiner, bought the company and kept it running, as an investment offer.

In 2009 a Polish company, Impact Automotive Technologies (IAT, Pruszkow), began production of a newer and faster version of the Cree SAM with a larger range, called the SAM RE-Volt. It was tested and received road certification in Italy.
