= XR-3 Hybrid =

The XR-3 Hybrid is a plug-in hybrid kit vehicle from Robert Q. Riley Enterprises.

The top speed is 80 mph (130 km/h) and fuel economy is 125 mpg_{‑US} (1.88 L/100 km; 150 mpg_{‑imp}) on diesel power only and 225 mpg_{‑US} (1.05 L/100 km; 270 mpg_{‑imp}) on combined diesel and electric power.

The vehicle body is FRP/foam composite.

The vehicle is built from plans, with parts sourced by the builder, although a kit with pre-assembled parts may be sold sometime in the future.

As of March 27, 2021, their official website is suspended. A member of Elio Owners Forum has reported that attempts to reach them on their facebook page were unsuccessful.

== Powertrain and range ==
The two front wheels are powered by the diesel or biodiesel internal combustion engine (ICE) and the single rear wheel is electric powered. The two power systems are ground-connected, meaning that they both drive wheels along the ground but are not connected at all within the vehicle, which allows owners to add and remove the diesel and electric propulsion systems separately and use either or both. With only a diesel engine and the vehicle's standard tank holding 3 US gallons (11 L; 2.5 imp gal), range is 400 miles (640 km), and with only an electric motor and full battery packs, range is 100 miles (160 km).

== Price ==
A duplicate of the Lithium-ion battery powered prototype will top $25,000, including $7,500 for batteries and an advanced DC 8-inch (200 mm) motor. Lead-acid batteries trim cost between $1,500 and $2,000. However, a diesel-only vehicle can be built for less than $10,000, and the modularity of the design allows an electric power train to be added easily later.

== Safety ==
The vehicle has a roll bar, seat belts, foam in the sides and front of the vehicle ranging from 5 to 10 inches (130–250 mm), and a horizontal steering column intended to be pushed away by a driver thrown forward by an accident without harming the driver, unlike a conventional car's steering column. It does not have airbags, large steel beam crumple zones, or an anti-lock braking system.
