= Automotive X Prize =

Progressive Insurance Automotive X PRIZE
- Awarded for: "design, build and race super-efficient vehicles that will achieve 100 MPGe (2.35 liter/100 kilometer) efficiency, produce less than 200 grams/mile well-to-wheel CO_{2} equivalent emissions, and could be manufactured for the mass market"
- Country: Worldwide
- Presented by: X PRIZE Foundation
- Reward: US$10 million (divided)
- First award: 2010
- Currently held by: Team Edison2, Team Li-Ion Motors, Team X-Tracer
- Website: xprize.org/prizes/auto

The Progressive Insurance Automotive X Prize (PIAXP or AXP) was a set of competitions, programs and events, from the X Prize Foundation, to "inspire a new generation of super-efficient vehicles that help break America's addiction to oil and stem the effects of climate change." Progressive Insurance was the title sponsor of the prize, the centerpiece of which is the Competition Division, within which a 10-million-dollar purse was divided between the winners of three competitions.

The essence of each competition was to design, build and race super-efficient vehicles that achieved 100 MPGe (2.35 liter/100 kilometer) efficiency, produced less than 200 grams/mile well-to-wheel CO_{2} equivalent emissions, and could be manufactured for the mass market. Within the Competition Division, there are two vehicle classes: Mainstream and Alternative. The mainstream class had a prize of $5 million. The alternate class had two separate prizes of $2.5 million, one for side-by-side seating and one for tandem seating.

The PIAXP has an educational program, funded by a $3.5 million grant from the United States Department of Energy, to engage students and the public in learning about advanced vehicle technologies, energy efficiency, climate change, alternative fuels, and the science, technology, engineering, and math behind efficient vehicle development.

== History ==
The X Prize Foundation began work on the development of a competition to spur innovation in the automotive industry in 2005 and on 6 March 2006 announced that Mark Goodstein would join the Foundation as an executive director of the new prize. A little more than year later, on 12 April 2007, the Foundation formally announced the creation of the prize at the 2007 New York Auto Show and set the purse at $10 million for a car that could get 100 mpg_{‑US} (2.4 L/100 km; 120 mpg_{‑imp}) and be sold for a reasonable price. In the subsequent year, the X Prize Foundation solidified sponsorship for the prize and on 20 March 2008 announced that Progressive Insurance would be the Title Sponsor of the Prize and fund the $10 million purse. From that point onward, it was known as the Progressive Insurance Automotive X Prize (PIAXP).

At the 12 April 2007 announcement of the creation of the X Prize, the Foundation released draft Competition Guidelines, which were open for public comment from 2 April to 31 May 2007. The latest guidelines were published on 10 January 2009. The competition guidelines are the product of hundreds of volunteers of the AXP and world-class advisors.

On 7 April 2009, the X Prize Foundation announced that 111 teams had registered by the February 2009 deadline. By 20 October 2009, the design judging had winnowed the number of teams down to 43, with some publicly, and others quietly, withdrawing. The formal vehicle competition events began on 26 April 2010, and consisted of the remaining four stages: Shakedown (26 April – 7 May 2010), Knockout ( 16–30 June 2010), Finals ( 19–30 July 2010) and Validation (August 2010).

=== Winners ===
The winners of the competition were announced on 16 September 2010.

- Team Edison2 won the $5 million Mainstream competition with its four-passenger Very Light Car, obtaining 102.5 Mpge or just below 69 MPG running on E85 fuel.
- Team Li-Ion Motors won the $2.5 million Alternative Side-by-Side competition with their aerodynamic Wave-II electric vehicle achieving 187 MPGe.
- Team X-Tracer Switzerland won the $2.5 million Alternative Tandem competition with their 205.3 MPGe faired electric motorcycle.

== Vehicle requirements ==
Within the competition division, there are two vehicle classes—mainstream and alternative—both of which have the same requirements for fuel economy and emissions, but differing design constraints. The Alternative class is further divided into tandem and side-by-side classes. Vehicles in the Mainstream Class must meet specifications that are derived from typical small, five-passenger, economy mixed-use vehicles. The Alternative Class has fewer performance and design restrictions and provides an outlet for innovation. Both classes allow entries that are modifications of an existing popular vehicle, provided that all PIAXP requirements are met.

Vehicles in both classes must have a fuel economy of 100 MPGe (21 kWh or 2.35 liters of petrol/100 kilometer) and produce less than 200 grams/mile CO_{2} emissions (measured well-to-wheel). For electric vehicles, the CO_{2} emissions requirement is a more binding constraint. Because CO_{2} emissions will be calculated assuming a national average of electricity sources projected to 2014, an all-electric car will have to achieve 114 MPGe in order to produce less than 200 grams/mile CO_{2} emissions. Further, electricity consumption is measured at the "plug" side of the battery charging device, so it would have to achieve 114 MPGe, assuming 100% efficient battery charging. If the charger were 85% efficient, this requirement would grow to 134 MPGe. In the other words, efficiency of electric cars should be not 21 but 16 kWh/100 km.

Vehicles in both classes also must have features expected of a modern automobile including an enclosed cabin with windshield and windows, operating windshield wipers, washers, headlights, horn, indicators, brake lights, reflective devices, rear and side-view mirrors, and seat belts. They must have the usual automotive controls, including accelerator pedal, brake pedal, steering mechanism (not necessarily a wheel) and indicators. They must be "highway capable", which is defined as the ability to maintain 65 mph (105 km/h) on a four percent uphill grade and to accelerate from 40 mph (64 km/h) to 60 mph (97 km/h) in less than 9 seconds. They must be able to brake from 60 to 0 mph in less than 170 feet (52 m), meet existing noise standards and use tires that meet automotive or motorcycle (alternative class only and only if the vehicle is otherwise eligible to be classified as a motorcycle) standards. Both must meet the same set of static and dynamic stability requirements.

The mainstream vehicle must seat at least four adults with at least two side-by-side front seats, have at least 10 cubic feet (0.28 m^{3}) of useful cargo space in one contiguous location not counting the passenger seats, accelerate from 0 to 60 mph (97 km/h) in 15 seconds or less, and be able to drive 200 miles (320 km) without refueling or recharging. The mainstream vehicle must have four or more wheels.

The alternate class vehicle must seat at least two people, accelerate from 0 to 60 mph (97 km/h) in 18 seconds or less, and be able to drive 100 miles (160 km) without refueling or recharging. The alternative vehicle has no minimum number of wheels, but it must remain upright when stopped with no driver inputs.

While the main focus of PIAXP is fuel economy and carbon emissions, not safety, the vehicles must be "production capable". Therefore, the entries must either be fully compliant with the Federal Motor Vehicle Safety Standards (FMVSS) and other applicable National Highway Traffic Safety Administration (NHTSA) requirements or compliance has to be "designed in". For example, allowance for airbags in the designs is considered acceptable without actually installing the airbags. Teams are also required to submit a business plan which clearly demonstrates an ability to produce 10,000 vehicles per year. Note that teams are not required to be under-taking this plan, but the plan has to exist and the car has to be designed such that this plan is feasible.

With the lack of mainstream entrants from established automobile companies, a Demonstration Division was created so that automakers could at least display and promote their highest efficiency vehicles alongside the main competition. However, there were too few entrants by 1 March registration deadline, and this division was canceled. The only confirmed entrant was the Tesla Roadster, which had dropped out of the main competition.

Vehicles in the demonstration division would have met the same requirements as mainstream class vehicles in the competition division, except for MPGe and CO_{2} emissions. There was no alternative class equivalent in the demonstration division. These vehicles would have been stock vehicles, i.e., vehicles identical to those for sale or pre-production prototypes of vehicles intended for sales.

Vehicles in the demonstration division would have been tested in the same way as competition division vehicles and would have participated in the PIAXP competition events under the same rules in order to demonstrate and showcase their capabilities and performance.

== Competition events ==
The competition timeline was finalized as follows:

=== Design judging ===
Accepted teams must provide evidence that their vehicles are production capable, by providing a detailed Data Submissions covering four areas:

- Safety and emissions: Vehicles must be designed so that, in production, they meet U.S. safety standards (FMVSS) and U.S. emission standards.
- Manufacturability and cost: Vehicles must be capable of being manufactured in quantities of 10,000 per year with production costs within levels consistent with that production volume.
- Features: Vehicles must have the features expected by consumers for vehicles within the projected prices range.
- Business plan: There must be a credible plan to manufacture, sell and support 10,000 vehicles (or conversions) per year by 2014. The plan must address required fuel infrastructure if it does not already exist.

Those that pass this hurdle will be invited to bring their vehicles to the competition events. The design judging was closed in October 2009, with 43 teams remaining.

=== Shakedown stages ===
The first three stages are intended to be a "shake-down" period and performance in these stages do not count to final scores. The first step of the competition is the review of technical reports, technical inspection of the vehicles and performance testing of safety elements to eliminate unsafe vehicles. The two-week shakedown took place at the Michigan International Speedway, from 26 April to 7 May 2010.

Those that pass the initial technical and safety inspections and tests will participate in the remaining competition events. These include stage races, additional active safety performance tests and a dynamometer test.

=== Knockout stage ===
The next stage is a "knockout" qualifying event. To advance, vehicles must pass active safety performance tests, meet acceptable emission levels and demonstrate at least 67 MPGe on a test track. These were held at the Michigan International Speedway from 20 to 29 June 2010. After this stage, only 15 vehicles from 12 teams remained in the competition.

=== Finals stage ===
The winning teams were determined in the final stage. To successfully complete the race, the vehicles had to maintain a minimum average speed (maximum time allowed) while meeting the PIAXP requirements for fuel consumption (90 MPGe) and emissions. The requirement was that the vehicle with the best overall time that met the requirements would win the final race. The final round took place from 19 to 30 July 2010 at the Michigan International Speedway. As only Edison2 remained in the mainstream class and only X-Tracer in the tandem class, no more runs took place there. Only in the side-by-side class was there a final race and the last five competitors were pitted against each other. Aptera dropped out due to technical problems and ZAP ran out of battery. Only Raceabout, LiIon-Motors and TW4XP (TWIKE4) crossed the finish line in the final race. After deducting penalty points, LiIon Motors was awarded the win in the side-by-side class.

=== Validation stage ===
The few remaining teams were validated on dynamometers under laboratory conditions at the EPA Labs in Ann Arbor, Michigan and Argonne National Laboratory in Chicago, Illinois. This stage is scheduled for August 2010. The validation results count toward 50% of the final efficiency figures, which together must exceed 100 MPGe.

Edison2 was an exception. The engines in both Very Light Cars failed before validation. Edison2 was allowed to circumvent the rules governing procedures and provided independent third-party validation reports instead of undergoing the same validation testing as other finalist teams.

== Educational program ==
The United States Department of Energy joined the PIAXP as a sponsor, funding an educational program targeted to young people. The first component of the Education Program is a web site created in partnership with Discovery Education, www.FuelOurFutureNow.com, featuring activities for K-12 students, as well as videos, virtual labs, and interactive resources intended for use in school and in the home.

== Competing teams ==
Although 111 teams registered for the PAIXP and paid the registration fee, by 20 October 2009, the number of teams had decreased to 43, sponsoring 53 vehicles between them. These remaining teams represented 10 countries (some entries listed two countries of origin) with 28 coming from the United States and 7 from the state of California. Of the 53 vehicles, 28 were in the Alternative Classes and 25 in the Mainstream Class. By 15 April, only 30 teams remained. After the shakedown completed in May, 22 teams remained. A sample of the teams is shown below.

=== Mainstream ===
- American HyPower – The "Zams" is a modified 2009 Toyota Prius. The all volunteer team based in Centennial, CO is composed of aerospace, electrical, and chemical engineers as well as entrepreneurs. It focuses on improving fuel efficiency through the introduction of hydrogen and a proprietary fuel augmentation device. In addition, aerodynamic modifications were made to the stock vehicle which alone, significantly improve fuel efficiency.
- BITW Technologies- Demonstrated the use of Bio-Diesel as a renewable resource and curb our use of petroleum from other countries.
- Edison2 – Developers of the Very Light Car, this Lynchburg, Va team of experts from auto endurance racing emphasize low weight and low aerodynamic drag as the key to automotive efficiency, and are entered in both alternative classes and the mainstream class.
- Engineer – Entered the "Hybrid Steam Vehicle"
- Global E – Entered two vehicles: the "Pulse" is a four-seat hatchback electric vehicle and the "G1" is a hybrid electric vehicle entered into the "alternate:side-by-side" category.
- Illuminati Motor Works – The Seven is an electric vehicle with a custom designed aerodynamic body, designed by a group of volunteers from Illinois.
- Liberty Motors Group – "The Liberator" is a modified 2008 Hyundai Sonata.
- Team FourSight – The "FourSight" is a modified Honda Insight converted to a diesel hybrid.
- West Philly Hybrid X – The "EVX Focus" is a modified Ford Focus

=== Alternative (Side by Side) ===
- amp – amp'd Sky, an electric conversion of a Saturn Sky

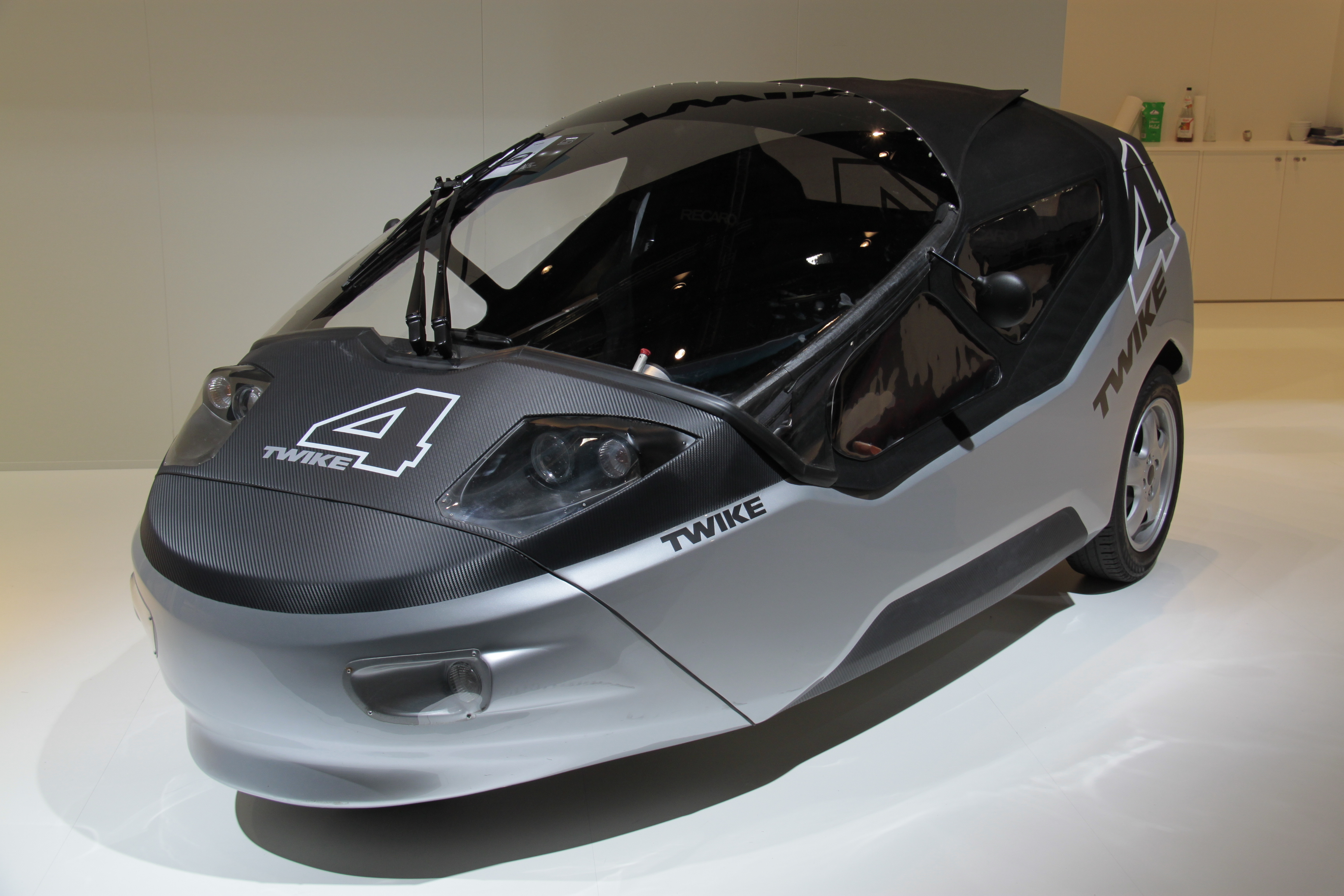
Twike 4 under the name TW4XP (‘Threewheeler for X Prize’) took third place in 2010.

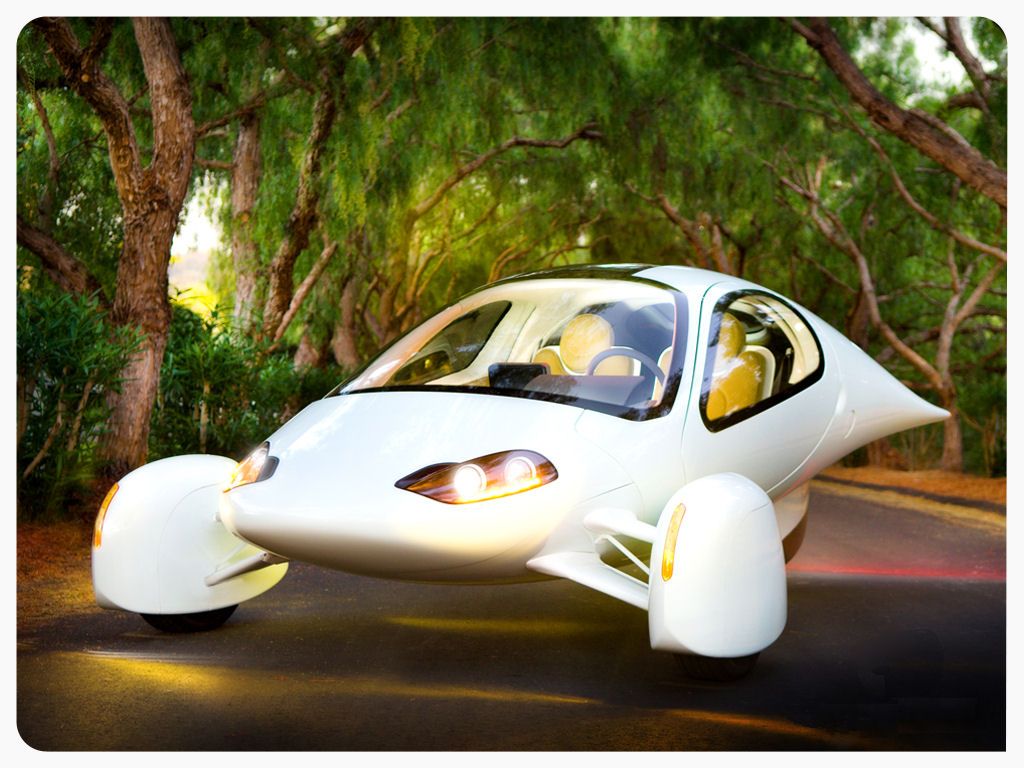
Aptera Motors' high-efficiency passenger vehicle was a contender in the X-Prize competition.

- Aptera Motors – This company was founded by Steve Fambro and Chris Anthony. They developed a three-wheeled vehicle, the Aptera 2 Series. The initial model was to be all electric, but eventually prototyped as a plug-in hybrid version. The shape of the car is credited to Jason Hill, a designer who worked on the body of the Porsche Carrera GT, and to Aptera's own aerodynamicist, Miles Wheeler. The design was inspired by modern composite aircraft and is legally classified as a motorcycle.
- Li-ion Motors – The Wave II is a battery electric vehicle with a custom battery management system and an aerodynamic composite fairing.
- Optamotive – E-Rex, an electric conversion of the Campagna T-Rex
- Raceabout – A custom designed electric sports car from Helsinki Polytechnic in Helsinki, Finland.
- SABA Motors – The company was founded by Simon Saba, and is headquartered in San Jose, California. The SABA Carbon Zero Roadster is a four-wheeled, all-electric, two-passenger automobile, which weighs 1,900 lbs. The vehicle's battery pack contains 112 cells, and utilizes Lithium iron phosphate chemistry. The company claims performance of 0–60 in under five seconds, a top speed of 105 mph, and a range of up to 140 miles.
- Tata Motors – Tata Indica Vista EV X. Tata plans to sell this model in India in 2011.
- Team EVX – an electric conversion of the Smart Car
- TW4XP – a human-electric hybrid derived from the Twike
- West Philadelphia High School – The only high school entrant is fielding two hybrid vehicle conversions: a Ford Focus (gas PHEV) and a Factory Five Racing GTM (biodiesel HEV).
- Western Washington University – Of more than five dozen entrants in the competition this is only one of three university-based teams. They are based at WWU's Bellingham, Washington campus. Their group of students at Western's Vehicle Research Institute have what's been described by Automobile Magazine as having "very possibly the best school in the country for total car design."
- ZAP – The American/Chinese company have developed a three-wheeled vehicle, the ZAP Alias, a 100% plug-in electric roadster, announced by the company to be produced in China by Jonway Automobile Co. Ltd. Aerodynamic contours shape, wide stance with double-wishbone suspension, an AC24LS, air-cooled, AC induction motor running at 216 volts.

=== Alternative (Tandem) ===
- Commuter Cars – A production vehicle from this company has been sold to actor George Clooney. The car, a Commuter Cars Tango, is known for its ultra-narrow profile. The Tango's narrow track is offset by its low center of gravity. The battery pack that supplies power for this all electric vehicle weighs in at 1,100 lb (500 kg) and is placed low in the vehicle. The car is high performance. It accelerates to 60 miles per hour in four seconds and will reach a top speed of 150 mph (240 km/h).
- Future Vehicle Technologies – This Canadian company has developed the eVaro, a two-person in-line three-wheeled series-hybrid vehicle which was recently certified to have a mileage of 275 MPGe in city driving and 165 MPGe in freeway driving.
- Spira4u – This lightweight two-seater has a soft foam fairing designed primarily for safety and efficiency.
- X-Tracer Team Switzerland – An aerodynamically faired electric feet forwards motorcycle with outrigger wheels which deploy when stopped and retract at speed.

== See also ==
- List of motor vehicle awards
- Ansari X Prize
- Electric vehicle
- Fuel efficiency
- PACE Award
- Plug-in hybrid
