= Aptera Motors =

American solar electric vehicle startup

Aptera Motors Corp.
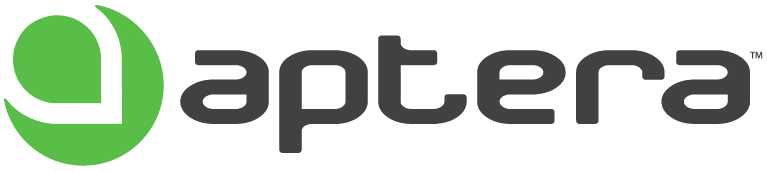

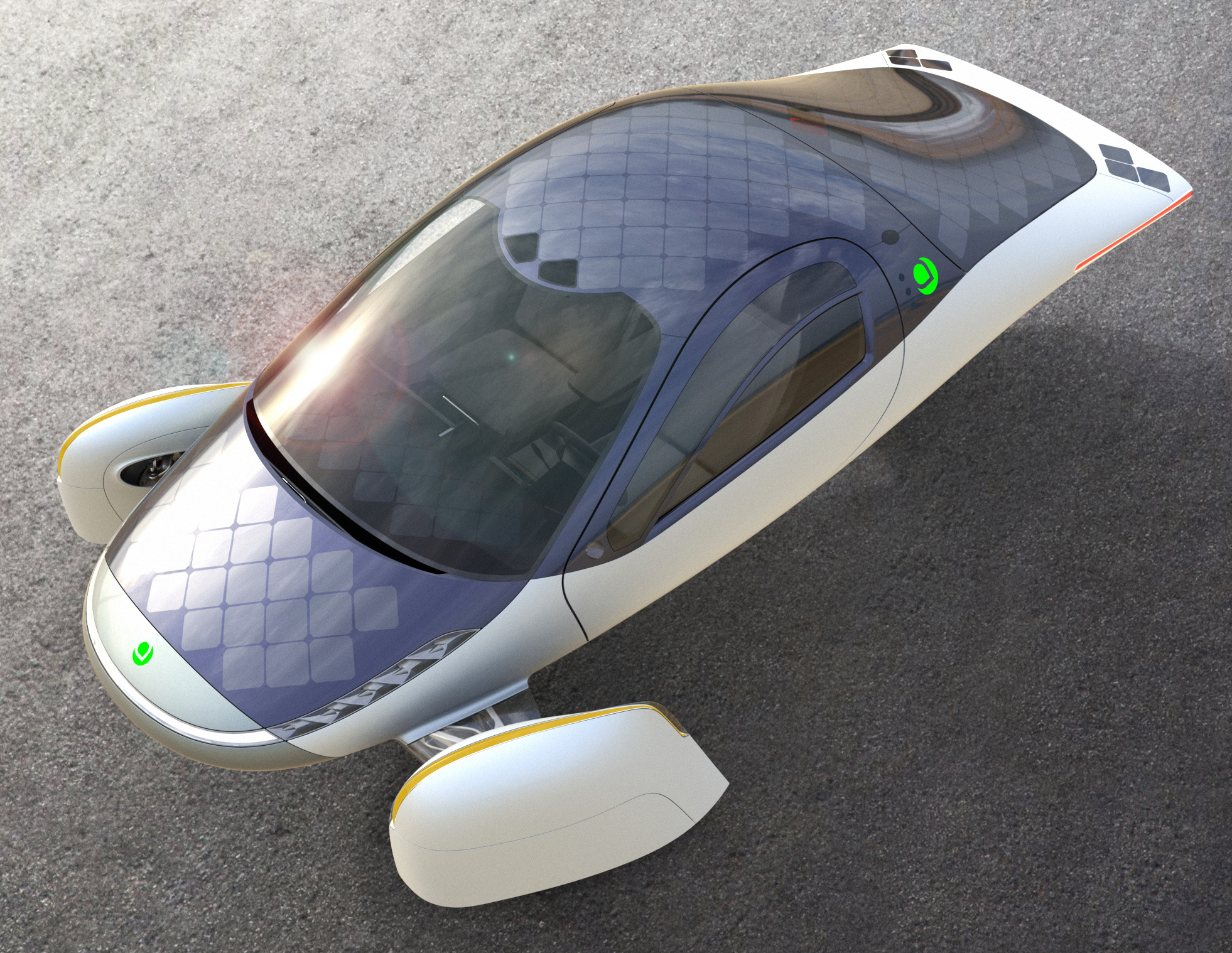
- Type: Public
- Traded as: Nasdaq: SEV
- Industry: Automotive
- Founded: 2006, liquidated 2011; 2012, went silent 2014; 2019
- Founders: Steven P. Fambro (Co-CEO); Chris L. Anthony (Co-CEO); Michael Johnson
- Headquarters: Carlsbad, California, United States
- Area served: California (upon initial production)
- Key people: Jason Hill (Design); Nathan Armstrong (CTO)
- Products: electric three-wheeler
- Net income: ▼ (loss) $43.9 million (2025); ▲ (loss) $34.9 million (2024); ▲ (loss) $59.2 million (2023); ▼ (loss) $61.5 million (2022)
- Total assets: ▼$34.9 million (2024); ▼$37.6 million (2023); ▲$39.9 million (2022)
- Number of employees: 57 (2026)
- Website: aptera.us

Aptera Motors Corp. is a company developing an energy efficient electric two-seat three-wheeler solar electric vehicle. The company is based in Carlsbad, California. It was founded in 2019 and became publicly traded in 2025.

An earlier company, Aptera Motors Inc., was founded in 2006 but liquidated in 2011 after failing to get enough funding to start production of similar vehicles. The Zhejiang Jonway Group bought the intellectual property of Aptera Motors Inc. in 2012 and operated under the names Zaptera USA and Aptera USA, but ceased operations by 2014 without producing any vehicles.

The third iteration, Aptera Motors Corp., was founded in 2019, raised $140 million by April 2025, and another $17M by March 2026. The company ended 2025 with $10M in cash and an annual net loss of $44M. The company stated in its March 2026 financial filing that its low-scale production line will start at the earliest in March 2027, pending raising a further $50 million. In June 2026, a company representative said they're targeting deliveries before the end of the year.

== Business activity ==
=== Aptera Motors Inc. (2006) ===
Aptera was founded as Accelerated Composites in 2006 by Steve Fambro, who formerly worked at Illumina. Fambro hired Chris Anthony as COO shortly after founding the company. The company name was later changed to Aptera Motors, referencing the Greek word "aptera" (άπτερα) which the company interprets as "wingless flight." In 2006, the company announced it had a three-wheeled car design, classified as a motorcycle, that would get an estimated 330 miles per US gallon (0.71 L/100 km) at 65 mph (105 km/h). Aptera Motors hired several industry veterans in 2008 to oversee engineering and production as well as marketing. The company raised $24 million from Google and Idealab, and announced plans to bring its car to market by the end of 2008.

Near the end of 2008, the company hired Paul Wilbur as CEO and announced that the launch of the vehicle, called "typ-1" or "2e", would be delayed until 2009. The company's new leadership purported potential customers regarded the existing design as impractical, indicating fixed door windows as example; implementing roll-down windows would require redesigning the car's structural shell. Approximately 4,000 people signed up as potential customers for a planned California-only launch. Aptera founders Fambro and Anthony contributed less to the operations of the company, though they remained on the board of directors. Fambro was assigned to Aptera's advanced concepts group, while Anthony spent less time at Aptera, acting as CEO for another company developing battery management systems.

Aptera applied for a loan from the Department of Energy under the Advanced Technology Vehicles Manufacturing Loan Program. The application was rejected in December 2008, because three-wheelers such as the one made by Aptera were not defined as "cars" which were required to be four-wheeled. Aptera successfully lobbied to change the regulations, and reapplied for a $184 million loan in January 2010. The department's sales projections for the Aptera 2e showed it would not enable Aptera to repay its loan. Aptera shifted all its development efforts in January 2011 to a mid-sized four-wheeled four-door sedan, dubbed the 4e. Aptera Motors started to return deposits from customers on August 12, 2011. At the time, the company reported 60,000 people had expressed interest in buying the 2e vehicle, and 2,000 of them had paid a $500 deposit.

The Department of Energy issued a conditional commitment letter for $150 million of loans for Aptera, pending the company raising of $80 million privately. When the DoE declined a loan application for a similarly plastic-bodied car by a different company in November 2011, Aptera investors refused to grant it further funds. In December 2011, the company announced that it could not raise the funds required to continue operating. The company was sold and liquidated in December 2011, after starting to return customer deposits in August. By December the majority of the deposits had been returned according to Aptera, though some depositors reported difficulty contacting Aptera or its liquidators.

=== Aptera USA (2012) ===
In April 2012, the Chinese automaker Zhejiang Jonway Group purchased the intellectual property of Aptera Motors from creditors, and in May, it announced that it would start manufacturing the 2e at its factory in Shanghai and intended to ship chassis to a small assembly plant, initially employing 15-20 people, that it would set up in Santa Rosa, with sales commencing in early 2013. Jonway was a major investor in Zap Jonway, which had been working on electric cars in Santa Rosa since the mid-1990s. The company planned to name the US company "Zaptera USA" and it displayed a prototype 2e next to a Zap Jonway car at the Beijing Motor Show. However, the close association with Zap was met with protest by electric-car enthusiasts and by May, the company said it would call the company Aptera USA and keep it independent of Zap Jonway. The company stated it would manufacture 5000 vehicles by the end of 2012.

In June 2013, Zaptera USA said it would split into two companies: the existing Jonway-owned Zaptera USA, and an independent Aptera USA; Zaptera would make the all-electric 2e and Aptera would make a gasoline-powered version called the 2g. The companies as of June 2013 were still planning on releasing vehicles in early 2014, but provided no further updates by May 2014 and did not manufacture any vehicles by 2019.

=== Aptera Motors Corp. (2019) ===
The company was relaunched in 2019 as Aptera Motors Corp. by the original Aptera founders, Chris Anthony and Steve Fambro. The company planned on using a crowdfunding campaign to restart development of the vehicle. On December 8, 2020, the company presented a driveable prototype and started accepting reservations. By December 14 the company had over 3000 refundable preorders for $100 each.

Multiple solar panel, motor, and battery configurations were planned, with estimated ranges from 250 to 1,000 miles (400 to 1,610 km), and initial estimated prices from $25,900 to over $47,000. The 400-mile (640 km) model, initially priced at $29,800, was priced by Aptera in 2025 at $40,000 for the front-wheel drive option which the company planned as of 2023 to be the only available model on release.

Aptera planned delivering production units of the Aptera vehicle in 2021, and projected sales of the first 314 vehicles at a loss with a cost of goods of about $6 million and operating expenses of about $15 million. Aptera projected sales of 4,287 vehicles at a profit of $38 million the following year, with a cost of goods of about $92 million and about $16 million in operating expenses. By October 2021 Aptera had raised $28 million. By February 2022, most planned deliveries were pushed from 2022 to 2023 and 2024.

Aptera released its 2021 annual report in May 2022, stating they had 103 employees and over 18,000 reservations for their solar electric vehicle. By mid 2022, the company raised a total of $40 million, planning to get to production by the end of the year. They acquired three buildings in Carlsbad, California, with a combined space of over 100,000 sq ft (9,300 m^{2}). In November 2022 Aptera announced they have redesigned the structural components of the vehicle, and it requires more funding before they can get to production.

In January 2023 the company announced a fund drive to raise $50 million, saying they needed at least that amount to start production. The company announced in February that the funds would allow for the "initial phases of production", and the following month said it requires additional funds to produce and deliver vehicles to customers. Aptera Motors' stated in their 2022 annual report released in May 2023 that the company then had 55 full-time employees. They reported $39.9 million in total assets and an operating loss of $61.5 million.

Zaptera, which purchased the intellectual property of Aptera Motors Inc. in 2012, sued Aptera Motors Corp. in 2024 over various alleged intellectual property infringements. Some of the allegations relating to trade secrets were dismissed with prejudice in 2025. The lawsuit was mutually dismissed with prejudice in April 2026 as Aptera agreed to issue Zaptera 105,000 shares and 210,000 share warrants.

Aptera stated in June 2024 that they have finalized the design of the vehicle in late 2023. Aptera announced in July 2024 that they have replaced the hub motor design of the drivetrain with a Vitesco Technologies axle drive motor design. The company demonstrated its production-intent PI2 model in October 2024. Electric vehicle startup Telo Trucks partnered with Aptera in January 2025 to offer solar panels as an option for its compact MT1 pickup truck.

Aptera announced in April 2025 the company raised a total of $130 million through crowdfunding and $10 million from other investors, and the company requires an additional $60 million before it can start low-volume production, with deliveries planned for late 2025. The company planned as of April 2025 for initial sales in 2026 and full-scale production in 2028. The company announced in October 2025 it had secured a $75 million equity line of credit and had transitioned to a Public Benefit Corporation trading on Nasdaq under the symbol SEV.

Aptera stated in its March 2026 financial filings that it has raised a further $17M, and plans starting low-scale production no earlier than March 2027 pending raising a further $50 million. A company representative mentioned in June 2026 the company is targeting vehicle deliveries to customers by the end of 2026.

== Prototypes ==
=== Aptera Mk-0 and Mk-1/Typ-1 ===
Aptera Mk-1
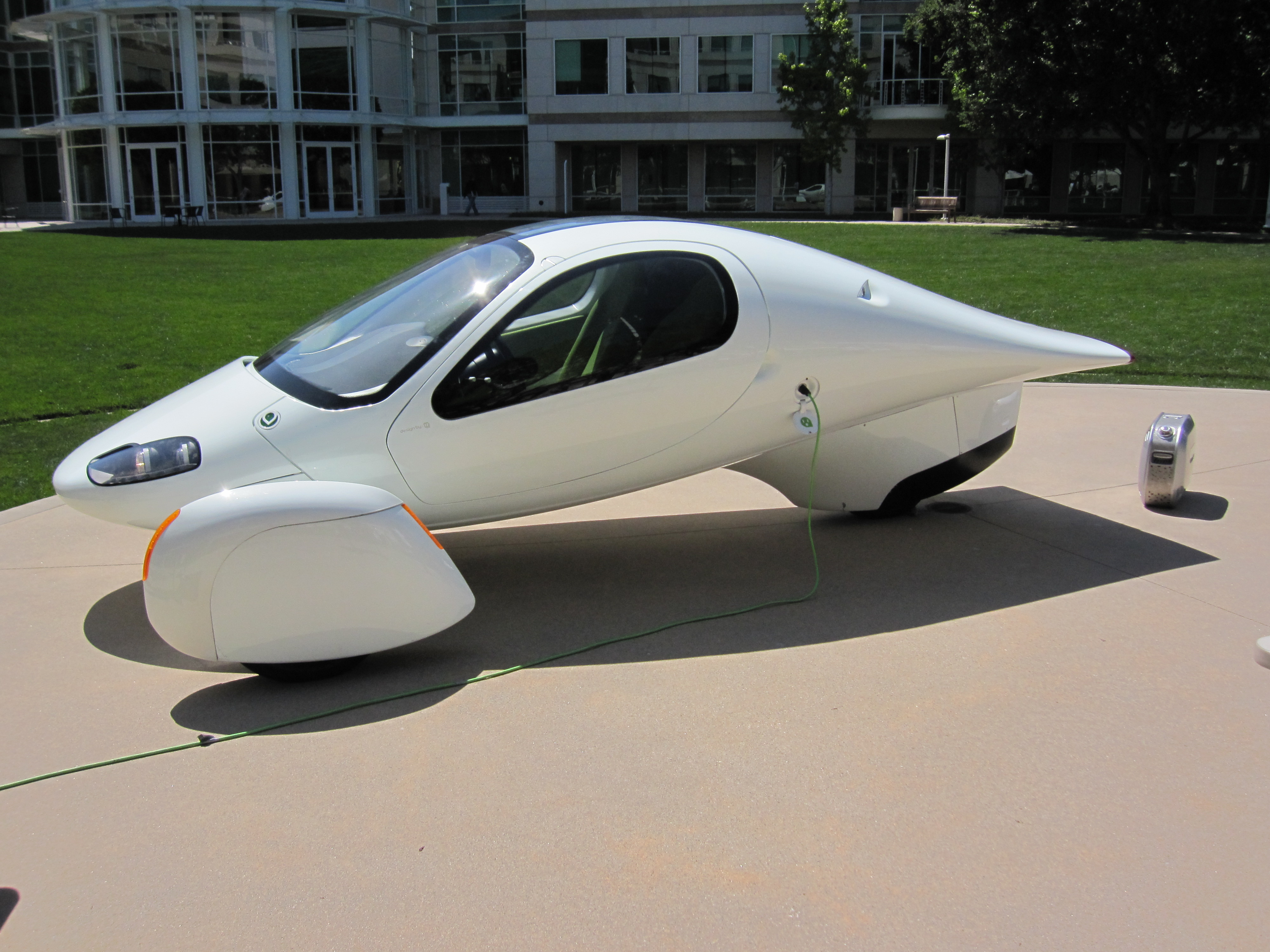

Overview
- Assembly: United States

Body and chassis
- Class: Subcompact
- Body style: 2-door three-wheeled car

Powertrain
- Engine: Diesel: 9 kW (12 hp); Electric: 19 kW (25 hp)
- Transmission: CVT

Dimensions
- Wheelbase: 1,625 mm (64 in)
- Length: 4,394 mm (173 in)
- Curb weight: 386 kg (851 lb)

The 2006 Aptera Motors Inc. vehicle design underwent several design revisions. The first two prototypes, Aptera Mk-0 and Mk-1, were concept cars for attracting investor funds, rather than production intent vehicles. The third vehicle, the Aptera 2e, was intended for production, but the required funding was not achieved.

The introductory press release stated its design would achieve 330 mpg_{‑US} (0.71 L/100 km; 400 mpg_{‑imp}), and included computer renderings of the vehicle. The body shape was estimated to have a drag coefficient of Cd=0.055 to 0.06, and would have sported a 12 hp (9 kW) diesel engine and a 24 hp (18 kW) permanent magnet DC motor. The design also called for a CVT and ultracapacitors, and would sell for under US$20,000 as of 2006.

In September 2007, the Aptera Motors website was updated with the Aptera design dubbed the Aptera Typ-1, and the Mk-1 pre-production prototype. It was redesigned from the Mk-0 prototype by Jason Hill, who worked on the Smart Fortwo and Porsche Carrera GT and engineered by Nathan Armstrong, with a finished interior and new body styling. Aptera Motors then began accepting reservations from California residents for its pilot models – then called the Typ-1e and Typ-1h which are the electric and EREV gasoline-hybrid variants respectively. A switch from a diesel hybrid to a gasoline-hybrid happened due to the difficulty to get the diesel engine emissions certified in California.

Aptera entered its vehicle into the automotive X-prize competition in September 2010 but the vehicle didn't finish the 50-lap trial as it overheated after 30 laps.

=== Aptera 2 Series ===
Aptera 2 Series
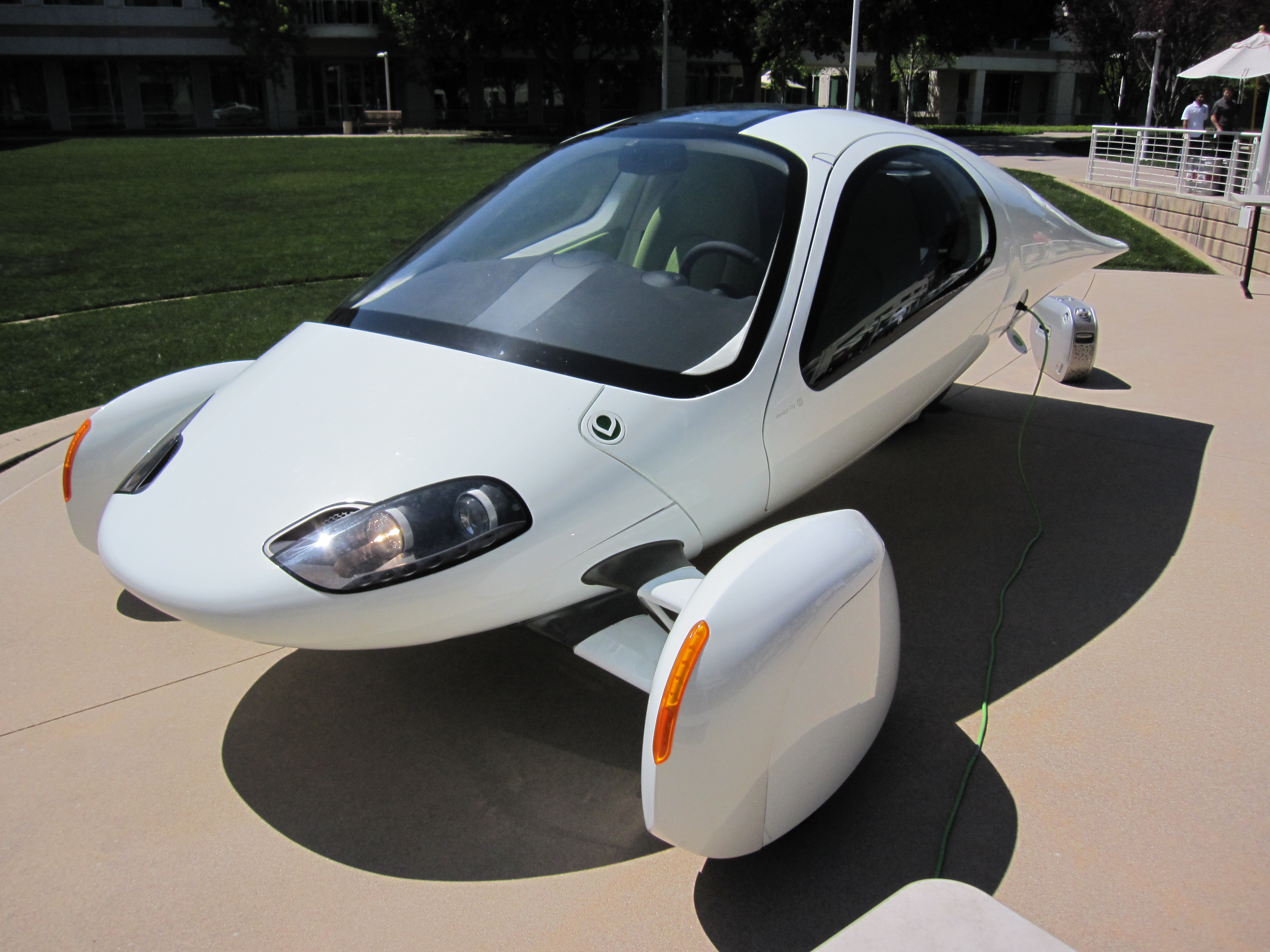

Overview
- Also called: Aptera 2e, Aptera 2h
- Designer: Jason Hill

Body and chassis
- Class: Subcompact
- Body style: 2-door three-wheeled car
- Layout: Front-engine, front-wheel drive layout

Powertrain
- Engine: 2e: Remy 82 kW electric motor 2h: Gasoline generator + electric motor
- Transmission: 2e: Borg-Warner single ratio transaxle 2h: Series hybrid layout

Dimensions
- Wheelbase: 2,819 mm (111 in)
- Length: 4,394 mm (173.0 in)
- Width: 2,311 mm (91.0 in)
- Height: 1,346 mm (53.0 in)
- Curb weight: 680 kg (1,500 lb)

The next Aptera Motors Inc. design was a three-wheeled two-seat vehicle named the Aptera 2 Series. Its advertised fuel efficiency of 300 mpg_{‑US} (0.78 L/100 km; 360 mpg_{‑imp}), when plugged in every 120 miles (190 km), would have made it one of the most fuel-efficient passenger vehicles in the world.

The first prototype attained a drag coefficient of Cd=0.11 by making use of an "Eyes-Forward" rear-view camera system instead of side-view mirrors, which create a large amount of drag. A September 2008 Aptera newsletter showed a rendering of the car featuring a conventional driver-side mirror and no driver-side rear-view camera. Aptera CTO Steve Fambro stated that the system was simplified to make use of a single camera mounted near the top of the vehicle.

An early Aptera 2h design used a "small, water-cooled EFI gasoline engine with closed loop oxygen feedback and catalytic converter," coupled with a 12 kW generator/starter. With a tank capacity of "up to five gallons," the Aptera 2h would have a claimed range of 600 to 700 miles (970 to 1,130 km), compared to the 120 miles (190 km) range of the Aptera 2e. The 2h would have been a series hybrid: The engine would not be connected to the drivetrain, instead being used to recharge the batteries.

The company opened pre-ordering for residents of California, but stopped taking deposits in July 2011. The following month, Aptera announced it would return all deposits from customers who had signed up to buy a car.

=== Aptera 4-door ===
By the time of the original company's liquidation in 2011, it had abandoned development of the Aptera 2e and had begun design of a 5-passenger, 4-wheeled EV sedan with a lightweight composite body and a projected 130-mile range. No body and only a few test mules for the car were built.

=== Aptera solar electric vehicle ===
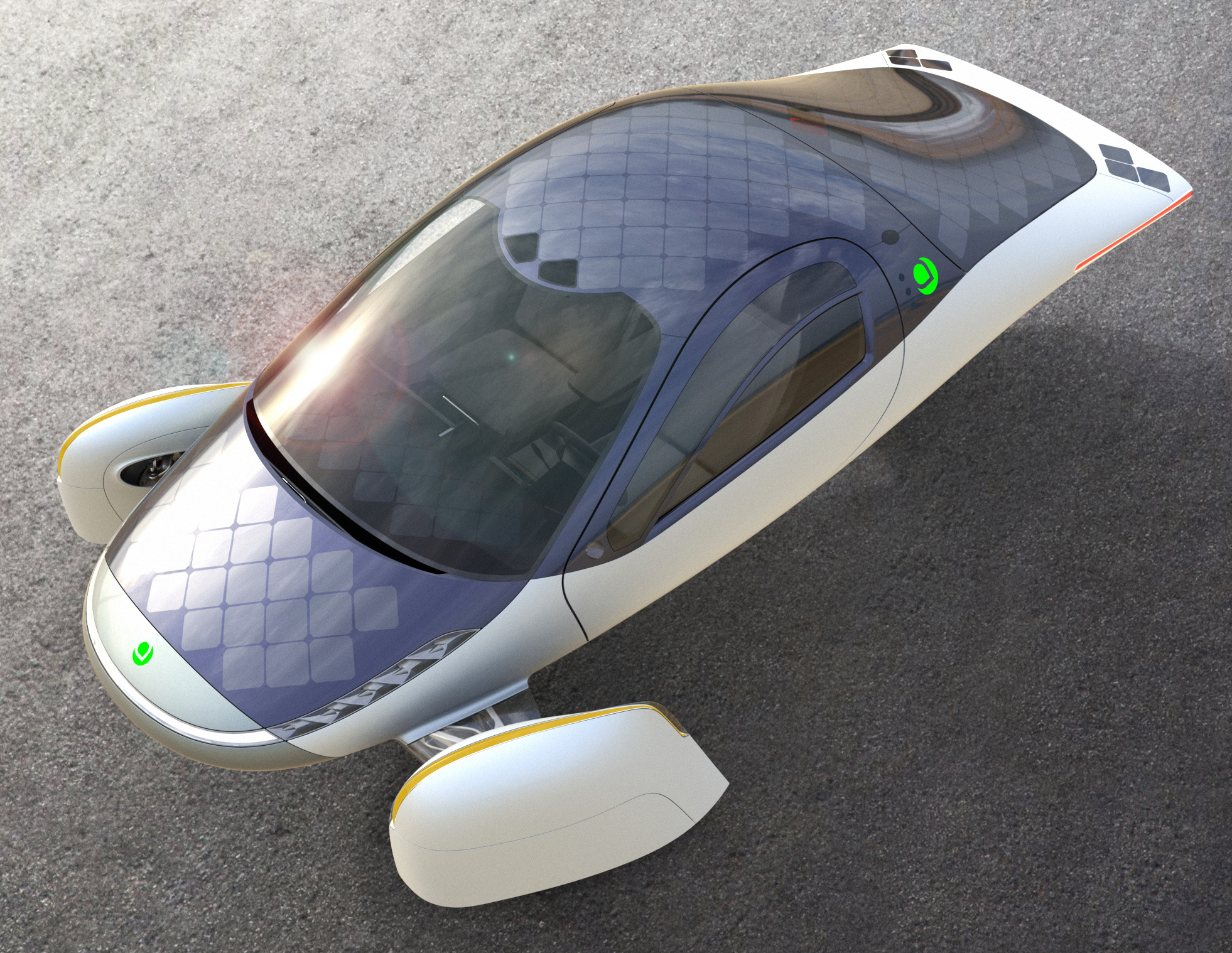
Rendering of the 2019 version of the Aptera showing its solar panels

Aptera Motors Corp. announced four planned generations of prototypes for its Aptera solar vehicle, with the third stage of prototypes nearing the final production design, and the fourth representing a prototype that's identical to production vehicles.

The 2019 planned production Aptera vehicles are two-seat, three-wheeled passenger battery electric vehicle (BEVs). The company planned 4 models with different battery sizes and predicted EPA test-cycle ranging from 250 miles (400 km) up to 1,000 miles (1,600 km). The initial "Launch Edition" model is planned to have a 42 kWh (usable) battery pack and a predicted range of 400 miles (640 km). This would make it the most efficient motor vehicle designed for mass production, with the longest battery range announced at that time. Embedded solar panels were designed to add up to an estimated 40 miles (65 km) per day from sunlight under optimal conditions.

The 2019 design included two or three 50 KW wheel hub motors. Aptera announced in June 2022 a detailed plan to scale in-wheel motor production in Slovenia by Elaphe. Due to issues with getting the Aptera in-wheel motor design to production, the in-wheel motors were replaced in 2024 with the existing production front wheel drive electric motor.

Another prototype of the Aptera vehicle was shown in January 2025 at the Consumer Electronics Show. The prototype shown at CES 2025 was "nearly" ready for production. The carbon-fiber and fiberglass panels of the vehicle were made with production tooling, however the diecast metal suspension arms and the injection-molded interior components were not.

== See also ==
- Energy-efficient passenger motor vehicles:
  - Commuter Cars Tango
  - Edison2 Very Light Car
  - Twentieth Century Motor Car Corporation
