= ZAPX =

ZAP-X may refer to:

- ZAPX, a former family movie block on the television channel YTV
- ZAP-X, a battery-powered electric vehicle manufactured by ZAP
- ZAP X, a modern device for Radiosurgery (ZAP X)
