= T600 =

T600 may refer to:

- Kenworth T600, a Class 8 truck built by Paccar
- Tango T600, an ultra-narrow electric sports car
- T-600, a fictional robot from Terminator series
