= IMW =

IMW may refer to:

- Illuminati Motor Works Seven
- Imperial Wharf railway station, London (National Rail station code)
- Irvine Meadows West formerly part of the University of California, Irvine student housing
- The International Map of the World
