= VLC =

VLC may refer to:

- VLC media player, a free software cross-platform multimedia player and framework
- Variable-length code, a code which maps source symbols to a variable number of bits
- The Very Light Car, prototype vehicle
- Visible light communication, a communications medium using fluorescent bulbs or LEDs
- Victorian Landcare Council, merged to form the Landcare Victoria Inc.
- Victorian Legislative Council, one of the two chambers of the Parliament of Victoria, Australia
- VLC, IATA code for Valencia Airport, Spain
- VLC, pre-1928 call sign for Chatham Islands Radio, one of the Call signs in New Zealand
