= Electric Raceabout =

All-electric sports car

The Electric Raceabout (ERA) is an all-electric sports car developed by the Helsinki Metropolia University of Applied Sciences. It contains lithium-titanate batteries, four direct-drive electric motors, and a carbon fiber monocoque chassis with steel sub-frames.

The ERA has an operational range of 200 km (120 mi). Its total weight is 1,700 kg (3,700 lb) with a 550 kg (1,210 lb) battery pack. The power output of its engines is 200 kW (270 hp) with a peak output of 300 kW (400 hp) / 10 seconds. The engine's nominal torque is 1000 Nm with a peak torque of 3200 Nm. The ERA has a top speed of 200 km/h (120 mph) with 0–100 km (0–62 mi) acceleration in 6.0 seconds.

The ERA was introduced in the summer of 2009 with a target to reach low-volume production.

The ERA took part in the Automotive X Prize competition and came in second in its class. ERA made a new road-legal electric vehicle lap record in Nürburgring Nordschleife in September 2011.

In the winter of 2011–2012, the ERA had its inverters, aerodynamics, and power steering upgraded – after improvements, ERA's total motor power of 282 kW (378 hp) was measured on the dynamometer. In March 2012, the ERA topped a speed of 260 km/h (160 mph) while driving on the ice at Lake Ukonjärvi, Inari. With an average speed of 252 km/h, the ERA is the fastest EV on ice. The ERA was parked outside in freezing temperatures before the event, proving that an EV can operate in freezing temperatures.

Chinese car manufacturer AET is planning to produce electric cars based on ERA technology.
