= ZAP Alias =

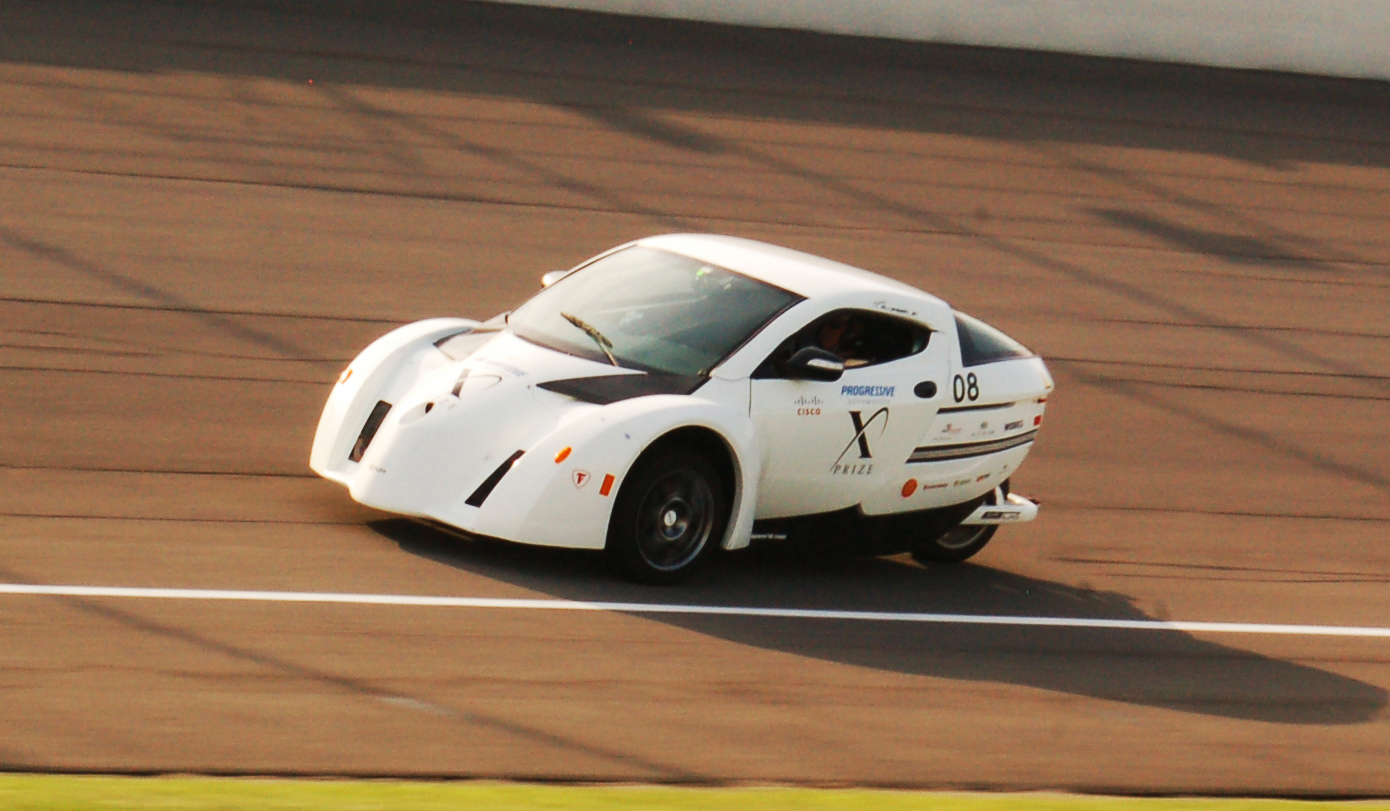

Overview
- Manufacturer: ZAP Jonway
- Production: Never produced (concept car)

Body and chassis
- Class: Sports car
- Body style: 3-seater

Powertrain
- Engine: 2 in-wheel motors (321.85 hp (240 kW) total)

The ZAP Alias Roadster was a proposed plug-in electric three-wheeled sports car from the defunct American electric carmaker ZAP in Santa Rosa, California.

== History ==
The project was initiated in 2007 through a collaboration between ZAP and Lotus Engineering, the UK-based automotive engineering company, who assisted with the development of the vehicle. Plans for a Kentucky production facility fell through, and in 2010 ZAP subsequently announced that Zhejiang Jonway Automobile would be contracted to manufacture the car in China. With the collapse of ZAP on or before 2017, the vehicle never went into production and the fate of the prototype(s) is unknown.

== Technical details ==
The vehicle has three wheels, two at the front, each containing an electric wheel-motor, and one at the rear. Its batteries are fitted underneath the vehicle in a reinforced composite battery box. The performance announced in 2008 was 0–60 mph (0–97 km/h) in 5.7 seconds, with a top speed of 156 mph (251 km/h) and a range of 100 miles (160 km). Initially planned to go into production in 2009, the first Alias pre-production unit was unveiled at NADA 2009.

During the 2010 North American International Auto Show (NAIAS) in Detroit, Michigan from January 11–24, 2010, the company revealed the revised specifications for the 216-volt AC induction motor-powered Alias prototype as 0–60 mph (97 km/h) in 7.8 seconds, with a top speed of 75 mph (121 km/h) and a range up to 100 miles (160 km). The vehicle was to be homologated as a motorcycle.

== Automotive X Prize ==
The Progressive Insurance Automotive X Prize was a global competition of teams engaging in rigorous stage competition of clean, production-capable vehicles that exceed 100 mpg energy equivalent (MPGe).

The Alias was one of 136 vehicles from a total of 111 teams registered to enter the competition. It progressed through preliminary stages at Michigan International Speedway, and survived the shakedown that was completed on May 13, 2010, after which 22 teams remained. Driven by Al Unser Jr., it qualified for the finals in July with eight other vehicles. All battery-electric vehicles went through an efficiency and performance run held on July 27, with the vehicles making 50 laps around the 2-mile (3.2-kilometre) track without exceeding 70 miles per hour (110 km/h) or dropping below 45 miles per hour (72 km/h) in a chicane along the backstretch. The Alias, using a BorgWarner single-speed eGearDrive gearbox transmission, was eliminated in this last track event at 97 miles (156 km) out of 100 miles (160 km) due to a controller setting that activated the automatic safety system, causing it to come to a stop and placing the team at 4th place in the event.
