= Spira (car) =

US-Asian minimal miniature car

Spira4U

Overview
- Type: Miniature city car
- Manufacturer: Spira4U
- Production: 2009-2014 (testing), 2015-present
- Assembly: Thailand; Philippines; San Diego, California, United States
- Designer: Lon Ballard

Body and chassis
- Class: Autocycle, Four-wheeler
- Body style: 1-door hatchback
- Layout: Rear individual wheel drive (electric version only), left rear-wheel drive (electric version only)
- Doors: 1

Powertrain
- Battery: Lithium iron phosphate battery
- Range: 200 miles (320 km) (gasoline)
- Electric range: 55 to 145 miles (89 to 233 km)

Dimensions
- Length: 10 feet (3.0 m)
- Width: 5 feet (1.5 m)
- Height: 4.3 feet (1.3 m)

The Spira (from inspiration and perspiration) is a very small and lightweight car designed to avoid creating a safety risk for pedestrians and other vehicles, especially for use in the cramped roads of Southeast Asia. Models of the car can have 3 or 4 wheels, have room for up to 1 passenger, and are available in both a small gasoline version and plug-in electric with 1 or 2 electric motors

== History ==
Lon Ballard invented the Spira and funded its creation with millions of dollars.

In 2009, it was entered into the Progressive Insurance Automotive X Prize competition.

In 2012, a special bamboo Spira car drove a total of 481 miles (774 km) on one charge, from Santa Rosa, Laguna, to Ballesteros, Cagayan in the Philippines, according to the company.

In 2014, 20 Spiras were shipped to the US.

Lon moved to China with his family and brother to start building the cars, which they demonstrated at the Detroit Auto Show in 2015.

As of April 2025, a new model can still be purchased directly from the company, although 4-wheel versions are not considered road legal in most US states due to not meeting road safety standards.

== Models ==
The Spira has had multiple models, with both gas-powered and electric versions.

The 2015 electric version weighs 520 pounds (240 kg), has an estimated efficiency of 300 MPGe, a maximum speed of 60 miles per hour (97 km/h) and an estimated range of 55 miles (89 km), 95 miles (153 km), or 145 miles (233 km) miles depending on battery pack option. The 2015 models were equipped with steering tillers instead of the standard steering wheel of most vehicles.

In 2017 and prior, the Spira came with three wheels and a steering tiller, but later models transitioned to coming with a more traditional four wheels and a steering wheel. The 2017 model with the 55 miles (89 km) range battery option costed $8,500, and the 95 miles (153 km) range battery option costed $10,000.

The gas version is powered by a 150 cc four-stroke scooter motor, converted to fuel injection. Its 2015 version weighs 440 pounds (200 kg), has an estimated fuel efficiency of 80 MPG, has a maximum speed of 53 miles per hour (85 km/h) and a range of 200 miles (320 km) on a 2.5-US-gallon (9.5 L) gas tank.

== Design ==
Much of the vehicle is created from parts normally used on motorized scooters, with the dual-motor electric version using two independent rear wheels with hub motors. Additionally, nearly the entire vehicle structure is made of reinforced plastic, nylon, or polyurethane foam. The company says that the car's foam acts like millions of tiny airbags during collisions, which offers protection to pedestrians, bicyclists, and motorcyclists.

Despite the company's emphasis on vehicle safety, models as late as at least 2021 have numerous safety issues, including:

- No rearview mirror
- Poorly sized windshield wipers
- On models with steering wheels, hard plastic on the wheel and no airbag.
- Unreliable steering
- Exposed internal parts/machinery
- Rickety suspension
- Poor throttle and brake reactions
- Doors able to come open during driving
- Parts such as foam panels and the rear wheel shrouds barely attached with only a few permanent fasteners or potentially-unsafe welds and easily-broken-off connecting tabs.

In addition, the road noise can be loud, and gauges and weatherproofing may be unreliable.

Due to the low density of the vehicle, it is capable of flotation.
