= ZAP Xebra =

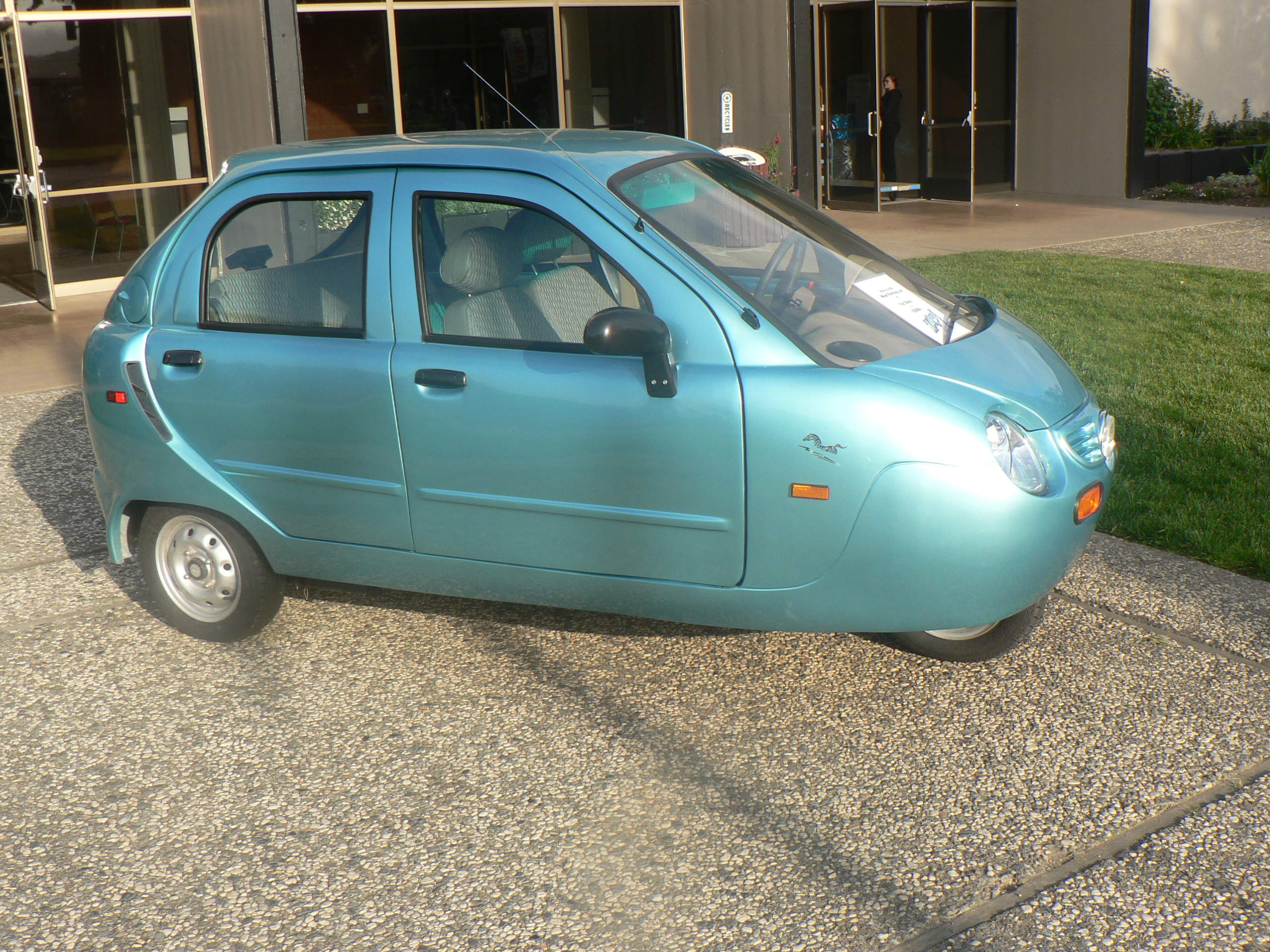
- 2006 ZAP Xebra

Overview
- Manufacturer: ZAP
- Also called: Fulu FL5000ZK-1
- Production: 2006–2009

Body and chassis
- Class: sedan, truck
- Body style: Five-door sedan/truck
- Layout: Rear-wheel drive

Powertrain
- Electric motor: DC brushed

The ZAP Xebra was an electric car launched in May 2006 in the United States market by ZAP corporation. It is classified legally as a three-wheel motorcycle in some jurisdictions, and is available in both sedan (model SD) and pickup (model PK) truck variants. It has seat belts. It does not have regenerative braking. The PK pickup has a dump bed, with fold-down sides and tailgate, that allows easy access to the batteries, controller, motor, and charger.

Although Zap listed a price for model year 2010, the Xebra was phased out after 2009. In 2013 the company was ordered to buy back all of the 2008 models that were sold and destroy them due to a failure to meet the braking requirements for a motorcycle.

== Characteristics ==
The top speed of the Xebra is 36–40 mph (58–64 km/h), with a range of about 20–25 miles (32–40 km) with the standard batteries, or 40 miles (64 km) with the optional extended range batteries.

The sedan version had four seats and four doors, but was limited by its weight rating of 500 lb (227 kg). The listed cargo weight capacity for the PK pickup is 1,000 lb (460 kg), although PK owners in user forums report their PKs have carried more weight than that after modifications.

An optional rooftop-mounted solar panel on the Xebra Xero variant allows for trickle solar charging, which should lengthen the range and life of the six traction batteries; it was also available as a roof over the PK pickup bed.

The 2008 "version 6" all-steel-bodied version of the Xebra sedan entered production in late 2008.

The Xebra was the first production vehicle to be imported from China to the United States. It was available from licensed ZAP/Voltage Vehicle dealers. According to the owner and dealer reports, some of the early 2006 models had problems with the bodywork, DC-to-DC converters, controllers, or chargers. They were not properly waterproofed and would degrade and malfunction when wet. Newer models delivered in 2007 are waterproofed and these problems are resolved. More recent models have been greatly improved with many low-quality parts being eliminated in the new production facility. Some replacement parts, even on new vehicles, are hard to find. The company claimed to have resolved these issues with the building of and move to a more modern, moving production line facility.

According to various news reports, over a hundred and fifty Xebras were sold in 2006. The PK became available in late 2006. According to ZAP themselves, 500 Xebra sedans and pickups had been ordered by July 2007.

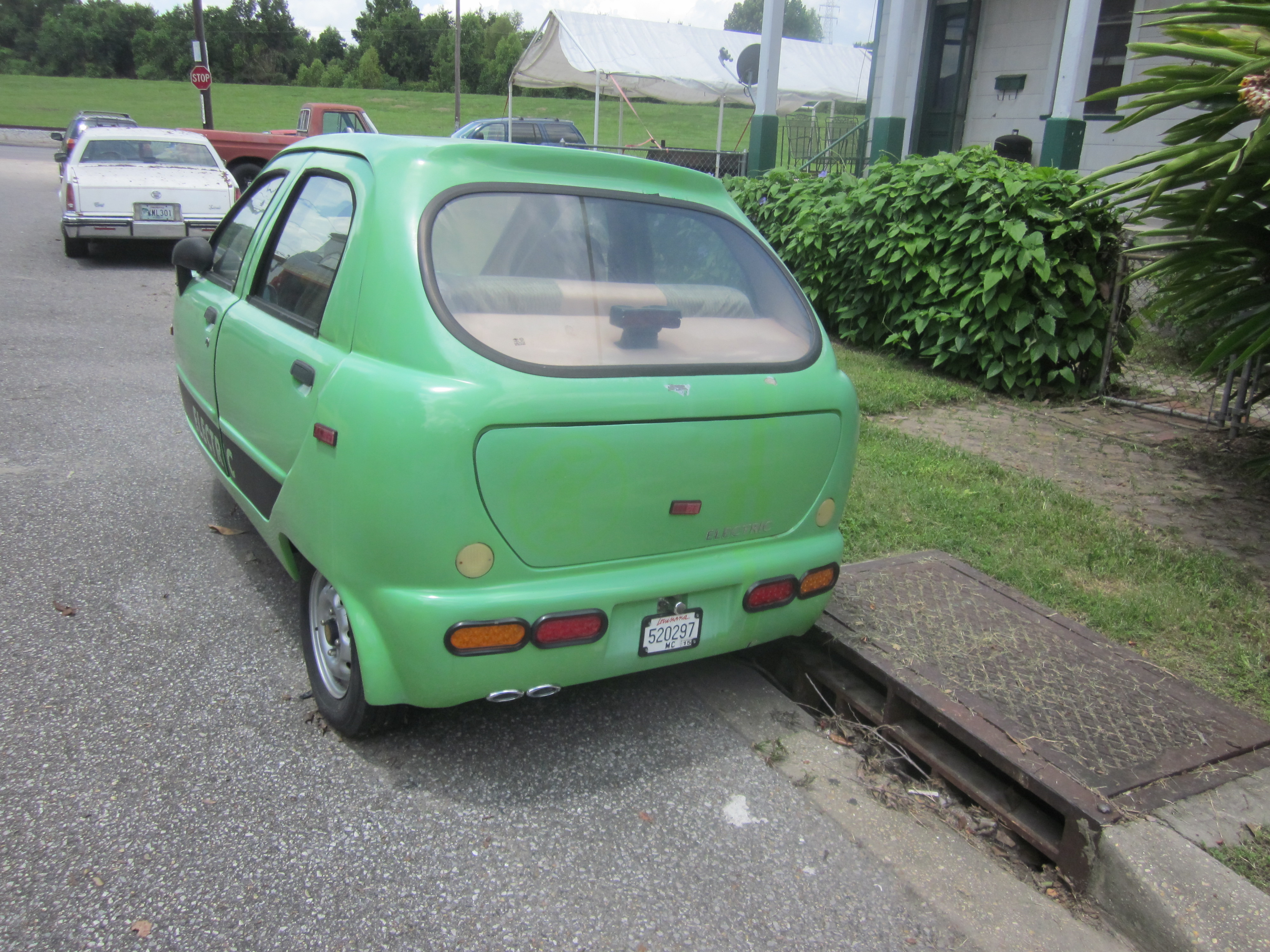
Rear view of Xebra SD

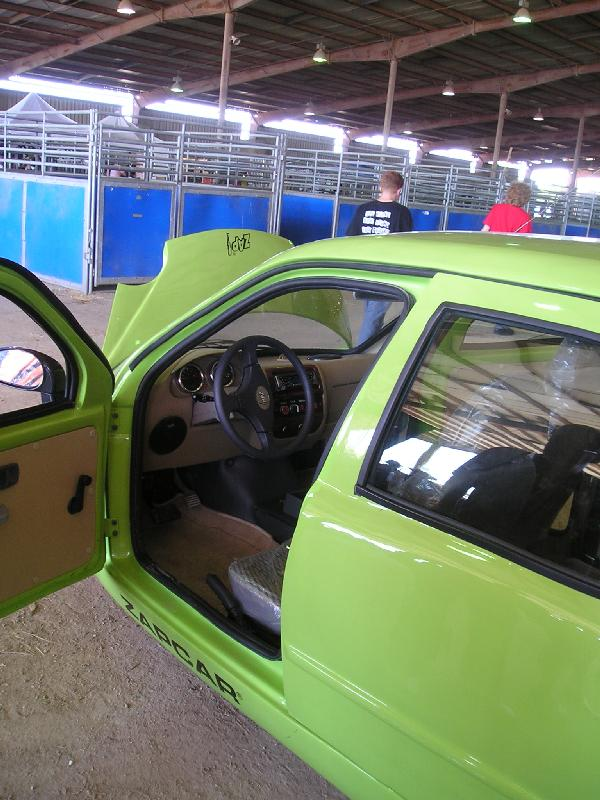
Interior of the Xebra

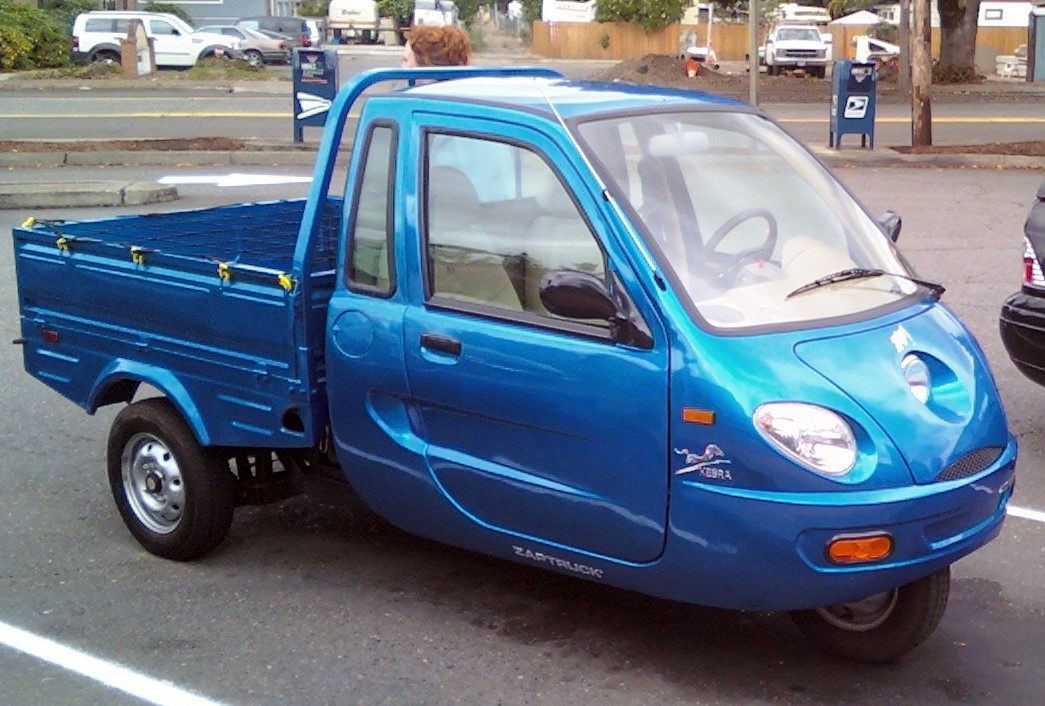
A ZAP Xebra PK (pickup truck)

Some details:

- Dimensions: 10 ft × 4.66 ft × 5.05 ft high (2.90 m × 1.42 m × 1.54 m high);
- Weight about 1800 lb
- Speed: Up to 40 mph (65 km/h) (limited by a governor)- 36 mph in practice,
- Range: Up to 40 miles (65 km). Typically 30 miles @ 20 mph (50 km @ 30 km/h), or 20 miles (32 km) in practice with the standard batteries
- Seating: 4 (SD sedan) or 2 (PK pickup)
- Motor: 5 kW (6.7 hp) DC brushed Newer 2008 models have brushless DC motors.
- Batteries: six lead–acid sealed gel 12-volts deep-cycle traction batteries of about 100 ampere hours (@20 h discharge) each (for a total of 72 volts) plus a 12-volts accessories battery. High-capacity batteries up to about 138 A·h are available as an option. Some dealers offer seven batteries for 84 volts. 2008 models are sold with 140 A·h absorbed glass mat batteries
- Classification: 3-wheel motorcycle (depending on jurisdiction)
- Imported from China
- Brakes: 3-wheel disc brakes (no power assist, no ABS, no regenerative braking)
- Models: sedan SD, pickup truck PK, sedan SD Xero with solar panel on roof, and pickup truck PK Xero with solar panel over bed

== Recall ==
In January 2013, Quingqi Group Motorcycle Co. announced it was recalling all Zap Xebra vehicles from 2008 to resolve a braking issue. The 2008 vehicles had steel bodies, rather than fiberglass; the extra weight overwhelmed the brakes which were unable to meet the minimum brake distance requirement along with lacking a master cylinder and no indicator for low brake fluid or low pressure. The same examples were recalled a second time in 2012 to fix the same problem, and, in 2013, the company was ordered by the National Highway Traffic Safety Administration to buy back the approximately 700 2008 models that were sold, and have them either destroyed or otherwise permanently disabled.

== TV Stardom ==
In the TV series Monk's seventh season episode “Mr. Monk on Wheels”, a Zap Xebra was driven by one of Dean Berry, played by Bradley Whitford. The car is shown with a crudely attached solar panel fixed to the roof. The Zap’s appearance is listed on the Internet Movie Car Database.

== See also ==
- Electric motorcycles and scooters
- List of motorized trikes
