= Illuminati Motor Works Seven =

Prototype electric vehicle

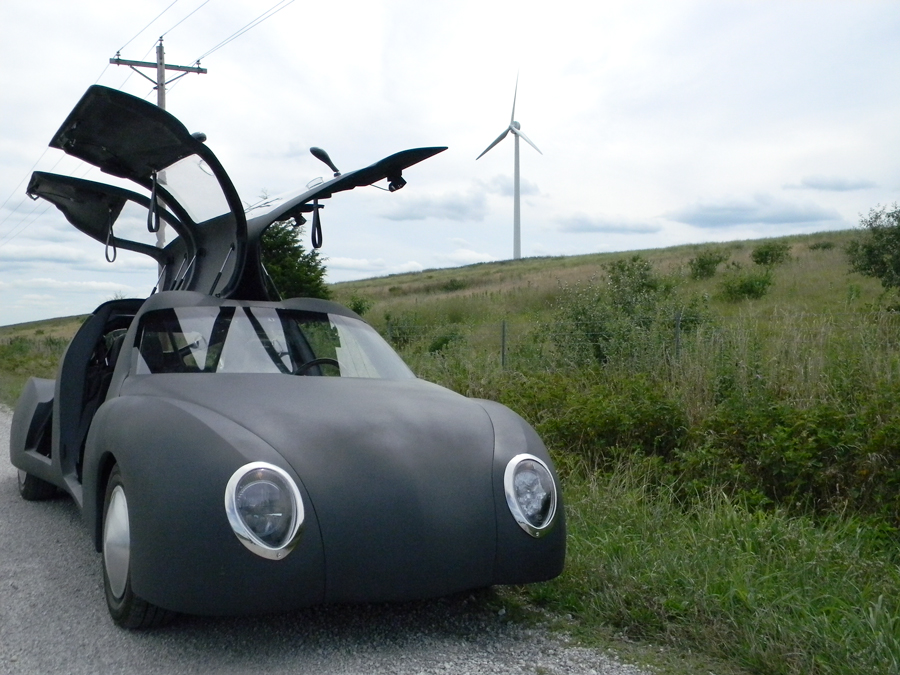

Overview
- Manufacturer: Illuminati Motor Works
- Assembly: United States: Divernon, Illinois
- Designer: Kevin Smith and Josh Spradlin

Body and chassis
- Class: Full-size
- Body style: 4-door Gull-wing
- Layout: Front motor, front-wheel drive

Powertrain
- Electric motor: MES DEA 200-330 AC induction motor
- Transmission: 1-speed fixed gear
- Battery: 32 kWh LiFePo4 (LFP)
- Electric range: Over 200 mi (322 km) (207 MPGe)

Dimensions
- Length: 5,334 mm (210 in)
- Curb weight: 1,320 kg (2,911 lb)

Illuminati Motor Works Seven is a prototype of a 4-passenger battery electric vehicle. It was handcrafted by Illuminati Motor Works (IMW), and placed second in the mainstream class of the Progressive Automotive XPRIZE with a combined rating of 119.8 MPGe. It has since achieved an EPA rating of 207 MPGe when tested at the Chrysler proving grounds through funding provided by the X PRIZE foundation and the US Department of Energy and now surpasses the MPGe of all three winning vehicles of the Progressive Automotive XPRIZE.

== Illuminati Motor Works ==
Illuminati Motor Works is a volunteer group of mostly self-funded automotive enthusiasts, engineers, technicians, and artists located in Central IL. Kevin Smith (Team Leader/Engineer), Nate Knappenburger (Electronics Technician), Jen Danzinger (Graphic Artist/ Web Liaison), Josh Spradlin (Graphic Designer/Parts Hound/ Fabricator), Nick Smith (Master Craftsman), Thomas Pasko (Master Automotive Technician), and George Kennedy (Engineer) comprised the core team at the Progressive Automotive XPRIZE.

== Design ==
Seven's design emphasizes aerodynamics and is constructed of hand-sculpted foam and fiberglass over a steel frame. In 2013 the body was re-sculpted and molds were created. New body panels were constructed from carbon fiber and Kevlar. It utilizes recycled and off-the-shelf components including a 32 kWh battery pack (99 Thundersky 100 amp hour lithium iron phosphate cells with 3.2 V nominal voltage), a MES DEA 200-330 electric induction motor, modified 1997 Geo Metro/Suzuki Swift transmission, Mazda Miata windshield, and more.

== Performance statistics ==
Post competition performance statistics are as follows:

- Top Speed: 130 mph (209 km/h)
- Range: Over 200 mi (320 km)
- Miles Per Gallon equivalent (MPGe): 207.5 mpg_{‑US} (1.134 L/100 km; 249.2 mpg_{‑imp})
- Lateral Acceleration: 0.87g
- 0–60 mph (97 km/h) Acceleration: 6.2 seconds
- Accident Avoidance: 48.32 mph (77.76 km/h)

== Awards ==
- 2014 Most Fuel Efficient Vehicle - 2014 Toyota Green Grand Prix
- 2014 1st in Class (Exhibition) - 2014 Toyota Green Grand Prix
- 2013 Best in Class (Other) - 12th Annual International Route 66 Mother Road Festival
- 2013 3rd Place EVCCON 1/8 mile drag race

== Elimination from Automotive XPrize ==
Seven was eliminated from the knockout round of the Progressive Automotive XPrize for failure to achieve 0–60 mph (97 km/h) acceleration within 15 seconds. This was due to a slipping clutch which had already reduced the vehicle's efficiency to an MPGe of 119.8 mpg_{‑US} (1.963 L/100 km; 143.9 mpg_{‑imp}) on the track.
