= Commuter Cars Tango =

Ultra narrow electric sports car

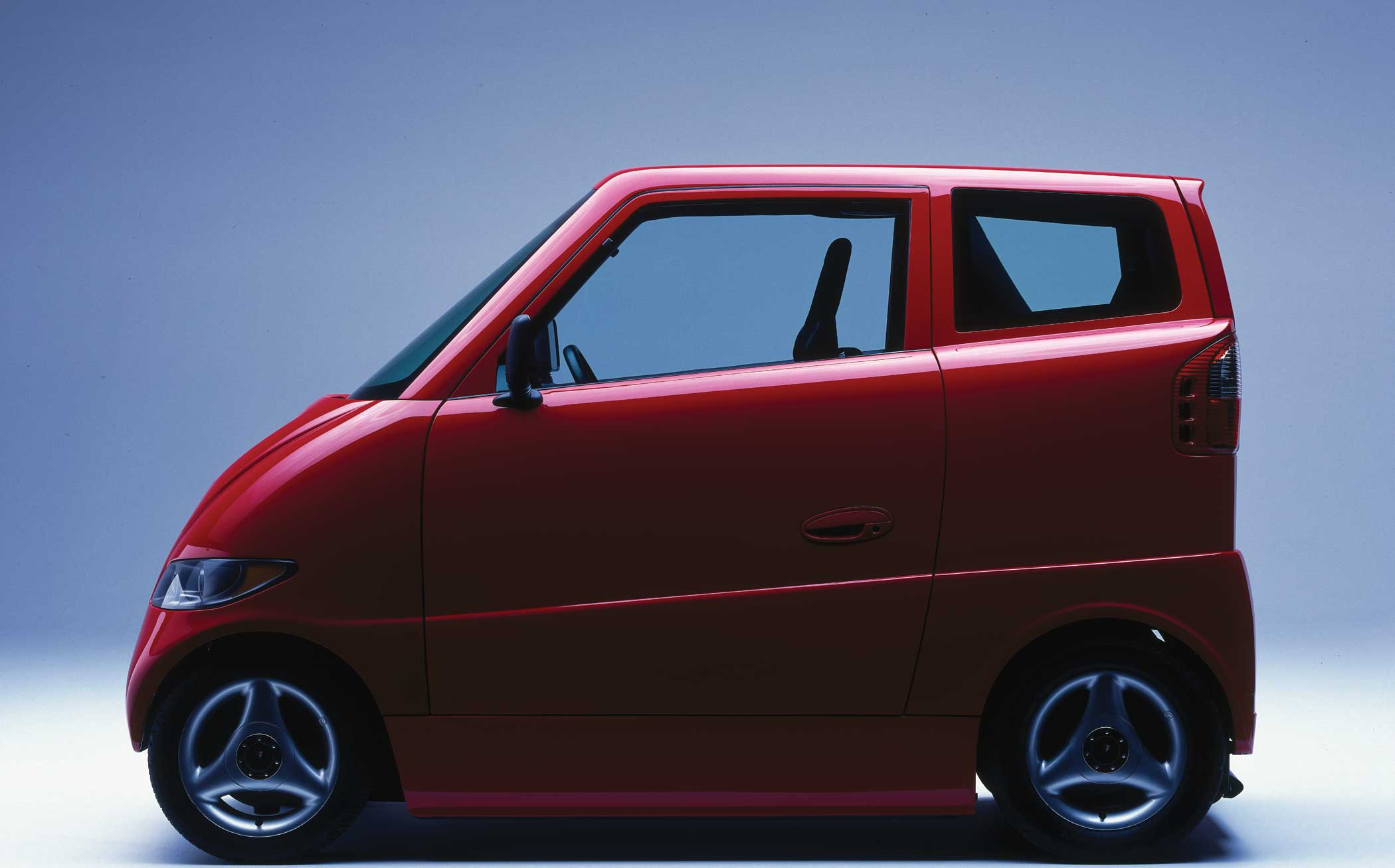
- The Tango is 8 ft 5 in (257 cm) long and 39 in (990 mm) wide.

Overview
- Manufacturer: Commuter Cars

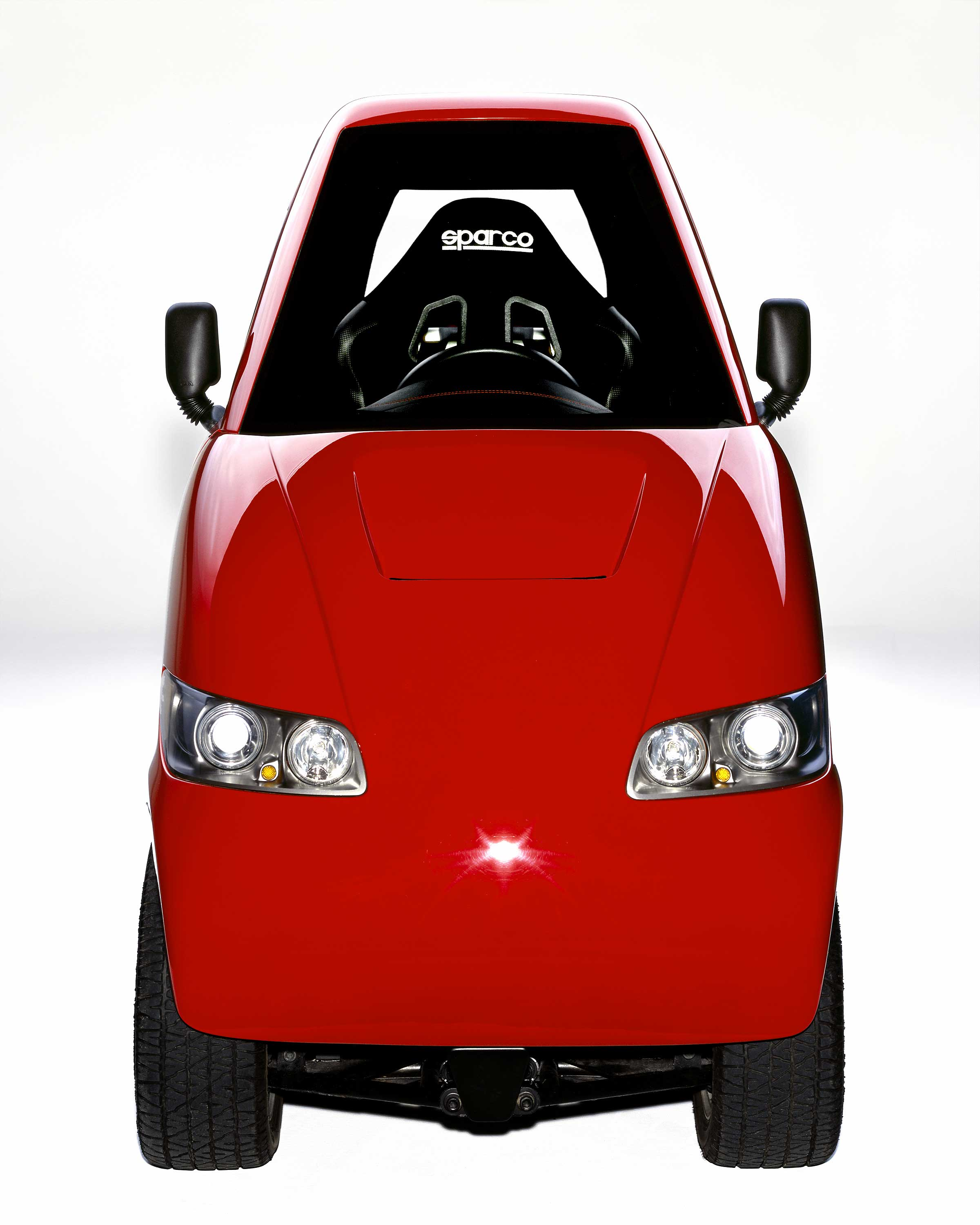
Front view

The Commuter Cars Tango is a prototype ultra-narrow electric sports car designed and built by Commuter Cars, an electric car company based in Spokane, Washington.

== History ==
Commuter Cars was founded in Spokane, Washington, by Rick Woodbury and his son Bryan Woodbury in 1998. Bryan Woodbury says that his father had come up with the original idea sometime in the early 1980s. He had learned that 106 million people in the United States were driving to work alone. He came up with the idea for a single-seat electric car. In the 1980s, Woodbury began researching hydrogen power, which led to fuel cells. The relatively lightweight nature of the fuel cells led to his idea of a stable, narrow vehicle with a low center of gravity. While waiting for fuel cell technology to catch up, he eventually settled on a design for the car to have individual electric motors for each wheel. In his spare time, he worked on building his first car. In 1998, he sold his yacht to fund the company. He settled on a plan to use parts that were already produced, instead of producing every part for the vehicles. Commuter Cars used various parts manufactured for other, more common cars. Among those parts was a safety cage made to NASCAR specifications.

Production of the first of their line of ultra-narrow electric sports cars began with the Tango T600. The company designed a small electric car. They stated that production of the first version, at a rate of about 100 cars per year, was set to begin in late 2005. Actor George Clooney took delivery of the first Tango kit on August 9, 2005, which was a major milestone for the company. Clooney appeared in the press with the car, explaining its features and promoting it. Difficulties with their UK manufacturer forced Commuter Cars to take over manufacturing themselves; for this reason, the second vehicle did not ship until February 11, 2008. It was completely assembled in Spokane, Washington. The second car eventually found its way into the second-floor office of Google CEO Eric Schmidt as part of an April Fools' Day joke.

By 2008, Commuter Cars had produced only 10 cars, each selling for an average of $121,000. The company generated a significant amount of media interest with the sale to Clooney. However, that initial media attention did not lead to a production deal.

In 2010, the company entered the Progressive Insurance Automotive X Prize in the "Alternative" category. The vehicle entered was a Tango T600 owned by Google founder Sergey Brin, borrowed back for the competition. After passing many of the performance tests with ease, the car failed to complete the 100-mile durability run (one of the more complex requirements for the prize) and was eliminated from the competition. The company did not get a production deal with a manufacturer, and by 2014, fewer than 20 cars had been built in the United States.

Throughout the company's history, Commuter Cars has had limited financial resources. Whenever the company did generate a profit, it reinvested the money in research and production capacity for its future vehicles. When the company had sufficient funding during 2007, it employed eight workers and was able to manufacture one car each month.

By 2018, Car and Driver magazine gave the company a 1.1 out of 10 chance of survival.

== Overview ==
The Tango is narrower than some motorcycles and may be small enough to legally ride side-by-side with other small vehicles in traffic lanes in some jurisdictions. Capable of seating two passengers in a tandem arrangement, it takes up only one-quarter of a standard parking space and can park sideways. One prototype vehicle was produced by the company and shipped to Prodrive in the United Kingdom in January 2005, where the design was refined for production models.

Commuter Cars states that the Tango's heavy battery pack and low ground clearance combine to give it a center of mass 11 in (280 mm) above the ground, allowing for stable handling. About two-thirds of the 3,000 lb (1,400 kg) curb weight of the prototype is taken up by the batteries, twin motors, and controller, which are mounted low in the frame. Commuter Cars states that production models are expected to weigh less, ranging from 2,200 to 2,500 lb (1,000 to 1,130 kg). Propulsion is provided by two electric motors. To extend its range, an optional generator cart can be attached to the Tango.

== Recharge ==
Commuter Cars notes that a dryer outlet will give most of the charge in an hour, or a full charge in less than 3 hours. With a 120-volt outlet, the batteries can fully charge overnight. With a 200-amp off-board charger, the Tango can be charged to 80% in about 10 minutes.

== Specifications ==
- Width: 39 in (990 mm)
- Length: 101 in (2,600 mm)
- Weight: 3,000 lb (1,400 kg) (claimed)
- Batteries: 12 V * 19 Hawker Odysseys or 25 Exide Orbital XCDs or Optima Yellow Tops. Lithium-ion battery options available
- Nominal voltage: 228 V with 19 Hawkers, 300 V with 25 batteries, 250 V with lithium-ion batteries.
- Charging: 50 A Manzanita Micro on-board charger with Avcon conductive coupling. 200 A off-board charger under development.
- Motors: 2 Advanced DC Motors DC FB1-4001 9", one driving each rear wheel with claimed 1,000 lb⋅ft (1,400 N⋅m) of combined torque at low rpms. 8,000 rpm redline. or 4 motors, one for each wheel, lithium batteries.

Performance (claimed)

- 0 to 60 mph (0 to 97 km/h): 3.2 seconds
- 1/4 mi (0.40 km): 12.25 seconds @ 106 mph (171 km/h)
- Top speed: 150 mph (240 km/h)
- Range: 40–60 miles (96–128 km) with lead-acid batteries. 150 mi (240 km) with lithium-ion batteries.
- 805 hp claimed.

== See also ==
- Peel P50
- Isetta
- William Garrison – studied concept of narrow vehicles
