= The Very Light Car =

Prototype low weight and high efficiency automobile

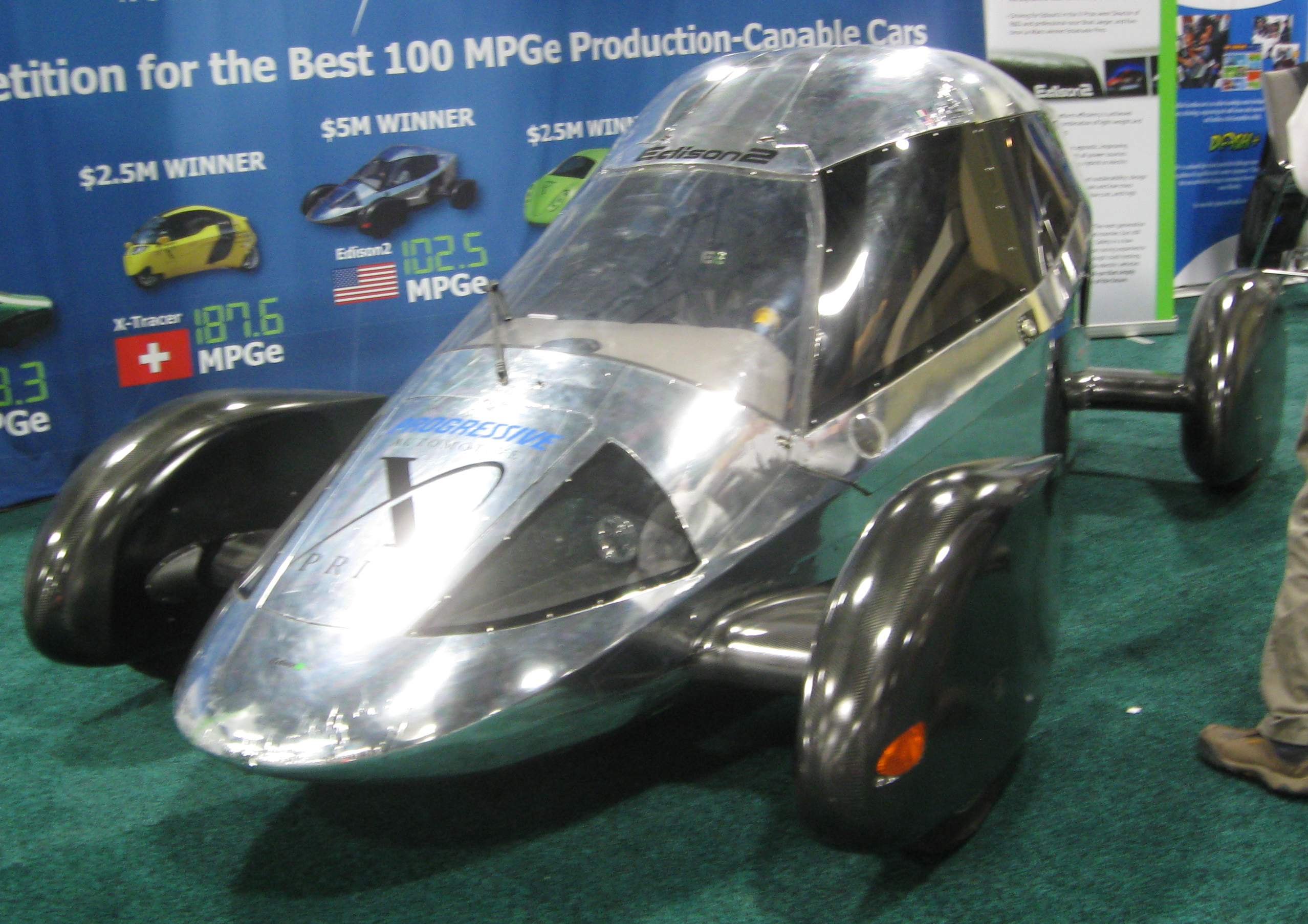
The Very Light Car prototype

The Very Light Car (VLC) is a prototype design for 2- and 4-passenger automobiles emphasizing low weight and overall efficiency. It was originally developed by the Edison2 team for the Automotive X Prize competition. Two such 4-passenger cars were the only qualifiers in the finals of the "mainstream" division of the competition, and one of them won the 2010 division prize of $5 million with a competition fuel economy of 102.5 MPGe.

The design emphasizes mainstream rather than exotic materials, extreme low weight (less than 450 kg (1000 lbs)) and very low aerodynamic drag (coefficient of drag <0.16). Significant design innovations include in-wheel suspension and safety design derived from endurance auto racing.

== Edison2 team ==
Edison2 was founded by Oliver Kuttner, a Virginia entrepreneur and auto enthusiast, and is headquartered in Lynchburg, Virginia. The VLC development involved over 100 of its own and other companies' employees. After the contest, the team brought on designer Jason Hill and electric vehicle expert Ron Cervan.

== X-Prize competition vehicles ==
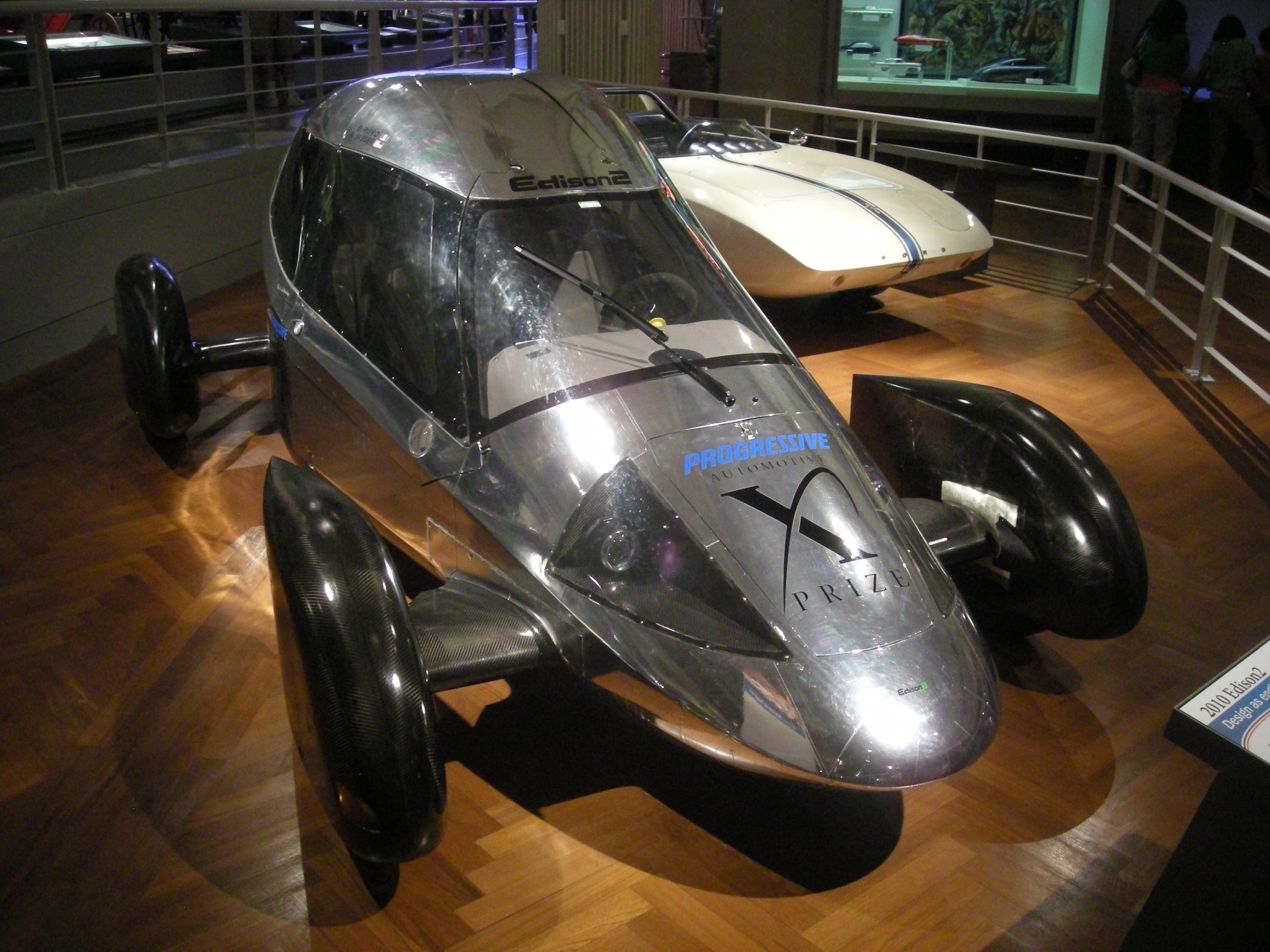
2010 Edison2

Their four competition vehicles were powered by small (250cc) one-cylinder E85-gasohol-fueled internal combustion engines. The aim was to achieve the prize's requirement of 100 MPGe or higher fuel economy. A small E85 internal combustion engine was chosen for the competition in order to have the lowest possible powerplant and fuel weight, high energy density, low pumping losses, and an engine design with an efficiency sweet spot at cruising speed; while meeting mileage and emission standards. The fuel-vs-batteries tradeoff was especially onerous in the mainstream class, because it had a higher 200-mile range requirement, doubling the potential size of a heavy battery pack for hybrid and EV designs.

Their two 4-passenger cars were the only qualifiers in the finals of the "mainstream" division of the competition. All other mainstream entrants broke down in qualifying rounds or failed to achieve minimum MPGe requirements. One of them won the 2010 division prize of $5 million with a fuel economy of 102.5 MPGe. Edison2 could not participate in final validation tests at Argonne Laboratories because two engines were damaged during the coast-down portion of final tests before validation. "Competition officials ruled that Edison2 was not at fault for the incidents at Coast Down that damaged the engines of both of their Mainstream Class entries." In the absence of time and finances to repair and calibrate engines, "officials granted Edison2 a waiver from validation testing. However, Roush laboratories, a separate third party, had conducted dynamometer tests for Edison2 in preparation for Knockout and Finals rounds of the Xprize, and officials reversed an earlier decision to eliminate any vehicle unable to complete validation and agreed to review those results to determine whether they can be accepted in lieu of testing at Argonne." After Coast Down and before tests at Argonne Labs, Xprize officials determined: "The engine failures were found to have been caused by third-party drivers of the vehicles, however, and were not blamed on vehicle design or capabilities." Edison2 was permitted to provide independent third-party validation reports instead of undergoing the same validation testing as other finalist teams. Progressive Automotive Xprize posted Edison2's final MPGe results in a press release on their website.

In addition to its entries in the X Prize "mainstream" division, the team also entered one additional vehicle in each of the two "alternative" (2-passenger) divisions. The side by side alternative class entrant, #96, "failed to meet the minimum 67 MPGe fuel-economy requirement" during the knockout phase of the X Prize competition and was eliminated. The tandem alternative class entry suffered catastrophic engine failure, possibly due to a software problem, and was also eliminated.

== Current work ==
After winning the X-Prize, Edison2 continues work on further VLC prototypes, developing more aerodynamic bodies, an electric drive train, and further refining the innovative in-wheel suspension. In addition, further prototypes are aimed more at consumer acceptance than bare-bones competition requirements. The eventual aim is to have established auto manufacturers pick up low-weight designs for mass production, and possibly license individual technologies, such as the in-wheel suspension.

== Recognition and awards ==
- Shared the 2010 Progressive Insurance Automotive X PRIZE.
- Selected by Time Magazine as one of the 50 Best Inventions of the Year 2010
