= ZAP (motor company) =

Former American automobile company

- Industry: Automotive, Electric Vehicle
- Founded: 1994
- Founder: Gary Starr (Co-Founder); Jim McGreen(Co-Founder)
- Defunct: 2017
- Headquarters: Santa Rosa, California, United States
- Key people: Priscilla Lu (Chairman); Steven Schneider (CEO); Angelo Aviles Sr. (co-CEO); Gary Dodd (President); H. David Jones (COO); William Hartman (CFO)
- Products: ZAP Alias; ZAP Dude; ZAP Electric Taxi; ZAPVAN Shuttle; ZAP Xebra; ZAPTRUCK XL
- Revenue: ▼US$-4.07 million (2009)
- Net income: ▼US$10.69 million (2009)
- Total assets: ▲US$13.78 million (2009)
- Total equity: ▲US$3.52 million (2009)
- Number of employees: 35
- Subsidiaries: Zhejiang Jonway (51%)

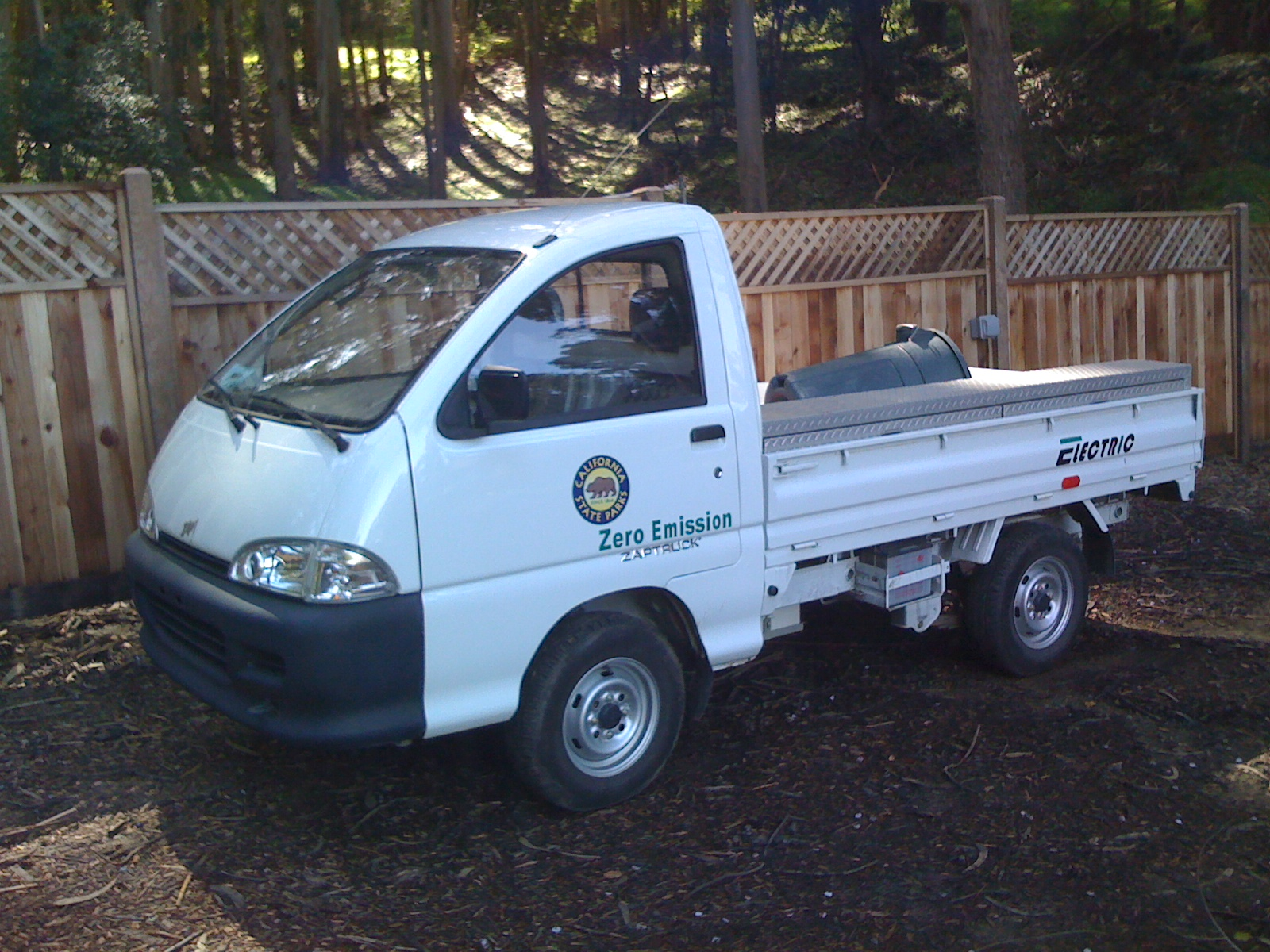
ZAPTRUCK XL electric truck charging at Angel Island California State Park.

ZAP was an American company that specialized in electric vehicles of various types, such as cars, motorcycles, bicycles, scooters, watercraft, hovercraft, ATVs and commercial vehicles. Its name was an acronym for Zero Air Pollution. It was based in Santa Rosa, California, but it is no longer active. The last record of the company in the California Secretary of State business entity database shows that its agent for service of process resigned on October 26, 2016.

== History ==
ZAP Power Systems (for Zero Air Pollution), was launched by Jim McGreen in 1992 with the goal of designing, building and selling innovative electric vehicles. The company was incorporated on September 23, 1994, as ZAP Power Systems of Sebastopol, California, by Jim McGreen and Gary Starr, where they started manufacturing electric-powered kits and bikes and then later the zappy scooter. Gary Starr was chosen as a business partner by Jim McGreen due to his previous experience with producing electric powertrains at companies such as Solar Electric Engineering which was later renamed U.S. Electricar, which converted hundreds of vehicles including trucks for Ford and General Motors to run on electric power and was later renamed Enova Systems.

In 1995, ZAP began the manufacturing of electric bicycle systems, including products such as the ZAP DX and SX, as well as the ElectriCruiser, PowerBike, S&W Patrol Bike, ZAPTRIKE.

In 1996, Zap began to offer direct public offering stock, and debuted an advanced Tricyclopod, the Zappy folding electric scooter (invented by co-founder McGreen).

In February 1997, an arrangement was made with Chinese bicycle companies for ZAP's drive system supply. In April 1997, ZAP agreed to sell electric bikes to Brunswick Corp. By May 1997, ZAP signed a distribution agreement with Fondmetal Export AG.

In March 1998, Zap's first electric bike store was opened in San Francisco.

In 1999, ZAP Power Systems announced a corporate name change to ZAPWORLD.COM and the company made multiple business agreements with companies such as Smith & Wesson, Veiculos Electricos, CSW Total EV, and Electric Motorbike and announced the launch of the "Z-Boat".

In late 1999, Gary Starr ousted Jim McGreen as president and CEO of ZAP, and put himself in charge of the company.

In May 2000, ZAP introduced a line of sea scooters with battery-powered propulsion, and the KICK-PUSH Scooter. Also, the company appointed John Dabels as President of ZAP following the acquisition of EMB in 1999. Dabels was the former marketing director of the GM EV1 program.

In January 2001, Dabels resigned as President of ZAP due to an unwillingness to relocate manufacturing to Asia.

In 2001, ZAP introduced a solar powered scooter and changed the corporate name of the company to simply "ZAP". ZAP also unveiled the ZAPADAPT, an electric-assist for manual wheelchairs at the 2001 Abilities Expo.

In June 2000, ZAP acquired Aquatic Propulsion Technology Inc, and announced a joint venture with Ningbo Topp Industrial Co. Ltd.

In March 2001, ZAP entered into a strategic alliance with Sun Pirate. In May 2001, ZAP formed a joint venture with Voltage Vehicles to develop, design, manufacture and distribute a full line of electric vehicles.

Around 2002, ZAP filed for Chapter 11 bankruptcy, and reorganized with Gary Starr as the chairman of ZAP. Starr hired Steve Schneider to be the new CEO of ZAP.

In February 2010, ZAP was awarded an engineering contract for the design and development of an electric version of the Grumman LLV, the mail truck used by USPS since 1987.

By 2017, the ZAPworld.com website seemingly went out of use. The current fate of the company is somewhat unclear.

=== Expansion into China ===
In February 2008, ZAP created a joint venture with Chinese company Youngman Automotive Group, to revive the nascent Detroit Electric brand.

In December 2009, a joint venture company in Hangzhou, China was formed by ZAP, Holley Group, and Better World International, named ZAP Hangzhou.

In July 2010, ZAP confirmed an agreement to acquire a stake in Zhejiang Jonway Automobile. Approval to do so was confirmed by the Chinese Department of Commerce in Zhejiang Province in September 2010.

In June 2014, ZAP announced a major deal with battery maker Tianjin Battery Company Ltd, also known as Lishen to convert 1,000 fleet vehicles to use electric power only.

== Business units ==
ZAP had two primary business units: ZAP Electric Vehicles and ZAP Recharge-It-All.

=== ZAP Electric Vehicles ===
The company operated a lease and finance program for sales of its automotive product line which included the ZAPTRUCK XL and ZAPVAN Shuttle, two low-speed vehicles for the fleet market, the ZAP Xebra Truck and Sedan, and also developed and commercialized electric power-assist system motor kits for bicycles, as well as electric bicycles, electric ATVs and personal electric scooters.

The wholly owned subsidiaries were: Voltage Vehicles, a Nevada company engaged in the distribution and sale of advanced technology and conventional automobiles; ZAPWorld Stores, Inc., engaged in consumer sales of ZAP products in one location; ZAP Manufacturing, Inc., also a Nevada company, engaged in the distribution of ZAP products; RAP Group, Inc., was engaged in the sale and liquidation of conventional automobiles; and ZAP Rental Outlet, a Nevada company. (ZAP World Outlet, ZAP Rental Outlet and RAP Group are now inactive subsidiaries).

=== ZAP Recharge-It-All ===
This division was focused on portable energy solutions, or batteries. Through the Recharge-It-All line the company sold battery packs to power or charge a range of mobile electronics such as cellular phones, digital cameras, and laptops, providing significantly more charge time than available technologies. The Portable Energy devices fell under two product lines: universal chargers and those for Apple devices. The universal chargers were rechargeable battery packs that extended the use of small and medium-sized electronic devices up to two to five times their normal battery life.

== Fleet vehicles ==
The reorganized ZAP's market strategy was announced to cover fleet needs, with four tangible products launched until date, the ZAP Xebra (2006), ZAP Dude ATV (2008), ZAP Truck XL (2008) and the ZAP Shuttle Van (2008).

=== ZAP Xebra ===
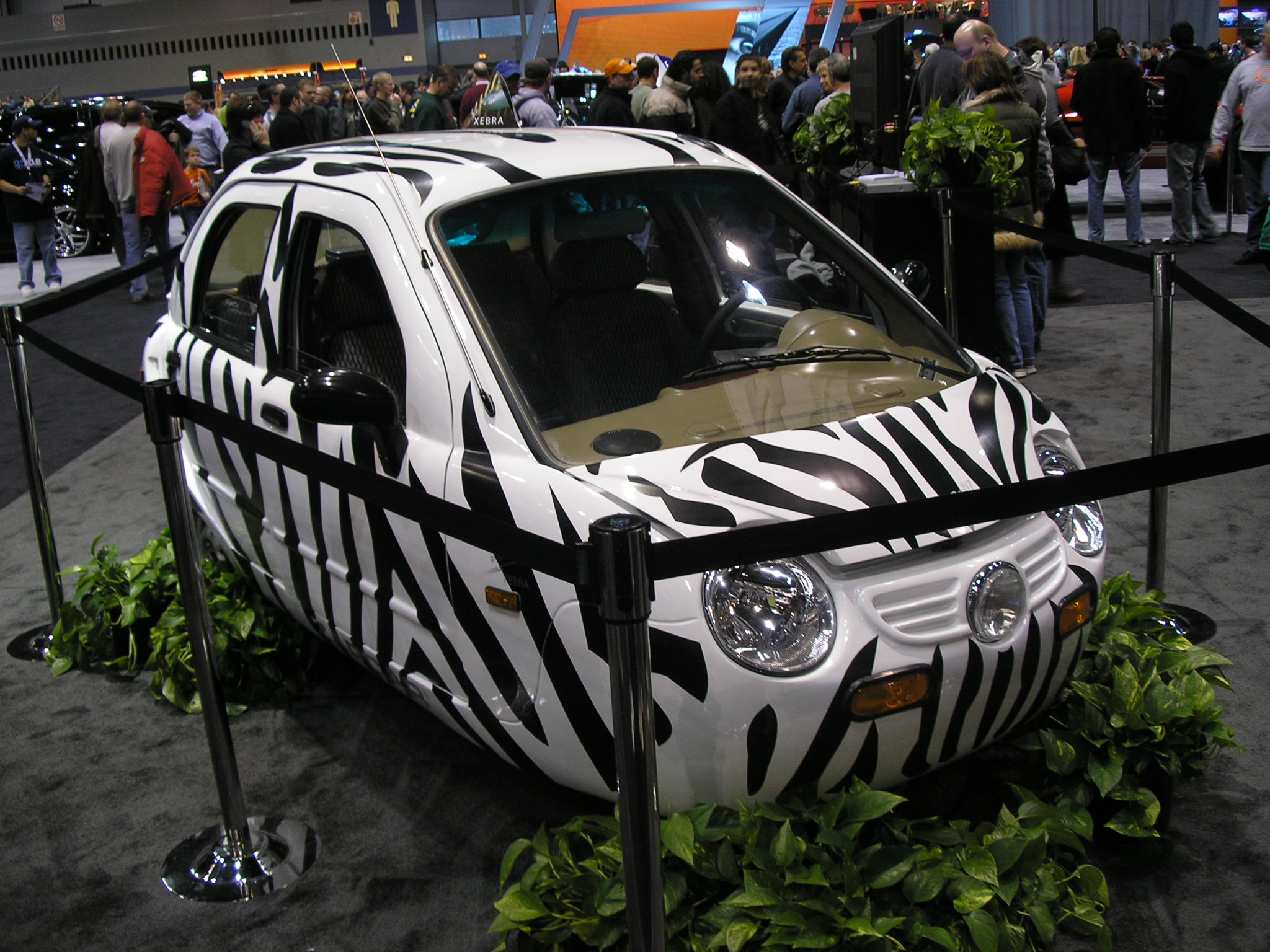
The Zap Xebra 2007 Chicago Auto Show

The ZAP Xebra was a three-wheeled all-electric city car capable of 40 mph (64 km/h), charges from a 120 V outlet. Serves Domino's Pizza delivery service in Las Vegas, Aspen in the US, Coca-Cola distribution model in Montevideo, Uruguay and includes an adapted version: The Xebra Truck. The United Parcel Service (UPS) in Northern California combines a fleet of Xebra trucks and sedans to expand small parcel deliveries, after UPS delivery vans transfer smaller packages to locked storage unit, an electric Xebra car/truck transports packages into dense urban and residential areas where parking and traffic are easier for the smaller vehicles. After several hundred vehicles were produced, the production of this vehicle was phased out in 2009.

- Xebra Legal Issues: Massachusetts

According to a July 2008 editorial in Wired magazine, motorists in Massachusetts were unable to register the ZAP Xebra legally, because the vehicle did not fit the state's definition of either a car or a motorcycle. Registrants of ZAP Xebras received letters from the state's Registry of Motor Vehicles stating that their vehicle registration plates had been revoked and their registrations were invalid.

- Resolution

Both the United States House of Representatives and United States Senate overrode Massachusetts state law, when they passed legislation on December 31, 2009; allowing three-wheeled motor vehicles in Boston roads. The change was achieved through joint efforts by the Registry of Motor Vehicles, state Senator Robert L. Hedlund from Weymouth, Massachusetts, and state Representative Garrett J. Bradley from Hingham, Massachusetts.

=== ZAP Dude ATV ===
The electric four-wheeled all-terrain vehicle, ZAP Dude ATV, was designed for installation security patrols and maintenance functions and can go up to 25 mph (40 km/h). It has a range of 25 miles (40 km) with a 48-volt permanent-magnet brush DC motor and standard 65-amp-hour absorbed glass mat (AGM) lead acid batteries. it has a charging time to 4 to 6 hours and the continuous power to 4-kW, both indicators improvable with a lithium battery technology. Is the cheapest in the company's electric vehicle portfolio.It has been introduced to natural reserve patrols, US Military,as well as agriculture and farming markets, where usage is scheduled and power stations are strategically located.

Dude ATV specifications

Motor	48V DC motor
Continuous Power / Peak Horse Power	4 kW / 12 hp
Length/ Width/ Height/ Weight	76"/ 40"/ 43"/ 707 lbs
Max. Capacity (Weight/ Tow/ Rack)	290 lbs/ 650 lbs/ 100 lbs (front & rear)
Wheelbase/ Turning Radius	46.5"/ 124"

- There was an attached statement that range would vary depending on hill grade, speed, and rider weight.

=== ZAP Truck XL ===
The ZAPTRUCK XL classifies as a Zero Emission Vehicle (ZEV), with an off-road payload up to 1,900 lb (860 kg) and a convertible truck bed, have served a small contractor company from California, Ghilotti Construction Co., to move parts off site, UPS delivery services have also added the four-wheeled vehicle mostly to its Bay Area parcel fleet needs, the Federal Aviation Administration (FAA) have added the vehicle to their transportation operating mode. The U.S. Military has been putting the vehicle to test by engaging them into logistics tasks since 2009.

== Products under development ==
=== ZAP-X ===
The ZAP-X is an electric crossover SUV previously expected to be launched in 2008 by ZAP and Lotus Engineering based on the Lotus APX prototype platform. The claimed potential performance was a total of 644 bhp (480 kW; 653 PS) from four in-wheel electric motors, a 350-mile (560 km) single-charge range, 155 mph (249 km/h) top speed, 0 to 60 mph (97 km/h) acceleration in 4.8 seconds and a 10-minute recharge time, with an estimated production cost of over $395 million together with the Alias. This product has not been offered for sale to the public.

=== ZAP Electric SUV/Taxi ===
ZAP is developing the ZAP Electric SUV/Taxi, an all-electric family SUV, tested at the Korea Electric Vehicle Challenge from March to early April, an on-road multistage demonstration event of three rest and recharge stops that includes a 220 km freeway rally at average speeds of 80–85 km/h(52.8 mph). Vehicle presented ahead of the Beijing International Automotive Exhibition by the CEO of ZAP, Steve Schneider, as the company latest effort. The model was also available with a fuel efficient engine based on Jonway's A380 platform.

=== ZAP Alias Roadster ===
The ZAP Alias Roadster is a plug-in electric three-wheeled sports car from the American electric car maker ZAP that was originally scheduled to go into production in 2009, with two wheels at the front, each containing an electric wheel-motor, and one at the rear, the project initiated in 2007 through a collaboration between ZAP and Lotus Engineering, the UK-based automotive engineering company, who are assisting with the development of the vehicle. Was supposed to have gone into production in 2009. The performance announced in 2008, was 0-60 mph (97 km/h) mph in 5.7 seconds, with a top speed of 156 mph (251 km/h) mph and a range of 100 miles (160 km). The vehicle was a finalist at the 2010 Progressive Insurance X Prize driven by Al Unser Jr., but was eliminated due to mechanical failure in the 97th mile of a 100-mile track event.

== Controversies ==
=== Fraud allegations ===
It has been reported by Wired that "ZAP has taken millions from investors and dealers eager to see the company's line of green cars hit the road. But that line has never materialized." Reportedly, ZAP board members made misleading claims about the company's prospects, allowing them to enrich themselves at the expense of dealers who bought franchises and did not receive the cars that they were expecting to sell.

Although such claims were not verified, ZAP has been criticized for over-issuing stock and warrants while failing to expand the model lineup or show significant profit. While the company sold the low-end Xebra models for a number of years, more expensive, higher-performance models have been repeatedly announced but not produced.

Due to this controversy, there have been allegations about ZAP being an investment scam.

=== Smart Car dispute ===
In 2004, Daimler Chrysler abandoned their Smart Car division in the United States, claiming that there was not enough demand for the product. In 2005, ZAP took the initiative and started Americanizing Smart Cars they purchased from European dealers. In doing so they secured orders totaling $2.2 billion.

In the case ZAP v. Daimler Chrysler AG, et al., Superior Court of California, County of Los Angeles, Case No. BC342211. On October 28, 2005, ZAP filed a complaint against Daimler Chrysler Corporation and others in the Los Angeles Superior Court. The complaint includes claims for intentional and negligent interference with prospective economic relations, trade libel, defamation, breach of contract – agreement to negotiate in good faith, breach of implied covenant of good faith and fair dealing, and unfair competition. The complaint alleges that Daimler Chrysler has engaged in a series of anti-competitive tactics aimed at defaming ZAP and disrupting its third-party business relationships. As a result of the allegations, the complaint requests damages in excess of $500 million per claim and such other relief as the court deems just and proper.

ZAP sold shares and dealer franchises, partially based on its intention to sell and finance the retrofitting of the Smart Car to USA standards. The importation and conversion to meet US safety and EPA regulations was engineered and performed by G&K Automotive of Santa Ana, CA. Zap quoted mileage figures for the car as being in the mid 40 range. This calculation was taken from UK test figures and was based on the larger(+20%) Imperial gallon. When tested by the EPA at their Ann Arbor lab, it was found that true mpg figures were in the low to mid 30s, but Daimler-Chrysler, the Smart car's manufacturer, said that ZAP's behavior revealed "both the sham nature of its purported business and a lack of trustworthiness that is nothing short of stunning." Although ZAP never claimed to have a deal with Daimler Chrysler directly, according to filed reports ZAP was the first company to import Smart cars to the US and did sell 300 Smart cars that it bought from independent Daimler-Chrysler distributors, it also filed suit against Daimler-Chrysler in California for libel and business interference. ZAP won the initial filings but Daimler won a later appeal based solely on jurisdiction.

=== Franklin, Kentucky, plant ===
Plans to begin construction of a manufacturing plant in Franklin, Kentucky, were announced by ZAP in August 2008, but construction plans were halted in November 2008 due to the Great Recession. ZAP planned on contracting Integrity Manufacturing LLC to build and operate the plant while maintaining ownership of the plant. The plant was expected to bring 4,000 jobs to the town of Franklin.

The plant was controversial due to the fact that the state of Kentucky had been expected to subsidize the plant with taxpayer money. In addition, ZAP was offered various tax incentives such as tax exemptions and rebates.

== See also ==
- Battery electric vehicle
