= Can-Am Spyder =

Three-wheeled motorcycle

BRP Can-Am Spyder Roadster
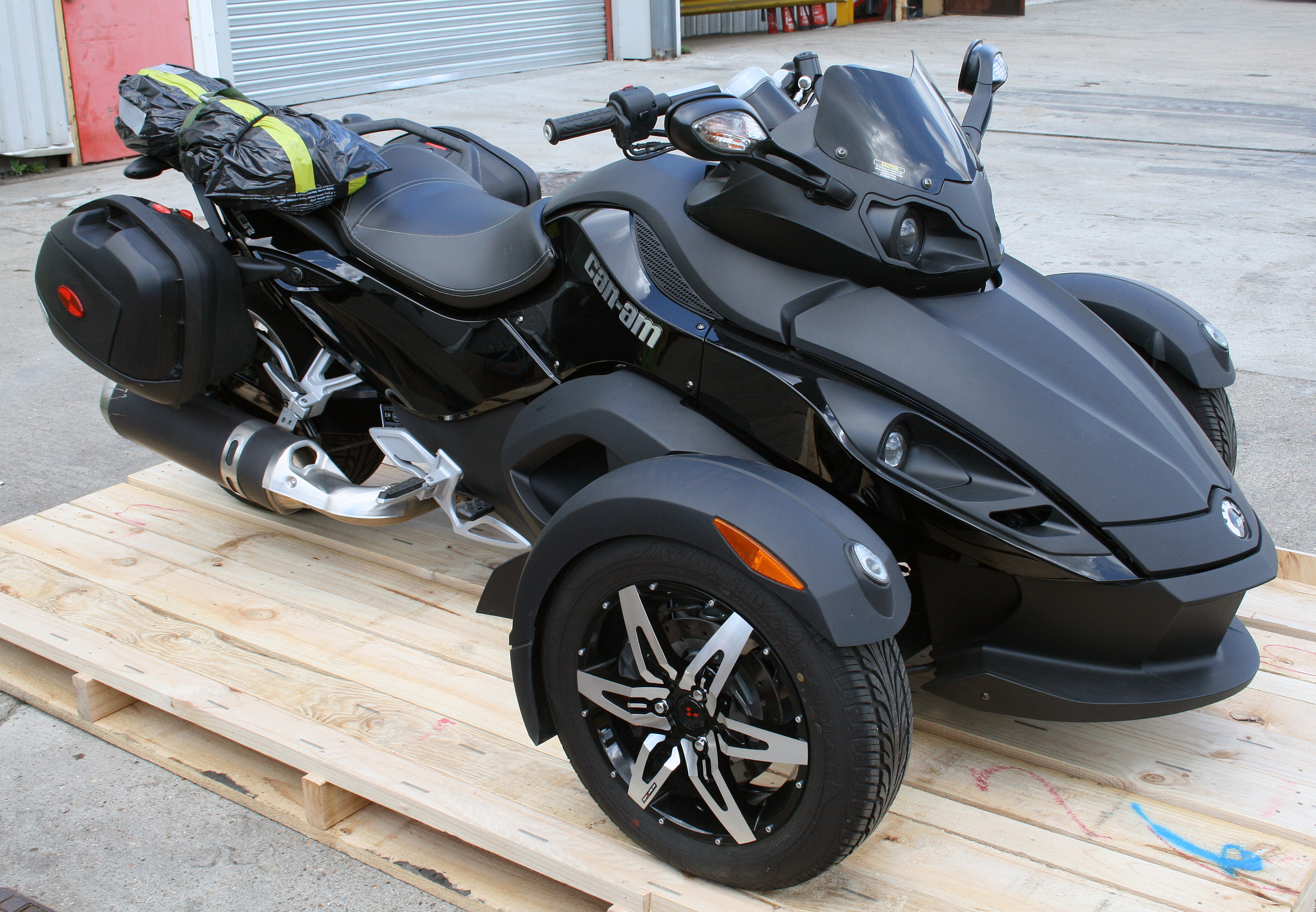
- Manufacturer: Bombardier Recreational Products
- Production: 2007–present
- Class: Sport-touring/roadster
- Engine: BRP-Rotax 998 V-Twin EFI; Rotax 1330 ACE in-line 3 cylinders,
- Transmission: 5-speed manual with reverse 5-Speed paddle-shift Electronic with Reverse; 6-speed manual with reverse 6-Speed paddle-shift Electronic with Reverse
- Suspension: Front: 144mm double A-arm with anti-roll bar Rear: swingarm - 145mm monoshock
- Brakes: BRP foot-actuated, fully integrated hydraulic 3-wheel braking system Front: 4-piston calipers with 10.2 in × 0.25 in (259.1 mm × 6.4 mm) disc Rear: Single-piston caliper with 10.2 in × 0.25 in (259.1 mm × 6.4 mm) disc
- Tires: Front: KR21 165/65R14 on 14x5 rim Rear: KR21 225/50R15 on 15x7 rim Cast aluminum wheels
- Wheelbase: 68 in (1,700 mm)

The Can-Am Spyder ("Spyder") is a three-wheeled motorcycle manufactured by Can-Am motorcycles, a division of Bombardier Recreational Products. The vehicle has a single rear drive wheel and two wheels in front for steering, similar in layout to a modern snowmobile. The Spyder uses an ATV-like chassis. The manufacturer refers to it as a "roadster," but in technical terms, it is more of what has been traditionally called a trike.

== Sales ==
The Can-Am Spyder was officially launched in February 2007. By October 2007, approximately 2,500 units had been sold. By May 2009, 12,500 Spyders (9,932 of them sold in the United States) had been manufactured. Approximately 21 percent of its sales are to women. In addition, some 27 percent of Spyder owners have never previously owned a motorcycle.

In 2015, during the annual "Spyderfest" gathering in Springfield MO, the 100,000th Spyder was delivered.

== Features ==
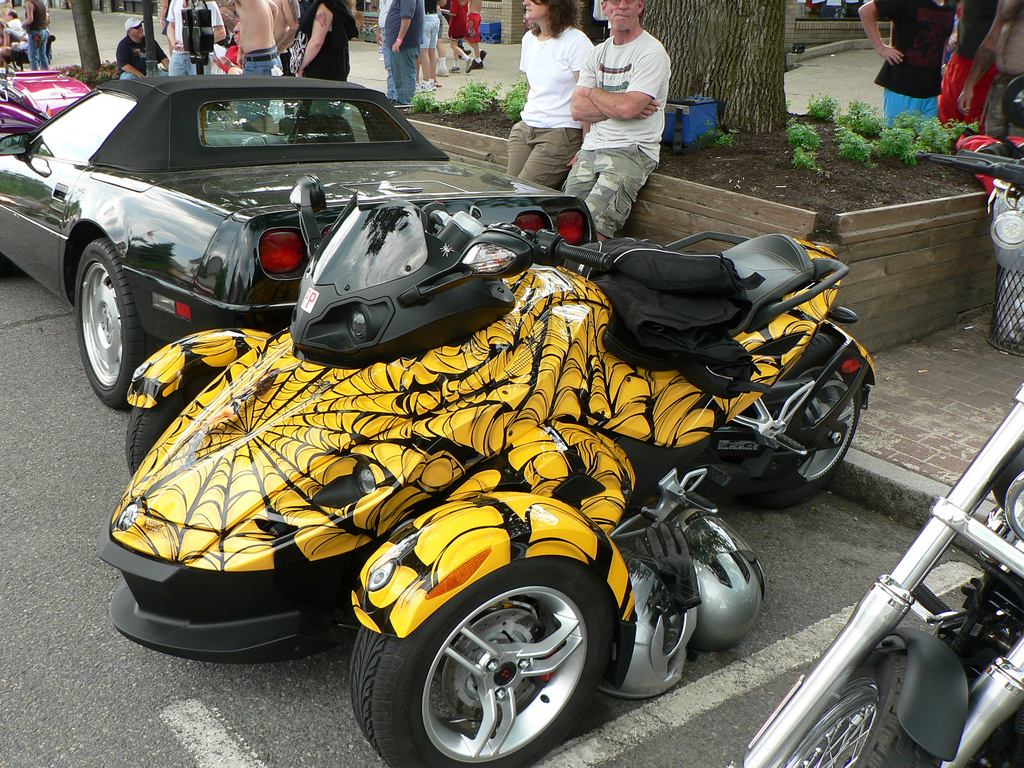
Customized Can-Am Spyder

The Spyder has traction and stability control, and anti-lock brakes. In most US states the Spyder is licensed as a motorcycle. In California, Delaware, Nevada, and South Carolina only a regular driver's license is required—however, helmet laws apply in California as they do for all motorcyclists.

All Spyder models have storage space under the hood at the front of the vehicle, referred to as a frunk. Top rear dual helmet boxes and other accessories for the Spyder are also available.

The Spyder also has front and rear brakes which are both actuated by the same foot pedal, a reverse gear, power steering and an optional electric shift (clutchless) transmission.

== Models ==
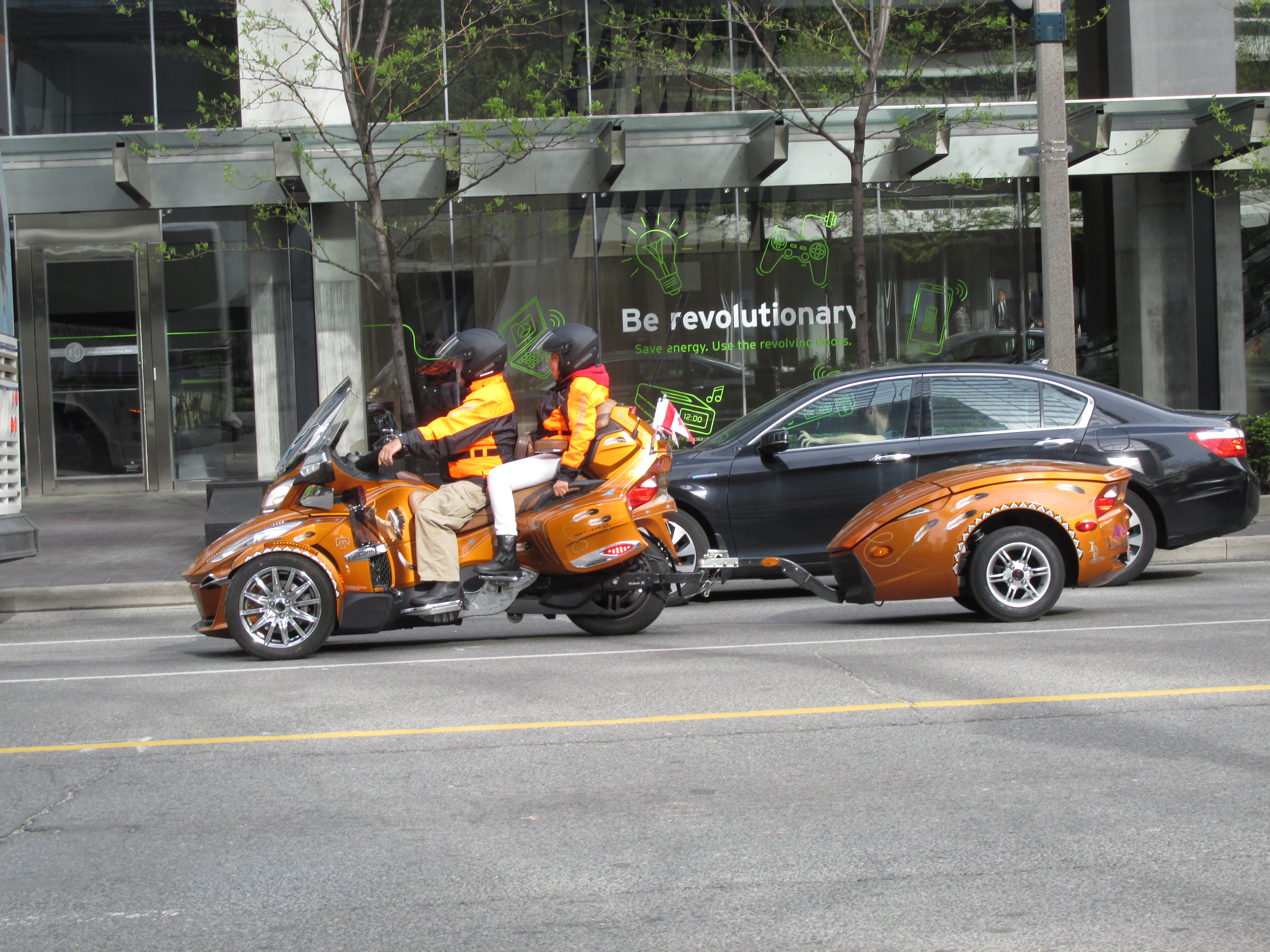
Can-Am Spyder with trailer

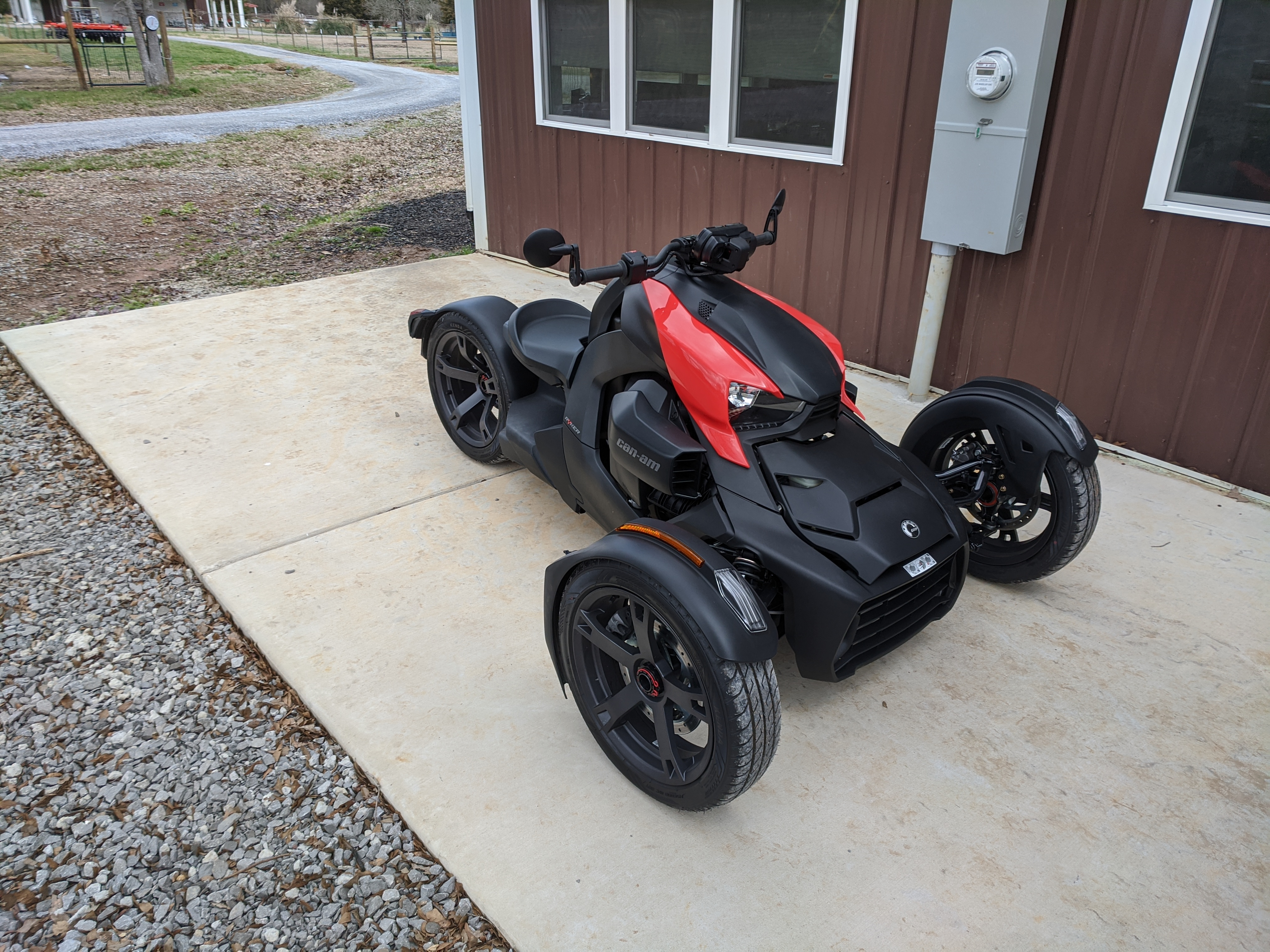
2019 Can-Am Ryker 600

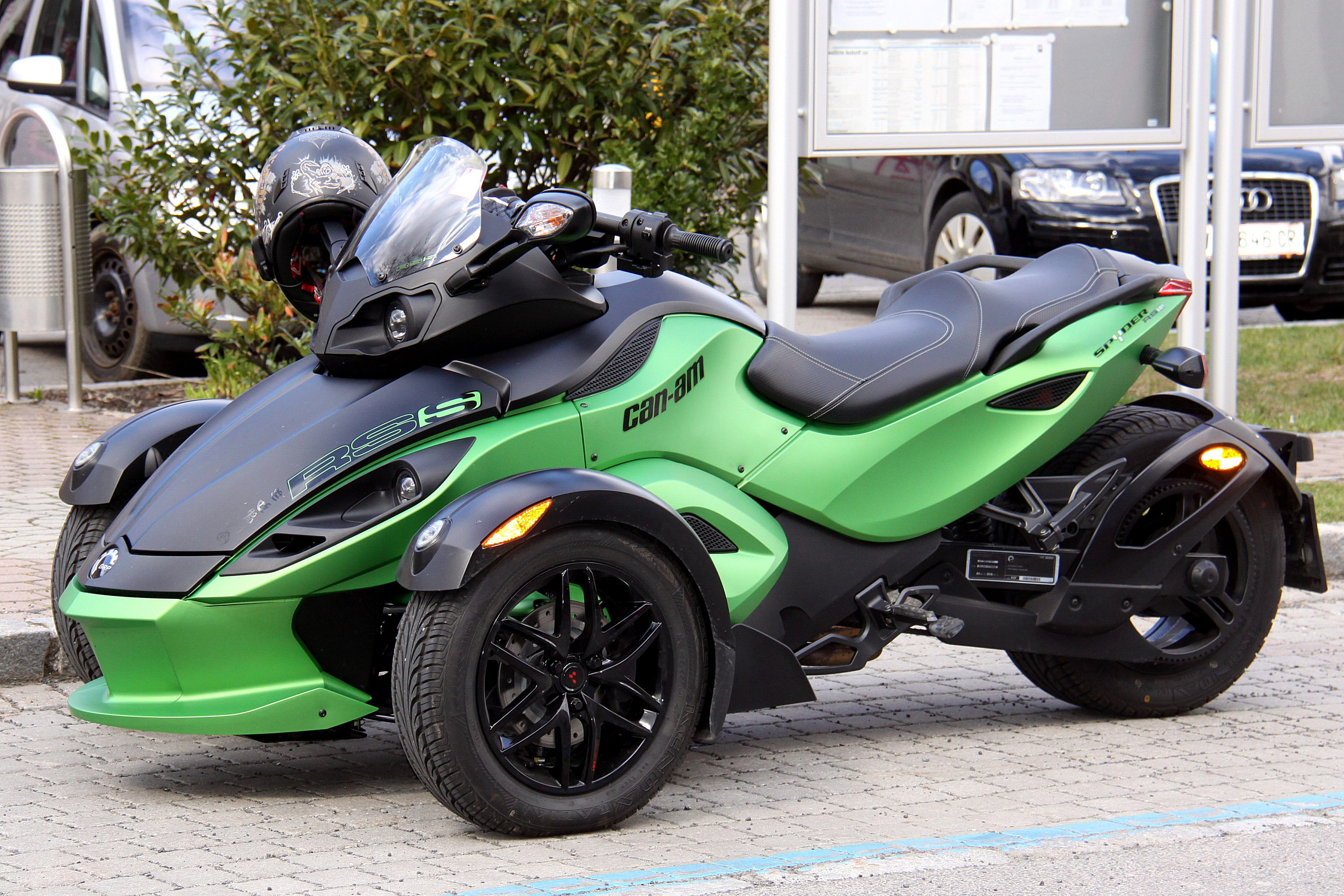
Can-Am Spyder

As of 2020, there are two models, F3 and the RT, the F3 being primarily the sport model and the RT the touring model. Additionally in 2019, Can-Am started selling a lower-cost line named the Ryker, intended for a younger entry-level demographic.

- The Can-Am Ryker series is a bare-bones, less expensive "recreational" version, with feet-forward upright seating, the lowest ground-to-seat height, and a smaller 600 or 900 cc engine. There are four trim packages available for the Ryker: the 600, the 900, the 900 Sport and the 900 Rally.
- The Spyder F3 series is a "sport-cruising" version, with feet-forward upright seating. This could be compared to a Cruiser (motorcycle), where the seating is much lower to the ground. There are several trim packages available in the F3 series, such as the base model F3, the F3-S, the F3-S (Special Series), the F3-T, and the F3-Limited).
- The Spyder RT series is a touring version, with integrated saddlebags and a top case. This could be compared to a Touring motorcycle. There are two Trim Packages in the RT Line, the base RT and the RT-Limited.

2021 BRP introduced the Spyder RT Sea to Sky trim as their top level touring model.

Discontinued models

- The Spyder RS series was a sports version, somewhat of a cross between the current F3 model and the Ryker model. The styling and seat position is more like a conventional sport bike. It was discontinued in 2016.
- The Spyder ST series was a sports-touring hybrid version, with an upright seat and removable saddlebags. This could be compared to a Sport touring motorcycle. It was discontinued in 2016.

== Government models ==
As of 2015, BRP produced specialty versions of the Spyder intended for law enforcement. The Spyder F3-P is a version of the F3 with emergency lighting, siren, and both 12v and USB power outlets, in addition to their "Quick Pursuit" ignition system. A special patrol version of the RT is also available.

== Transmissions ==
The Spyder was formerly produced in both manual and semi-automatic transmission styles. As of the 2020 model year, all Spyder models are equipped with a semi-automatic transmission and Ryker models are equipped with fully automatic continuously variable transmissions (CVT). The manual transmissions follow the standard motorcycle design: a left-foot-actuated shifter and a left-hand-actuated clutch. The semi-automatic transmission models use a paddle-shifter on the left-hand grip. The transmission is semi-automatic as it will automatically downshift as the vehicle slows, but upshifting must be manually performed by the rider (though no clutch operation is required).

== See also ==
- Microlino
- Polaris Slingshot
- Nobe GT100
- Elio Motors
- Three-wheeler
