= Helio Batista =

Helio Batista may refer to:

- Helio Batista (footballer, born 1973), Brazilian football forward
- Hélio Batista (footballer, born 1990), Brazilian football defender
