= Frankfurt western stations =

Group of three railway stations in Germany

Coordinates: 50°06′34″N 8°40′17″E

The Frankfurt western stations were a group of three stations on the western edge of the former city walls of Frankfurt am Main, Germany between the modern Willy-Brandt-Platz, then the location of Gallustor (Gallus gate) and Taunustor (Taunus gate). They were replaced by Frankfurt Hauptbahnhof in 1888.

== Stations and lines ==
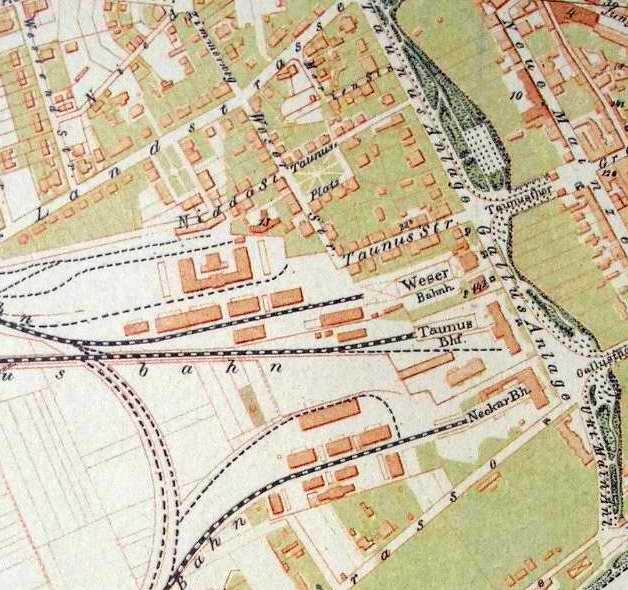
The western stations around 1860

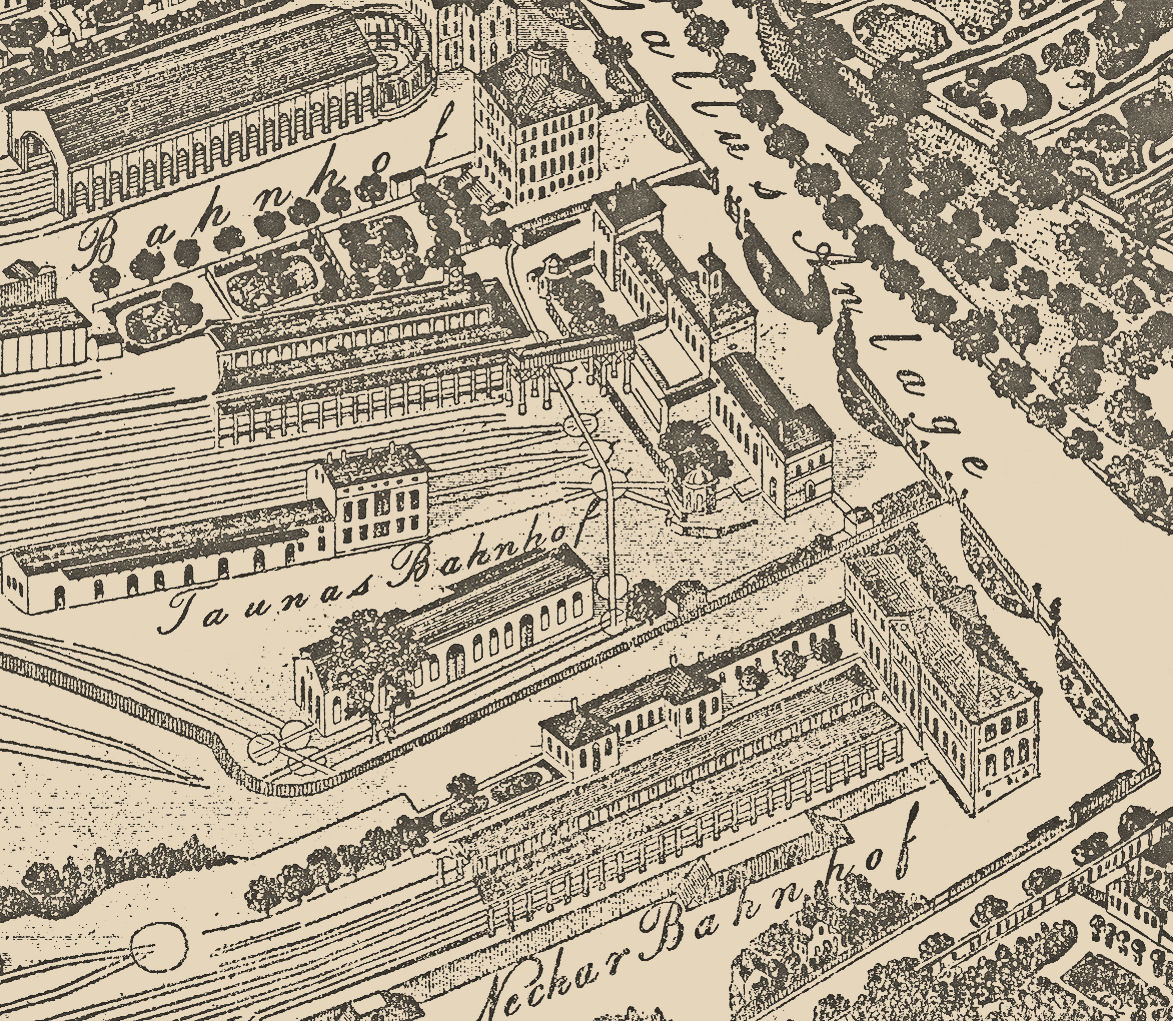
The western stations on a steel engraving by Delkeskamp, 1864

Three lines came together on the western outskirts of Frankfurt, the Taunus Railway from Wiesbaden (opened in 1839), the Main-Neckar Railway from Heidelberg (1846) and the Main-Weser Railway from Kassel (1850), then terminated at three adjacent western stations (from north to south) :

- Main-Weser station (German: Main-Weser-Bahnhof), opened in 1850,
- Taunus station (Taunusbahnhof), opened in 1839,
- Main-Neckar station (Main-Neckar-Bahnhof), opened in 1848.

Between 1846 and 1848, prior to the completion of the rail bridge over the Main, the first Main-Neckar station was just south of the Main at Mainspitze station, with trains reversing to the old Sachsenhausen station (later called Lokalbahnhof) at Sachsenhausen.

In 1888, this group of three stations was replaced by Frankfurt Hauptbahnhof, which was about half a kilometre further west. The eastern rim of the Am Hauptbahnhof square (east of the Hauptbahnhof) traces the former link line between the Main-Neckar and the Main-Weser lines.

== Current situation ==
The redundant infrastructure of the western stations was demolished. The International Electrotechnical Exhibition was built on the site. In the period up to World War I the Bahnhofsviertel district was built on the site. The former connecting lines to the western stations were converted into streets and squares. The part of the former Main-Weser line between Bockenheim station (today: Frankfurt West station) and Am Hauptbahnhof square became Bahnstraße (literally "railway street") and is now called Hamburger Allee, Friedrich-Ebert-Anlage, Platz der Republik and Dortmunder Straße. The Main-Neckar railway bridge over the Main was converted into a road bridge, then called Wilhelm bridge, now called Friedensbrücke ("Peace Bridge"). Further south the line became Stresemannallee.
