= Polaris Slingshot =

Three-wheeled car

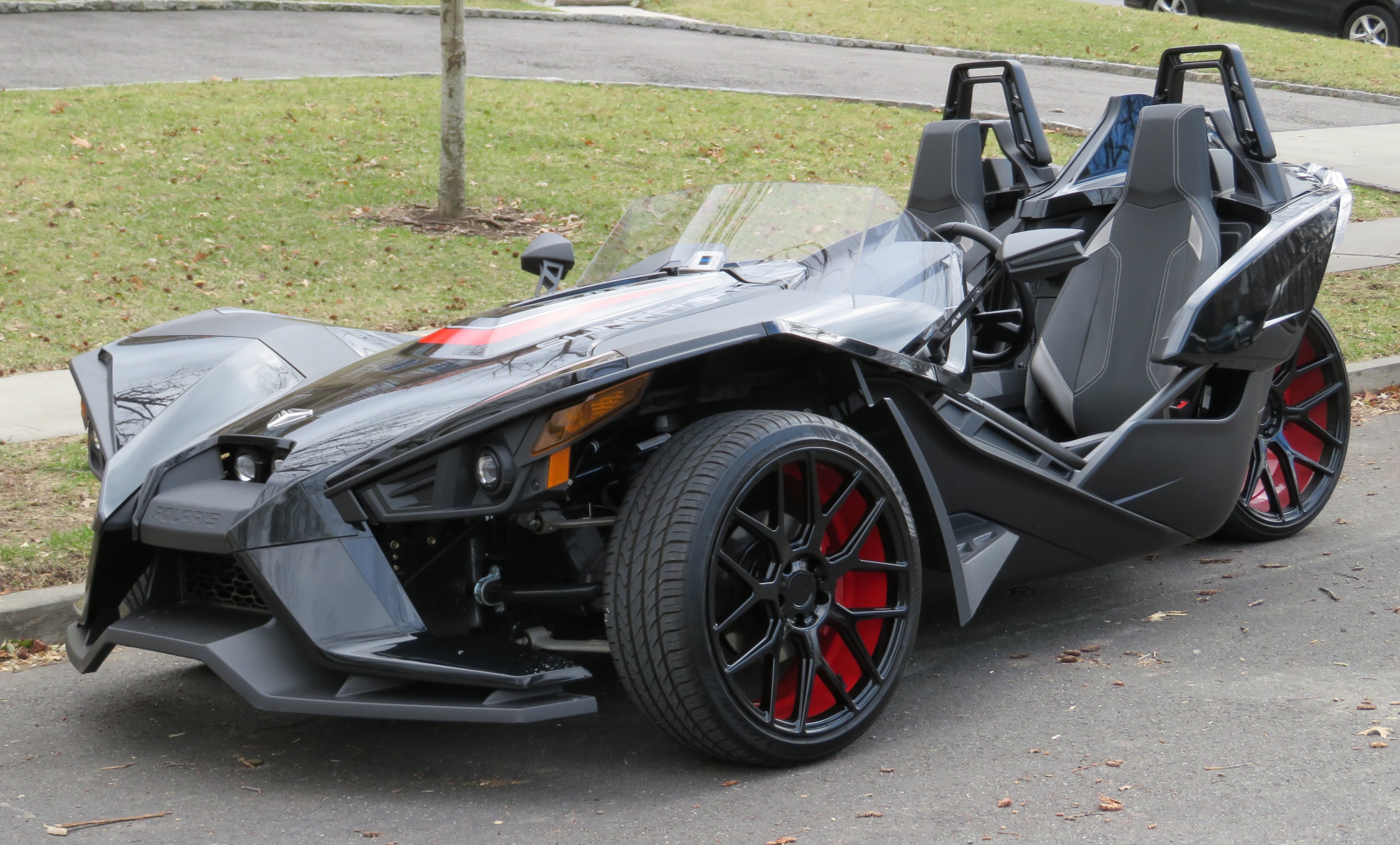

Overview
- Manufacturer: Polaris Industries
- Production: 2014–present
- Model years: 2015-Present

Body and chassis
- Layout: FR layout

Powertrain
- Engine: 2.4 liter (2,384 cc) GM Ecotec LE9 I4 (2015–2019 model years), Polaris ProStar 2.0 Liter (1997cc) DOHC I4 (2020 - present model years)
- Transmission: 5-speed Aisin AR5 manual (all model years); 5-speed AutoDrive AMT (2020–present model years)

Dimensions
- Wheelbase: 105 in (2,667 mm)
- Length: 149.6 in (3,800 mm)
- Width: 77.6 in (1,971 mm)
- Height: 51.9 in (1,320 mm)
- Curb weight: 1,651 lb (749 kg)

The Polaris Slingshot is a three-wheeler. The first edition of the model was introduced in 2014 as a 2015 model.

== Specifications ==
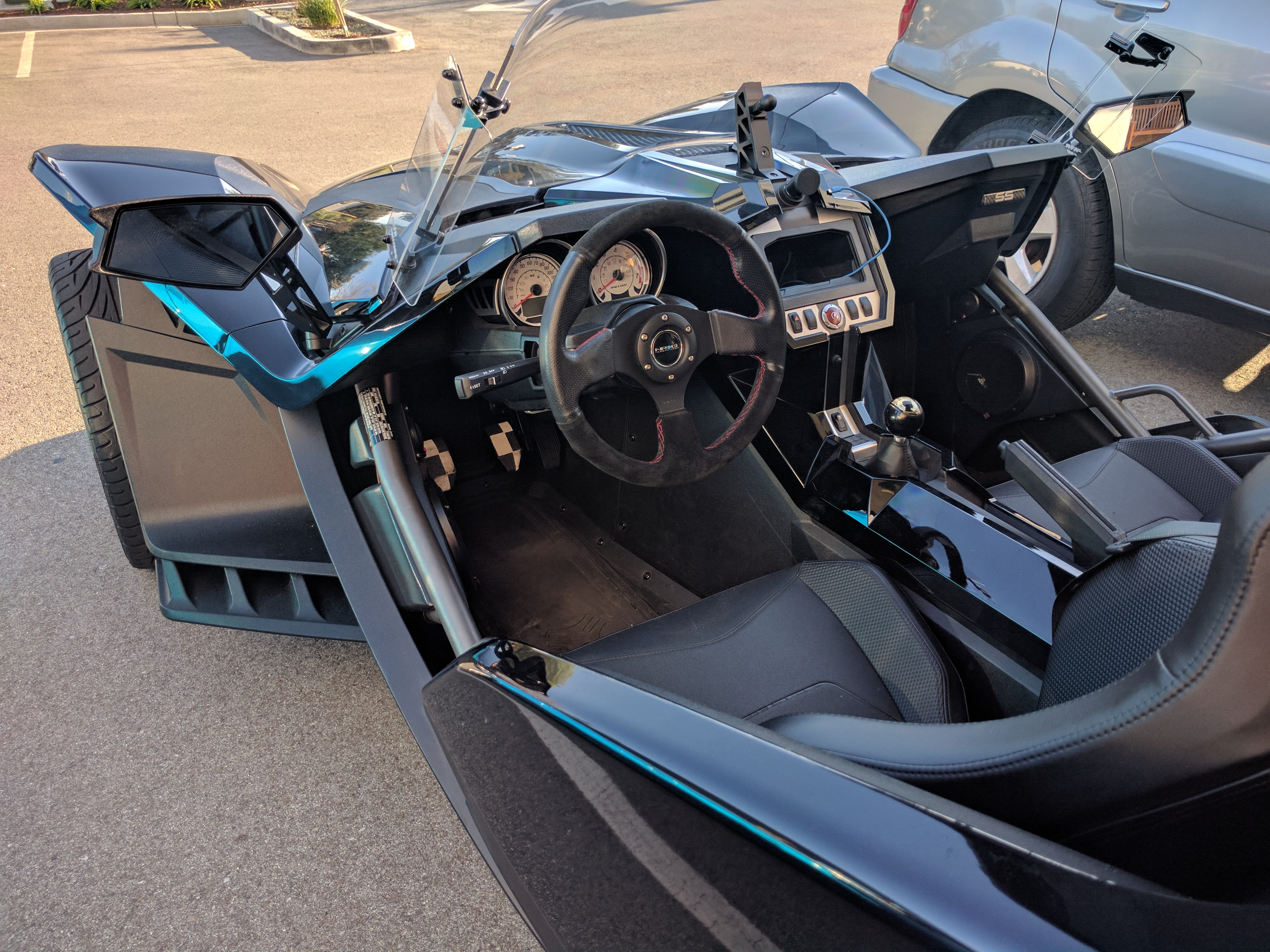
The Slingshot has a waterproof interior.

The Slingshot has a tilt-adjustable steering wheel, side-by-side bucket seats, and does not lean. It has no roof, doors, or side windows. The open interior is waterproof and can be hosed down and drained because it has drain holes in the floor.

The S and SL models include a 20x9-inch back wheel fitted with a 255mm width tire, and 18x7.5-inch front wheels with 225mm wide tires. The SLR and R models have the same front wheels and tires, but feature an upgraded 20x11-inch rear wheel fitted with a 305mm wide tire. All models have a front double wishbone suspension with an anti-roll bar. An optional five-speed automated manual transmission became available in 2020 with the release of the generation two models. A small windshield is an optional extra on the base model, and fitted as standard on the SL model. There is also an optional fiberglass wind and sun cover, which Polaris calls a "Slingshade", that features inset polycarbonate windows and snaps onto the Slingshot's tube frame, acting somewhat like a hardtop roof. The steering wheel, gear stick, and brake, clutch, and throttle pedals have a conventional automobile layout.

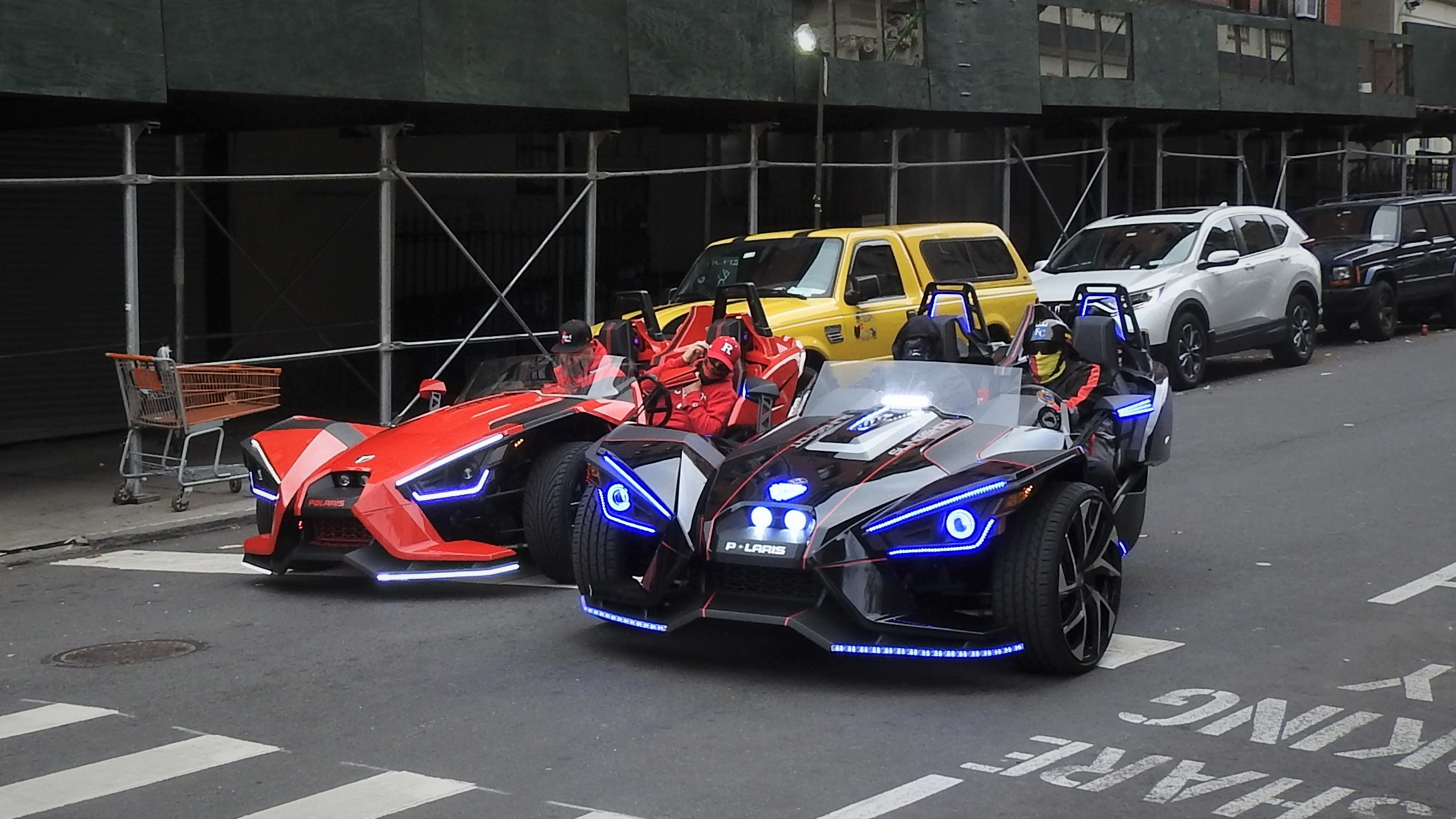
In Manhattan, New York City

== Classification ==
In the United States, depending on the jurisdiction, the Slingshot may be registered as a motorcycle or autocycle. It is classified as an autocycle in 49 states (with one state, Massachusetts, requiring a motorcycle license) as of January 2024. Three-point seat belts are fitted; however, it has no airbags or crumple zone, and in certain jurisdictions, the driver and passenger must wear motorcycle helmets.

== Performance ==
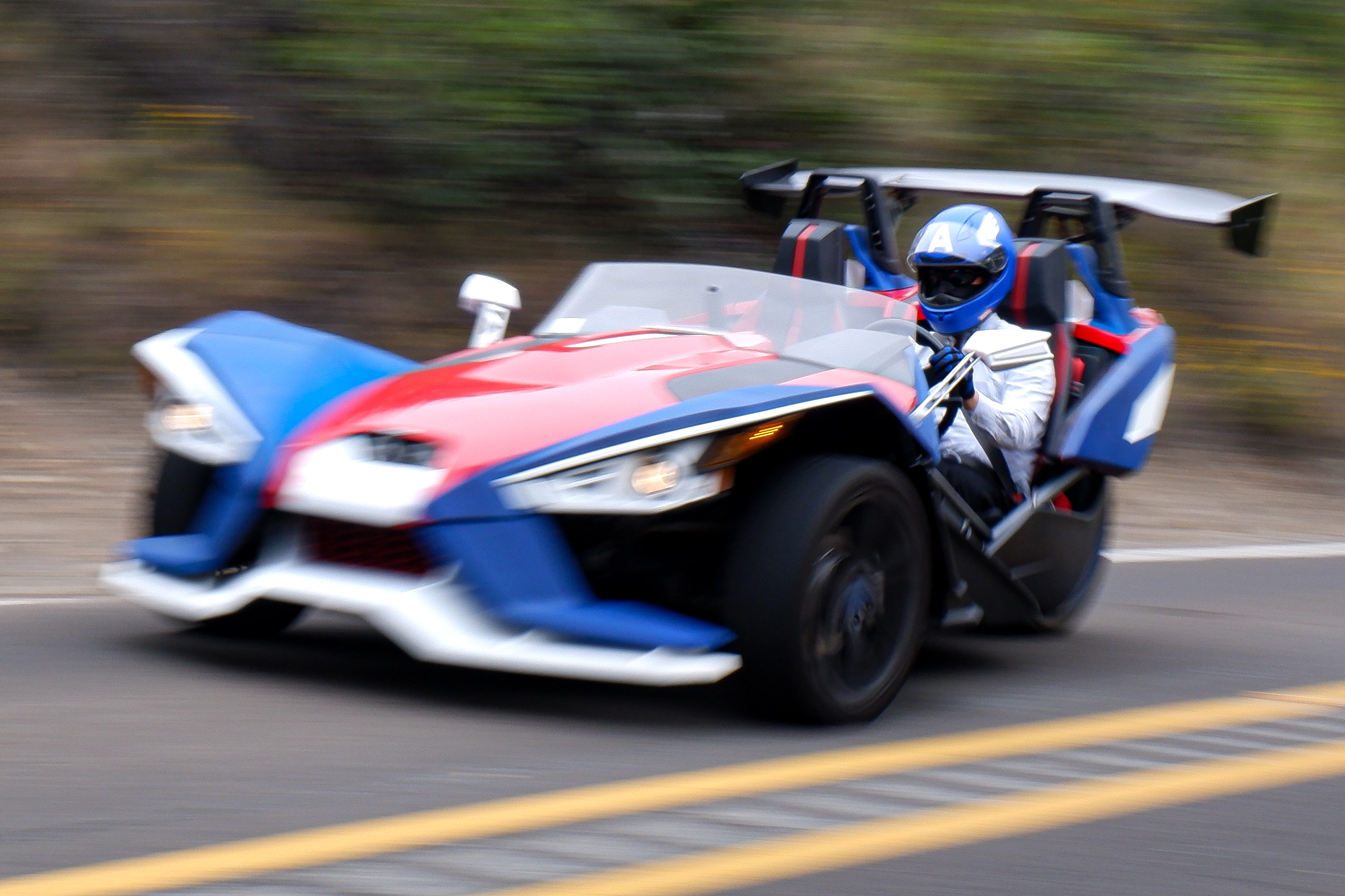
Polaris Slingshot on Live Oak Road, Orange County, CA

For the 2015 through 2019 model years, the Slingshot was powered by a GM-sourced 2.4 L Ecotec I4 that is rated at 173 hp (129 kW; 175 PS) at 6200 rpm and 166 lb⋅ft (225 N⋅m) of torque at 4700 rpm. Beginning with the 2020 model year, the Slingshot is powered by a 2.0 L inline four-cylinder gasoline-powered Polaris ProStar Engine rated at 203 hp (151 kW; 206 PS) at 8250 rpm and 144 lb⋅ft (195 N⋅m) of torque at 6500 rpm.

It can be fitted to either a conventional five-speed manual or an AutoDrive five-speed automated manual transmission, introduced in 2020, the first time an automatic transmission was made available on the Slingshot. This transmission is essentially the same standard five-speed synchromesh-equipped manual gearbox, but the clutch and shifting are hydraulically actuated and computer-controlled. The interior was also redesigned, and the exterior was updated.

== See also ==
- Campagna T-Rex, another 3-wheeled vehicle
- List of motorized trikes
- Microlino
- Nobe GT100
- Elio Motors
- Three-wheeler
