= International Electrotechnical Exhibition =

1891 trade show in Frankfurt am Main, Germany

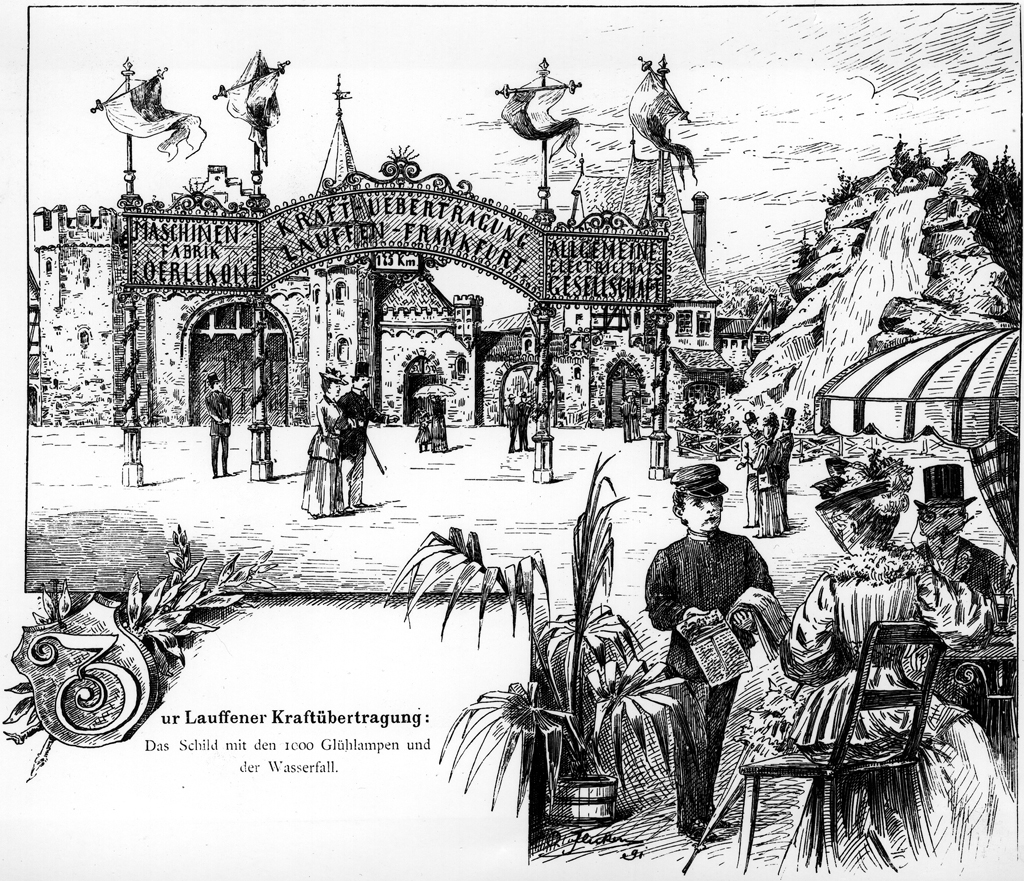
Contemporary image showing the entrance to the exhibition site with arches and electrically powered waterfall

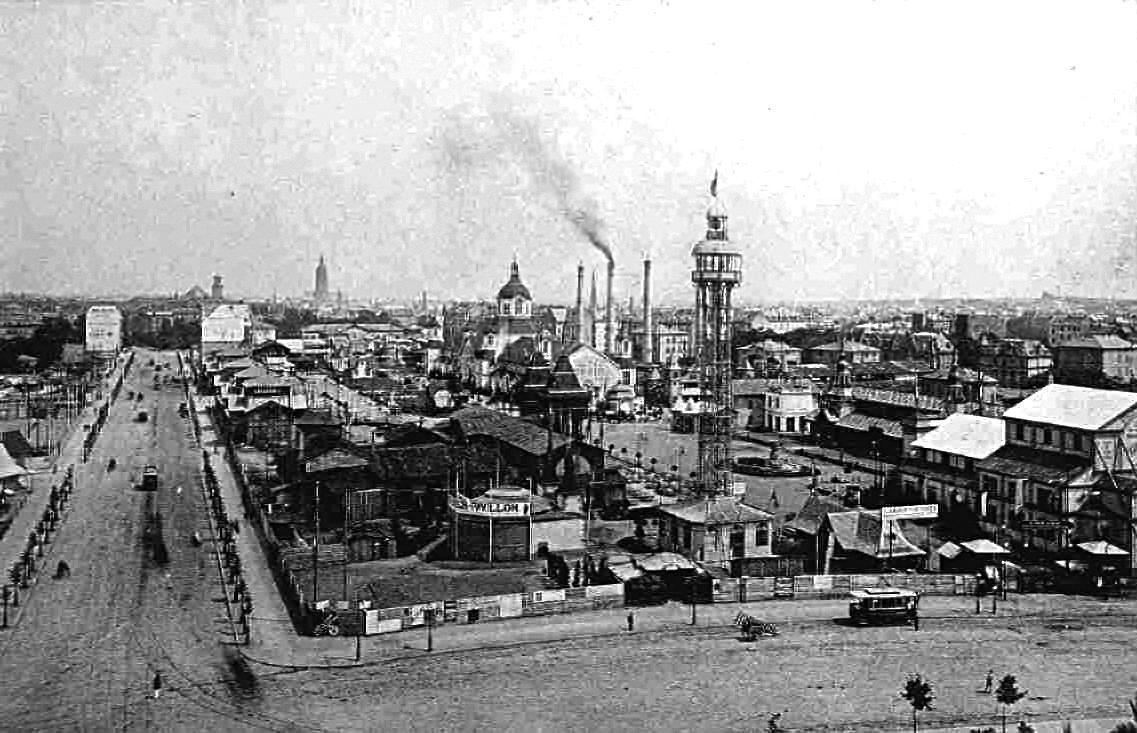
International Electrotechnical Exhibition of 1891 on the site of the former Western Railway Stations at Frankfurt am Main

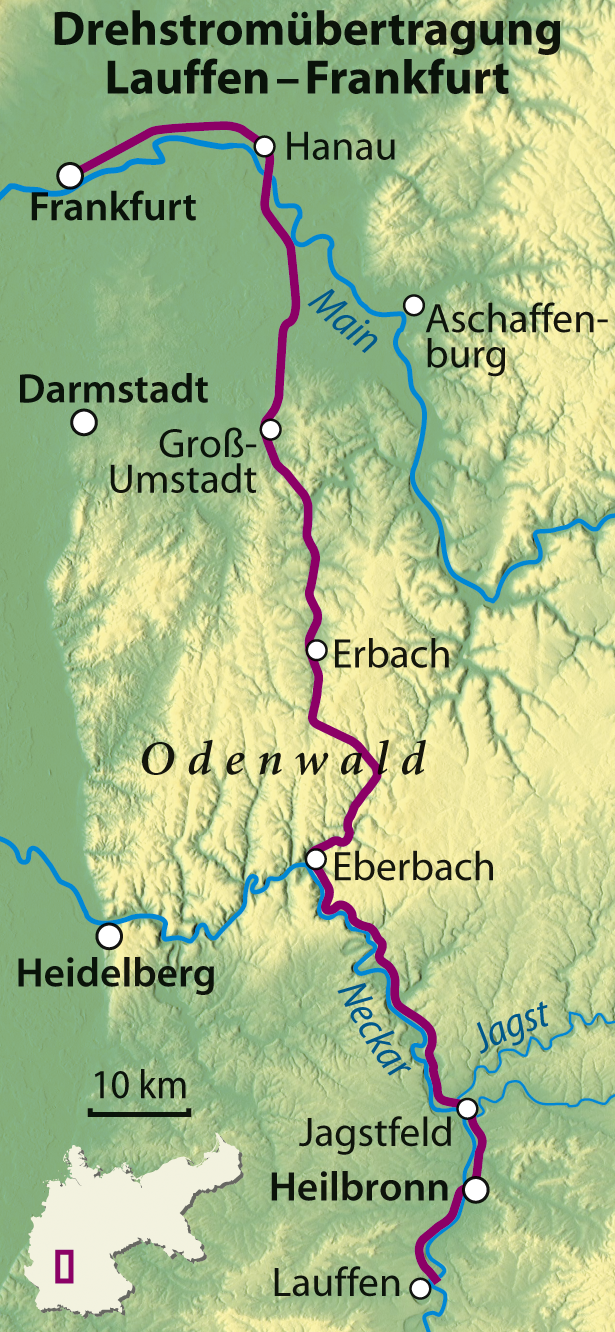
The transmission route

The 1891 International Electrotechnical Exhibition was held between 16 May and 19 October on the disused site of the three former Westbahnhöfe (Western Railway Stations) in Frankfurt am Main, Germany. The exhibition featured the first long-distance transmission of high-power, three-phase electric current, which was generated 175 km away at Lauffen am Neckar. As a result of this successful field trial, three-phase current became established for electrical transmission networks throughout the world.

== History ==
The "Elektrotechnische Gesellschaft" (Electrotechnical Society) was founded in Frankfurt in 1881 with the aim of promoting electricity and, in particular, furthering research into its application for industry and technology. Three years later, some ten manufacturers of electrical equipment had set themselves up in the city. In around 1890, some of the enterprises were established which would later become major firms in Frankfurt: Hartmann & Braun, Staudt & Voigt (from 1891 Voigt & Haefner) and W Lahmeyer & Co (from 1893 Elektrizitäts-AG, previously W Lahmeyer & Co). And it was in Frankfurt that the Second Industrial Revolution began to emerge – a revolution that would bring about fundamental changes similar to those created 100 years previously by the introduction of the steam engine to the world of work. In 1891, the German electrical industry was ready to demonstrate its capabilities to the world at the International Electrotechnical Exhibition. A site was chosen – that of the former western stations between the city and the new main station, which had been completed in 1888.

Prompted by the Paris "Exposition Universelle" (World Fair) of 1889, Leopold Sonnemann, publisher of the Frankfurter Zeitung newspaper, interested the Electrotechnical Society in the idea of an exhibition. The Society expressed an interest and started preparations in the same year. However, there was another consideration apart from the setting up of an international exhibition – Frankfurt had an urgent problem to solve. The construction of a central power station had been under discussion in the city's political and technical committees since 1886. However, agreement had still to be reached over the type of current, and opinions were divided between direct current, alternating current and three-phase current. It fell to the exhibition to demonstrate a commercially viable method for the transmission of electricity. Three-phase current with a minimal loss of 25% would be transmitted at high voltage from Lauffen am Neckar to Frankfurt. This took centre stage at the exhibition and was evidenced in the large three-section entrance gate. The central section took the form of an arch bearing the inscription "Power Transmission Lauffen–Frankfurt 175 km." Rectangular panels flanked the arch: the one to the right carrying the name of the "Allgemeine Electricitätsgesellschaft" ("AEG" – General Electricity Company), which had been founded in 1887; the left-hand panel displayed the name of the "Maschinenfabrik Oerlikon" (Oerlikon Engineering Works). The entire entrance was illuminated with 1000 light bulbs and an electrically powered waterfall provided a further attraction. With 1,200,000 visitors from all over the world, the exhibition was an out-and-out success. The cost of a one-day entry ticket for an adult amounted to a considerable 15 marks.

As far as Germany was concerned, the International Electrotechnical Exhibition settled once and for all the question of the most economical means of transmitting electrical energy. When the exhibition closed, the power station at Lauffen continued in operation – providing electricity for the administrative capital, Heilbronn, thus making it the first place to be equipped with a power supply using three-phase AC. The name of the local power company (ZEAG) bears testimony to this event. The Frankfurt city council constructed its own power station near the harbour; yet another was built by a private company in the suburb of Bockenheim.

At 09. June 2025 the transmission of electrical energy from Lauffen to Frankfurt was honored by the IEEE as "Milestone".

== Equipment ==
A hydraulic turbine at Lauffen powered a three-phase alternator with a revolving field. The alternator revolved at 150 revolutions per minute, and had a rotating field magnet with 32 poles. It was rated at 300 hp and had a terminal voltage of 55 volts. The frequency of the current was 40 Hz. Power from the alternator was stepped up to 8000 volts for transmission by oil-insulated transformers. Later tests were carried out with transmission voltage up to 25,000 volts (between phases).

The transmission line was erected with the assistance of the German Post Office and used about 60 tonnes of copper wire, 4 mm in diameter. At the exhibition, the voltage was stepped down by further oil-filled transformers and connected to motors and a motor-generator system for lamps.

Overall efficiency from turbine to load was an average of 75%, which resolved many doubts of the practicality of long-distance electric power transmission.

== Gallery ==
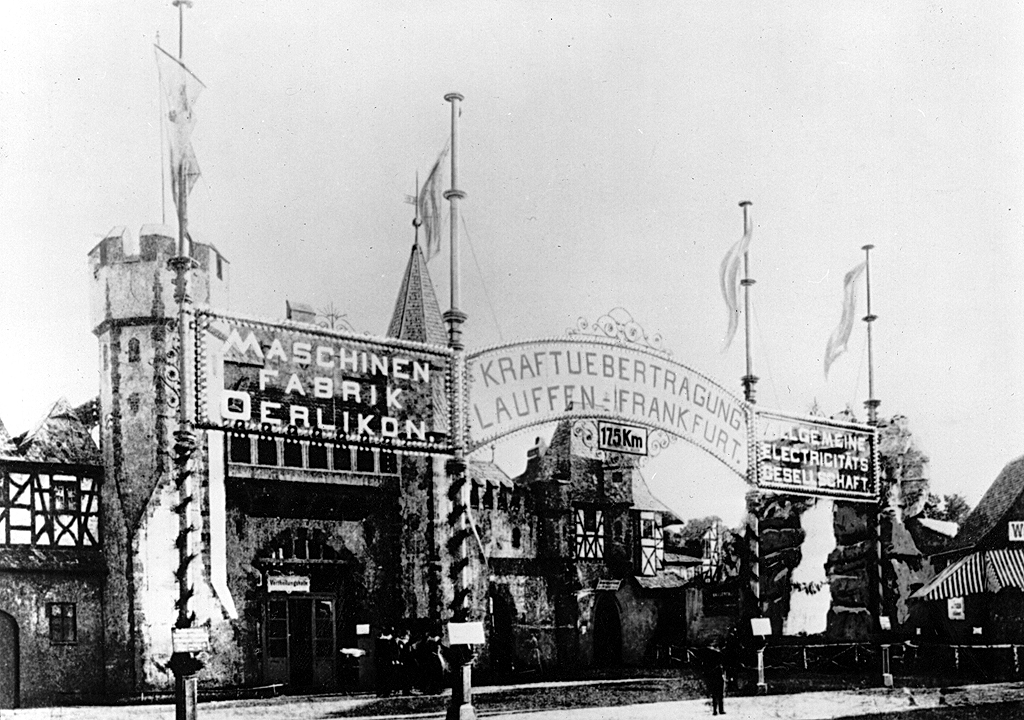
Entrance to the exhibition

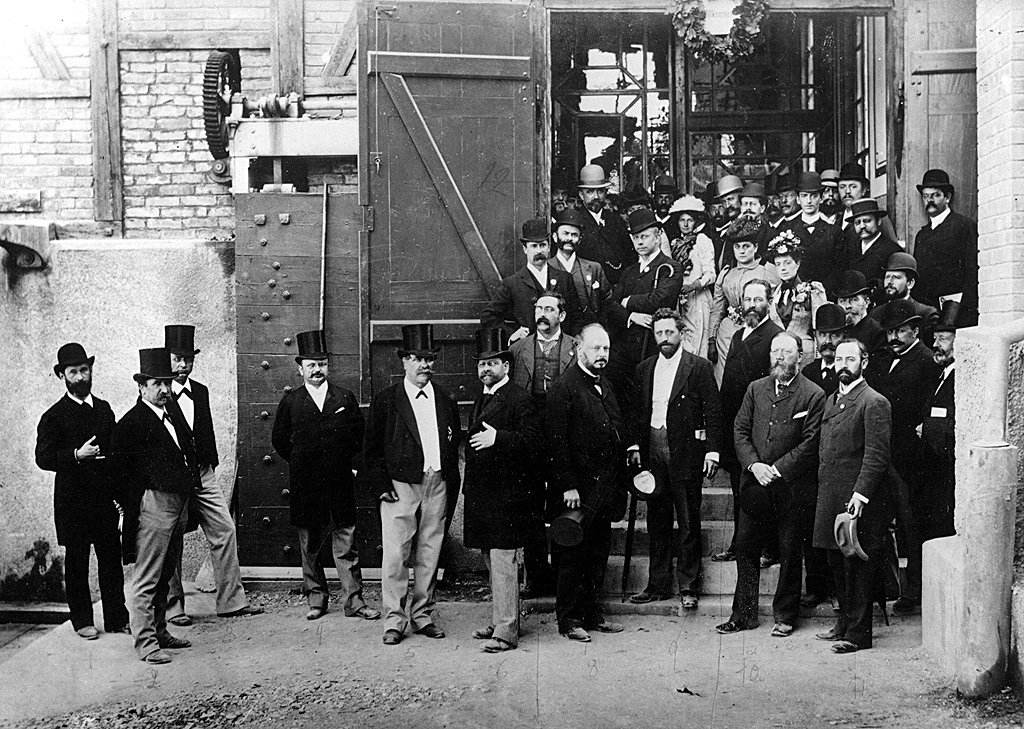
Distinguished visitors at the power station: photograph by Oskar von Miller. Among others: Karl von Leibbrand, Emil Rathenau, Marcel Deprez, Gisbert Kapp, Dr. John Hopkinson, Charles Brown, Emil Huber, and the telecommunications pioneer William Henry Preece, who would later be knighted.

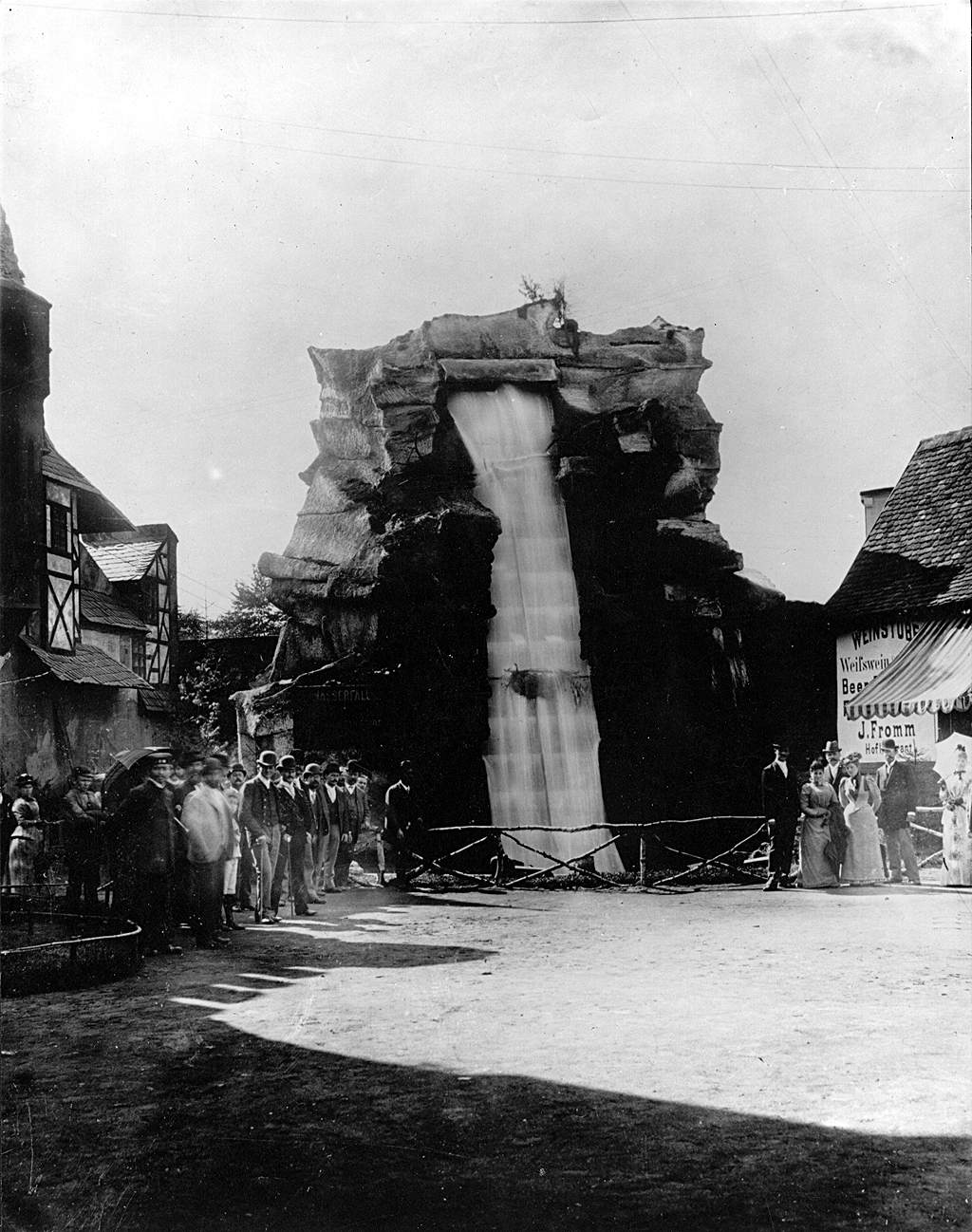
Waterfall powered by a 100 HP Pump

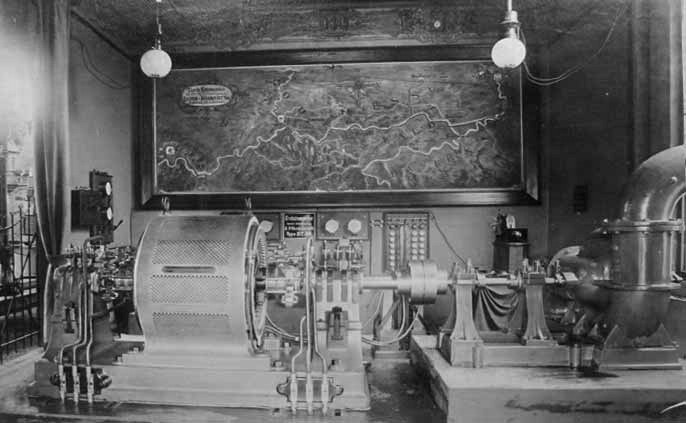
Three-phase motor with associated pump behind the artificial waterfall. The map shows the route of the overhead cable, which followed approximately that of a railway line. There were some 3,000 masts, 9,000 oil insulators and 60 tonnes of (4 mm)-diameter copper wire.

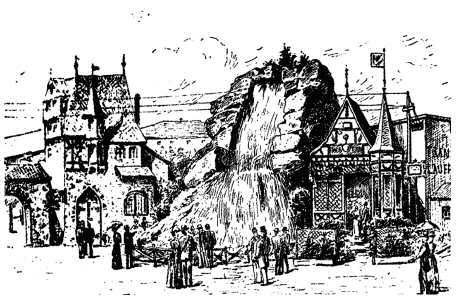
Lithograph showing the pump and transformer house behind the waterfall

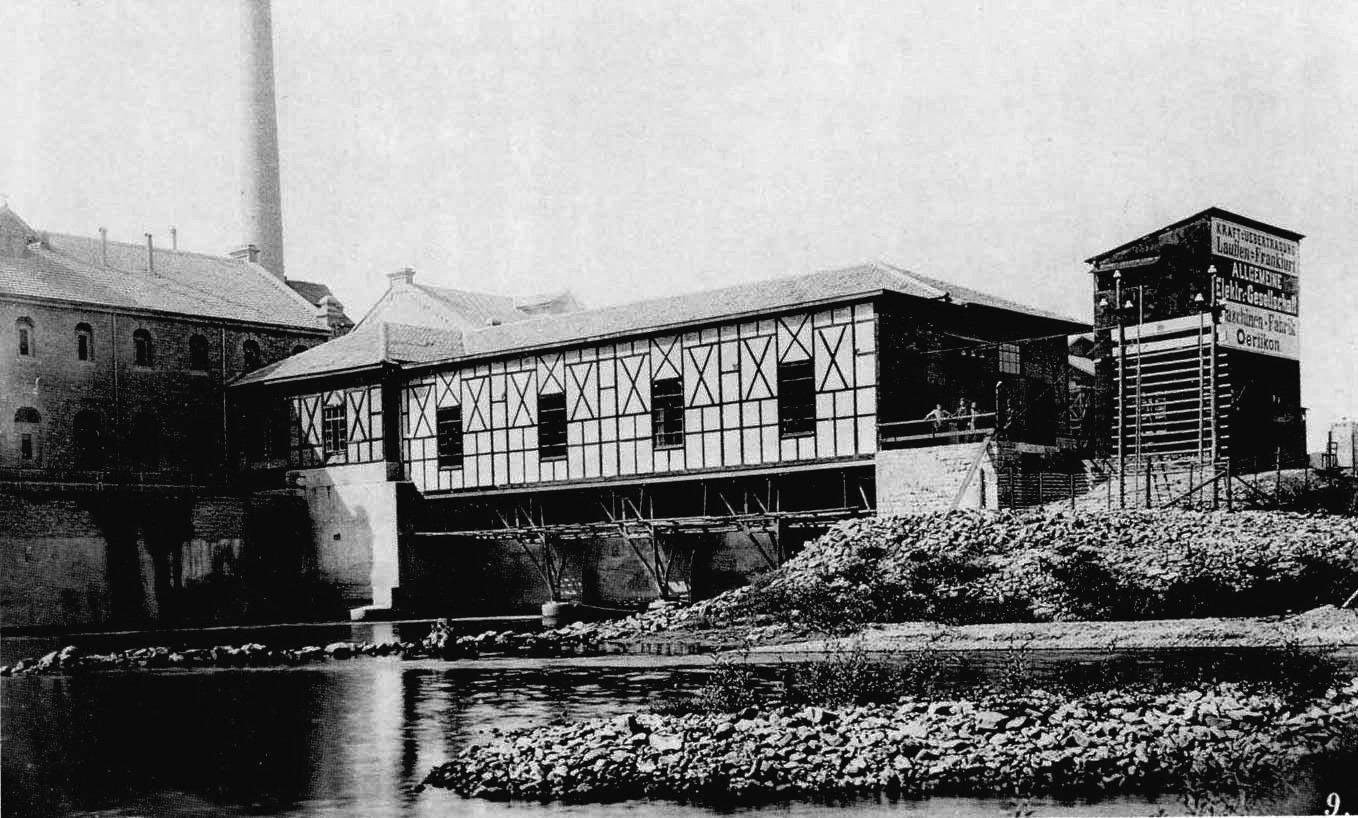
Power station at Lauffen where current was generated

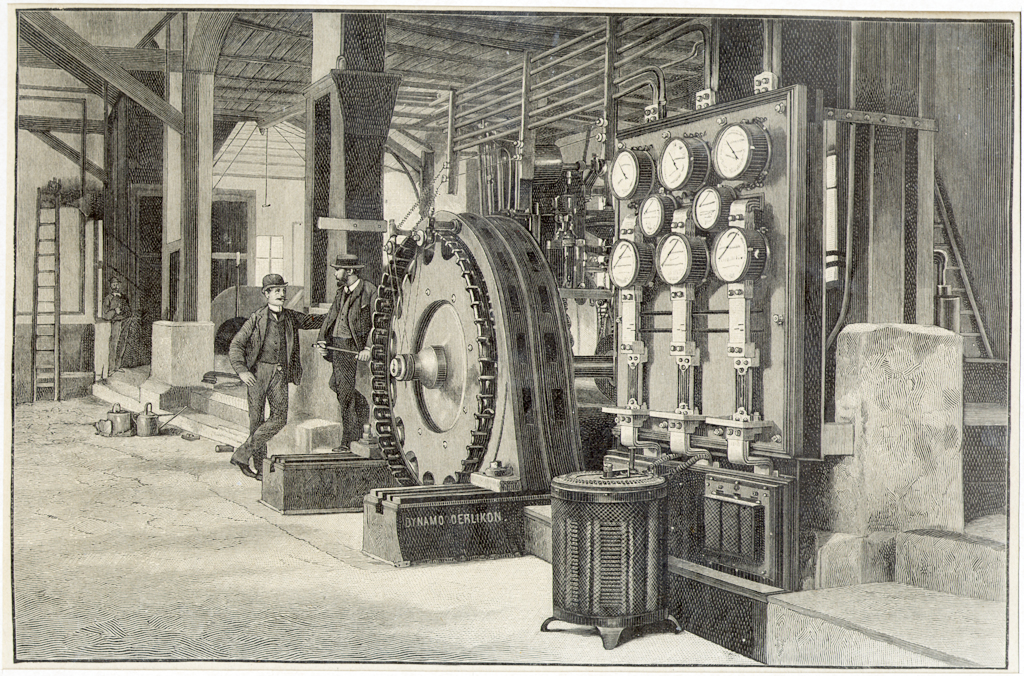
Three-phase generator at the Lauffen power station

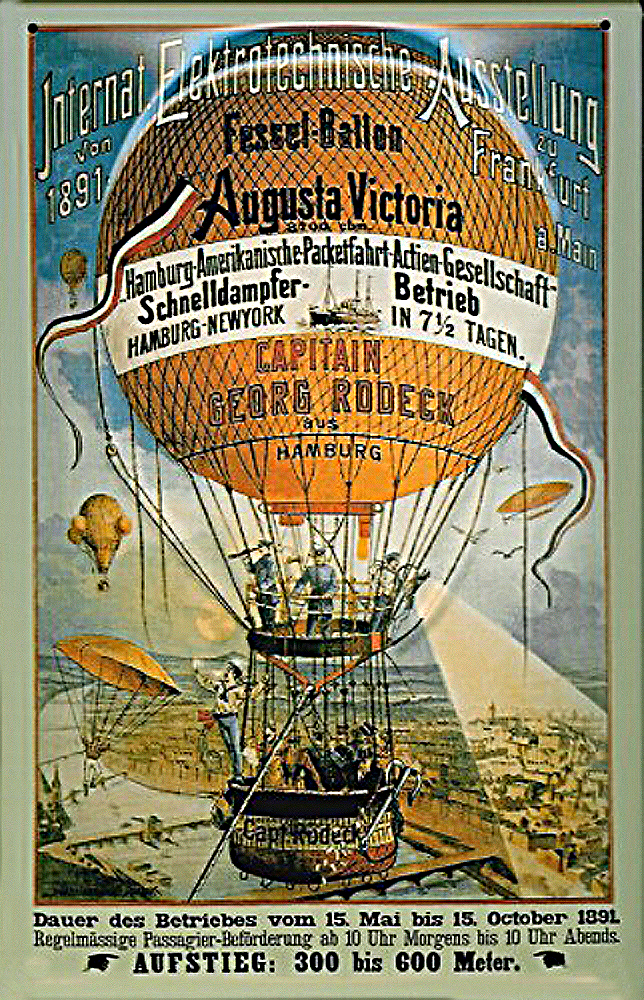
The exhibition featured the first ascents for passengers in a tethered balloon

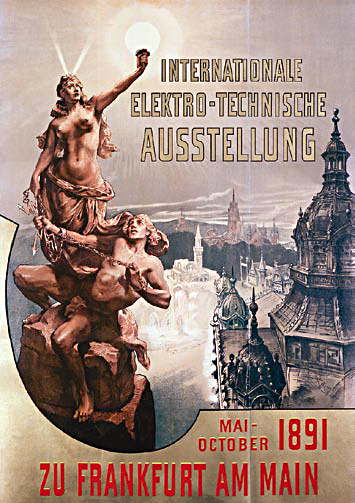
Official poster

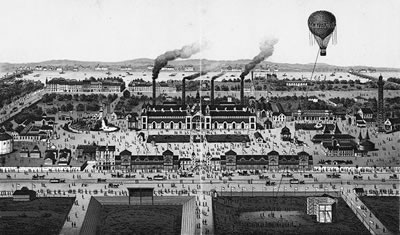
Exhibition site

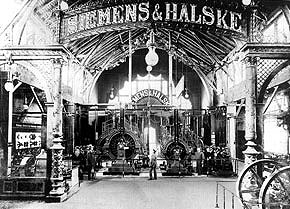
Stand of Siemens & Halske

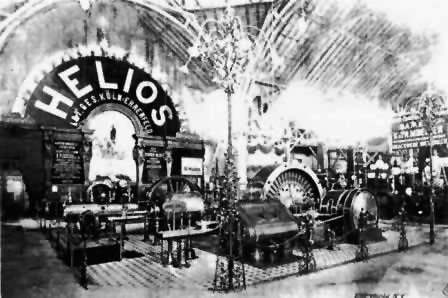
Stand of Helios AG

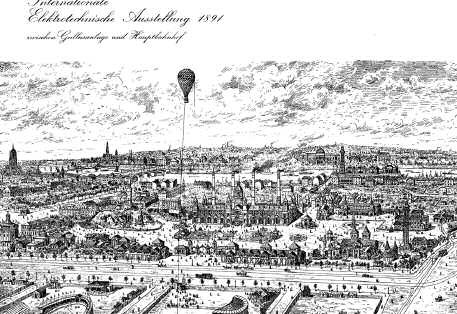
Postcard on sale for the (then) princely sum of 5 pfennigs

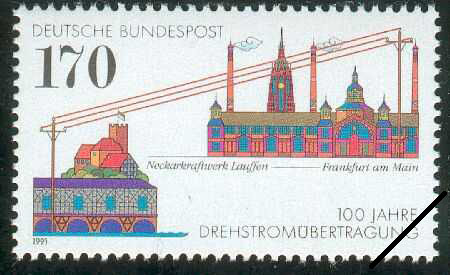
Postage stamp marking the 100th anniversary of the transmission of electricity

== See also ==
- War of the currents

== Bibliography ==
- Jürgen Steen (Hg.): "Eine neue Zeit ..!", Die Internationale Elektrotechnische Ausstellung 1891. Frankfurt am Main 1991 (Ausstellungskatalog Historisches Museum Frankfurt am Main), ISBN 3-89282-022-8
- Horst A. Wessel (Hg.): Moderne Energie für eine neue Zeit, siebtes VDE-Kolloquium am 3. und 4. September 1991 anlässlich der VDE-Jubiläumsveranstaltung "100 Jahre Drehstrom" in Frankfurt am Main (= Geschichte der Elektrotechnik, Bd.11). Berlin/Offenbach 1991, ISBN 3-8007-1813-8
- Volker Rödel: Fabrikarchitektur in Frankfurt am Main 1774–1924, Frankfurt 1986, S.30f., ISBN 3-7973-0435-8
- Sabine Hock: Mehr Licht für Frankfurt, Oskar von Miller brachte Frankfurt auf den Weg zur Elektrifizierung, Wochendienst Nr. 16 vom 26.04.2005, hg. v. Presse- und Informationsamt der Stadt Frankfurt am Main
