= Nobe GT100 =

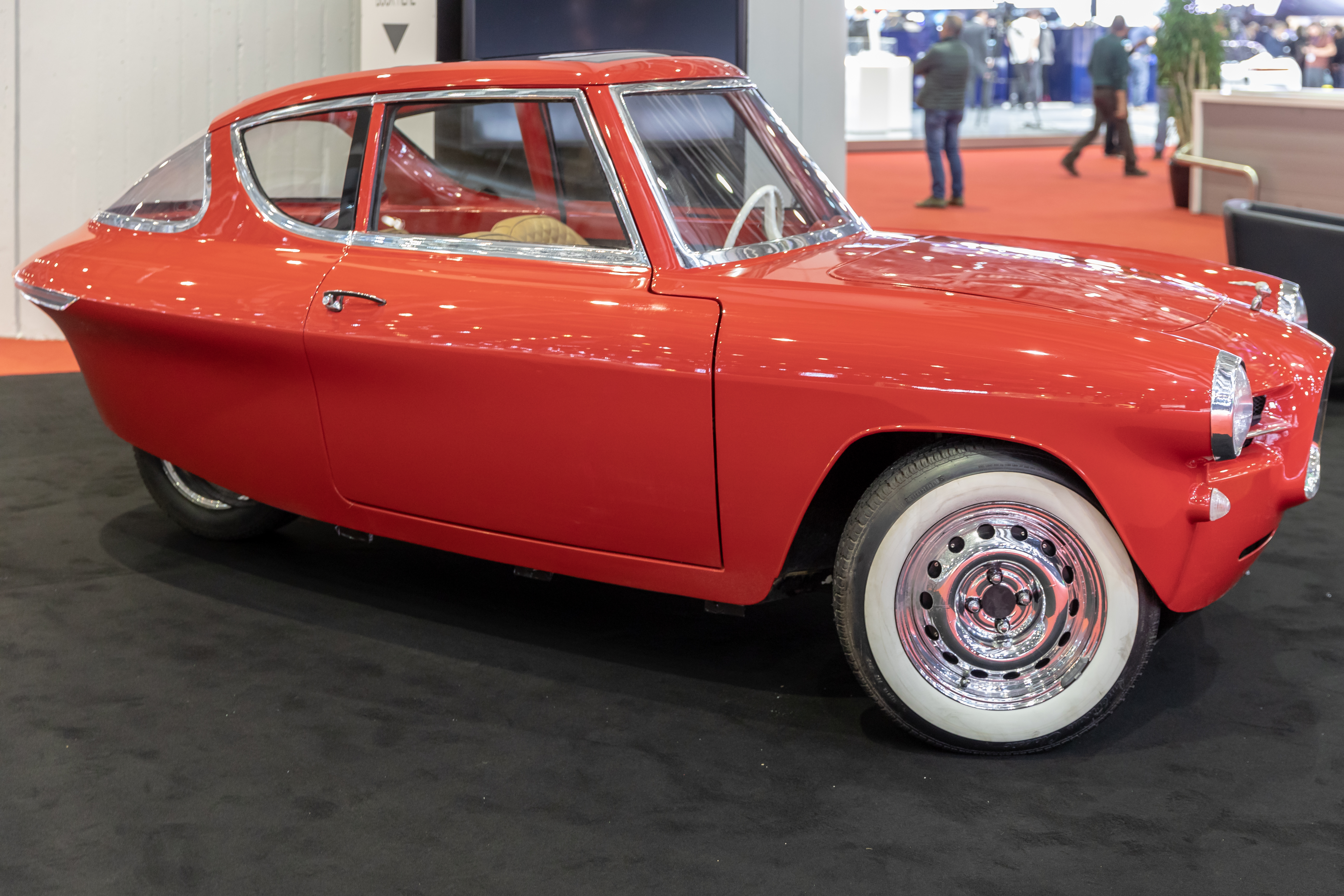
- Nobe 100 at the 2019 Geneva International Motor Show

Overview
- Manufacturer: Nobe Cars
- Production: 2 prototypes built
- Assembly: Tallinn, Estonia (SeaNest OÜ/Nobe Autotööstus; projected)
- Designer: Roman Muljar

Body and chassis
- Class: Concept car
- Body style: enclosed coupe or convertible
- Layout: battery electric vehicle; Three-wheeled, two forward; All wheel drive

Powertrain
- Engine: Electric Motor

Dimensions
- Wheelbase: 59.5 in (1.51 m)
- Length: 143.7 inches (3.65 meters)
- Width: 61.4 in (1.56 m)
- Height: 53.9 in (1.37 m)

The Nobe GT100 (pronounced no bay) is a zero emissions concept vehicle with two forward wheels and a single trailing wheel, each electrically powered. Originally designed as an enclosed two-door coupe, and subsequently rendered also as a two-door convertible, the GT100 (variously called the Nobe or Nobe 100) debuted at the 2019 Geneva Auto Show as the Nobe 01.

The Nobe was styled and promoted in Estonia by company founder Roman Muljar in 2017, with the idea production might happen in that country. After original development and two unsuccessful crowd-sourcing attempts, Nobe's Estonia workshop caught fire, destroying its two prototypes and underlying documentation, all uninsured. Developers turned to North America, where a non-running prototype was subsequently marketed by Nobe Cars USA, Inc.. The company at one time had worked with Sandy Munro and Munro & Associates to engineer the vehicle for production.

By late 2021, the companies surrounding the concept were mired in shareholder disputes and controversy. By 2022, development had stalled and the vehicle had not neared production.

== Design ==
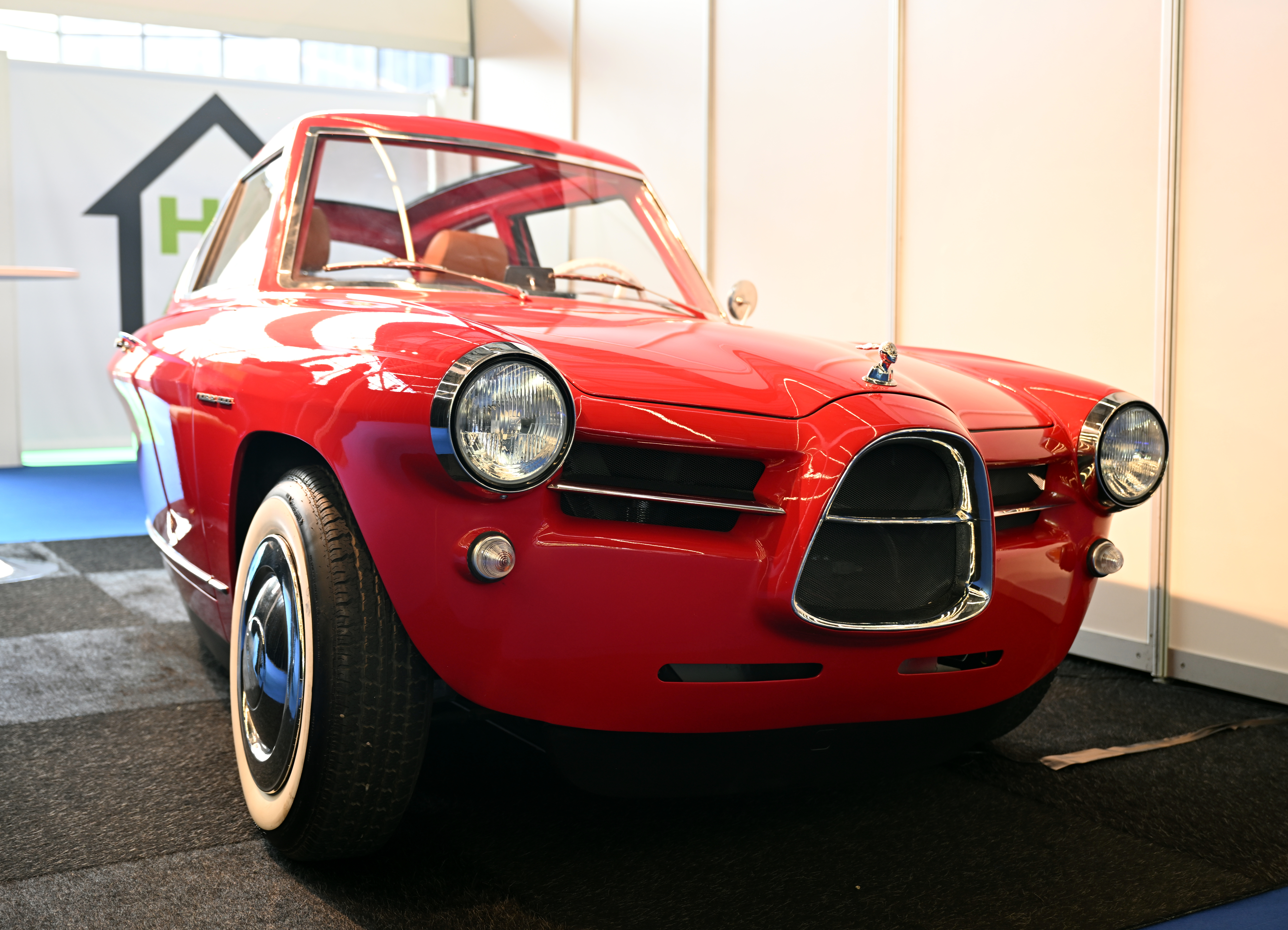
Nobe GT100 front end

The Nobe 100 was projected to weigh 1,100 lb (499 kg) and use rechargeable, portable 120v/240v batteries — for a projected driving range of 180 mi (290 km) and projected top speed of 80 mph (129 km/h).

The concept accommodated seating for two with a rear luggage area (or optional rear jump seat); front trunk; stability control; air-conditioning; fully integrated espresso machine Other illustrated features included seat-belts with integral airbags and a system marketed as Gekko, facilitated by the car's light weight, that would allow the car to be cable-winched up aluminum rails mounted to the side of a building, enabling "zero-footprint" parking.

Styling was described as "cute as hell. Like, Audrey Hepburn in white gloves cute. It's the car Edna Mode would drive." Still another said it is "classically beautiful in its treatment of lines and motion – the Nobe looks downright breathtaking."

== Classification ==
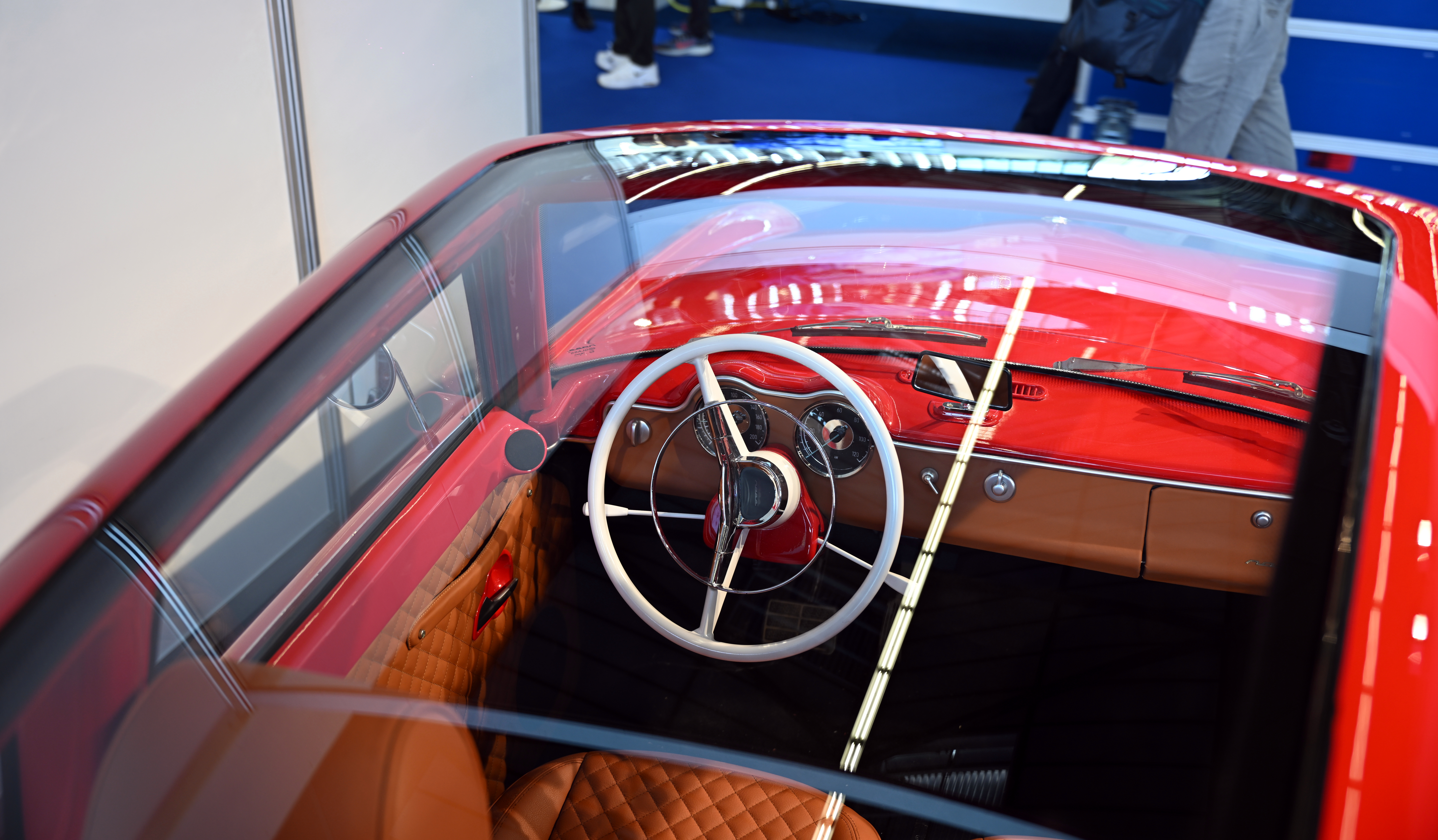
View of the interior through the roof

The three-wheeler was marketed as off-road capable and would be classified in the United States as an autocycle, a regulatory class of three-wheeled vehicles requiring only a regular driver's license and exempt from federal automotive safety provisions when equipped with a steering wheel rather than handlebars, two side by side seats and seat belts (but not airbags). As of 2020, the classification existed in 48 states.

== Controversy ==
Nobe Cars has had two failed crowdsourcing campaigns on Indiegogo and FundedByMe, both of which were only able to achieve about 15% of their goal. As of 2022, Nobe Cars USA, Inc. markets the company via their website, www.nobecars.com.

Controversy surfaced regarding the automaker when an investigative report on the Estonian news program Pealtnägija on the ERR network investigated and found criminal charges and past bankruptcies associated with the CEO, Roman Muljar, in addition to complaints by shareholders about his ability to run a business and misappropriation of funds. Video from the report was later released with English subtitles.

Allegations of assault against Nobe CEO Roman Muljar, along with accusations of poaching and investment theft, were made by an EV investor, who also reported to police being threatened with a glass bottle by Muljar at the Fully Charged EV show in Farnborough, UK in May 2022.

A group referring to itself only as nobecarsinvestors.com pointed to many problems with the company, offering comparisons to the Dale and Elio cars and to Nikola Motors. The group raises serious questions about "the nature and timing of the fire that destroyed" Nobe's factory in October 2019, and questioned how "a move to another facility was in the works before the fire even started." In multiple articles, the Estonian media note that the company was in severe financial distress at the time of the fire, while the investor group questions how a company that could not even pay a €1,700 tax bill, and claims to have neglected to get insurance, somehow had the finances to have a new factory completed just two months after the fire.

== See also ==
- Microlino
- Polaris Slingshot
- Elio Motors
- Three-wheeler
- Twentieth Century Motor Car Corporation
