= Helio Batista (footballer, born 1973) =

Brazilian footballer

Personal information
- Full name: Helio Batista dos Santos Junior
- Date of birth: 20 February 1973 (age 53)
- Height: 1.82 m (5 ft 11 1/2 in)
- Position: Forward

Senior career*
Years	Team	Apps	(Gls)
1994	Bragantino	2	(0)
1999	FC Alania Vladikavkaz	14	(1)
- * Club domestic league appearances and goals

Helio Batista dos Santos Junior (born 20 February 1973), or simply Helio Batista, is a former Brazilian football player.
