= Elio Motors =

Defunct American automotive company

- Type: Public
- Traded as: Expert Market: ELIO
- Industry: Automobile
- Founded: 2009
- Founder: Paul Elio
- Defunct: 2024
- Headquarters: Phoenix, Arizona, United States
- Number of locations: 3 Shreveport, Louisiana; Livonia, Michigan; Phoenix, Arizona
- Area served: United States
- Key people: Paul Elio, founder and CEO; James Holden, Board Member; David C. Schembri, Board Member; Kenneth L. Way, Board Member; Stuart Lichter, Board Member; Hari Iyer, Board Member
- Products: Three-wheel motor vehicles
- Owner: Paul Elio
- Website: eliomotors.com

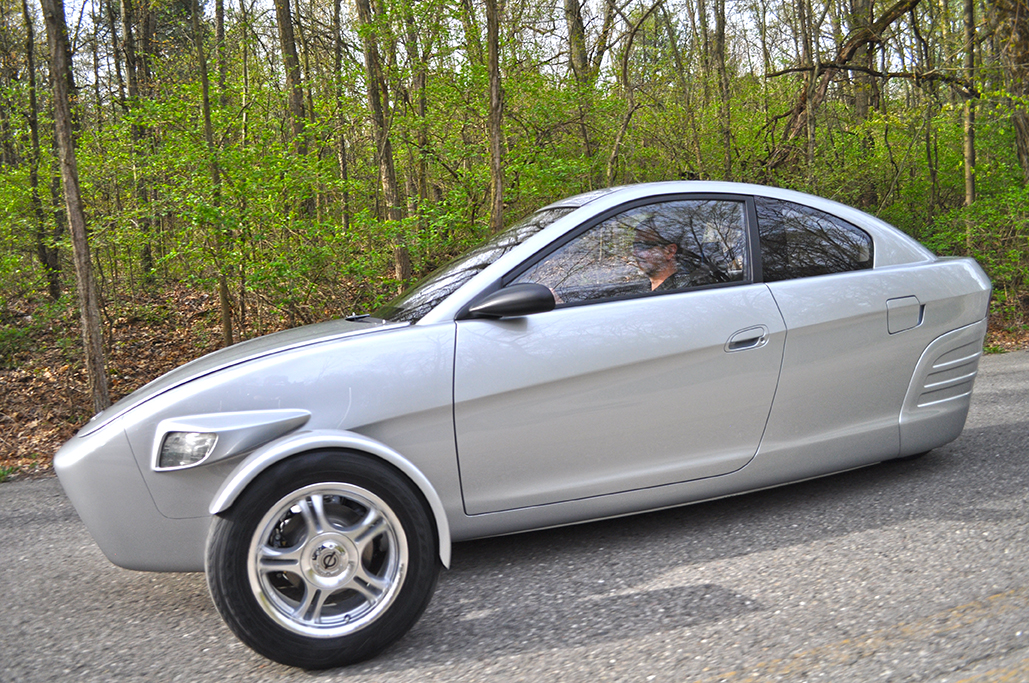
Side view of 3rd generation Elio prototype

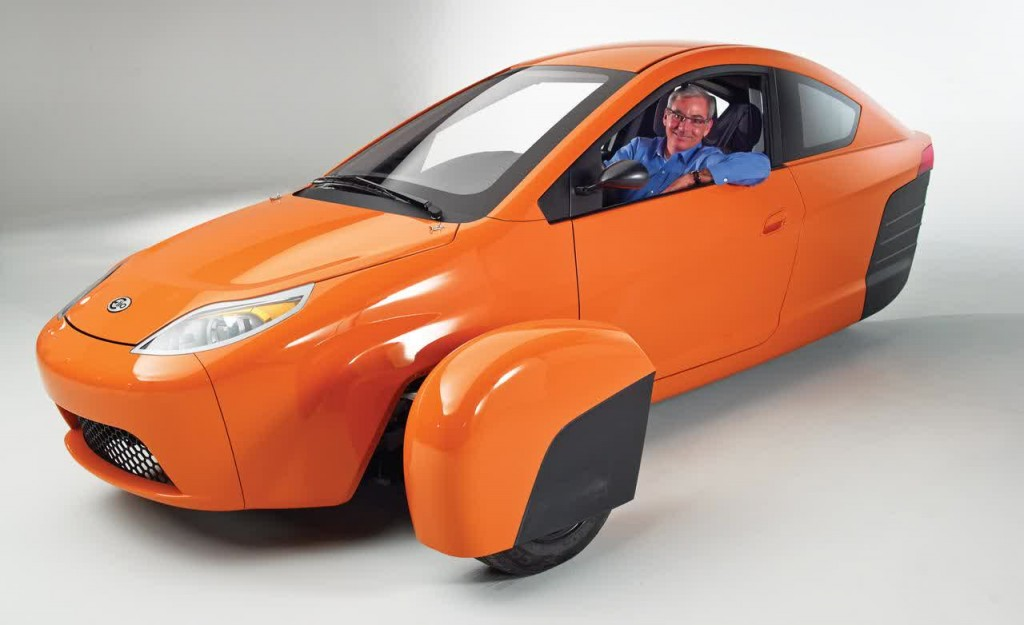
Paul Elio sitting in the P4 prototype of an Elio.

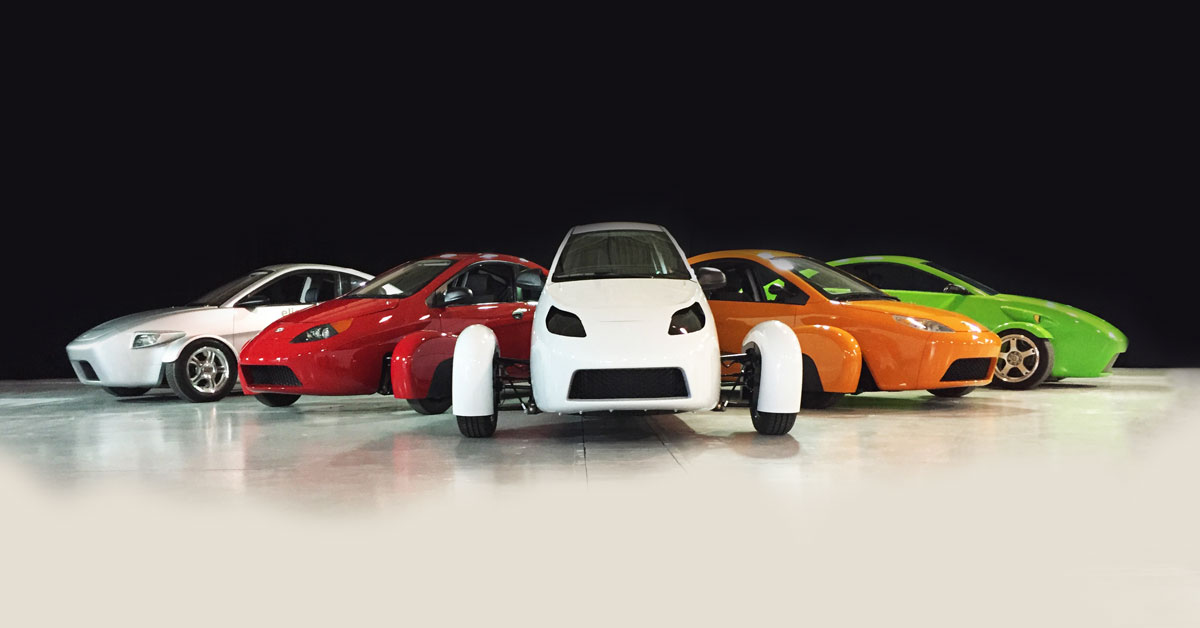
Elio Motors Prototypes with the first of the E-Series vehicles

Elio Motors was a company founded by Paul Elio in 2009, to design and manufacture a three-wheeled, enclosed autocycle. Elio collected deposits from customers of more than US$28 million during 2013–2018, then went silent for three years before filing with the Securities and Exchange Commission in September 2021 that there was "substantial doubt about its ability to stay afloat."

Since 2009 concept, the company illustrated and repeatedly delayed a release date for its original gasoline-powered vehicle, and pivoted to an electric-powered concept in 2021.

As early as 2015, The New York Times noted Elio Motors was selling "spots on the waiting list — and, more broadly, a dream." Elio was fined $7.5 million for failing to create promised jobs in Louisiana — and as of May 2022 had not neared production. By 2024, the company website became inactive.

== Concept ==
Based on a host of speculative forward-looking statements, the company's petrol-powered three-wheel concept was marketed as the Elio P4; was illustrated to attain a highway mileage rating of up to 84 mpg and was to offer power windows, a power door lock, cruise control, and air conditioning, in an aerodynamic, enclosed bodywork. The design idea included multiple air bags, anti-lock brakes, traction control, steel unibody frame, and crumple zones and a three-wheeled autocycle configuration with two wheels in front, one in back. Advertisements in 2017 illustrated a base price target of $7,450 for the gas motor version and suggested to achieve up to 84 mpg-US (2.8 L/100 km) on the highway and up to 49 in the city.

As of June 2017, basic test mules and three validation vehicles (codenamed: E1-A, E1-C, and E1-D) were built to test safety, aerodynamics, and durability. Even though the E1-C is not used for testing, it was the most up-to-date interior with a cosmetically evolved engine. Elio claimed the autocycle could be produced using 80% soft-tooling. Elio's marketing suggested that 100 pre-production fleet vehicles could be built at its Shreveport, Louisiana manufacturing facility if additional funds are secured. By 2018, nearly all funds had been depleted, with nearly US$50 million in outstanding debt, and a projected US$376 million required to reach production.

The vehicle's design was illustrated to include air conditioning and heating (projected to be manufactured by RedDOT), AM/FM stereo, power windows/door lock, cruise control, three airbags, a reinforced steel roll cage, side intrusion beams, stability control, and disc brakes with ABS. Continental AG has designed a tire specifically for the Elio.

Elio designs were purported to meet motorcycle standards as a three-wheeled autocycle, within the U.S. government's motorcycle classification. The company lobbied in most states, to alter regulations that would otherwise require drivers to wear a helmet and, in many states to remove the requirement for operators to have a motorcycle endorsement on their driver license.

The design targeted a curb weight of 1,350 lb (610 kg); three-wheel anti-lock disc brakes; an inline 0.9-liter three cylinder (designed especially for Elio by IAV), 55 horsepower (41 kW) engine; and front-wheel drive, with a top speed of 107 mph (172 km/h) and an acceleration of 0 to 60 mph (0 to 97 km/h) in approximately 10.8 seconds. The vehicle design has an overall length of 160.5 inches (4.08 m) and an overall height of 54.2 inches (1.38 m). The front track is designed to be 66.8 inches (1.70 m) with a wheelbase of 110 inches (2.8 m). The trunk space is designed to be 27 × 14 × 10 inches, enough for one airline carry-on bag or golf bag with the rear seat folded down (47+ inches).

In September 2021, Elio Motors announced that a new electric motor design was the company's focus, to be later followed by a gas motor option. The projections, which did not include range, cited a possible $15,000 price.

== Illustrated production ==
Elio Motors is based in Phoenix, Arizona, and projected in 2017 that manufacturing could take place at a facility in Shreveport, Louisiana, using a portion of the former General Motors 3.2 million-square-foot plant. Production would have employed upwards of 1,500 people at the Shreveport facility plus an additional 1,500 at the supply base, but will not be occurring. In addition, Elio Motors projected that 90% of parts for its vehicle could originate in North America.

The idea of 100 pre-production fleet vehicles was teased in December 2016, however social media replies on Nov 1, 2017, from Elio Motors said, "We are targeting the start of production in 2019". The potential service provider for Elio Motors is Pep Boys. The company started accepting customer reservations on its website in January 2013 and stopped accepting reservations at 65,341 in 2017. On August 3, 2017, Elio filed with the U.S. Securities and Exchange Commission to have an initial public offering (IPO) for its common stock in order to raise $100 million in capital. In the filing, it said that their vehicle would not be capable of production until approximately 76 weeks after securing enough funding to begin.

== Criticism ==
Elio Motors had continuously delayed the release date, which was originally in 2012. Since then, the date has been pushed back each year. In December 2016, the date was announced to have moved to 2018, and on Nov 1, 2017 in a Facebook reply, Elio Motors mentioned the start of production aimed for 2019. These dates made automotive analysts question the company's ability to bring a product to market. Critics have drawn comparisons to the Lit Motors C-1 and Aptera Motors, which had similar production schemes requiring more funding than was attainable, while updating production timelines to give the impression that a product was deliverable. In an effort to secure a Department of Energy loan, Elio offered advance reservations where the buyer can reserve a spot in line to possibly purchase a vehicle for a base price of US$7,450.

By the end of 2017, Elio had only US$7,155 in the bank, and deficits of US$49,674,327. Elio's own estimate was that an investment of US$376,600,000 plus an additional US$110,500,000 in reservation deposits would be necessary in order to go into production. Throughout 2018 and beyond, reservation deposits remained closed, and there was no concrete plan in place to raise the nearly half-billion dollars to proceed. Despite a lack of transparency as to their path forward, Elio announced a December 2019 production date, which passed with no progress.

In January 2019, Elio stated: "The production date is estimated to be 76 weeks from the timely and successful completion of our current and subsequent fundraising efforts. The timing and availability of the funds can move and we will do everything we can to keep the project moving forward by utilizing each piece of funding received, as we receive it."

This lack of an actual product over a near-decade long span caused critics in 2013 to call their car vaporware.

The Elio web site blog and press release areas were not updated between December 2019 and September 9, 2021, when a redesigned website emerged and announced the company's intention to produce an electric motor version of their three-wheeled vehicle at double the cost. The Elio Motors Facebook page was similarly left without updates between April 2019 and September 9, 2021. Neither the blog nor the Facebook page were being updated in the nearly two years period. In January 2024 the website disappeared and attempts to access it were met with a "404 Not Found" error page, which shortly afterwards was replaced with a page which said "eliomotors.com has expired and is parked free, courtesy of GoDaddy.com". In February 2024 the domain was put up for sale on GoDaddy Auctions. The auction attracted bids of several thousand dollars, but by the beginning of April 2024 the Elio Motors website was available again at eliomotors.com. By 2025, however, the website was mostly empty and inactive, returning 403, 404, and Access Denied errors from all links on the virtually empty homepage. As of June 2026, the website now appears to be owned by an online European casino with no reference to Elio Motors aside from the url.

== See also ==
- Nobe GT100
- Microlino
- William Garrison (geographer) – studied concept of narrow vehicles
- List of motorized trikes
- Three-wheeler
- Twentieth Century Motor Car Corporation
