= Bond Cars =

British automobile manufacturer

Sharps Commercials Ltd/Bond Cars Ltd
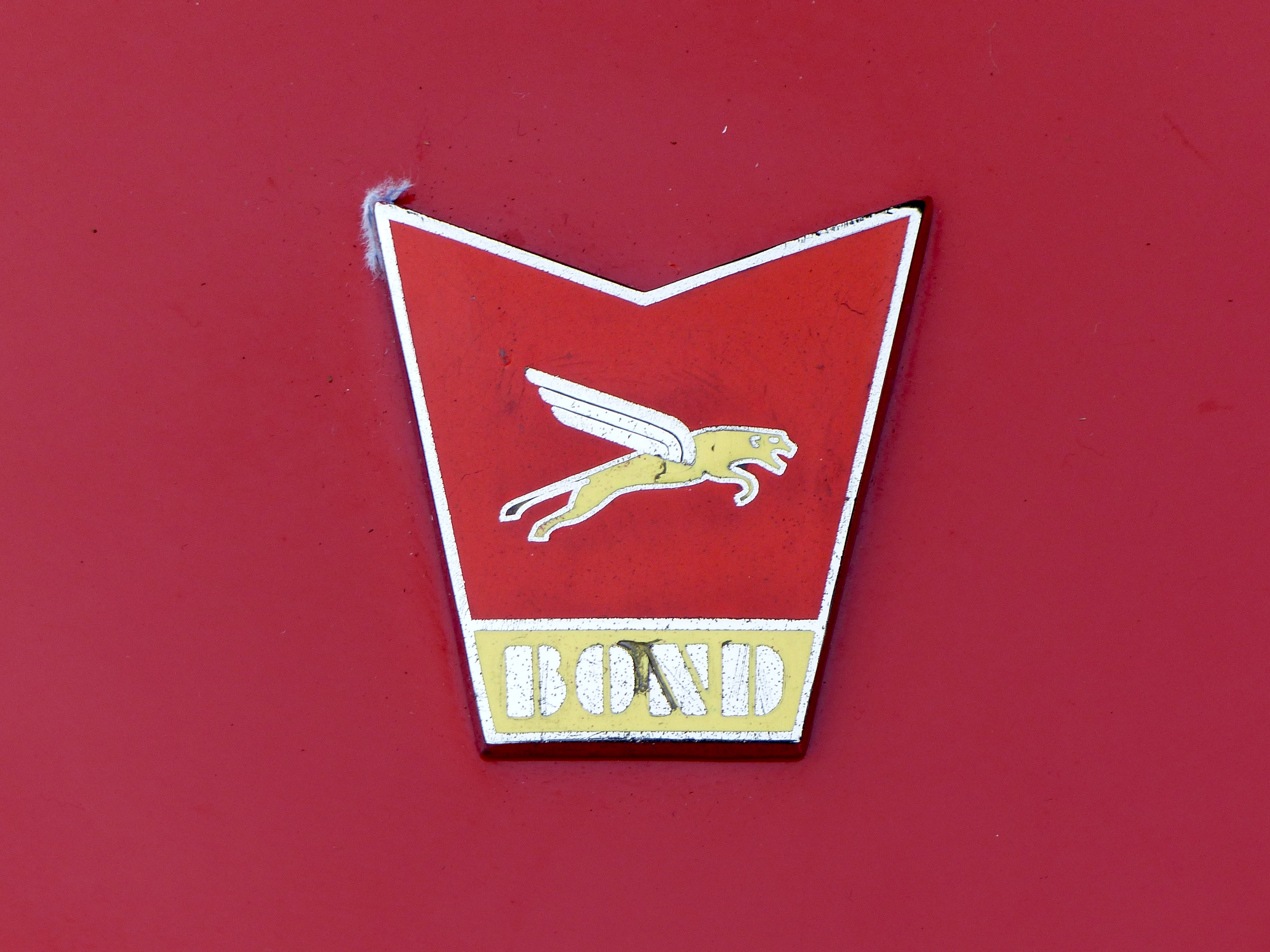
- Company type: Private company
- Industry: Automotive industry
- Founded: 1922
- Founder: Paul Sharp
- Defunct: 1970
- Successor: Reliant Motors
- Headquarters: Preston, Lancashire, England
- Number of locations: Production; Preston, England
- Key people: Lawrie Bond, designer
- Products: Automobiles, racing cars

Sharp's Commercials Ltd was a British car maker based in Preston, Lancashire. It was founded in 1922 by Paul Sharp. It changed its name to Bond Cars Ltd in 1963. The company was taken over by the Reliant Motor Co Ltd of Tamworth, Staffordshire in February 1969, who eventually closed the Preston factory at the end of July 1970, transferring the spare parts business for the Bond Minicar, 875 saloon, 875 Ranger van and Equipe models to a firm called Bob Joyner & Son in Oldbury in the English Midlands. Reliant nevertheless continued to use the Bond name until 1974 on Bond Bug models made at their own Tamworth plant.

== Bond Minicar (1949–1966) ==
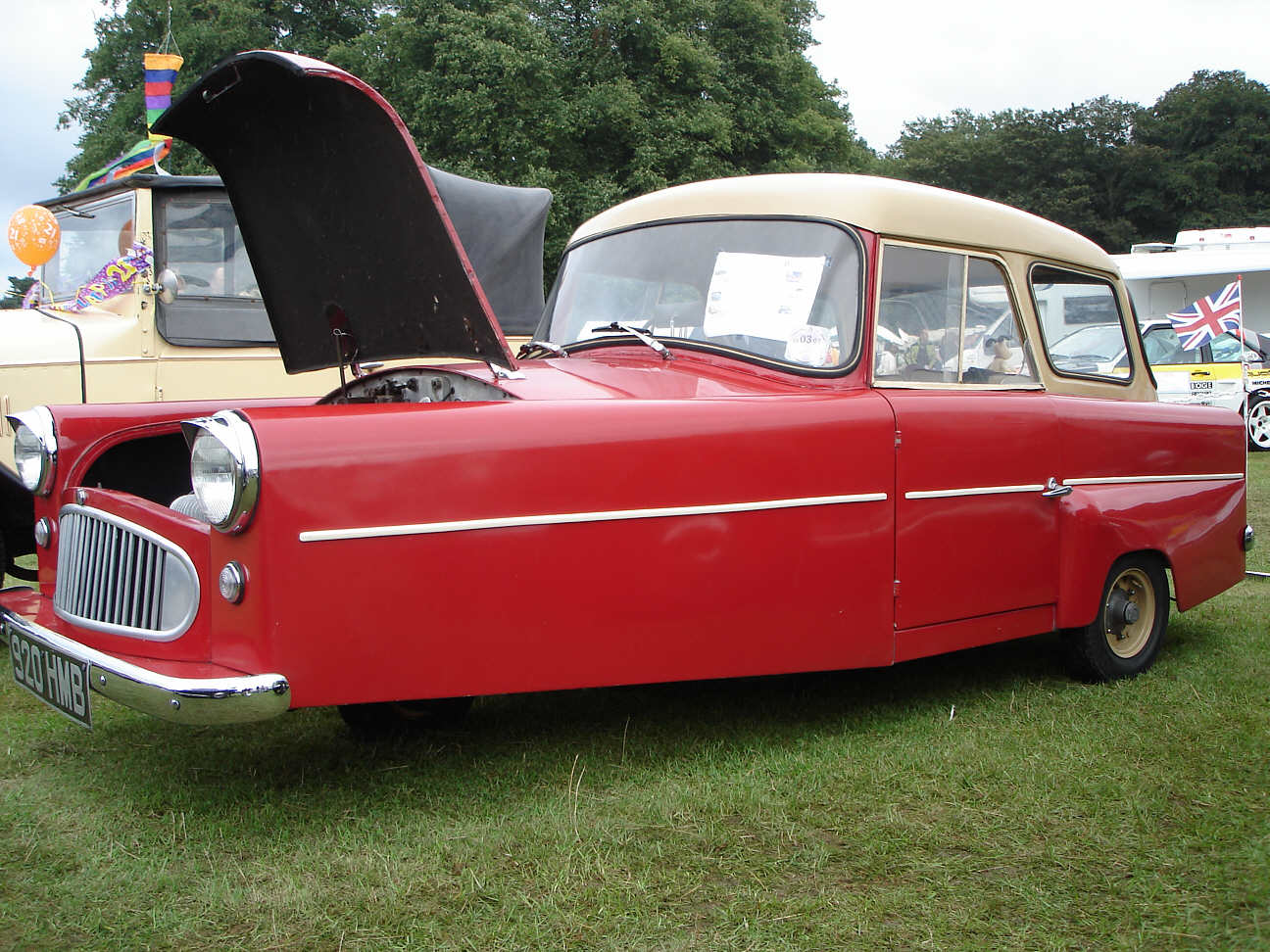
1959 Bond Minicar Mark F Family Saloon

Parking out with Bond Minicar

Sharp's Commercials began production of an economical three-wheeled car early in 1949. Based on a design by Lawrie Bond, it was called the "Bond Minicar" (retrospectively to be called the Mark A) and was powered by a single-cylinder two-stroke Villiers engine of 122 or 197 cc. Bodywork was mostly aluminium, though some later models used fibreglass for parts of the car. It proved very popular at the time owing to post-war economies.

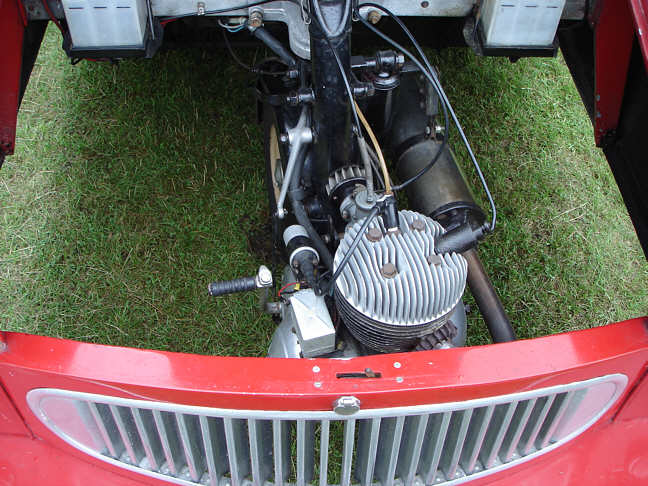
The engine bay of a 1959 Bond Minicar. (Note the unmodified kick-starter on the right of the Villiers unit.)

The Minicar moved on through several different incarnations, culminating in the "Mark G" in 1961. Convertibles were offered, as were van and estate versions. The engine was upgraded, first to a single-cylinder 250 cc and then to a 250 cc twin-cylinder Villiers 4T (optional only on the Mark G). The engines were essentially a Villiers motorcycle-type unit and therefore had no reverse gear. However, this was a minimal inconvenience, because the engine, gearbox and front wheel were mounted as a single unit and could be turned by the steering wheel up to 90 degrees either side of the straight-ahead position, enabling the car to turn within its own length.

Reverse gear of a sort was offered on later models, but using this involved stopping the engine and starting it backwards. This was achieved by reversing the Siba Dynastart unit, a device which doubled as both starter and generator. It operated as a starter motor when the starter button was pressed but when the engine was running it generated power instead and recharged the battery.

The last Bond Minicar, a Mark G, was made in November 1966.

== Racing cars ==
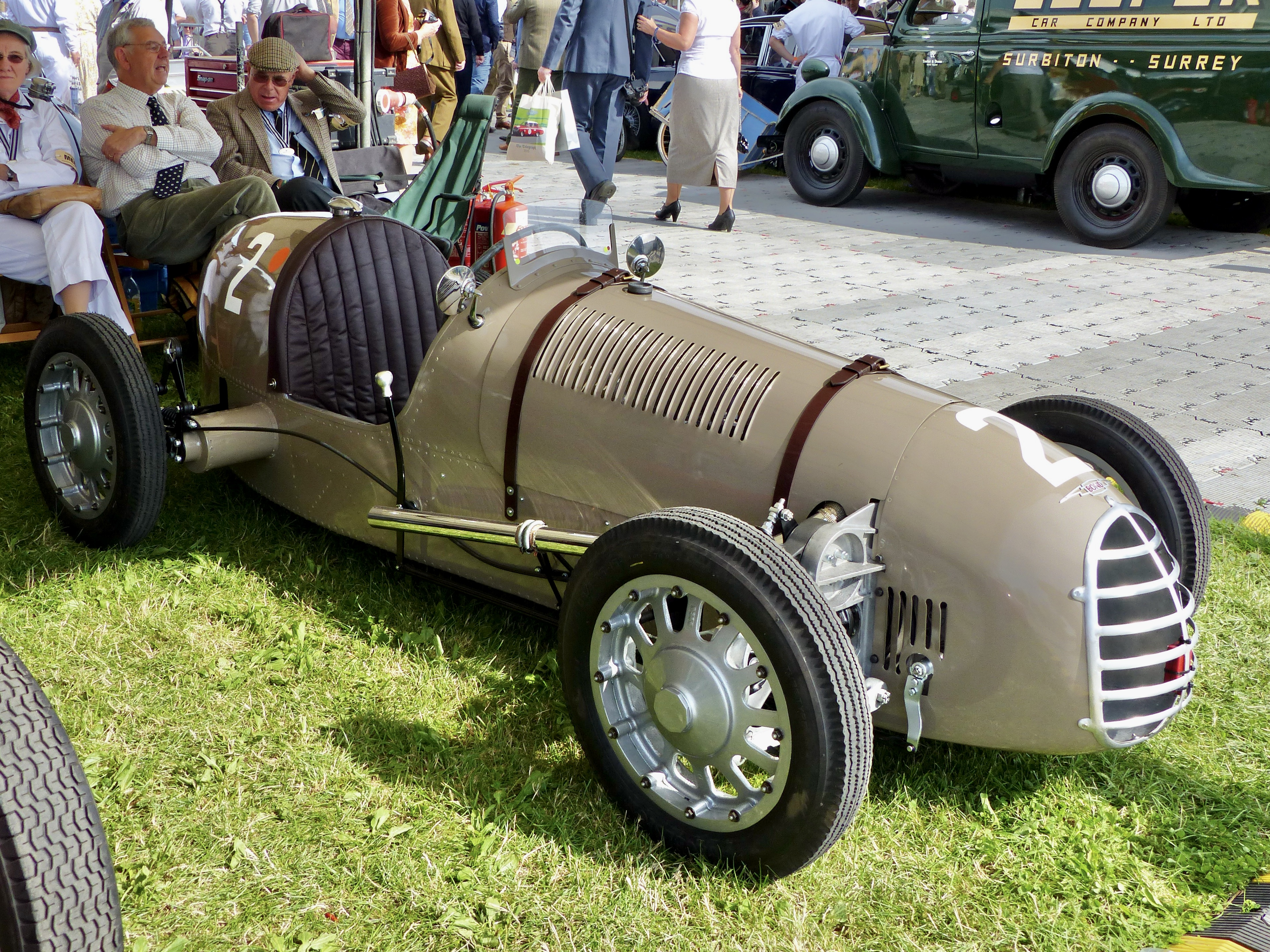
Bond Type C Formula 500 car, Goodwood Revival, 2015

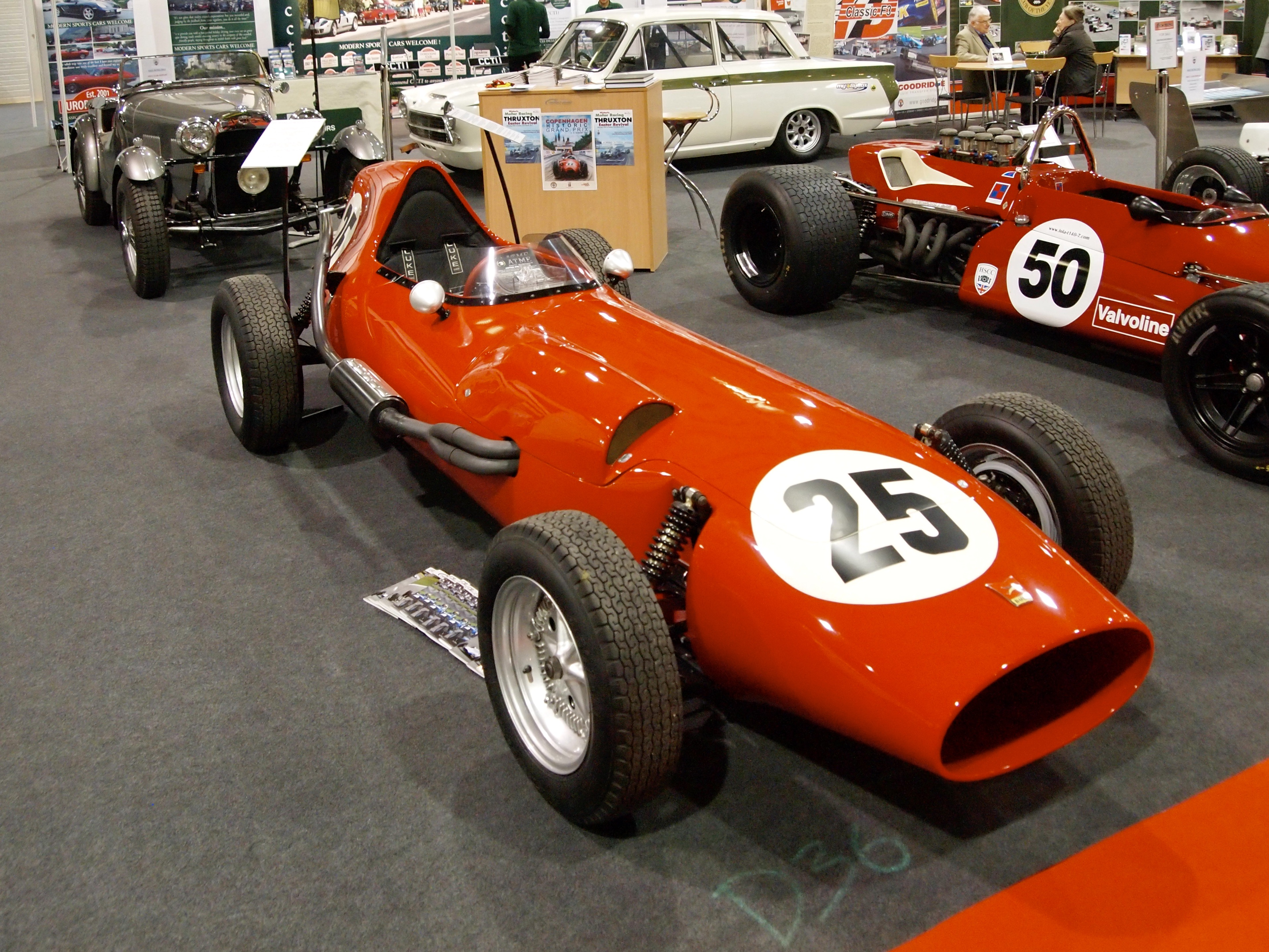
Bond Formula Junior from 1960, Race Retro, Stoneleigh, 2013

In 1948, Lawrie Bond produced a tiny Rudge-powered special to take part in hillclimbing, and followed this up with the Type C, built for the 500cc Formula 3 of the early 1950s. Being a front-engined car, the few examples built struggled against the Coopers which dominated the formula. Bond also built a one-off Formula Junior car in 1960 which also lacked success, again the front-engined route proving the wrong way to go; a second, part-built, car was completed in 2011 to take part in historic motor racing.

== Bond Equipe (1963–1970) ==
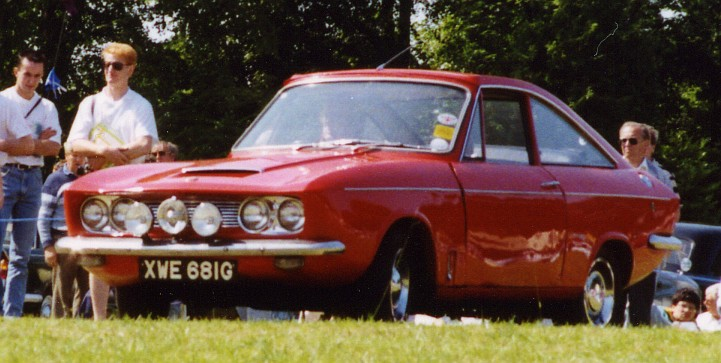
Bond Equipe 2 litre saloon Mk 2

The Equipe GT was Bond's first four-wheel car, a sports car, with fibreglass two door body. Essentially it was a Triumph Herald chassis, complete with bulkhead, windscreen and doors, with the Triumph Spitfire 1147 cc engine. The doors had slightly revised glass, to accommodate the fibreglass fastback roof and rear assembly. The Herald's forward hingeing bonnet was replaced with a revised version giving an excellent, clean sportscar-like appearance. This was replaced by the GT4S model in 1964, offering 4 seats, and an opening boot lid. In front, the beautiful Italianate bonnet styling was somewhat compromised by the addition of the quad headlights from the Triumph 2000, flanking a cut-down version of the original Herald grille. A bonnet scoop was also added. A 1296cc engine was introduced in 1967. During the life of this car, it was not uncommon to see Triumph Heralds modified by the fitting of a Bond Equipe bonnet, as all the side body lines matched perfectly. Less common were Bond Equipes, bizarrely fitted with Herald front ends.

In August 1967, 19 months before the take-over by Reliant in February 1969, the new Equipe 2 Litre was introduced. Based partly on styling proposals by Trevor Fiore but mainly designed by Bond's own in-house designer, Alan Pounder, the doors had new skins and all external traces of the Triumph Herald were gone, with the exception of the windscreen surround and the bonnet catches. The Triumph 2000 headlamps were retained, but were now incorporated into a more stylish, full width grille. At the rear, the Lucas triple-bullet tail-lamps were replaced and this version of the car began to resemble the later Reliant Scimitar SS1, which would not in fact appear for another twenty years. This model had the six-cylinder 2-litre Triumph Vitesse chassis and engine, uprated to the Mk 2 version in 1968, at which time a convertible version was also offered.

== Bond 875 (1965–1970) ==
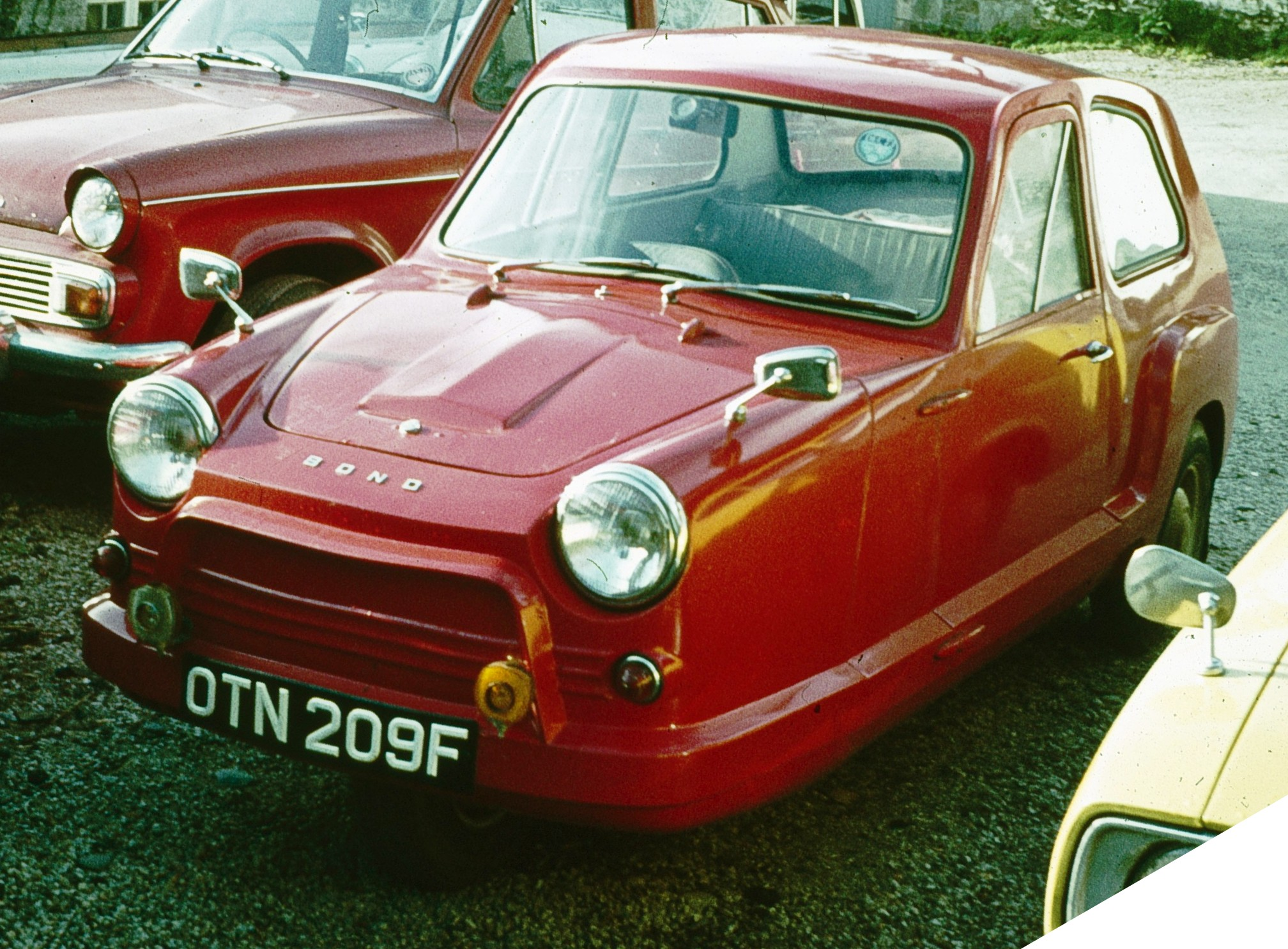
Bond 875 Mark 1 saloon

The Bond 875 was a three-wheeler with a rear-mounted four-cylinder 875 cc four-stroke, Hillman Imp engine. It was discontinued in 1970 after Reliant took over Bond.

== Bond Bug (1970–1974) ==
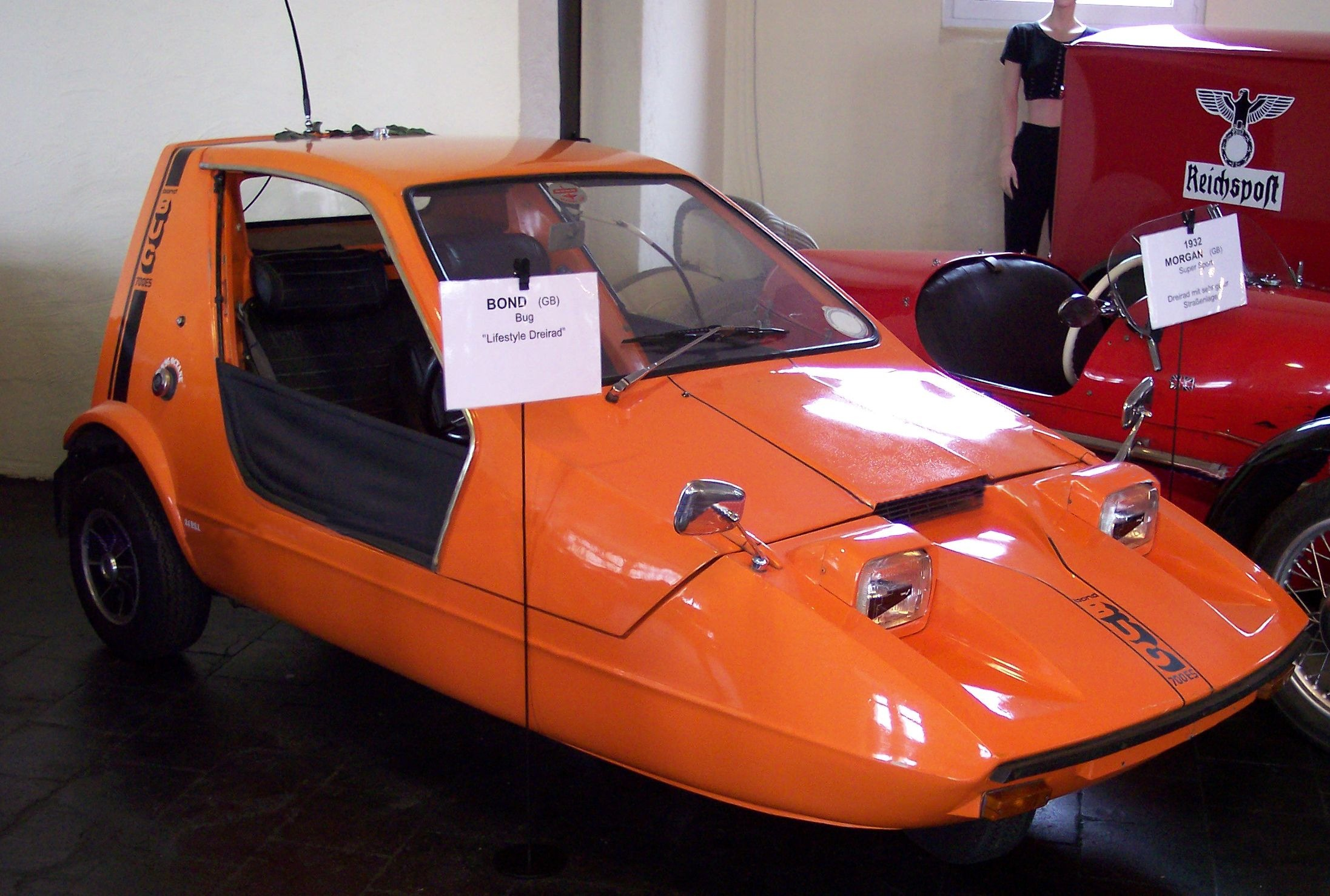
Bond Bug 700 ES

The Bond Bug, based on a Reliant Regal, became a fashion statement in the 1970s. The Bug was a three-wheeler with a Reliant 700 cc (later increased to 750 cc) four-cylinder engine and a top speed of 75 mph (121 km/h). Finished in a lurid orange, the Bug had a "wedge" body styled by Tom Karen of Ogle Design. Lacking conventional doors, entry was gained by swinging the roof upwards on a pair of hinges.

== Other products ==
Other products produced by the company included Motorscooters, a power ski, trailer tents, suitcases, etc.

== See also ==
- List of car manufacturers of the United Kingdom
