= Bond 875 =

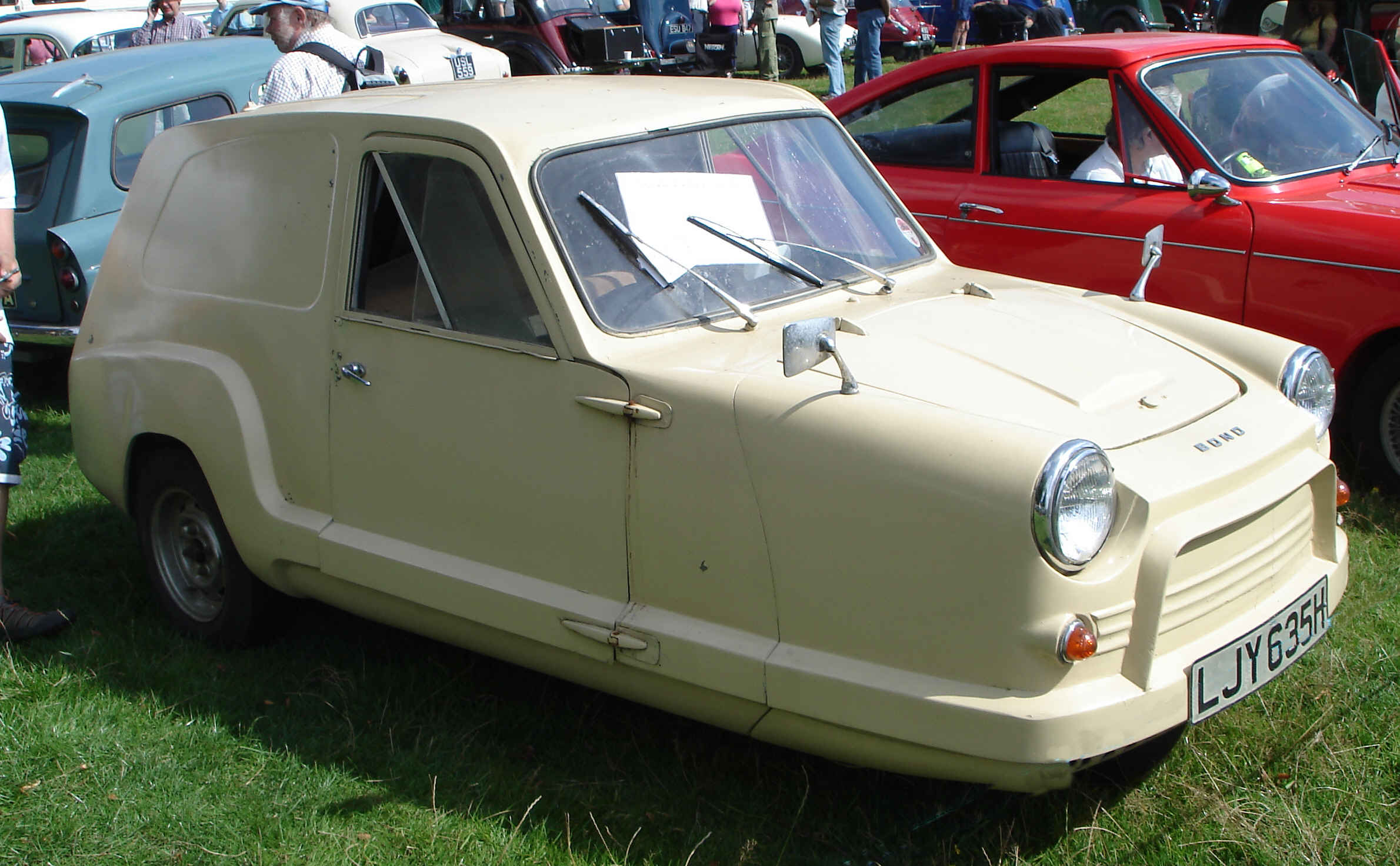
- 1970 Bond 875 Ranger van

Overview
- Manufacturer: Bond Cars Ltd
- Production: 1965–1970; 3,431 made
- Assembly: United Kingdom: Preston, England

Body and chassis
- Class: Microcar
- Body style: 2-door saloon 2-door van

Powertrain
- Engine: Rootes Commer Imp van, 875 cc, 34 b.h.p.
- Transmission: 4-speed manual

Dimensions
- Wheelbase: 78 in (1,981 mm)
- Length: 116 in (2,946 mm)
- Width: 55 in (1,397 mm)

Chronology
- Predecessor: Bond Minicar
- Successor: Bond Bug

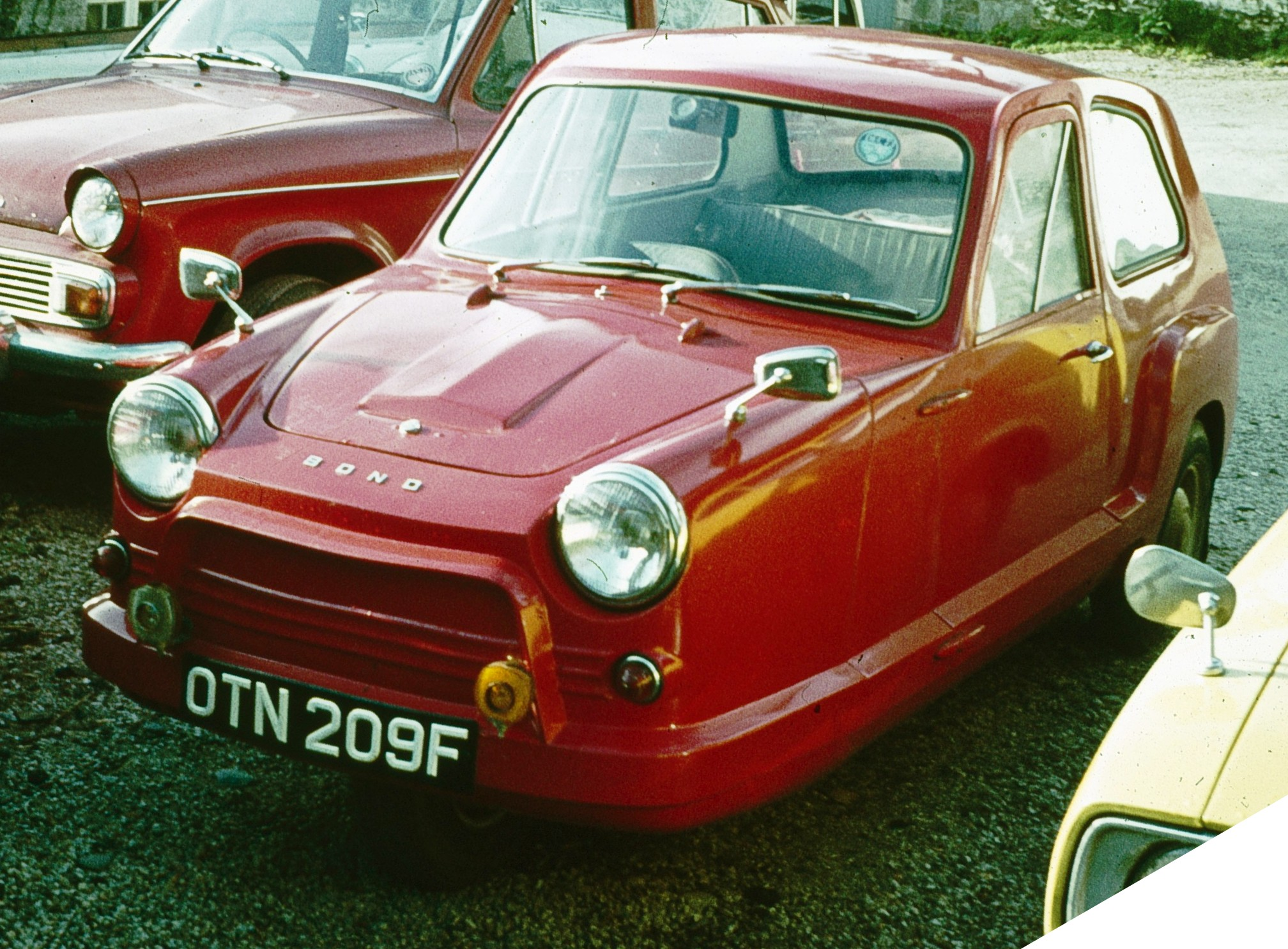
The Bond 875 Saloon gives a faint indication of subsequent Reliant designs.

The Bond 875 is a small three-wheeled car partly designed by Lawrence "Lawrie" Bond and manufactured by Bond Cars Ltd in Preston, United Kingdom, from 1965 to 1970. There was also a van version from 1967, known as the Ranger.

The car was announced in August 1965, though volume production got under way only during summer 1966. The 875 used the lower-compression (8:1) four-cylinder 875 cc 34 b.h.p. four-stroke engine used in the Commer Imp Van from the Rootes Group. Crucially for the dynamics of the vehicle, this was rear-mounted, unlike in most other British three-wheelers of the era. It was the same basic layout as used in the Hillman Imp, installed as a complete package along with the Imps' transmission, rear suspension and rear wheels. However, because the 875 had a fibreglass body along with aluminium doors, and weighed less than 400 kg (882 lb), the performance was good – better than the Imp. The low-compression engine meant it was able to run on "2-star" low-octane petrol, which was cheaper than varieties used by larger and more highly tuned engines.

The car's light weight enabled it to qualify for motorcycle road tax rates, and be driven on a motorcycle licence, but in order to keep the weight down, the interior trim and fittings were minimal.

Racing driver John Surtees drove the car at Brands Hatch in 1965, setting a fastest lap of 1:22 for the 1.24-mile circuit and attaining speeds over 100 mph (161 km/h). Bond played on the car's sporty reputation, track-testing a standard production version around the Silverstone Circuit in 1966, setting a lap time of 1:43.34 and reaching 76 mph (122 km/h) through a timing trap along the Hanger Straight. Following the test, Bond refused to confirm or deny that they would be building a racing version of the car for 1967.

== Development ==
A van version, the Ranger, was introduced in April 1967.

Styling changes, including rectangular headlamps, a new front grille, a larger bonnet opening, and revised seats, heralded the "Mark II", announced in April 1968. Other changes included the fitting of a heater as standard equipment.

== Specification and performance ==
- Capacity: 875 cc, 34 b.h.p.
- Weight: < 400 kg (882 lb)
- 0-60 mph: 16 seconds
- Top speed: 80 mph (129 km/h)
- Fuel economy: 50 mpg_{‑imp} (5.6 L/100 km; 42 mpg_{‑US}) - 55 mpg_{‑imp} (5.1 L/100 km; 46 mpg_{‑US})
- Tyres: Michelin X radial
- Price new: £500

== Road test ==
The British Autocar magazine tested a Bond 875 in September 1966. The car's power-to-weight ratio converted into a top speed of 82.8 mph (133.3 km/h) and acceleration from 0-60 mph (97 km/h) in 22.5 seconds. An "overall" fuel consumption of 34.5 miles per imperial gallon (8.2 L/100 km; 28.7 mpg_{‑US}) was recorded. That put it usefully ahead of the contemporary 850 cc Morris Mini on maximum speed and acceleration, as well as on fuel economy. The manufacturer's recommended price of the Bond was £506, which was higher than the £478 price for the Mini, but less than the recommended retail price of £549 for the comparably sized Imp. The testers commended the Bond's performance and economy, but found the three-wheeler unstable at high speed. They thought the gear box and brakes good, but were disappointed by "poor seats and detail finish".
