= Bond Minicar =

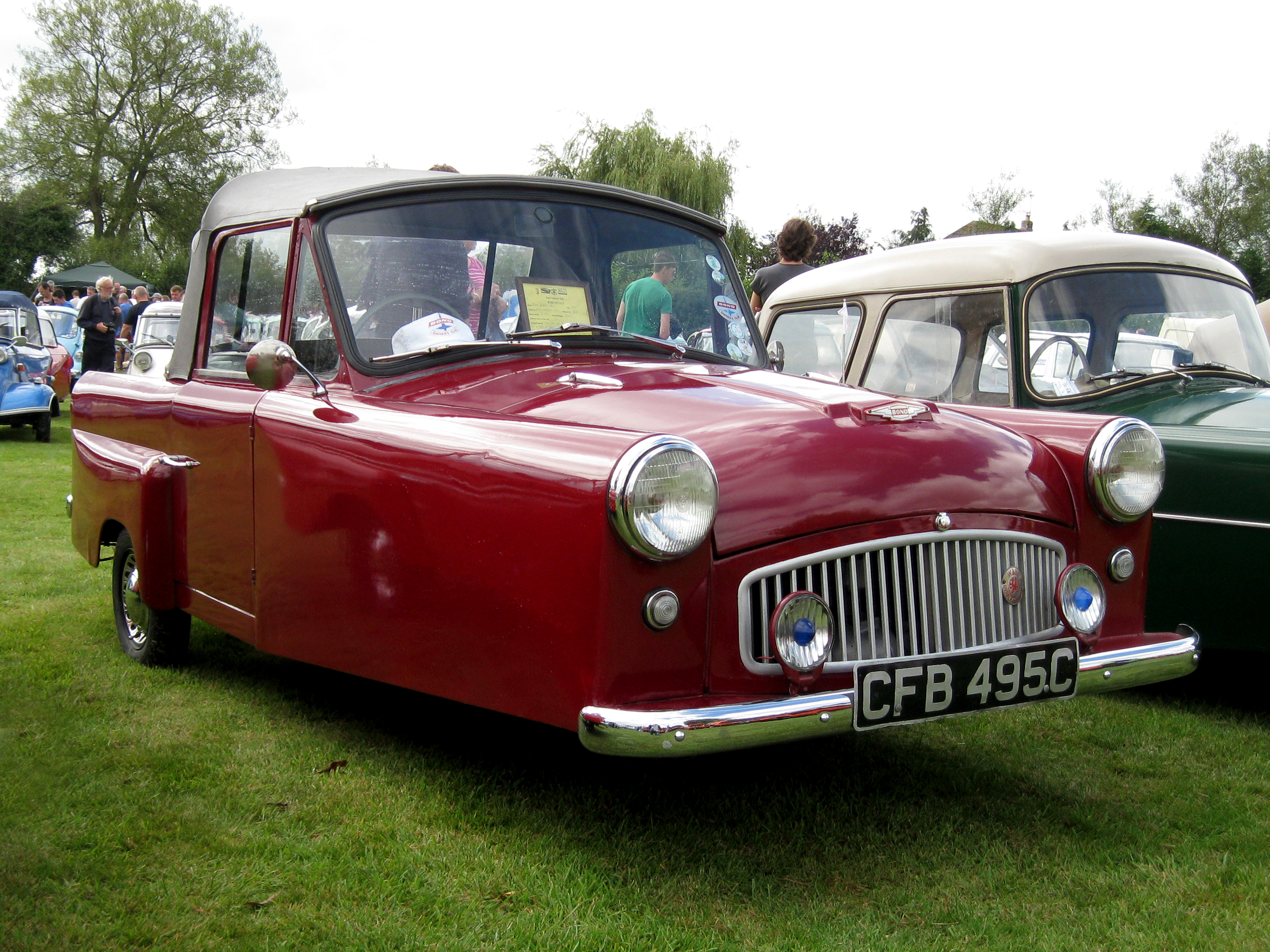
- 1964 Bond Minicar Mark G Tourer

Overview
- Manufacturer: Sharp's Commercials Ltd
- Production: 1949–1966; 24,482 made
- Assembly: United Kingdom: Preston, England

Body and chassis
- Class: Microcar
- Layout: FF layout

Chronology
- Successor: Bond 875

Bond Minicar is a series of economical three-wheeled microcars which were manufactured by the British car manufacturer Sharp's Commercials Ltd (the company was renamed Bond Cars Limited in October 1963), in Preston, Lancashire, between 1949 and 1966.

== Origins ==
The basic concept for the minicar was derived from a prototype built by Lawrence "Lawrie" Bond, an engineer from Preston. During the war, Bond had worked as an aeronautical designer for the Blackburn Aircraft Company before setting up a small engineering business in Blackpool, manufacturing aircraft and vehicle components for the government. After the war he moved his company to Longridge where he built a series of small, innovative racing cars, which raced with a modest amount of success. In the early part of 1948, he revealed the prototype of what was described as a new minicar to the press.

Described as a "short radius runabout, for the purpose of shopping and calls within a 20-30-mile radius", the prototype was demonstrated climbing a 25 per cent gradient with driver and passenger on board. It was reported to have a 125 cc (8 cu in) Villiers two-stroke engine with a three-speed gearbox, a dry weight of 195 pounds (88 kg) and a cruising speed of around 30 mph (48 km/h). At the time of the report (May 1948), it was stated that production was "expected to start in three months' time". The prototype was built at Bond's premises in Berry Lane, Longridge where it is now commemorated with a blue plaque.

Sharp's Commercials was a company contracted by the Ministry of Supply to rebuild military vehicles. Knowing that the Ministry were ending their contract in 1948, and recognising the limitations of his existing works as a base for mass production, Bond approached the Managing Director of Sharp's, Lt. Col. Charles Reginald 'Reg' Gray, to ask if he could rent the factory to build his car. Gray refused, but said that instead, Sharp's could manufacture the car for Bond and the two entered into an agreement on this basis. Bond carried out some further development work on the Minicar, but once mass production was underway, left the project and sold the design and manufacturing rights to Sharp's.

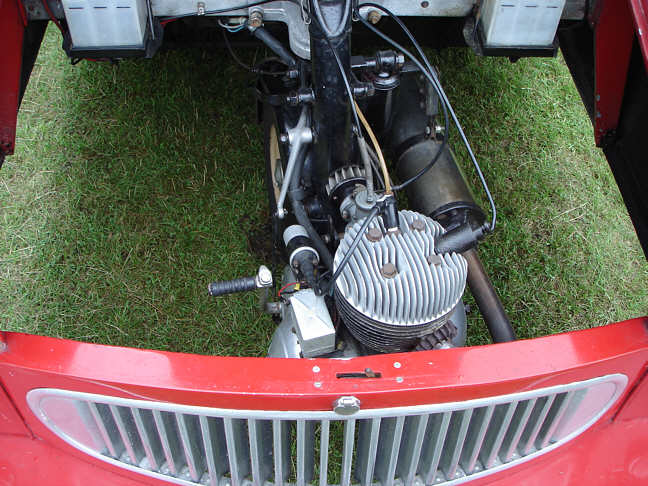
The engine bay of a 1959 Minicar Mark F. The kick start on the right hand side of the engine was fitted for emergency use; all Minicars were started from the driver's seat.

The prototype and early cars utilised stressed skin aluminium bodywork, though later models incorporated chassis members of steel. The Minicar was amongst the first British cars to use fibreglass body panels.

Though retaining much of Lawrie Bond's original concept of a simple, lightweight, economical vehicle, the Minicar was gradually developed by Sharp's through several different iterations. The majority of cars were convertibles, though later, hardtop models were offered, along with van and estate versions. Minicars were generally available either in standard or deluxe form, though the distinction between the two was largely one of mechanical detail rather than luxury. The cars were powered initially by a single-cylinder two-stroke Villiers engine of 122 cc (7 cu in). In December 1949 this was upgraded to a 197 cc (12 cu in) unit. The engine was further upgraded in 1958, first to a single-cylinder 247 cc (15 cu in) and then to a 247 cc (15 cu in) twin-cylinder Villiers 4T. These air-cooled engines were developed principally as motorcycle units and therefore had no reverse gear. However, this was a minimal inconvenience, because the engine, gearbox and front wheel were mounted as a single unit and could be turned by the steering wheel up to 90 degrees either side of the straight-ahead position, enabling the car to turn within its own length.

A method of reversing the car was offered on later models via a reversible Dynastart unit. The Dynastart unit, which doubled as both starter motor and dynamo on these models incorporated a built-in reversing solenoid switch. After stopping the engine and operating this switch the Dynastart, and consequently the engine, would rotate in the opposite direction.

== Tax position ==
=== Tax advantages ===
The car proved popular in the UK market, where its three-wheel configuration meant that it qualified for a lower rate of purchase tax, lower vehicle excise duty and cheaper insurance than comparable four-wheel cars. The three-wheel configuration, low weight and lack of a reverse gear also meant that it could be driven on a motor cycle licence.

=== Tax changes ===
In April 1962 the purchase tax rate of 55 percent, which had been applied to all four-wheeled cars sold in the UK since the war was reduced to 45 per cent. In November 1962, it was reduced by another 20 per centage points to 25 per cent – the same rate as that applied to three-wheelers. This rapid change meant that at the point of sale, some three-wheelers became more expensive than four-wheeled cars like the Mini. In response, Tom Gratrix, head of Sharp's sent a telegram to the Chancellor of the Exchequer warning that unless a similar tax cut were given to the purchase tax rate for three-wheelers, there would be 300 redundancies and possibly the closure of the Sharp's factory. No cut was forthcoming, sales of Minicars declined rapidly from this point and the final Minicar was produced in 1966. At the end of production 24,482 had been made.

== Minicar (1949–1951) ==
Bond Minicar
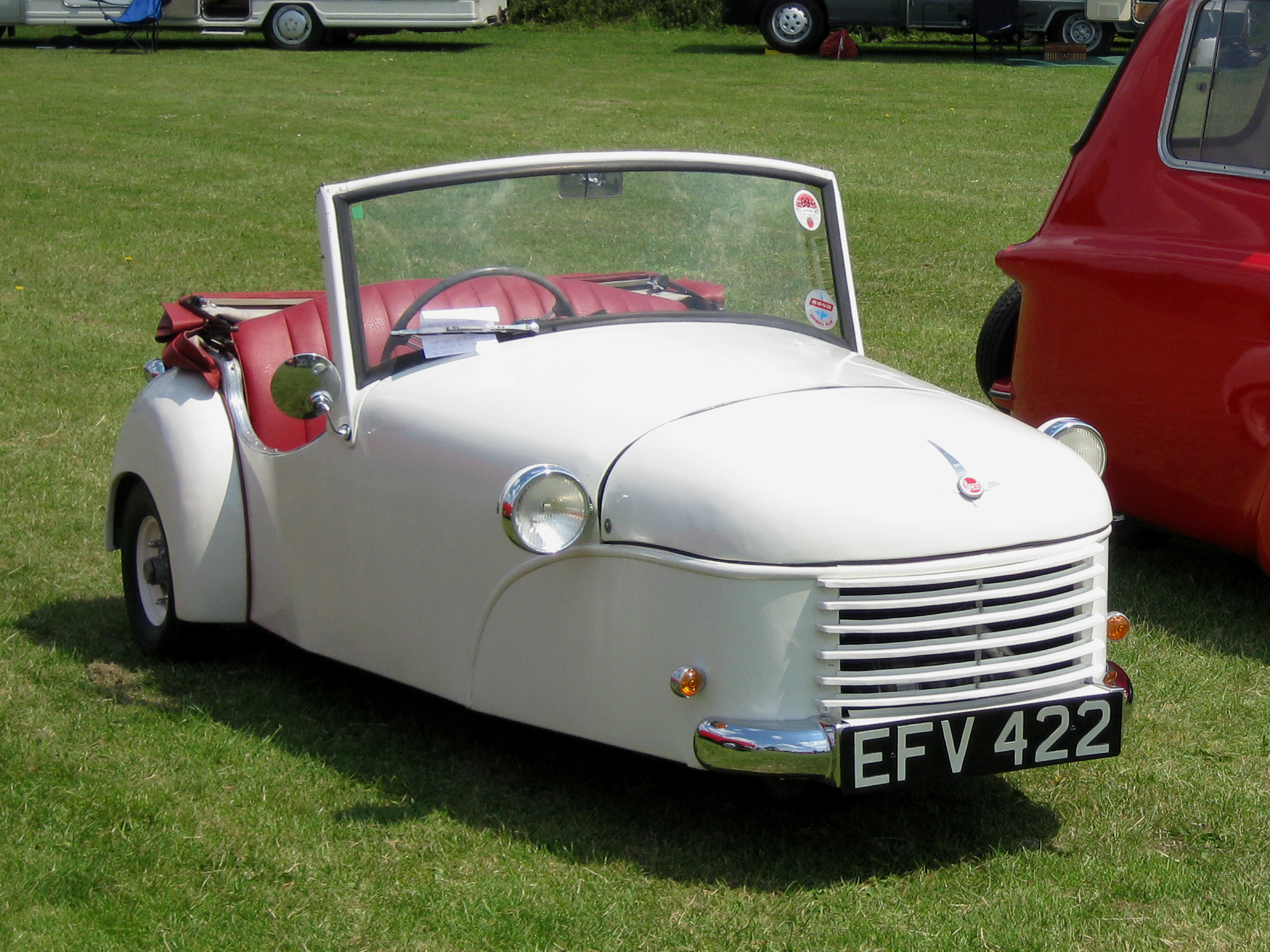
- 1951 Bond Minicar Deluxe 2/3 seater Tourer

Overview
- Also called: Bond Minicar Mark A
- Production: 1949–1951; 1,973 made

Body and chassis
- Body style: 0-door convertible

Powertrain
- Engine: Villiers 10D 122 cc (7 cu in) or Villiers 6E 197 cc (12 cu in) single-cylinder 2-stroke
- Transmission: 3-speed manual

Dimensions
- Wheelbase: 5 ft 5 in (1,650 mm)
- Length: 8 ft 10 in (2,690 mm)
- Width: 4 ft 7 in (1,400 mm)
- Height: 3 ft 6 in (1,070 mm)
- Kerb weight: 310 lb (140 kg)

Chronology
- Successor: Bond Minicar Mark B

Sold as the Bond Minicar (the Mark A suffix being added only after the Mark B was introduced), the car was advertised as the world's most economical car. It was austere and simple in design, without luxuries. Production began in January 1949, although 90 per cent of the initial production was said to have been allocated to the overseas market.

As with the prototype, a large proportion of the Minicar was made from different aluminium alloys. The main body was a very simple construction of 18 swg sheet with a 14 swg main bulkhead. The integrity of the main stressed skin structure was enhanced by the absence of doors, the bodysides being deemed low enough to be stepped over without major inconvenience (unless you were wearing a skirt). Most of the bodywork panels were flat or fairly simple curves whilst the compound curves of the bonnet and rear mudguard arches were pressed out as separate panels. The windscreen was made from Perspex. The car was alleged to weigh only 308 pounds (140 kg) "all-in" or 285 pounds (129 kg) dry and its light weight was regularly demonstrated by one person lifting the entire rear end of the car off the ground unaided. A test run between Preston and London at an average speed of 22.8 mph (36.7 km/h) gave an average fuel consumption of 97 mpg_{‑imp} (2.9 L/100 km; 81 mpg_{‑US}) for the journey.

The car had a single bench seat with a small open compartment behind suitable for luggage. There was also a fold-down hood with detachable sidescreens. The headlights were separate units mounted on the side of the car, though of such low output, they have been described as providing "more of a glimmer than a beam". At the rear there was a tiny, single, centrally mounted lamp.

The air-cooled Villiers 10D 122 cc (7 cu in) engine had a unit construction three-speed manual gearbox without reverse. This had an output of 5 bhp (4 kW; 5 PS) at 4,400 rpm which the manufacturers claimed gave a power-to-weight ratio of 49 bhp (37 kW; 50 PS) per ton unladen. The engine unit sat in an alloy cradle ahead of the front wheel, together forming part of its support. Both front wheel and engine were sprung as part of the trailing link front suspension system, which was fitted with a single coil spring and an Andre Hartford friction damper. The rear wheels were rigidly mounted to the body on stub axles with suspension provided by low pressure "balloon" type tyres. Starting was achieved by using a pull handle mounted under the dash panel and connected by cable to a modified kick-start lever on the engine. The steering comprised a system of pulleys and a cable usually referred to as "bobbin and cable", connecting a conventional steering wheel to the front steering unit. The bobbin and cable steering arrangement was replaced by a rack and pinion system in October 1950. Brakes were provided on only the rear wheels; they were conventional drum brakes operated by a system of cables and rods. Early on, Sharp's adopted a policy of continual gradual upgrading of the Minicars, either to simplify or reduce maintenance, to redress noted failings or to improve some aspect of performance. Such changes were usually made available as kits to enable existing owners to upgrade their own cars retrospectively.

In December 1949, a Deluxe version was added to the range. This has a Villiers 6E 197 cc (12 cu in) engine, which had an increased output to 8 bhp (6 kW; 8 PS) and a power-to-weight ratio of 51 bhp (38 kW; 52 PS) per ton. There were also a number of modest refinements including a spare wheel and a single wing mirror. The manually operated windscreen wiper fitted on the standard car was upgraded to an electric Lucas type. Although this was found to damage the original perspex windscreen, it was not replaced by a Triplex Safety Glass screen until the introduction of the Mark B in 1951.

A Bond Minicar Deluxe tested by The Motor magazine in 1949 and carrying only the driver had a top speed of 43.3 mph (69.7 km/h) and could accelerate from 0-30 mph (48 km/h) in 13.6 seconds. A fuel consumption of 72 mpg_{‑imp} (3.9 L/100 km; 60 mpg_{‑US}) was recorded. The test car cost £262 including taxes.

Towards the end of 1949 (as unveiled and demonstrated in October at the Motor Cycle Show at Earls Court, London) an optional mechanical reversing device became available which comprised a long lever with a ratchet and a hexagonal socket on the end which fitted onto the centre of the driver's side rear wheel hub. This device could then be operated from the driving seat and allowed the car to be cranked backwards by hand to assist with maneuvering.

== Minicar Mark B (1951–1952) ==
Bond Minicar Mark B
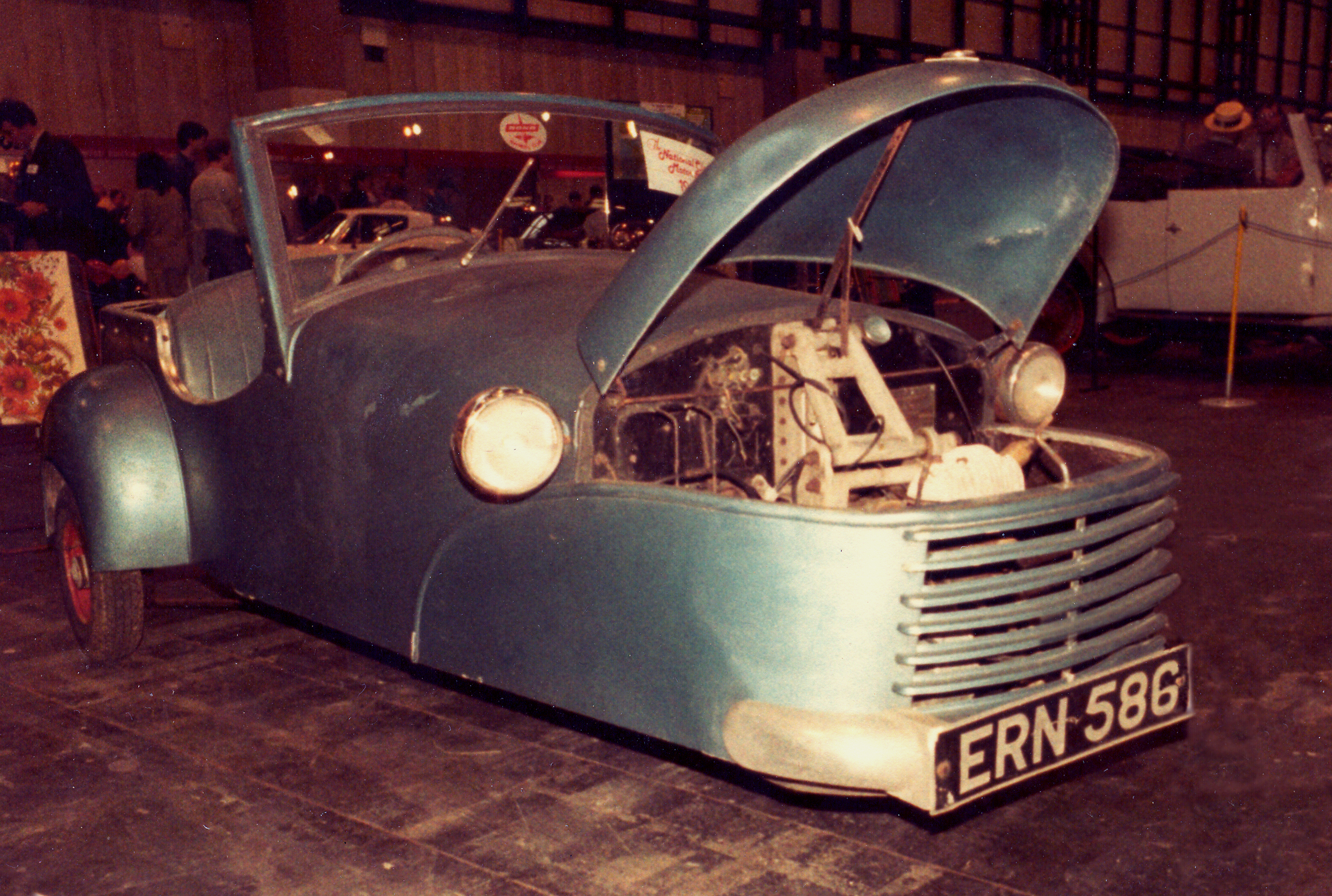
- 1951 Bond Minicar Mark B 2/3 seater Tourer

Overview
- Also called: Sharp's Minitruck (commercial pickup); Sharp's Minivan (commercial van)
- Production: 1951–1952; 1,414 made

Body and chassis
- Body style: 0-door convertible; 0-door pickup truck; 1-door van

Powertrain
- Engine: Villiers 6E 197 cc (12 cu in) single-cylinder 2-stroke
- Transmission: 3-speed manual

Dimensions
- Length: 9 ft 1 in (2,770 mm)
- Width: 5 ft 0 in (1,520 mm)
- Height: 3 ft 9 in (1,140 mm)
- Kerb weight: 420 lb (190 kg)

Chronology
- Successor: Bond Minicar Mark C

Progressive development of the Minicar and Minicar Deluxe continued until the more significant introduction of coil sprung independent rear suspension and the much-needed Triplex Safety glass windscreen. (The Triplex windscreen was subsequently offered by Sharp's Commercials as a retro-fit kit for the earlier Minicar.) This provided an ideal opportunity to relaunch the car as the Bond Minicar (Mark B) in July 1951.

Much of the design work for the Mark B, in particular the rear suspension, was carried out by the engineer Granville Bradshaw. Bradshaw had become involved with the Minicar at the invitation of his brother Ewart Bradshaw, the chairman of Loxhams and Bradshaws Group of which Sharp's Commercials was a subsidiary.

The rear suspension system was of the sliding pillar type, a block carrying the stub axle rode up and down on two guide pillars mounted on a solid casting bolted to the side of the body. The block's vertical movement was controlled by coil springs. The front suspension was upgraded with a hydraulic shock absorber

Externally, the differences between the Mark A and Mark B Minicar were very subtle. The rear mudguards were slightly smaller but wider to accommodate the wheel movement whilst the storage area behind the rear seats was also enlarged, increasing the cars overall length slightly and changing its rear profile. Beneath the bodywork, there were improvements to the electrics and to the braking system. The hood was also redesigned to provide more head room inside the car.

Only one version of the Mark B Tourer was produced, and all production cars had the Villiers 6E engine and Triplex safety glass windscreens.

=== Sharp's Commercial vehicles (1951–1952) ===
At the motorcycle show in November 1951, Sharp's announced what they described as "a revolutionary design in the field of commercial vehicles". The Sharp's Commercial 3 Cwt took the concept of the Minicar's light, three-wheeled, utilitarian design, and adapted it as the basis for an open-top lightweight industrial vehicle. The yellow and black prototype at the show was powered by an Indian Brave 248 cc (15 cu in) four-stroke side valve engine (supplied by Brockhouse Engineering Co., Southport) and mounted in a cradle ahead and above the front wheel. Though described as "constructed on the stressed-skin principle", large cut outs to allow easy access from either side of the vehicle required much additional strengthening to the floor, with a central steel backbone girder, a cross member between the rear wheels and further triangular bracing. The single seat was located centrally as was the steering wheel. Steering was by worm and sector, and flared side panels allowed the single front wheel to turn a full 180°, making the vehicle extremely manoeuvrable. The entire engine, drive-train and steering unit could be removed by undoing four bolts to allow for easy servicing. Unlike the Minicar, there were brakes on all three wheels and there was a wooden-slatted floor behind the driver. Though the Sharp's Commercial never entered production, it served as a forerunner to van and pickup versions of the Mark B which appeared in 1952.

The Sharp's Minitruck, (initially, they were referred to as Utility in the production records) was the pickup version, which outwardly was very similar to the Mark B Tourer, but included an extension of the bodywork behind the rear wheel. It also replaced the Tourer's bench seat with a single seat for the driver although unlike the centrally mounted one in the Commercial 3 Cwt, this was conventionally placed on the right. The extended goods compartment and space alongside the driver provided a claimed load capacity of 3 cwt and 24 cu ft (0.68 m^{3}). The open-top vehicle had a folding hood with a roll-up flap at the back of the car to assist loading.

The Sharp's Minivan, was introduced alongside the Minitruck. It had the same load capacity and also shared the same extended length of the pick-up, but had an enclosed aluminium compartment behind the driver's seat with a side hinged rear door. A short fabric roof covered the gap between the van compartment and the windscreen.

A further final development based on the Minivan was the Bond Family "Safety Saloon". Additional side windows were fitted to the rear compartment of the van and two small hammock type seats were added either side of the rear door facing inwards. With the bench seat of the tourer replacing the single front seat of the van and pickup, this gave enough room for two children and two adults. The number of "Safety Saloons" produced is unknown, as factory records do not distinguish between the Saloon and the Minivan.

Total production for the Mark B was 1,414 vehicles including 240 Minitrucks / Utilities and 84 Minivans (and "Safety Saloons").

== Minicar Mark C (1952–1956) ==
Bond Minicar Mark C
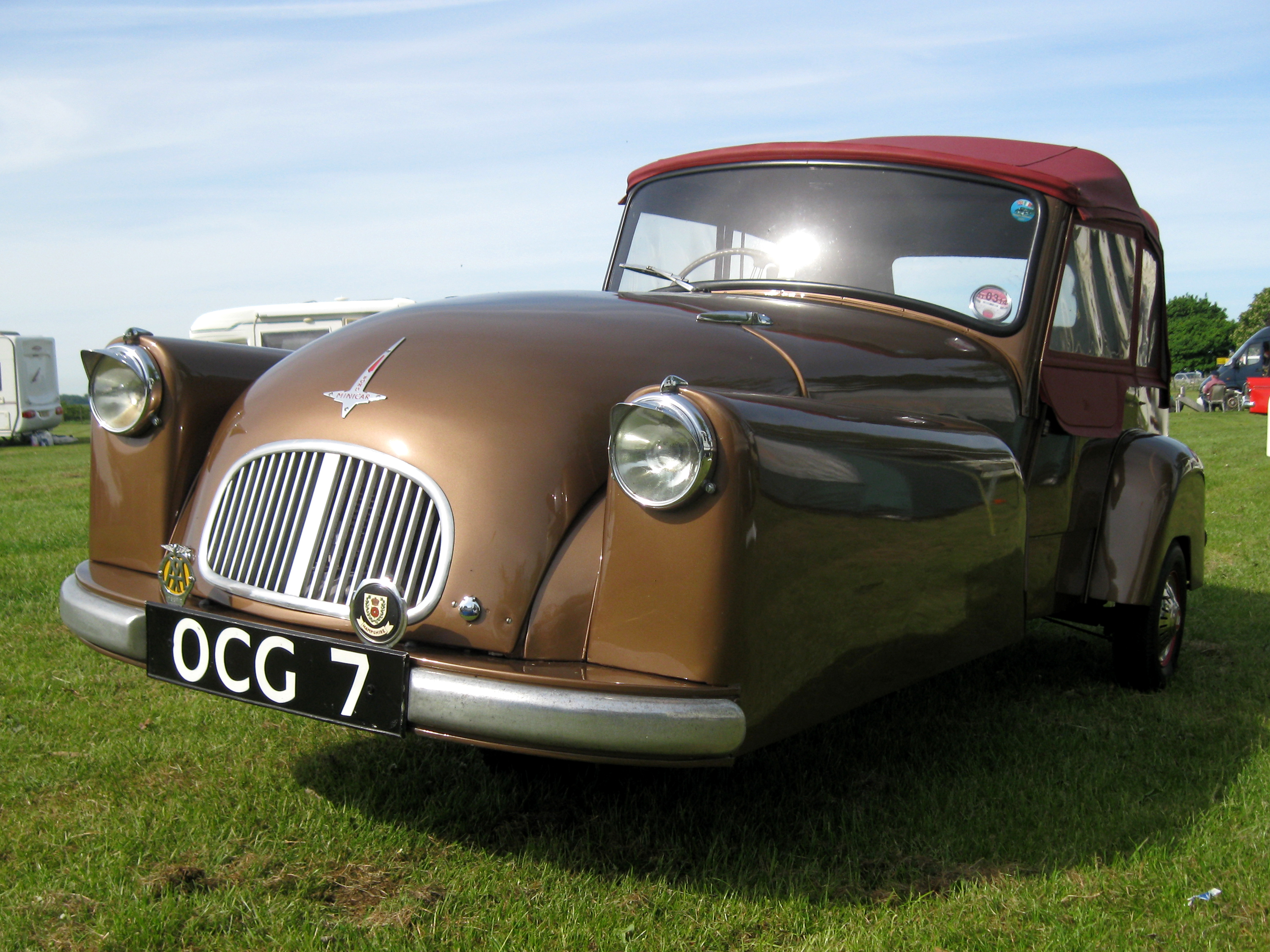
- 1955 Bond Minicar Mark C Deluxe Family Safety model with the Type I grille

Overview
- Also called: Sharp's Minitruck (commercial pickup); Sharp's Minivan (commercial van)
- Production: 1952–1956; 6,399 made

Body and chassis
- Body style: 1-door convertible; 1-door pickup truck; 2-door van

Powertrain
- Engine: Villiers 6E & 8E 197 cc (12 cu in) Single cylinder 2 stroke
- Transmission: 3-speed manual

Dimensions
- Wheelbase: 5 ft 6 in (1,680 mm)
- Length: 9 ft 10 in (3,000 mm)
- Width: 4 ft 9 in (1,450 mm)
- Height: 4 ft 2 in (1,270 mm)
- Kerb weight: 460 lb (210 kg)

Chronology
- Successor: Bond Minicar Mark D

Around the same time as the Mark B was launched, work had begun on what was referred to subsequently as a "streamlined version" of the Minicar. Badged as the 'ESC' (England's Smallest Car), this prototype utilised the main body and rear suspension of the Mark B, but added mock front wings, a passenger side door and a valance beneath its oval-shaped grille.

By the time of the Earl's Court Cycle and Motor Cycle Show in November 1951, three pre-production Mark C's were on show. On these the front wings had become longer and less triangular in profile than the ESC, the grille was also lower and more rounded and the front valance was now a more defined bumper shape. The new Minicar design was very well received, and was due to go on sale in early 1952. By July however, "owing to supply difficulties" it was still unavailable, and the earliest production cars were not recorded as being built until October 1952. Four of the cars were on display at that year's show along with a Sharp's Minivan.

The change in the body style from the Mark B was both functional and aesthetic. The Mark C utilised the same 180° steering lock and worm and sector steering system that was seen in the prototype Commercial and the front wings allowed for ample clearance at full lock. They also addressed a demand from customers for a "greater smoothness of line", and allowed a more robust location for the mounting of the front lights. Other improvements included rod and cable operated brakes on all three wheels, which "appreciably shortens stopping distances."

During development, the Mark C had utilised the same sliding pillar suspension on the rear as the Mark B, but by September 1952, this had been changed for Flexitor suspension units produced by George Spencer Moulton & Co. Ltd. The Flexitor units were a type of lever arm shock absorber which used bonded rubber in torsion as the shock absorber. On these units a stub axle is mounted upon a trailing-arm with the pivot point being a steel rod. This rod is bonded inside a rubber tube which runs through and is also bonded to an external steel housing. The housing is bolted to the underside of the car. The units provide about 3 in (76 mm) of vertical movement to each independent rear axle.

The engine mounting was substantially different. Instead of being suspended from an alloy cradle as on the Mark A and B, the engine now sat in a steel cradle bolted to a steeply inclined steel tube that pivoted directly behind the engine through an alloy steering head bracket. This bracket, holding the engine and front wheel unit is bolted to a cast alloy bulkhead which forms a major structural component of the car. The engine mounting was said to have been a regular source of failures on both the Mark A and the Mark B, and this new design was again the work of Granville Bradshaw.

The single side door, which had been introduced to around 6½ per cent of Mark B production vehicles after November 1951, became a standard fixture on the Mark C. Because the car's monocoque construction depended principally upon its skin for rigidity, the size of door was severely limited and to overcome the resulting decrease in structural rigidity, vertical steel strengthening brackets were fitted either side and along the bottom edge of the door aperture.

By January 1953, some cars were being fitted with fibreglass rear wings. Bonnets in fibreglass followed soon after, but these were not used on production vehicles until December 1954. The production cost of the fibreglass parts was about the same as those of aluminium, but the parts were said to be both lighter and stronger.

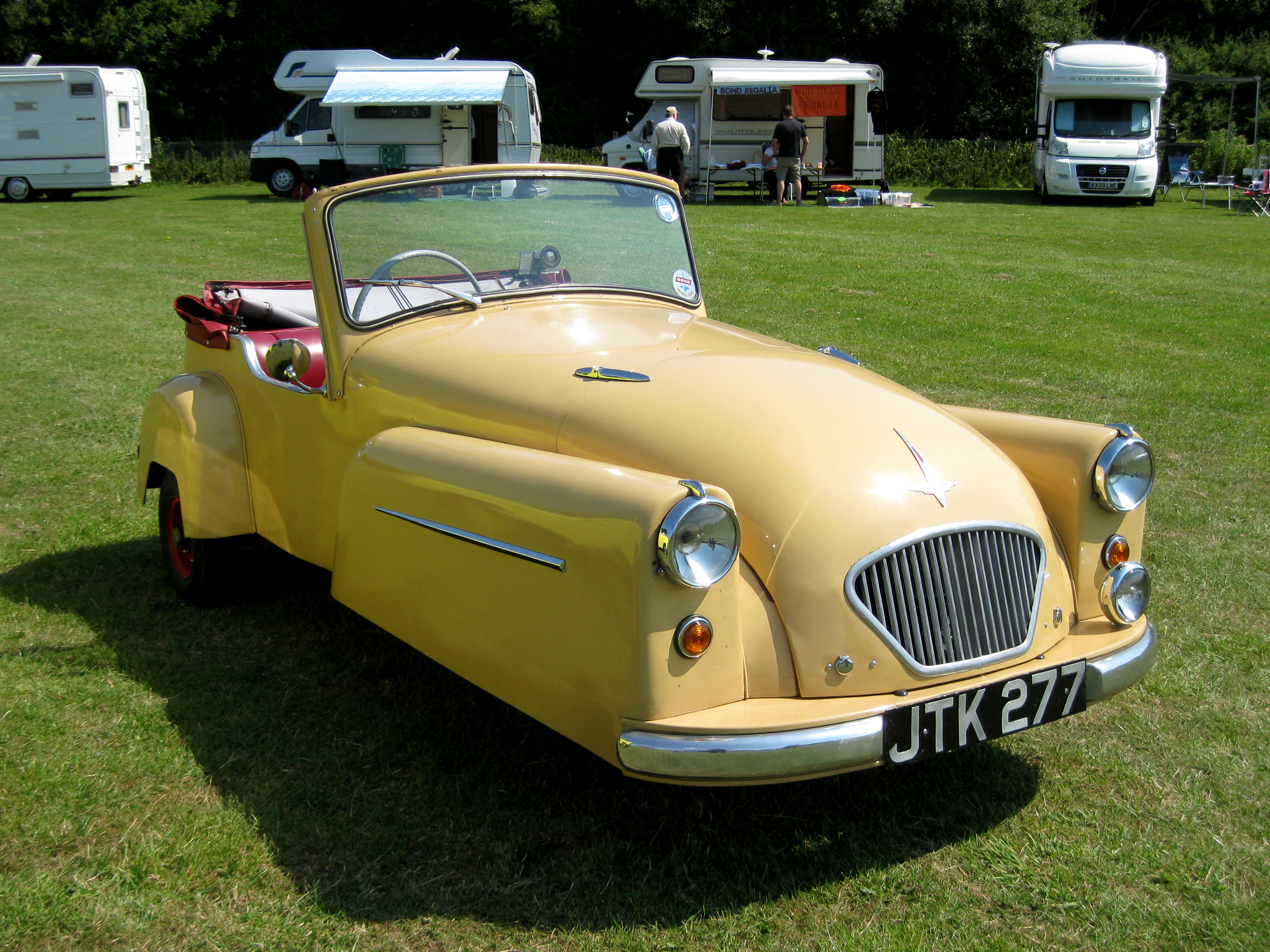
1956 Bond Minicar Mark C Deluxe Tourer showing the later Type II grille

Initially, the Mark C was available only as either the Standard Tourer or the Deluxe Tourer with a single bench seat, seating two or three people. The Deluxe version included an electric starter along with rear bumpers. The range was expanded in March 1954, when the Standard Family Safety and Deluxe Family Safety versions were added. On these models the bodywork was extended behind the front seat and, like the earlier Bond Family Safety Saloon, two child-size inward facing hammock-style seats were added in the gap. Factory advertising material resurrected the Safety label as part of this model's name, but it was generally dropped elsewhere.

The Sharp’s Minitruck continued in production but now incorporated all the new Mark C styling and mechanical features. The last one was made in March 1956.

Attempts were made to penetrate the American market in 1953–54 where the car was marketed by Craven and Hedrick of New York and renamed the Sharp's Bear Cub. However it appears it made little impact and the arrangement was short-lived.

As with previous Minicars, the Mark C was improved and developed over time with numerous minor changes. Most notably, Villiers replaced the 6E engine with the 8E version in June 1953. This had the same overall capacity, but slightly increased performance, now 9 bhp (7 kW; 9 PS). In October 1953 a new Triplex windscreen and surround was introduced, the dashboard glove box was removed, a two-roll seat replaced the earlier round top variety and the old gearchange and steering shaft u/j's were eliminated. Steel was sometimes used for rear wings when supplies of aluminium became difficult to obtain. The following October's updates redesigned the braking system, introduced rear bumpers on the Tourer models and front bumpers for all Deluxes. Several more minor changes in October 1955 were marked by a much more notable change to the shape of the front grille from the familiar oval to a more angular design (designated Type II).

== Minicar Mark D (1956–1958) ==
Bond Minicar Mark D
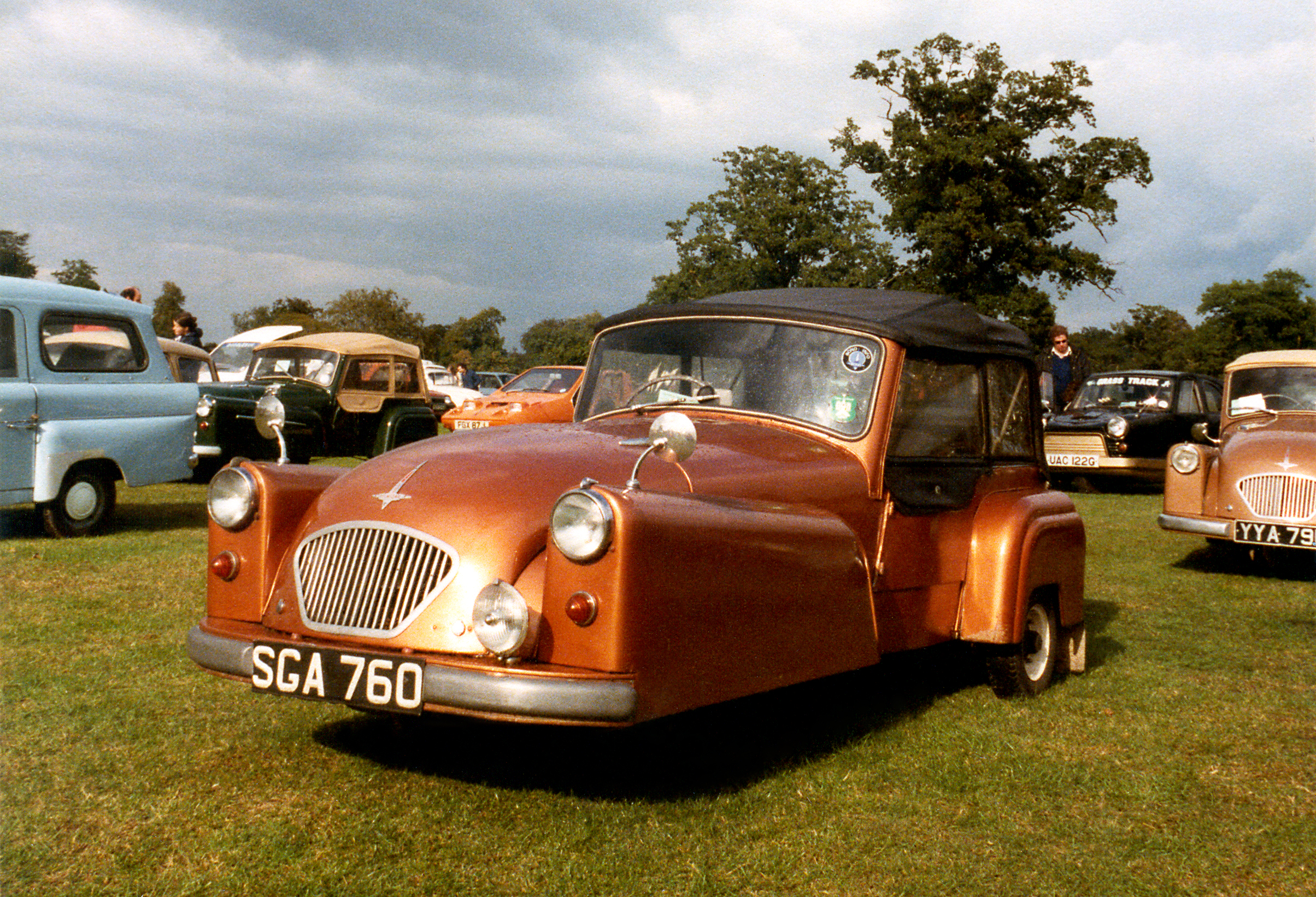
- 1956 Bond Minicar Mark D Deluxe Family Safety

Overview
- Production: 1956–1958; 3,761 made

Body and chassis
- Body style: 1-door convertible; 1-door saloon

Powertrain
- Engine: Villiers 9E 197 cc (12 cu in) single-cylinder 2-stroke
- Transmission: 3-speed manual

Dimensions
- Wheelbase: 5 ft 6 in (1,680 mm)
- Length: 9 ft 10 in (3,000 mm)
- Width: 4 ft 9 in (1,450 mm)
- Height: 4 ft 2 in (1,270 mm)
- Kerb weight: 520 lb (240 kg) Family, 470 lb (210 kg) Tourer

Chronology
- Successor: Bond Minicar Mark F

In May 1956, the Mark C was discontinued and the Mark D introduced. The changes between the last Mark Cs and the Mark D are, like those between the final Mark As and the Mark B, almost entirely hidden from view and the cars are externally identical. Beneath the Mark D bonnet however, Villiers had substantially upgraded the 197 cc (12 cu in) engine, which now became the Mark 9E. The main changes were a 4-plate clutch, a heavier final drive chain with simplified adjustment and a higher top-gear ratio. The 9E was said to produce a 12½ per cent increase in power over the 8E, providing a claimed 8.4 bhp (6 kW; 9 PS) at 4,000 rpm. This increased the cruising speed to around 45 mph (72 km/h), with a top speed of 51 mph (82 km/h). Electrics were upgraded from 6 to 12 volt, allowing more powerful headlights with separate side-lights within the headlamp units. All Deluxe models include the SIBA Dynastart. Other changes which had been gradually introduced onto Mark Cs over the years, were carried over to the Mark D. This included items such as strengthened rear suspension, chrome side flashes on the front wings of Deluxe models and larger rear lights with integrated rear reflectors. As well as the slight weight increase, Sharp's also noted that ground clearance on the Mark D was now only 6.5 in (170 mm) compared to the Mark C's 7 in (180 mm).

Four versions of the car were offered by the factory: the two/three seater Standard Tourer and Deluxe Tourer and the four seat (two adult front seats and two child-size inward facing hammock-style seats) Standard Family Safety and Deluxe Family Safety. The two/three seater models were also available directly from Sharps with a detachable fibreglass hardtop. Similar aftermarket hardtops had been introduced earlier in the year for every type of Minicar from the Mark A to the Mark C Family by the Sharples Engineering Company, who were also based in Preston.

The revised engine was reported to give the Mark D notably better acceleration, better climbing ability and lower fuel consumption in direct comparison with its predecessor. Reverse via the Dynastart unit became an option from October 1956 on the Deluxe models.

With the introduction of the Mark E in December 1957, the two/three seater Mark Ds were dropped from the range as were the hardtops and the Standard version of the Family Safety. The Deluxe Family Safety continued in production alongside the Mark E and by August 1958 still accounted for about 25 per cent of production.

A four-speed gearbox replaced the three-speed version in October 1958 and the model was renamed the Family Tourer.

A final version of the Mark D, the Family Four Saloon was shown at the 1958 Motorcycle show. This car had a lengthened rear wings and tail section and a built-in hardtop with side windows and wrap around rear screen. This version never entered production, and only one is believed to have been produced. Production of all versions of the Mark D ended in November 1958, although the Family Tourer remained listed as "available" until the 1960 range was announced.

== Minicar Mark E (1956–1958) ==
Bond Minicar Mark E
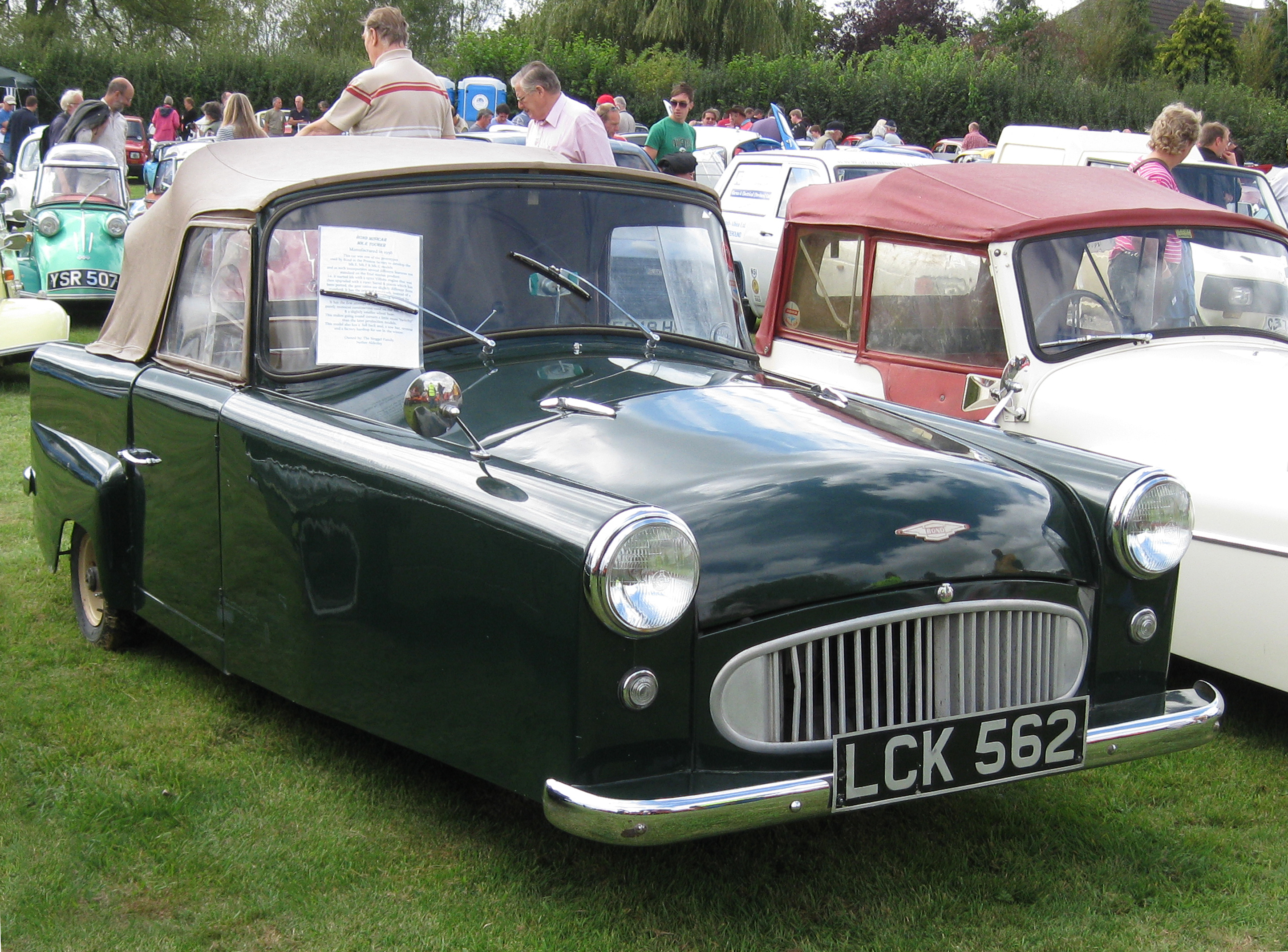
- 1956 Bond Minicar Mark E Prototype (Experimental 12)

Overview
- Production: 1956–1958; 1,189 made

Body and chassis
- Body style: 2-door convertible; 2-door saloon coupe

Powertrain
- Engine: Villiers 9E 197 cc (12 cu in) single-cylinder 2-stroke
- Transmission: 4-speed manual

Dimensions
- Wheelbase: 5 ft 6 in (1,680 mm)
- Length: 11 ft 0 in (3,350 mm)
- Width: 5 ft 0 in (1,520 mm)
- Height: 4 ft 0 in (1,220 mm)
- Kerb weight: 672 lb (305 kg) Tourer & Saloon Coupe

Chronology
- Successor: Bond Minicar Mark F

Announced on 31 October 1956 as a late addition to the 1957 range, the Mark E was radically different in design from any previous Minicar.

A deliberate attempt to introduce "modern car lines", the Mark E introduced semi-monocoque construction, both to improve the resilience of the car and to allow full-height doors to be fitted on both sides. As announced, the prototype car was completely flat-sided and as with previous models used light alloy for all exterior panels. Beneath the skin, there were two main steel frames, one which made up the principal support for the floor, rear suspension and doors and a second which carried the steering assembly and engine. This second frame was described as "semi-floating" to allow the damping out of engine vibrations and to prevent fractures. Further strength was obtained by separating the bonnet from the front grille, allowing the grille frame to add rigidity to the front of the car. Track and overall width of the car were the same as the Mark D, but the wheelbase was extended by 12 in (300 mm). Though not appreciated at the time, this fundamentally affected the car's stability and made it liable to overturn. Weather protection was more sophisticated, the hood now including a front section that could be rolled back as a sunroof while the detachable side screens incorporate sliding windows. The seat was still a single bench, but the backrest was now split, one third allowing for adjustment to suit driver comfort, whilst the remainder hinged forward to allow access to the boot. Lighting was improved with larger headlamps, flashing indicators and rear number plate light. The fuel tank was increased in size to 3.25 imp gal (15 L), but the car retained the Villiers 9E/3 engine with three-speed gearbox. Deliveries of the new car were expected to begin in May 1957.

As things turned out, demand for the Mark D Minicar was such that a decision was made to delay the introduction of the Mark E until later. Despite one of the prototypes being used for an extensive European tour in the summer of 1957 by one magazine, it was not until other pre-production cars were tested by the factory immediately prior to full production that issues with the car's handling were revealed.

The Mark E Tourer was eventually put on the market in December 1957 alongside the Mark D. In production, the Mark E was notably different from its prototype with a shorter wheelbase and wider track to correct the stability issues. Rather than widen the entire car to retain the flat sides of the prototype, the extra track width was accommodated by making the bottom part of the rear wings flare outwards. The rear wheels were also moved forward by approximately 12 in (305 mm). Inside the car, there were changes to the shape of the fibreglass dashboard and the engine was upgraded to the Villiers 9E/4S with four-speed gearbox. Externally, the overriders seen on the pre-production vehicles were removed from both front and rear bumpers and the car now included two windscreen wipers. The maximum speed was now around 50 mph (80 km/h).

In May 1958, a second version of the Mark E became available, the Mark E Saloon Coupe. Externally, because the roof was longer than that on the tourer, this gave the impression that the car was a 2+2, but internally it was the same size, and simply replaced the convertible's soft top with a full-length fibreglass roof. Though not described as a detachable hardtop, the roof could (with a little patience!) be removed in one piece, if desired.

In a publicity stunt for Sharp's, three Bond Minicar Mark Es, (two Saloon Coupes and a Tourer) were the first cars to drive along Britain's first motorway, the Preston By-pass when it opened on the morning of 5 December 1958. The Sales Department thought it would be a good idea for Bonds to be the first in the line-up when the TV cameras recorded the opening (The Bonds were actually not the first to arrive as an Austin Healey Sprite had already beaten them to it. However, after a bit of negotiating and no doubt some financial recompense, the Sprite owner obligingly moved over and the Bonds lined up as planned). The idea was for the first and third cars fitted with only 197 cc engines (driven by Doug Ferriera in LRN 963 and Alan Pounder in car 3) to hold up the traffic by blocking both lanes (the Preston By-pass was only a dual carriageway when it was first opened) whilst the second car, LCK 479 a Tourer driven by John Woods the Production Manager (and fitted with one of the new Villiers 247 cc engines - as available in the new Mark F), would pull out, overtake the first car and speed off into the lead, ready to be photographed by the BBC. The plan backfired, because the Bond beat the camera crew to the bridge where the shot was to take place. Consequently, the evening news only showed the second and third Bonds amongst the traffic on the opening day. Now part of the M6, this event was recreated for the motorway's 50th anniversary by the BBC's Inside Out programme in 2008.

Mark E production ended in November 1958.

== Minicar Mark F (1958–1963) ==
Bond Minicar Mark F
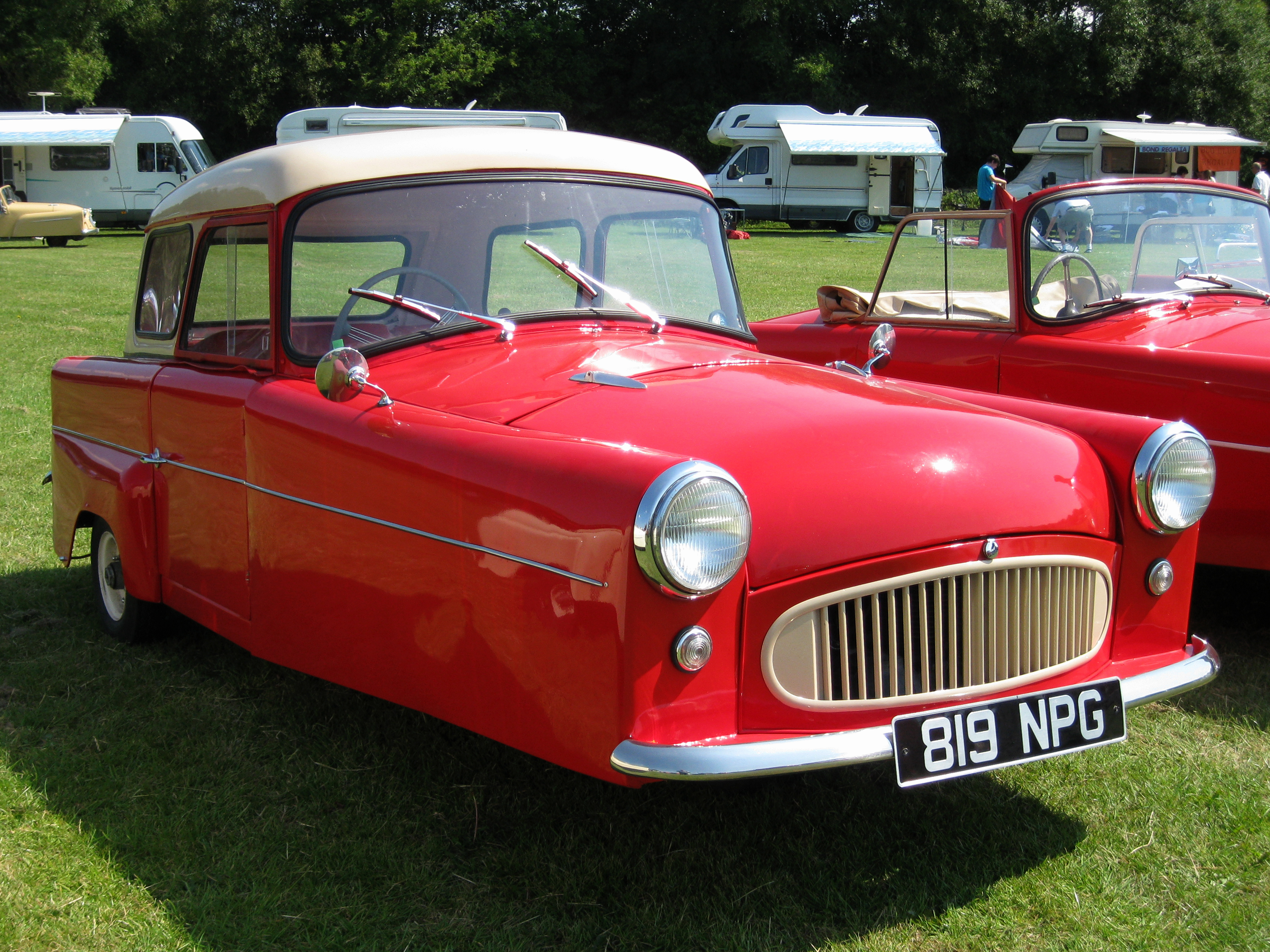
- 1960 Bond Minicar Mark F 4-Seater Family Saloon

Overview
- Production: 1958–1963; 6,493 made

Body and chassis
- Body style: 2-door convertible; 2-door saloon coupe; 2-door saloon; 3-door van

Powertrain
- Engine: Villiers 31A 247 cc (15 cu in) single-cylinder 2-stroke
- Transmission: 4-speed manual

Dimensions
- Wheelbase: 5 ft 6 in (1,680 mm)
- Length: 11 ft 0 in (3,350 mm)
- Width: 5 ft 0 in (1,520 mm)
- Height: 4 ft 0 in (1,220 mm)
- Kerb weight: 672 lb (305 kg) for all models

Chronology
- Successor: Bond Minicar Mark G

The November 1958 London Motorcycle show was used to launch the Minicar Mark F. As with the change from the Mark C to D, the designation was primarily to denote significant mechanical progression from the Mark E rather than any notable difference in the car's external appearance. Three versions of the new model were shown, the Mark F Tourer, the Mark F Saloon Coupe and the Mark F 4-Seater Family Saloon. The Tourer and Coupe were identical to the Mark E versions but the 197 cc (12 cu in) Villiers 9E engine was replaced by a 247 cc (15 cu in) Villiers 31A. Though this engine boasted 12 bhp (9 kW; 12 PS) at 4,500 rpm (an increase of 3.6 bhp (3 kW; 4 PS)), the fuel consumption, dimensions and weight of the unit were almost identical to the 9E. Tests during the summer of 1958 included climbing a 28 per cent gradient "without a struggle" and stop and restart tests two-up on the same slope. Top speed was given as 55 mph (89 km/h) with an average fuel consumption of 60 mpg_{‑imp} (4.7 L/100 km; 50 mpg_{‑US}). The 4-Seater Family Saloon was identical to the Coupe from the outside, but inside, the rear deck was cut back to allow space for a forwards facing hammock style rear seat, just big enough for two children. Unlike the similar seats in the Mark D Family, this could be completely detached for load carrying. All three models offered optional reverse gear.

A fourth model, the Bond Ranger light van was introduced in March 1960. This utilised the body with the cut-out behind the front seats from the Family Saloon and married it with a similar hardtop roof without side windows, but with the addition of an opening flap around the rear window. Very much an economy model, in standard form it came finished in primer with topcoat as an optional extra. A total of 39 cars of this type were recorded in factory production records as a Van rather than a Ranger. This is believed to denote that they were only fitted with a single driver's front seat to increase load capacity, much like the 1952 Minitruck. UK law at the time also meant that this type of lightweight, single-seat three-wheeler could be driven unaccompanied on learner L-plates without the need to pass a driving test.

Production of the Saloon Coupe and the Tourer was discontinued in July 1961, followed by the Family Saloon a month later in August 1961 to make way for the introduction of the new Mark G model. The Ranger continued to be produced alongside the Mark G until it too was discontinued in October 1962.

== Minicar Mark G (1961–1966) ==
Bond Minicar Mark G
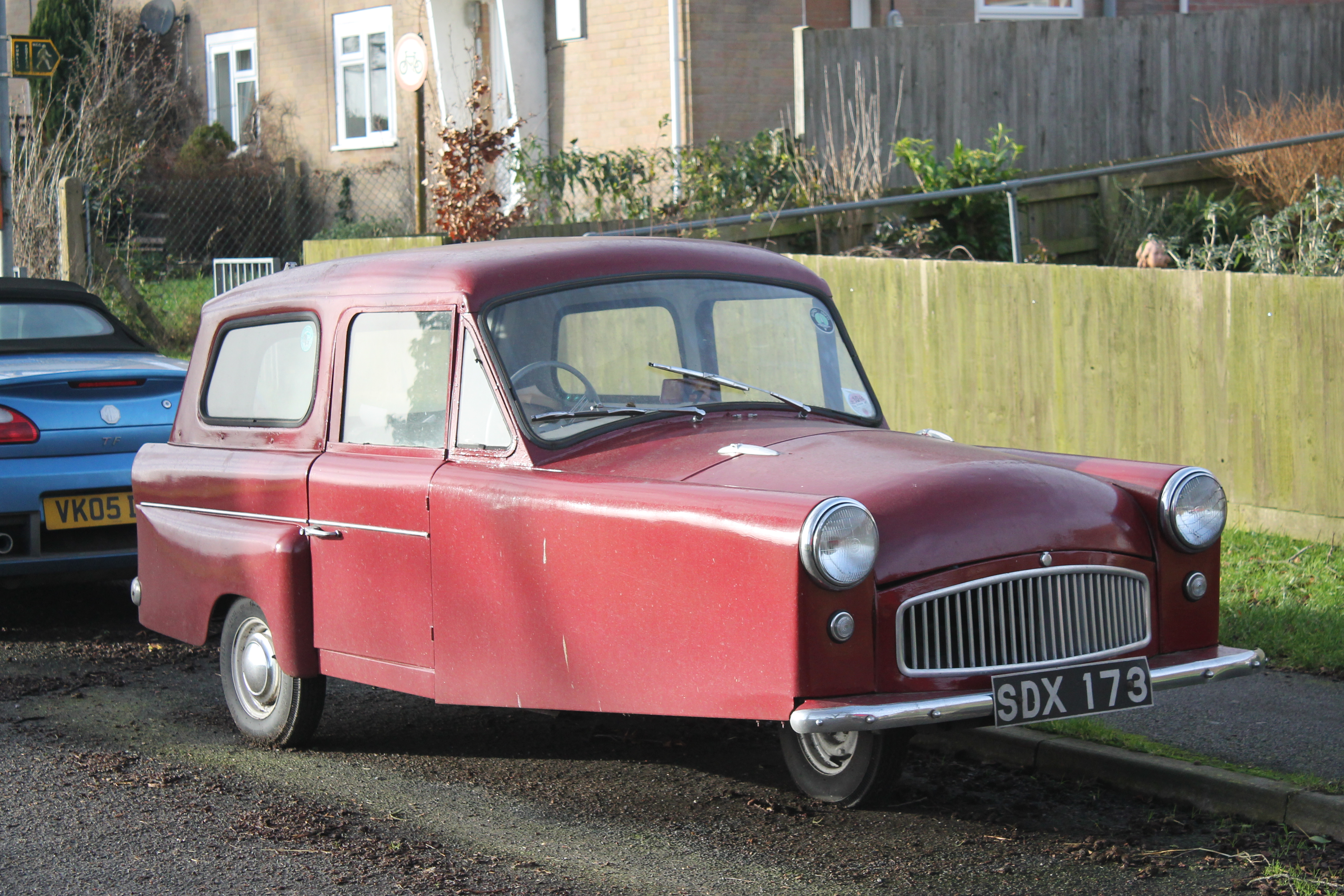
- 1963 Bond Minicar Mark G Estate

Overview
- Production: 1961–1966; 3,253 made

Body and chassis
- Body style: 2-door saloon; 2-door convertible; 3-door estate; 3-door van

Powertrain
- Engine: Villiers 35A 247 cc (15 cu in) single-cylinder 2-stroke or Villiers 4T 247 cc (15 cu in) twin-cylinder 2-stroke
- Transmission: 4-speed manual

Dimensions
- Wheelbase: 5 ft 6 in (1,680 mm)
- Length: 11 ft 0 in (3,350 mm)
- Width: 5 ft 2 in (1,570 mm)
- Height: 4 ft 7 in (1,400 mm)
- Kerb weight: 826 lb (375 kg) for single-cylinder models or 856 lb (388 kg) for twin-cylinder models

Chronology
- Successor: Bond 875

Billed extensively as the "new-line" Minicar, the final evolution of the Bond Minicar was still based to a large extent on the bodyshell of the Mark F. Nevertheless, a revised shape fibreglass roof, new doors, new windscreen with opening quarter lights and bigger wheels largely transformed the car's appearance. However, although the car was similar in layout to the Mark F, almost everything mechanically about the Mark G was different with very few components carried over.

Steel supports around the quarter lights allowed the windscreen to be both more steeply raked and moved forwards to provide more interior room. This also allowed a properly sprung bench-type rear seat to be fitted, capable of seating two adults. The front seats were adjustable for position and the passenger side now folded much further forward than on previous models to allow easier access to the rear, although the doors were still felt to be too narrow for easy entry. Controls were similar to the Mark F, but the fuel tap was now moved from beneath the bonnet to under the dash. Doors were now lockable and included wind-up windows.

Production of the Mark G began in August 1961 and initially the Bond 250 G Minicar was the only version available. The new style roof offered several inches more headroom and incorporated a backward-slanted rear window of the type popularised in the UK by the Ford Anglia. This was initially mirrored by nominal fibreglass tailfins inserted into the aluminium rear wings before the wings became entirely made from fibreglass.

Under the bonnet, the car utilised the new Villiers Mk 35A unit designed specifically for it. A development of the 31A, the new engine incorporated numerous mechanical refinements to improve strength and reliability, albeit slightly at the cost of overall power, now rated at 11.5 bhp (9 kW; 12 PS) at 4,500 rpm. Rear suspension was completely revised, with trailing arm units controlled by Armstrong dampers. The rod and cable brake systems of previous cars was also replaced by a Lockheed semi hydraulic and rod braking system (front brake fully hydraulic, but rear brakes still rod operated from a central floor-mounted hydraulic cylinder) acting on all three wheels. Two further models were added to the range in May 1962 and June 1962 respectively, the Mark G Ranger and the Mark G Estate. The estate featured a large hatchback, hinged at the roof. Inside, the rear seats could also be folded flat or removed entirely. On the Ranger version the rear seats and rear side windows were omitted.

Although public response at the 1962 Motorcycle show remained encouraging, the changes to purchase tax meant there was now a much less significant price difference between the Minicar and other small cars and in November production was scaled back with consequential job losses.

Nevertheless, development continued, and a choice of engines was offered on all models from March 1963. Villiers modified and developed their 249 cc (15 cu in) 2T twin-cylinder engine unit specifically for Bond and this new engine was designated the 4T. It produced (14.6 bhp (11 kW; 15 PS)) at 5,500 rpm and top speed was now said to be "just over" 60 mph (97 km/h) with an average fuel consumption of 58 mpg_{‑imp} (4.9 L/100 km; 48 mpg_{‑US}). Saloon models were fitted with an opening boot from April 1964.

In a bid to stem declining sales, a 2-seat economy version of the Minicar was introduced in October 1964, the Bond Mark G Tourer. This basically used the saloon car body, but with a larger rear deck incorporating an opening boot lid, a folding hood, new fibreglass bonnet, plain door panels, no chrome side trim and non-opening quarter lights. In standard form it came with the 35A engine, but the side trim and 4T engine were available as an option.

Saloon and Tourer production ceased in October and December 1965 respectively, whilst production of the Ranger and the Estate ended in April 1966.

The last ever Minicar produced was an Estate painted only in primer in November 1966. The production records do not show any engine number for this vehicle but it is recorded as being destined for Greece.

== See also ==
- Three-wheeler
- List of motorized trikes
