= Bond Bug =

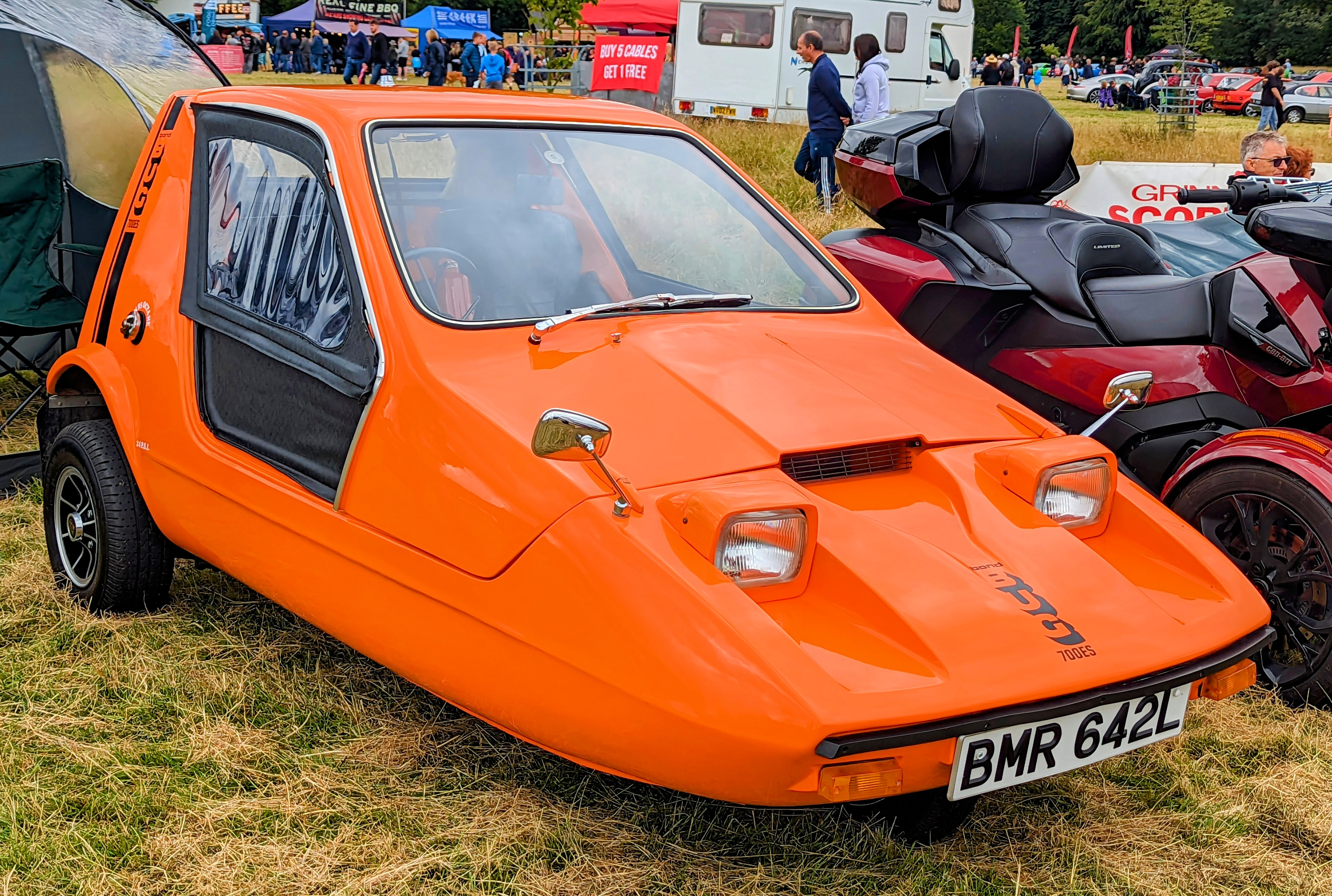

Overview
- Manufacturer: Bond Cars Ltd / Reliant
- Production: 1970–1974; 2,270 made
- Assembly: United Kingdom: Preston, England; United Kingdom: Tamworth, England
- Designer: Tom Karen (Ogle Design)

Body and chassis
- Class: Microcar
- Body style: 1-door coupé
- Doors: Canopy

Powertrain
- Engine: Reliant 700 cc I4, later 750 cc I4
- Transmission: 4-speed manual

Dimensions
- Wheelbase: 6 ft 5 in (1,956 mm)
- Length: 9 ft 2 in (2,794 mm)
- Width: 4 ft 7 in (1,397 mm)
- Height: 4 ft 2 in (1,270 mm)
- Kerb weight: 822 lb (373 kg)

Chronology
- Predecessor: Bond 875

The Bond Bug is a small British two-seat, three-wheeled automobile which was designed by Tom Karen of Ogle Design for Bond Cars, who built it from 1970 to 1974, initially at Bond Cars Ltd factory, but subsequently at Reliant's Tamworth factory. It is a wedge-shaped microcar, with a lift-up canopy and side screens instead of conventional doors.

== History ==
=== Early beginnings ===
Since 1962, when Reliant Motor Company launched the Regal 3/25, the company had tried to make a more sporty version to appeal to younger buyers. Design sketches were done as early as 1964 by Ogle; these sketches are much more wedged-shaped with some rounded edges; the original name for this car was the Reliant Rogue.

The car was never put into production, as management thought that such a strange-looking vehicle might hurt the Reliant brand identity.

=== Bond cars buy out ===
Following the purchase of Bond Cars Ltd. in 1969, Reliant commissioned Tom Karen of Ogle Design to alter the Reliant Rogue design; the car would now become a Bond vehicle. The Bond Bug was based on chief engineer John Crosthwaite's newly designed chassis, and used a mixture of Reliant Regal parts, and running gear which had been designed for the Reliant Robin 750, which was due to be launched in 1974. The original concept was explored by chopping down a production Regal vehicle, the car's rear being shortened to end over the rear axle.

The engine is the front-mounted 700 cc Reliant light-alloy four-cylinder unit. At launch, 29 bhp (22 kW; 29 PS) was claimed for the less expensive 700 and 700E models. The more upmarket 700ES incorporates a redesigned cylinder head, which permitted the compression ratio to be increased from 7.35:1 to 8.4:1. This provided a power increase to 31 bhp (23 kW; 31 PS) as well as improved torque for the then range-topping 700ES.

The Bond Bug 700ES also offers more ergonomic seats, as well as more padding over the engine cowl, twin mudflaps, an ashtray, a rubber front bumper and a spare wheel.

=== Launch and production run ===
The car had an upbeat launch, at which Reliant's Ray Wiggin stated: "The fact it has three wheels is quite incidental. It's a new form of transport. So now, in fact, we think it's going to appeal to a much wider section of the market than we originally envisaged."

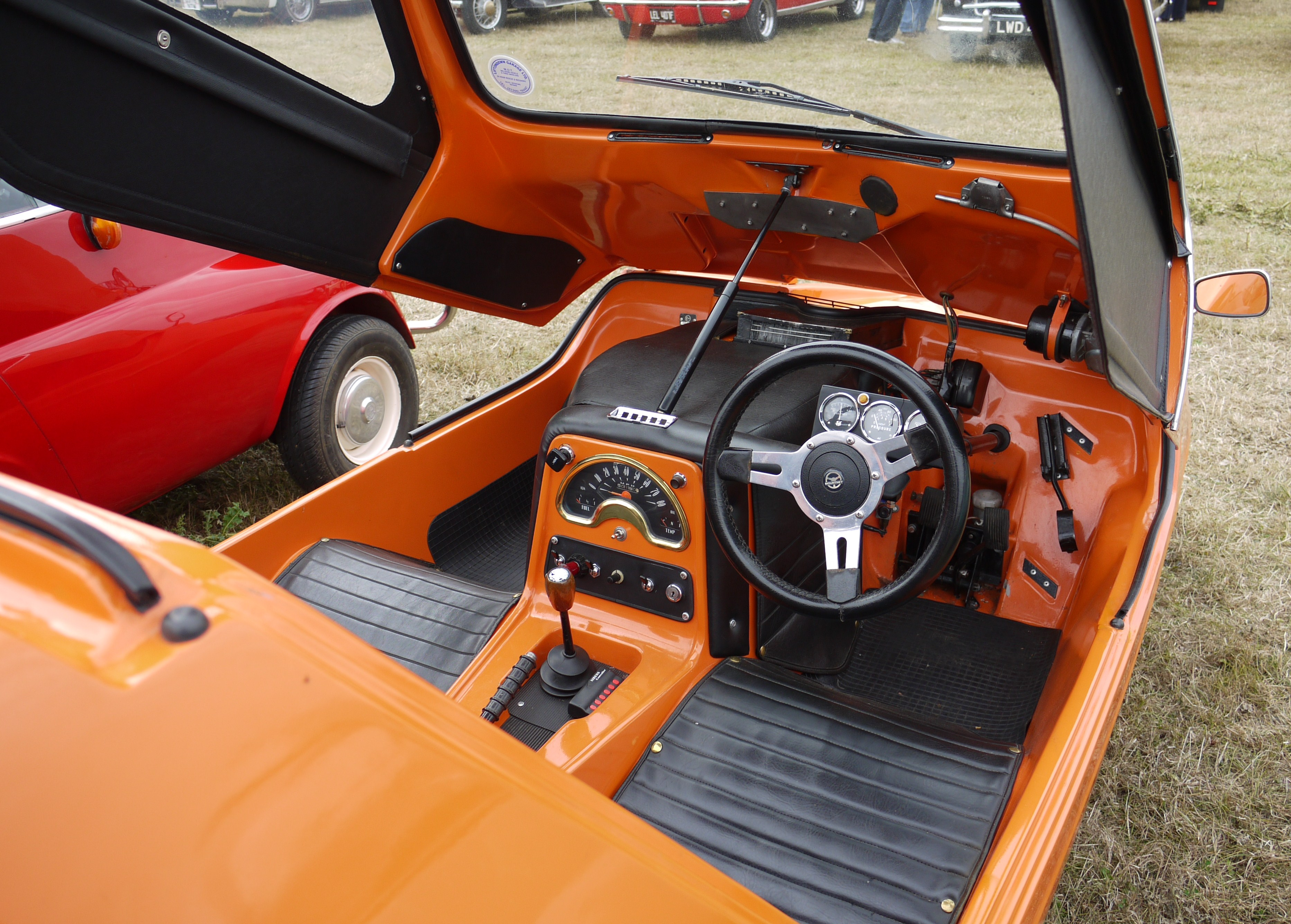
Bond Bug (interior), with the original bright orange tangerine colour on exterior

The Bug was available in a bright orange tangerine colour, although six white Bugs were produced for a Carreras Rothmans 'Cambridge' cigarette promotion, registration AME191H through to AME196H – one of which was also used in an advertisement for Cape Fruit of which AME191H was used as the main vehicle, Only three Carreras Rothmans Bugs are known to exist, and, according to the most recently available information, all three are registered in South Yorkshire.

In contrast to the image of three-wheeled Reliants as being slow, the Bond Bug was capable of 76 mph (122 km/h), in excess of the UK national speed limit (70 mph/112.6 km/h), and comparable to small saloon cars such as the basic 850 cc Mini (72 mph/116 km/h) and the Hillman Imp (80 mph/128 km/h). For this, the Bond Bug would get an altered Regal Regal speedo with a top speed of 100mph on the regal it only went up to 80mph.

The Bond Bug was sold as being fun to drive, with the low seating position giving a similar exaggerated impression of speed as in a go-kart.

The Bug was, however, no cheaper than more practical cars. It cost £629, while a basic 850 cc Mini, a four-seater much faster round corners but with considerably inferior acceleration, cost £620. The Bond Bug was often compared to a basic mini even though the vehicles were completely different.

Reliant launched the Bond Bug 750 in late 1973 but production ended after fewer than 200 Bug 750s were sold, as Reliant ended all other production lines so more capacity could be made open to build more of the newly launched Reliant Robin 750 to keep up with demand.

=== Further development ===
Even though the Bond Bug ended production with little fanfare, Reliant continued development into the 1970s; prototype 4-wheeled Bond Bugs were made before the launch of the Reliant Kitten, as they thought a 4 wheeled version might have more appeal to the market. The code name FW9 was used for the 4-wheeled Bond Bug design studies, later leading to a prototype of a strange coupe that looked very different from the Bond Bug. All this design was done by Ogle, but Reliant management never took it any further.

A larger engine was also in development with BRM for the car too; this was a standard 850cc engine block with an overhead camshaft design; this engine would also gain twin SU carburettors and an electric fuel pump; the engine in standard tune would give 70hp. The engine was meant to be shared with a small production sports car that Reliant never finished developing.

=== Webster Bug ===
Mike and Gary Webster between them managed to acquire the original Bug moulds from Reliant Motor Company in 1990 with a licence for the design, and formed the "Webster Motor Company".

They decided to produce 4-wheeled Bugs as a "Kit car", so you would build the vehicle yourself. The kit asked you to buy a Reliant Robin or Rialto for the majority of donor parts, or the whole car could be supplied as one kit with a mixture of new and refurbished parts.

To allow the Bug to have 4 wheels, the ladder chassis was cut down at the front, with a Mini front subframe welded in place. The moulds were also changed to have two large arches at the front. Different models were developed, including convertible versions that had no lift-up canopy with small screens, or a standard car which had fibreglass doors instead of the original vinyl doors, to keep the driver warm and dry.

They also produced a small number of 3-wheeled Webster Bugs

Under 30 kits were known to be sold.

=== Reliant Sprint ===
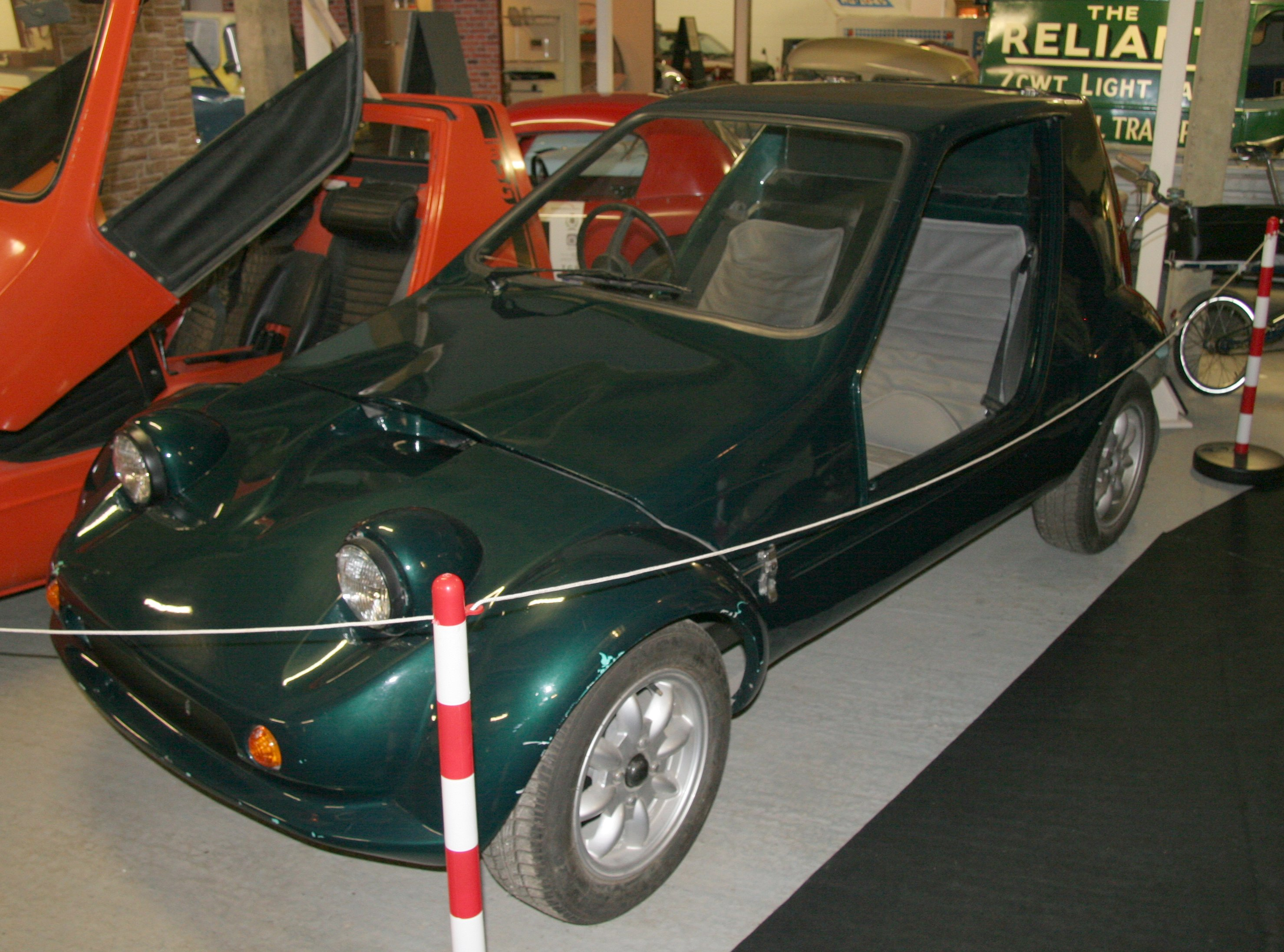
Reliant Sprint prototype

In 1994, Reliant unveiled the "Reliant Sprint"; this car was a complete redesign of the original Bond Bug. Tom Karen of Ogle design rounded off all the sharp edges of the Bug and added round headlights, giving the car a totally new look; the prototype had Minilite alloy wheels, a grey vinyl interior, and was bright yellow. The Sprint used, in effect, a Reliant Robin chassis cut in half, with the rear half made to use the original suspension set up of the Bond Bug. Similarly, the interior used many of the current Robin switches and dials, to keep production costs low.

As shown in the Trouble At The Top TV show, Reliant Management wouldn't allow Jonathan Haynes to put the Sprint into production, as they had little faith that, in the 1990s, it would sell in any large numbers, even though it would cost as little as £12,500 to start production.

More developments were made on the Sprint until 1998 when Reliant would try to get it production-ready as a 4-wheeled sports car. Andy Plumb would redesign the car, now renamed/code named internally "the Clubman", in 2 different 4-wheeled models: a standard car and a convertible. These cars had huge bubble-shaped front and rear arches. Again more prototypes were produced; the chassis was redesigned once more with double-wishbone front suspension, and because the car was a 4-wheeler, the 850cc engine was redesigned to take fuel injection and a catalytic converter. Even though prototypes were promising, Reliant Motor Company wouldn't pay for further development, and the project died.

== Popular culture ==
Tom Karen oversaw the design and production of Luke Skywalker's landspeeder from Star Wars (1977): one of the models was built upon the chassis of a Bond Bug – the wheels hidden by mirrors angled slightly to the ground.

In the television series The Grand Tour, presenters Richard Hammond and James May transformed a Bond Bug into an amphibious vehicle, dubbing it the "Pond Bug"; driven by Jeremy Clarkson, the car broke the UK water speed record in the "experimental amphibious unlimited class", reaching a speed of 47.81 mph at Coniston Water.

The Ibishu Wigeon, a model available in the driving simulation video game BeamNG.drive, is based on the Bond Bug.

== Gallery ==
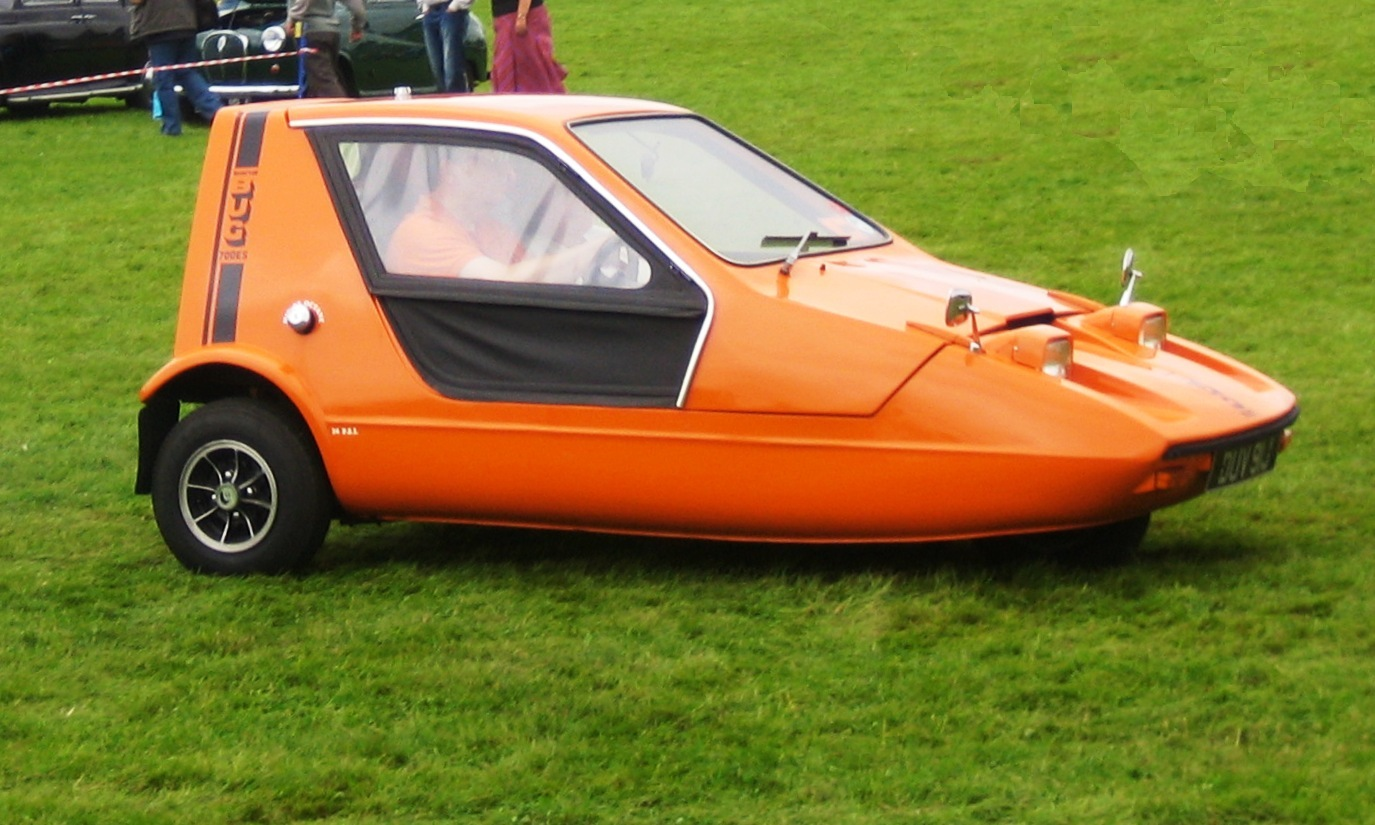
Bond Bug side view with the canopy closed

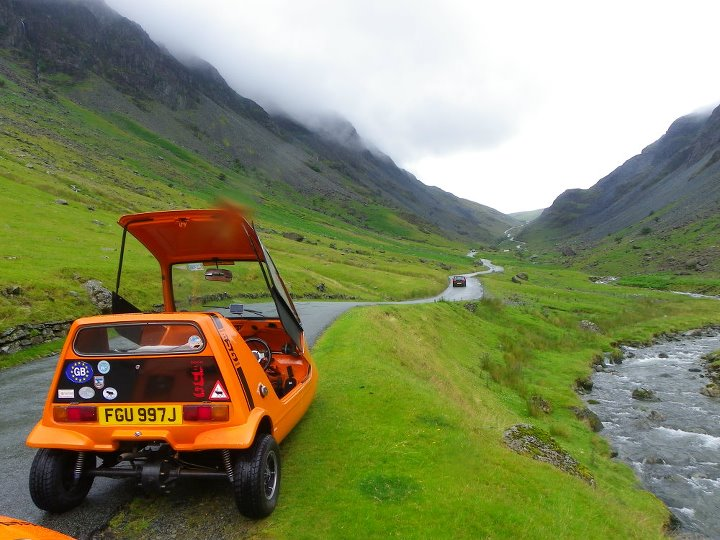
Bond Bug with the canopy open and Honister Pass in View

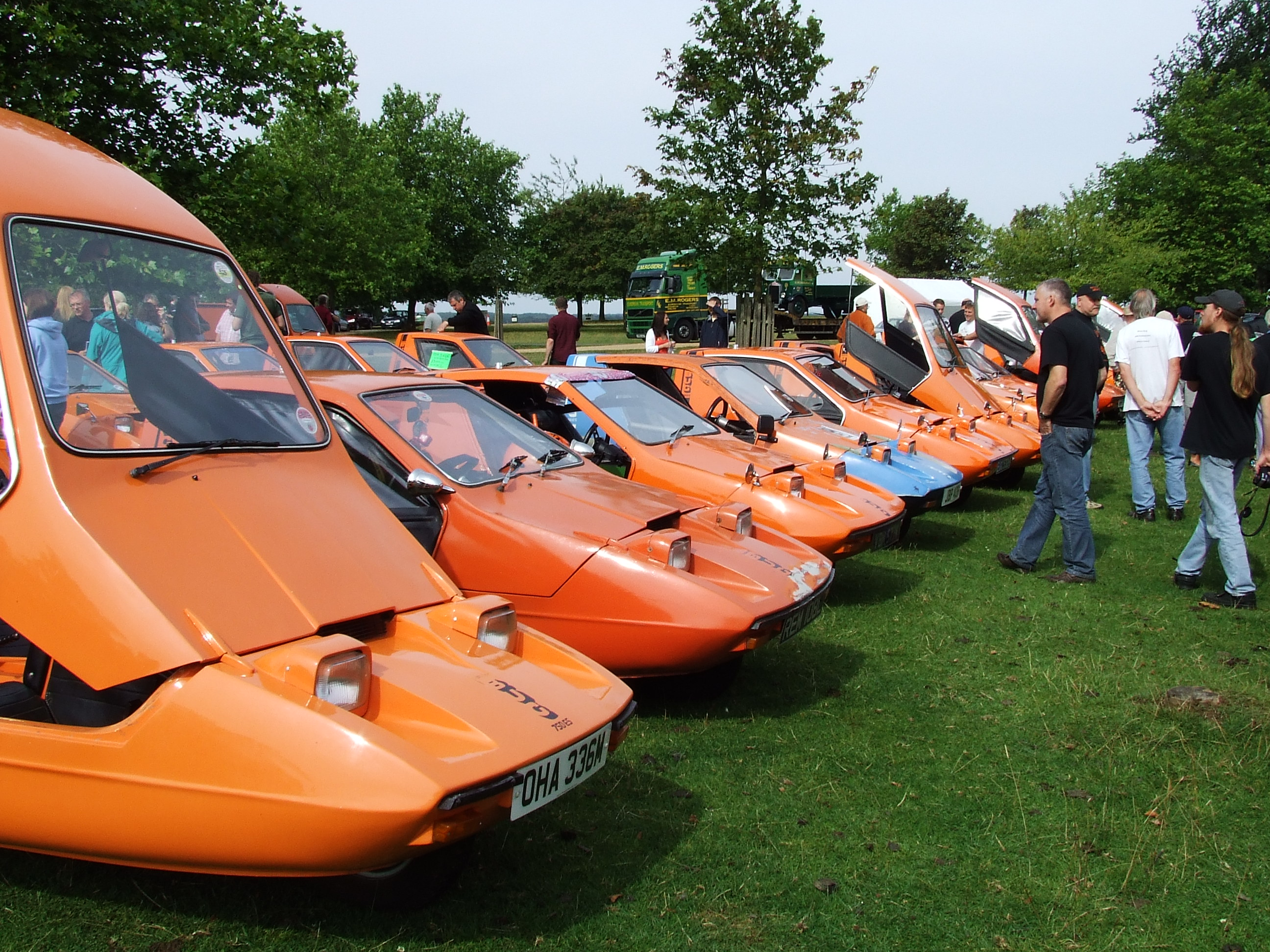
Bond Bug 40th Anniversary gathering at Woburn Abbey, 2010

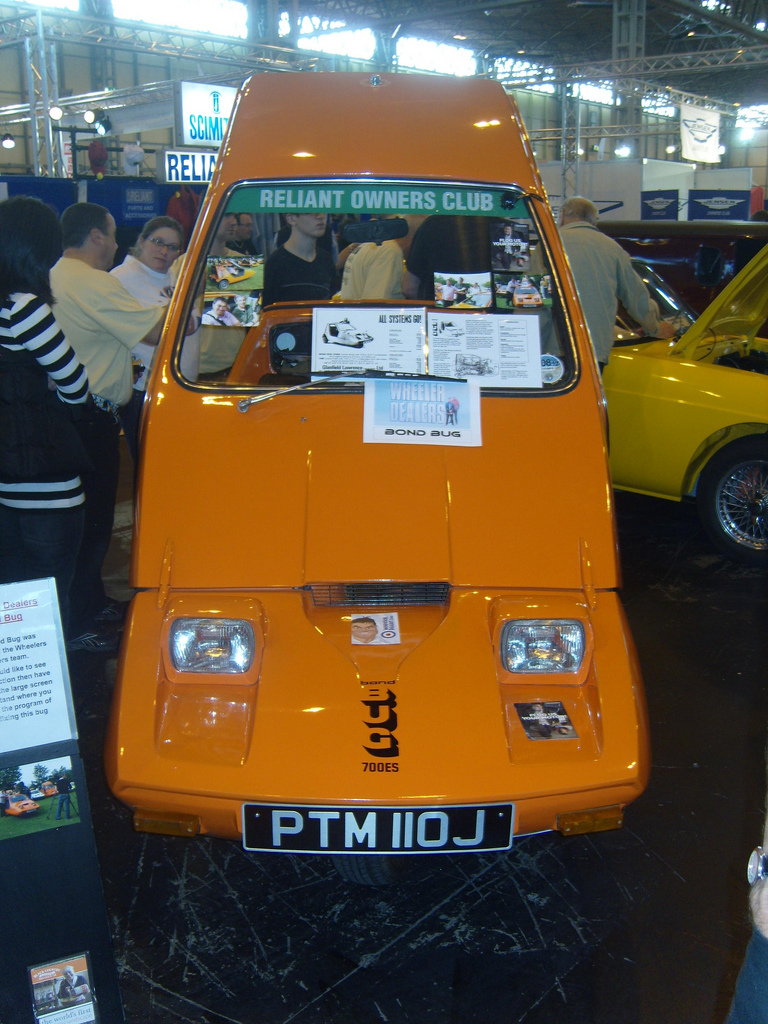
Bond Bug on the Reliant Stand at the 2011 NEC Classic Car Show in

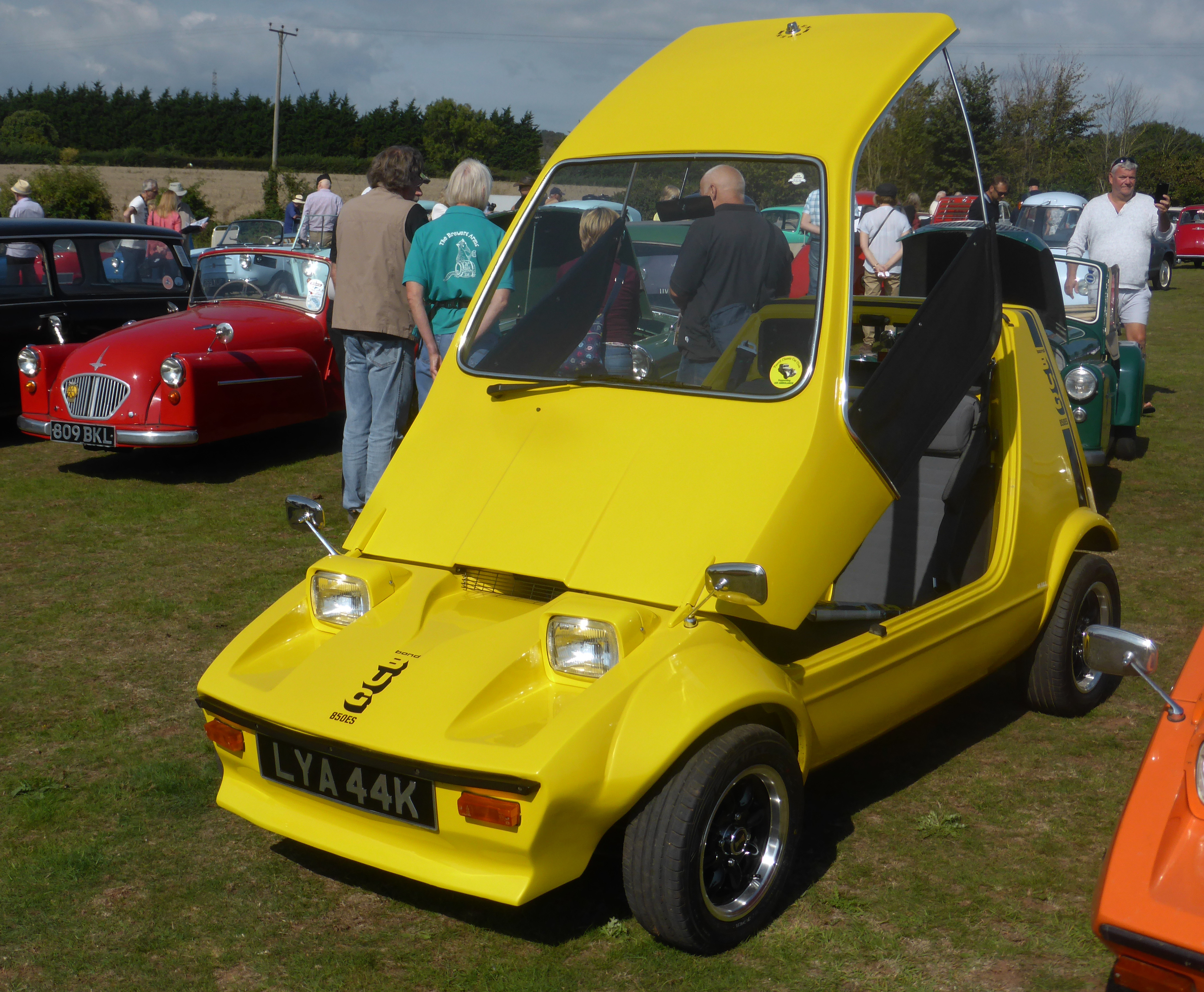
Bond Bug 4 wheeler

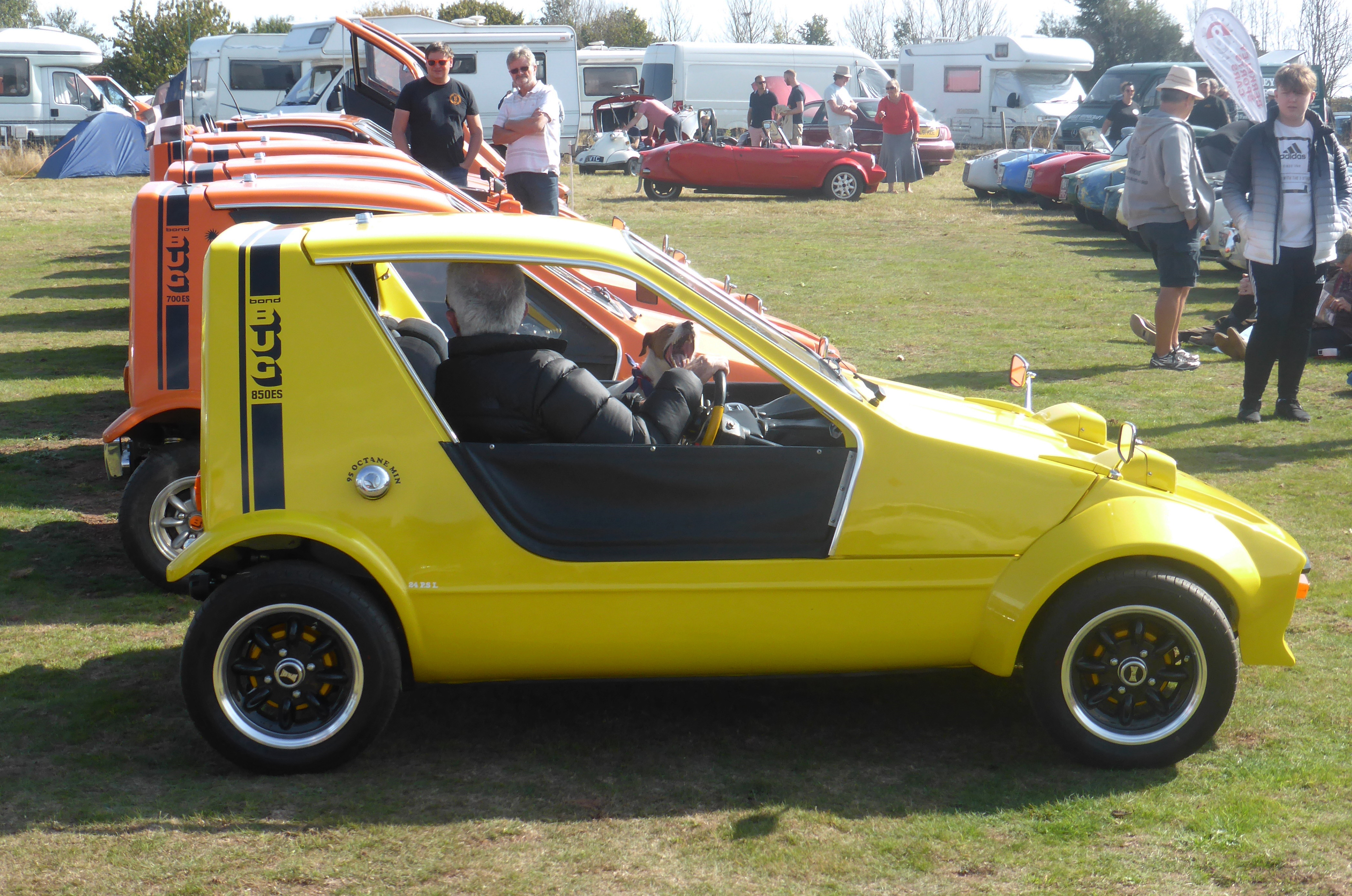
Bond Bug 4 wheeler side view

== See also ==
- Three-wheeler
- List of motorized trikes
