= SIBA Elektrik G.m.b.H =

Former German car electrical manufacturer

SIBA Elektrik G.m.b.H is a former German automotive electrical manufacturer, noted as manufacturers of the Dynastart combined starter motor and dynamo, used on many cars, motorcycles and scooters in the 1950s and notable for providing an electric method of reversing, when attached to a two-stroke engine, the engine's running direction, thus providing a way to reverse a vehicle without a reverse gear in the gearbox. A British company SIBA Electric Ltd was established in 1954 to import the Dynastart units, eventually manufacturing themselves from 1957. The German company was sold to BOSCH in 1957, whilst the British company was taken over by Lucas in the same year.
