= Lawrie Bond =

British automobile designer (1907–1974)

Lawrence Bond (2 August 1907 – September 1974) was a British engineer and designer noted for designing several economical and lightweight vehicles, amongst which were the Bond Minicar, the Berkeley and the Bond Equipe GT.

Bond was born in Preston, Lancashire on 2 August 1907. His father was Frederick Charles Bond, a local historian and artist. After attending Preston Grammar School, Bond worked for a variety of engineering firms, notably the Blackburn Aircraft Company during the Second World War. He then went on to enjoy modest success as an amateur racing driver and racing car designer using knowledge gained from the aircraft industry of lightweight, stressed skin construction. In 1948 he designed a small three-wheeled car for road use; this gained media -attention highlighting the design's commercial potential and provided the basis for the Bond Minicar.

In later life Bond ran a pub near Bowes in the North Riding of Yorkshire (since 1974 in County Durham) where he combined the role of freelance designer with that of publican. Later, ill health resulted in a return to Ansdell, Lancashire, where he died in September 1974, aged 67.
