= List of microcars by country of origin: U =

== List ==
Country	Automobile Name	Manufacturer	Engine Make/Capacity	Seats	Year	Other information
United Kingdom	AC Petite (Mark 1)	AC Cars Ltd, Thames Ditton	Villiers 346 cc	2	1953-1955	
United Kingdom	AC Petite Mark 2	AC Cars Ltd, Thames Ditton	Villiers 346 cc	2	1955-1958	The Mark 2 has minor trim differences to the Mark 1, a more powerful engine and equally sized front and rear wheels
United Kingdom	AC	AC Cars Ltd, Thames Ditton	Steyr-Daimler-Puch 500 cc	4	1971	AC made three prototype cars based on their Model 70 invalid carriage
United Kingdom	Allard Clipper	Allard Motor Co Ltd, Clapham	Villiers 346 cc	3 + 2 children in dicky seat	1954-1955	
United Kingdom	Astra Utility	Astra Car Co Ltd, Hampton Hill	British Anzani 322 cc	2	1956-1959	Originally produced by JARC as the 'Little Horse', the Astra Utility had a more distinctive grille and larger engine
United Kingdom	Berkeley 'Sports' SA322	Berkeley cars Ltd, Biggleswade, Beds	British Anzani 322 cc	2	1956	
United Kingdom	Berkeley 'Sports' SA328	Berkeley cars Ltd, Biggleswade, Beds	Excelsior 328 cc	2	1957-1958	
United Kingdom	Berkeley 'Sports' SE492	Berkeley cars Ltd, Biggleswade, Beds	Excelsior 492 cc	2	1957-1959	
United Kingdom	Berkeley T60	Berkeley cars Ltd, Biggleswade, Beds	Excelsior 328 cc	2	1959-1961	
United Kingdom	Berkeley T60/4	Berkeley cars Ltd, Biggleswade, Beds	Excelsior 328 cc	2+2	1960-1961	
United Kingdom	Berkeley B95	Berkeley cars Ltd, Biggleswade, Beds	Royal Enfield 692 cc	2	1959-1960	
United Kingdom	Berkeley B105	Berkeley cars Ltd, Biggleswade, Beds	Royal Enfield 692 cc	2	1959-1960	
United Kingdom	Berkeley QB95	Berkeley cars Ltd, Biggleswade, Beds	Royal Enfield 692 cc	2	1959-1960	
United Kingdom	Berkeley QB105	Berkeley cars Ltd, Biggleswade, Beds	Royal Enfield 692 cc	2	1959-1960	
United Kingdom	Berkeley Foursome	Berkeley cars Ltd, Biggleswade, Beds	Excelsior 492 cc	4	1958-1960	
United Kingdom	Blériot-Whippet	Air Navigation and Engineering Company, Addlestone, Surrey	Blackburne 997 cc	2; later version 3/4	1920-1927	
United Kingdom	B.M.A Hazelcar	Battery Manufacturing Association, Hove, Sussex	electric motor 1.5 hp (1 kW)	2	1952-1957	
United Kingdom	Bond Minicar (Mark A)	Sharp's Commercials Ltd, Preston, Lancashire	Villiers 122 cc	2	1949-1951	
United Kingdom	Bond Minicar Deluxe Tourer (Mark A)	Sharp's Commercials Ltd, Preston, Lancashire	Villiers 197 cc	2	1949-1951	
United Kingdom	Bond Minicar Mark B	Sharp's Commercials Ltd, Preston, Lancashire	Villiers 197 cc	2	1951-1952	
United Kingdom	Sharp’s Minitruck (Mark B)	Sharp's Commercials Ltd, Preston, Lancashire	Villiers 197 cc	1	1952-1953	
United Kingdom	Sharp’s Minivan	Sharp's Commercials Ltd, Preston, Lancashire	Villiers 197 cc	2	1952	
United Kingdom	Bond Minicar Mark B, Family "Safety Saloon"	Sharp's Commercials Ltd, Preston, Lancashire	Villiers 197 cc	2+2	1952	
United Kingdom	Bond Minicar Mark C	Sharp's Commercials Ltd, Preston, Lancashire	Villiers 197 cc	2	1952-1956	
United Kingdom	Sharpe's Minitruck Mark C	Sharp's Commercials Ltd, Preston, Lancashire	Villiers 197 cc	1	1953-1956	
United Kingdom	Bond Minicar Mark C, Family Safety Model	Sharp's Commercials Ltd, Preston, Lancashire	Villiers 197 cc	2+2	1954-1956	
United Kingdom	Bond Minicar Mark D	Sharp's Commercials Ltd, Preston, Lancashire	Villiers 197 cc	2	1956-1958	
United Kingdom	Bond Minicar Mark D, Family Safety Model/Family Tourer	Sharp's Commercials Ltd, Preston, Lancashire	Villiers 197 cc	2+2	1956-1958	
United Kingdom	Bond Minicar Mark E	Sharp's Commercials Ltd, Preston, Lancashire	Villiers 197 cc	3	1956-1958	
United Kingdom	Bond Minicar Mark E, 3 seater Saloon Coupe	Sharp's Commercials Ltd, Preston, Lancashire	Villiers 197 cc	3	1958	
United Kingdom	Bond Minicar, Tourer (Mark F)	Sharp's Commercials Ltd, Preston, Lancashire	Villiers 250 cc	3	1958-1961	
United Kingdom	Bond Minicar, Saloon Coupe (Mark F)	Sharp's Commercials Ltd, Preston, Lancashire	Villiers 250 cc	3	1958-1961	
United Kingdom	Bond Minicar, Family Saloon (Mark F)	Sharp's Commercials Ltd, Preston, Lancashire	Villiers 250 cc	2+2	1958-1961	
United Kingdom	Bond Ranger (Mark F)	Sharp's Commercials Ltd, Preston, Lancashire	Villiers 250 cc	2	1960-1962	
United Kingdom	Bond Ranger Van (Mark F)	Sharp's Commercials Ltd, Preston, Lancashire	Villiers 250 cc	1	1960-1962	
United Kingdom	Bond 250G (Mark G)	Sharp's Commercials Ltd, Preston, Lancashire	Villiers 250 cc	4	1961-1965	
United Kingdom	Bond 250G Estate (Mark G)	Sharp's Commercials Ltd, Preston, Lancashire	Villiers 250 cc	4	1962-1966	
United Kingdom	Bond Ranger (Mark G)	Sharp's Commercials Ltd, Preston, Lancashire	Villiers 250 cc	1	1962-1966	
United Kingdom	Bond Tourer (Mark G)	Sharp's Commercials Ltd, Preston, Lancashire	Villiers 250 cc	3	1964-1966	
United Kingdom	Bond Bug	Reliant Motors Co Ltd, Tamworth, Staffordshire	Reliant 700 cc	2	1970-1974	
United Kingdom	BSA Ladybird	BSA, Small Heath, Birmingham	BSA Sunbeam 250 cc	2	1958-1960	Two prototypes built
United Kingdom	CLEVER	University of Bath, Centre for Power Transmission and Motion Control (PTMC), Bath, Somerset	Rotax 218 cc	2	2006	Prototype, now undergoing development with BMW
United Kingdom	Colliday Chariot 50/Commuter 350	Robert Collier Engineering Ltd, Sutton Coldfield	BSA Motorcycle engines 49 cc or 348 cc	2 adults and children	1961-1969	3 Wheeled bubblecars with rear mounted engines and automatic gearboxes. Top speed 45 kmh. The petrol engine had a simple control: starterswitch key, steering wheel and two (GO and STOP) foot pedals. The turning circle was only 210 cm.
United Kingdom	Cooper	Cooper Car Co Ltd, Surbiton, Surrey	500 cc		1947-1951	
United Kingdom	Coronet	Coronet Cars Ltd, Denham, Buckinghamshire	British Anzani 328 cc	2	1947-1951	
United Kingdom	Dogood zero	Dogood Motors, London	Electric motor 3 hp	2	2024-	Was the U.K.'s cheapest new car when released
United Kingdom	Eaglet	Silent Transport Ltd, Woking, Surrey	electric motor		1948	The company also converted Opel Kadetts and Fiat Topolinos to electric power
United Kingdom	E.E.C.	Electrical Engineering Construction Co Ltd, Totnes, Devon	Excelsior 250 cc		1952-1954	Also known as the "Workers' Playtime"
United Kingdom	Enfield 8000	Enfield Automotive Ltd, London	electric motor	2	1969-1976	production later transferred from Isle of Wight to island of Syros (Greece)
United Kingdom	Fairthorpe Atom Mark I	Fairthorpe Ltd, Chalfont St Peter, Buckinghamshire	BSA 248 cc	2+2	1954-1956	About fifty produced including three unique vehicles; a convertible, a Wagonette van and a narrowed version
United Kingdom	Fairthorpe Atom Mark II	Fairthorpe Ltd, Chalfont St Peter, Buckinghamshire	BSA 348 cc	2+2	1954-1956	Model listed in manufacturers literature, but none are believed to have been built. A Mark IIa version with a 322 cc British Anzani engine was also tested
United Kingdom	Fairthorpe Atom Mark III	Fairthorpe Ltd, Chalfont St Peter, Buckinghamshire	BSA 646 cc	2+2	1954-1956	Only one car is said to have been built
United Kingdom	Fairthorpe Atomata	Fairthorpe Ltd, Chalfont St Peter, Buckinghamshire	BSA 646 cc	2	1957-1958	
United Kingdom	Meadows Frisky	Henry Meadows (Vehicles) Ltd, Wolverhampton, Staffordshire	Villiers 250 cc	2	1957	Prototype with gull-wing doors
United Kingdom	Friskysport	Henry Meadows (Vehicles) Ltd, Wolverhampton, Staffordshire	Villiers 324 cc	2	1957-1964	
United Kingdom	Frisky Coupé	Henry Meadows (Vehicles) Ltd, Wolverhampton, Staffordshire	Villiers 324 cc	2	1957-1964	
United Kingdom	Friskysprint	Frisky Cars Ltd, Wolverhampton, Staffordshire	Excelsior 492 cc	2	1958	Prototype. A similar car was eventually produced as the Zeta Sports
United Kingdom	Frisky Family Three	Henry Meadows (Vehicles) Ltd, Wolverhampton, Staffordshire	Excelsior 246 cc or Villiers 197 cc	2	1958-1964	
United Kingdom	Frisky Prince	Henry Meadows (Vehicles) Ltd, Wolverhampton, Staffordshire	Excelsior 328 cc or Villiers 324 cc	4	1959-1964	
United Kingdom	Gill Getabout	Gill Cars of Paddington	British Anzani 322 cc	2	1958-1960	The car was based upon the chassis from the Astra car and eventually went on to form the basis of the Zeta Sedan
United Kingdom	Isetta	Brighton railway works, Brighton	BMW 298 cc	2	1957-1962	Assembled in Brighton under license from BMW.
United Kingdom	JARC 'Little Horse'	JARC Motors Ltd, Isleworth	Excelsior 250 cc	2	1955	Subsequently produced by a subsidiary of British Anzani as the Astra Utility
United Kingdom	Opperman Unicar	Factory at Elstree, Hertfordshire	Anzani, then 328 cc Excelsior	2+2	1956-1959	2 Prototypes of the 'Stirling' also built
United Kingdom	Peel Manxcar	Peel Engineering Company, Isle of Man	Anzani 250 cc	2+2	1955	prototype saloon car;
United Kingdom	Peel P50	Peel Engineering Company, Isle of Man; 2010: Peel Engineering Ltd. Sutton-in-Ashfield	1962-1964: DKW 49 cc / 2010: 49 cc Petrol or 2.3 kW Electric	1	1962-1964; 2010-	The P50 holds the record as smallest ever production car; 2010 prototypes not road legal, 2011 on new road legal petrol & electric versions produced
United Kingdom	Peel P50	Bamby Cars, Kingston-upon-Hull		1	1984	
United Kingdom	Peel Trident	Peel Engineering Company, Isle of Man	DKW 49 cc, some with Triumph Tina 99 cc engine	1 + 1	1965-1966	"The Terrestrial Flying Saucer" NB the later mini-based Peel Viking Sport was not a microcar
United Kingdom	Powerdrive	Powerdrive Ltd, Wood Green, London	Anzani 322 cc	2	1955-1957	larger than other cars in this class, with full-size 13-inch wheels
United Kingdom	Qpod	Unique Motor Company	50 cc			UK branded ATV by SECMA (France)
United Kingdom	Reliant Robin	Reliant Motor Company, Tamworth	748 cc and 848 cc	4	1973-2002	Also licence-built in Greece and India
United Kingdom	Rodley	Rodley Automobile Company, Rodley	JAP 750 cc	4	1954-1956	Built in Rodley, Leeds
United Kingdom	Russon	Russon Cars Ltd	Excelsior 250 cc	3	1951-1952	
United Kingdom	Scootacar	Hunslet Engine Company	Villiers 197 and 250 cc	2	1957-1964	Made in Hunslet, Leeds
United Kingdom	Sinclair C5	Sinclair Vehicles, Merthyr Tydfil, Wales	Battery electric vehicle	1	1985	14,000 made 5,000 sold before manufacturer went into receivership
United Kingdom	Tourette	Progress Supreme Co Ltd, Purley, London	Villiers197 cc	2	1956-1958	
United Kingdom	Trojan	Trojan, Croydon and for a while Kingston-on-Thames	Heinkel 198 cc 4-stroke ohv single	2	1960-1965	(Licence built version of the Heinkel)
United States	Airway	T.P. Hall Engineering Co, San Diego	Onan 10hp	3	1949-1950	
United States	Airscoot	Aircraft Products, Wichita, Kansas	2.6 hp		1947	
United States	American Buckboard	American Buckboard Corporation, Los Angeles			1955-1956	Simple, open car, a revival of the 5-wheel Briggs & Stratton Flyer. Also sold as the Bearcat
United States	Auto Cub	Randall Products, Hampton, New Hampshire	Briggs & Stratton1.6 hp (1 kW)	1	1956	"looked like a horribly cheap DIY kit"
United States	Autoette	Autoette Electric Car Co, Long Beach, California	electric motor		1948-1970	Believed to be the first golf cart, the Autoette appeared in a large variety of configurations from a single seat invalid carriage to a 4-seat factory runabout, all with tiller steering and some of which were road legal. Convertible roofs were available on some models
United States	Banner Boy Buckboard	Banner Welder Inc, Milwaukee	Briggs & Stratton 2.75 hp (2 kW)		1958	Simple, open car similar to the Shawmobile and Briggs & Stratton Flyer
United States	Basson's Star	Basson's Industries Corp, Bronx, New York	ILO		1956	Prototype fiberglass 3-wheeled light delivery van, (white car in bottom photograph)
United States	Bearcat	American Buckboard Corporation, Los Angeles			1955-1956	Simple, open car, a revival of the 5-wheel Briggs & Stratton Flyer. Also sold as the American Buckboard
United States	Brogan	B and B Speciality Co, Rossmoyne, Ohio	10 hp (7 kW)	2	1946-1948	
United States	Buckaroo	Cleveland			1957	Small car with air-cooled engine, priced at $400 and capable of 18 mph
United States	Buckboard Model 60	McDonough Power Equipment Co, McDonough, Georgia		2	1960	
United States	CitiCar	Sebring Vanguard Inc, Sebring, Florida	electric motor 3.5 hp (3 kW)	2	1972-1978	From 1979, made by Commuter Vehicles Inc as the Commuta-Car
United States	Colt	Colt Motors Co, Boston	Wisconsin, 377 cc	2	1958	
United States	Comet	General Development Co, Ridgewood, Queens, New York	4.5 hp (3 kW)		1946-1948	
United States	Commuta-Car	Commuter Vehicles Inc, Sebring, Florida			1979-	See also CitiCar
United States	Commuter Cars Tango	Commuter Cars, Spokane, Washington			2005-	Zero to 60 in four seconds. First production vehicle delivered to George Clooney. Very low volume production.
United States	Sparrow	Corbin Motors Inc, Hollister, California	electric motor	1	1999-2003	
United States	Crofton	Crofton Marine Engine Co, San Diego			1959-1961	
United States	Crosley	Crosley Motors Inc, Marion, Indiana			1939-1952	
United States	Daytona	Randall Products, Hampton, New Hampshire	Briggs & Stratton 2 hp (1 kW)		1956	
United States	Delcar	American Motors Incorporated, Troy, New York	25 hp (19 kW)	1	1947-1949	Initially built as a delivery van, later one or more six seater station wagons were produced on the same chassis
United States	Diehlmobile	H.L. Diehl Co, Willington, Connecticut	Briggs & Stratton 3 hp (2 kW)	2	1962-1964	A folding three-wheeled 'spare car' that could fit in a car boot
United States	Electra-King	B & Z Electric Car Co, Long Beach, California	electric motor	2	1961-1983	Both 3- and 4-wheeled versions were available
United States	Electric Shopper	Electric Shopper, Long Beach, California	electric motor	2	1964-1983	
United States	Electro Master	Nepa Mfg Co, Pasadena, California	electric motor 2 hp (1 kW)		1962-1983	
United States	Eshelman 3 HP Adult's Sport Car	The Cheston L Eshelman Co, Baltimore	Briggs & Stratton 3 hp (2 kW)	1	1955	
United States	Eshelman 6 HP Adult's Sport Car	The Cheston L Eshelman Co, Baltimore	Briggs & Stratton 3 hp (2 kW)	2	1955-1956	
United States	Eshelman Deluxe Sportabout	Eshelman Motors Corp	Briggs & Stratton 3 hp (2 kW)	2	1957-1958	
United States	Eshelman Deluxe Sportabout Model 902 ¼ Ton Utility Truck	Eshelman Motors Corp, Baltimore	Briggs & Stratton 18 hp (13 kW)	3	1958	
United States	Eshelman Deluxe Sportabout Model 903 Passenger Car	Eshelman Motors Corp, Baltimore	Briggs & Stratton 18 hp (13 kW)	3	1958	
United States	Free-Way	H-M-Vehicles, Inc., Burnsville, Minnesota	Tecumseh 16 hp (12 kW)	1	1979 - 1982	Designed as a high efficiency single seat commuter car, they can exceed 65 mph (105 km/h) and were sold with a 100 miles per US gallon (2.4 L/100 km; 120 mpg_{‑imp}) guarantee. About 700 were made
United States	Hoppenstand	Greenville, Pennsylvania		2	1949-1950	Aluminium body, 3 variants: Roadster, Cabriolet and Coupé
United States	Hummingbird	Talmadge Judd Kingsport, Tennessee	20 hp (15 kW) water cooled 4-cyl	2	1946	
United States	Imp				1949-1951	
United States	Kapi					
United States	King Midget				1947-1970	
United States	Knudson				1948	
United States	Marketeer				1954	
United States	Marketour				1964	
United States	Markette				1967	
United States	Martin				1948-1950	
United States	Minicar				1969	
United States	Motorette				1946-1948	
United States	Multiplex				1952-1954	
United States	Nu-Klea				1959-1960	
United States	Playboy				1947-1951	
United States	Publix				1947-1948	
United States	Pup				1948-1949	
United States	Rocket				1948	
United States	Saviano				1960	
United States	Scootmobile				1946-1948	
United States	Seagrave				1960	
United States	Skorpion				1952-1954	
United States	Squire				1971-1975	
United States	Streco Turnpike Cruiser				1958-1985	
United States	Stuart				1961	
United States	Sundancer				1974	
United States	Super Kar				1946	
United States	Taylor-Dunn				1949-1966	
United States	Thrif-T				1947-1955	
United States	Towne Shopper				1948	
United States	Tri-Car				1955	
United States	Triplex Lightning				1954-1955	
United States	U.S. Mark II				1956	
United States	Westcoaster				1960	
United States	University of Michigan Urban Vehicle, SAE paper 730512		OMC Wankel 35 HP		1973	
United States	Zoe Little Giant	Zoe Motors	Honda 50 cc	1 + half ton payload	1982	
United States	Zoe Zipper	Zoe Motors	Honda 50 cc	1	1982	
USSR	GAZ 18	GAZ, Gorky	500 cc		1958	Two prototypes built as a design for a potential invalid carriage. One survives in the factory museum.
USSR	SMZ cycle-car SMZ S-3A	Serpukhov Motor Works, Serpukhov	346 cc	2	1958-1970	single-cylinder two-stroke engine
USSR	SMZ cycle-car SMZ S-3D	Serpukhov Motor Works, Serpukhov	346 cc	2	1970-1997	single-cylinder two-stroke engine
