= Meadows Frisky =

Overview
- Manufacturer: Henry Meadows Ltd
- Production: 1958-1961
- Designer: Giovanni Michelotti

Body and chassis
- Class: Microcar
- Body style: 4-wheel, 2-door Convertible; 4-wheel, 2-door Coupé; 3-wheel, 2-door saloon
- Layout: RMR

Meadows Frisky is the name of a series of small British cars manufactured at the factory of Henry Meadows Ltd at Fallings Park in Wolverhampton between 1958 and 1961, during which time production was under the control of a number of companies.

== History ==
The Frisky car project was conceived by Captain Raymond Flower, racing driver and managing director of the Cairo Motor Co Ltd., Nuffield distributors in Egypt. Flower operated the company with his two brothers, Derek and Neville, all of whom were part of the brewing dynasty of Flower & Sons of Stratford on Avon. From February 1955, under the auspices of the Cairo Motor Company, a number of projects for the manufacture of cars in Egypt under the general name of Phoenix were mooted in the press, possibly as a way of gaining favour with the government of President Nasser. However, as the relationship between Egypt and Britain deteriorated with the onset of the Suez Crisis in 1956, little of substance materialised.

As the potential for manufacture within Egypt dissipated, Raymond Flower took his idea of a small, mass produced, economical lightweight car for every-man to manufacturers in the UK, eventually reaching agreement with Henry Meadows Ltd to proceed with the project.

== Henry Meadows (Vehicles) Ltd ==
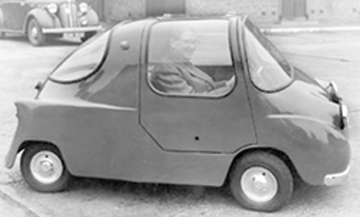
"The Bug" in 1957 with designer Gordon Bedson behind the wheel

The Meadows company was a well-established supplier of automotive, marine and industrial engines and was a part of the Associated British Engineering Company. Gordon Bedson, formerly a design engineer for Kieft Cars and the Vickers aircraft company, had joined Meadows as Export Sales Manager in 1954. Bedson, whose work at Kieft had included the design of their first sports car, and who had also designed a saloon car prototype for the Phoenix project, was called upon to bring his design experience to the Meadows car alongside Keith Peckmore, a project engineer who had also joined Meadows from Kieft.

Commencing around July 1956, in a back room at the Meadows factory, a prototype vehicle nicknamed The Bug was constructed and developed. This small, four-wheeled, two-seater had a moulded fibreglass shell with gull-wing doors and a Villiers air-cooled 250 cc (15 cu in) two-cylinder engine fitted to a brazed ladder-type chassis. To make a differential unnecessary, the car had a narrow rear track, with drive to the solid rear axle by roller chain. The car was fitted with a four-speed motorcycle manual gearbox, with reverse obtained by running the engine backwards through the Dynastart unit.

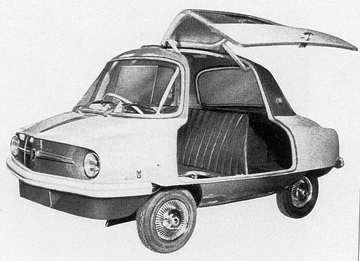
The Michelotti-designed Meadows Frisky at the 1957 Geneva Show

Whilst The Bug was under development, the Italian coachbuilding company Vignale of Turin was commissioned by Flower to design the bodywork for the production version, a task they allocated to Giovanni Michelotti. On 5 December 1956, The Bug which had been taken to Oulton Park motor racing circuit commenced a seven-day 24-hours a day test run, completing 4,000 miles (6,400 km) with a fastest lap of 54.91 miles per hour (88 km/h). Although The Bug had nothing to do with the Egyptian Phoenix project, because of the attendance of Raymond Flower at the circuit with his Phoenix SR150 sports racer and an embargo on the use of the Meadows name in connection with The Bug, Press reports of the test run erroneously referred to the Meadows project as the Phoenix minicar or Phoenix Frisky.

The disclosure of the Meadows company involvement and the correct nomenclature – Meadows Frisky – was announced by the press on 11 March 1957 just prior to the Geneva Motor Show. The press release included information about the Oulton Park test run and information about the involvement of Raymond Flower in the project and Michelotti in the design. The release also stated that the Frisky would be priced at "under £400".

Vignale delivered the body of the new car directly to the Geneva show. As this left no time to install the engine, it was displayed separately in front of the car. The design retained the gull-wing door concept from The Bug and the car attracted widespread interest and acclaim.

Two of these bodies were produced by Vignale, but it quickly became clear that the design would be too expensive for mass production and so work began on completely redesigning the car in time for the Earls Court Motor Show in October.

In June 1957, a new subsidiary of the Meadows company – Henry Meadows (Vehicles) Ltd – was registered in anticipation of production of the car.

Amongst the design changes that took place before October were the replacement of the gull-wing doors with a more conventional suicide door type and the fitting of a larger Villiers engine of 324 cc (19.8 cu in). Immediately before the show it was reported that the prototype had now covered over 100,000 miles (160,000 km) and pre-show publicity stated that there would be two cars on show, the Frisky Saloon and the Friskysport, a convertible version. Brochures displaying artist's impressions of both vehicles were printed. However, at the show, only the convertible Meadows Friskysport appeared. Once again this new design met with an enthusiastic reception from the press.

Reports from the show stated that the car was "not yet in full production". Production of the car did not commence until five months later in March 1958.

In February 1958 a controlling interest in Henry Meadows (Vehicles) Ltd. was acquired by the Flower Group of companies. Raymond Flower was appointed chairman and managing director.

== Frisky Cars Ltd ==
In September 1958, production of the Friskysport was taken over by The Marston Group of Companies; they acquired a controlling interest in Henry Meadows (Vehicles) Ltd and the name of the production company was changed to Frisky Cars Ltd.

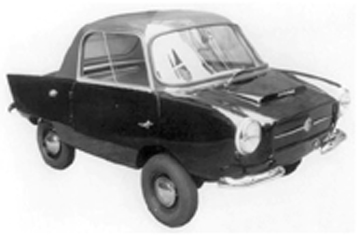
The 1958 Frisky Coupe

The Marston Group were a diverse range of interests including car dealerships, caravan manufacture, vehicle body manufacture and Regency Covers Ltd., who were at the time the largest manufacturers of car seat covers in the country.

The chairman of the newly formed Frisky Cars Ltd was Henry R Stone. Raymond, Neville, and Derek Flower were made directors. Distribution of the car was to be handled by The Arneston Motor Company Ltd. London, which belonged to Henry Stone. The franchise was also taken up by other companies of his such as The Pointer Motor Co. of Norwich.

In September 1958, it was announced that production of the Friskysport was "being supplemented by a hard-top". This car, a saloon version of the Friskysport named The Frisky Coupe, went into production in August and made its public début at the 1958 Earls Court Motor show in October. Alongside were two other new models, The Frisky Family Three and The Frisky Sprint.

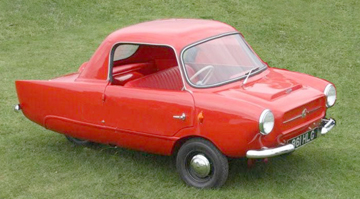
The three-wheel Family Three was classed as a motorcycle combination for tax and driving licence purposes

The production versions of the Friskysport and Frisky Coupe were very similar and used identical chassis, but there are differences to the bodywork. Early versions of the Friskysport are fitted with a separate chrome Reliant Sabre windscreen frame, and have a detachable tail section and dummy air intake scoops just behind the doors, whilst later cars have the same lower body as the Coupe. The Friskysport has overriders, whilst the Coupe has plain bumpers. The Coupe initially used the Friskysport body with an integral, glassed-on roof and steel framed front windscreen, until the Family Three one-piece body became available in 1959, which was then used for both cars.

The Frisky Family Three was basically a three-wheeled version of the coupe fitted with a smaller Villiers 9E engine and MacPherson strut front suspension. Having three wheels instead of four meant the car qualified for lower vehicle excise duty and also meant that it could be driven with a motorcycle licence. It entered production in about February 1959.

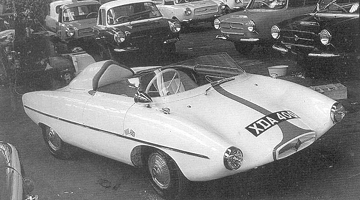
The Friskysprint inside the Meadows factory

The Friskysprint was a prototype sports racing car built at the Meadows factory and said to be capable of 90 miles per hour (145 km/h). Press reports stated that on production versions the front suspension and probably the chassis and running gear would be made at the Vickers–Armstrongs (Aircraft) factory at South Marston, Wiltshire. The prototype was finished in the American national racing colours of white with a blue stripe. It featured two bucket seats and a three-cylinder air-cooled 492 cc (30.0 cu in) Excelsior engine mounted transversely in the frame with final drive by roller chain. Unlike all other Friskys, the rear axle was full width and fitted with a differential. The car was also independently sprung using a swing axle layout. It was expected to sell for between £675 and £750 including purchase tax. The Friskysprint never reached production and Gordon Bedson, who designed and built the prototype, left to join Lightburn in Australia the following spring to produce the Zeta Sports. The Friskysprint and Zeta Sports had some similarities in styling but were otherwise unconnected and despite Lightburn advertising to the contrary, Giovanni Michelotti was not involved in the design of either car.

In June 1959, Frisky Cars Ltd experienced financial difficulties, and an order was made by Hills Fibre Glass Developments, who produced the bodies for the Frisky, for a debt of £3,500. Despite being in poor health at the time, Henry Stone vigorously defended the order and with the support of his employees and all the other creditors put forward an alternative plan. Because of the insistence of the creditor, the judge, Mr Justice Valsey, had no alternative but to grant the order saying that "he did so with some regret". All production ceased and the company was wound up.

== Frisky Cars (1959) Ltd ==
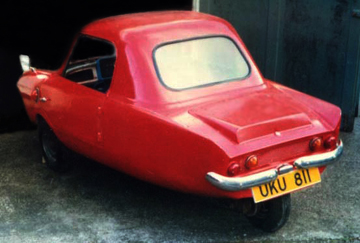
The rear of a Mk 2 Family Three showing the additional hatch over the engine, unique to this model

In August 1959, Mr C. J. Wright, a Wolverhampton business man with garage and haulage interests, bought the stock, jigs, tools, fixtures and fittings, along with the rights to manufacture and the trade name of Frisky from the Official Receiver. He formed a new company, Frisky Cars (1959) Ltd. and he and E F Wright became directors. A Mr G A Stuart was made General Manager. The company announced that they hoped to restart production in September at Fallings Park, Wolverhampton, with a target of 30 three-wheeled cars a week; also that a deluxe version would follow and that it was hoped that the Friskysprint would be built later. Also announced was the intention to build a new production plant on a 30-acre (120,000 m^{2}) site in Penkridge, Staffordshire, but this never happened.

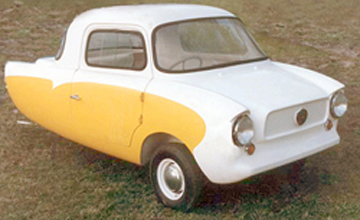
A 1961 Frisky Prince

In September 1959, a new version of the Family Three was announced. The Frisky Family Three Mk2 dropped the MacPherson strut front suspension of the original car, replacing it with the Dubonnet system used on the Friskysport. The chassis was lengthened to allow the engine to be moved back out of the cabin and it was now offered with the choice of either a 250 cc (15 cu in) or 328 cc (20.0 cu in) Excelsior Talisman twin engines having the advantage of an Albion gearbox with a true reverse gear. Twin front seats replaced the original bench seats and production commenced in early 1960.

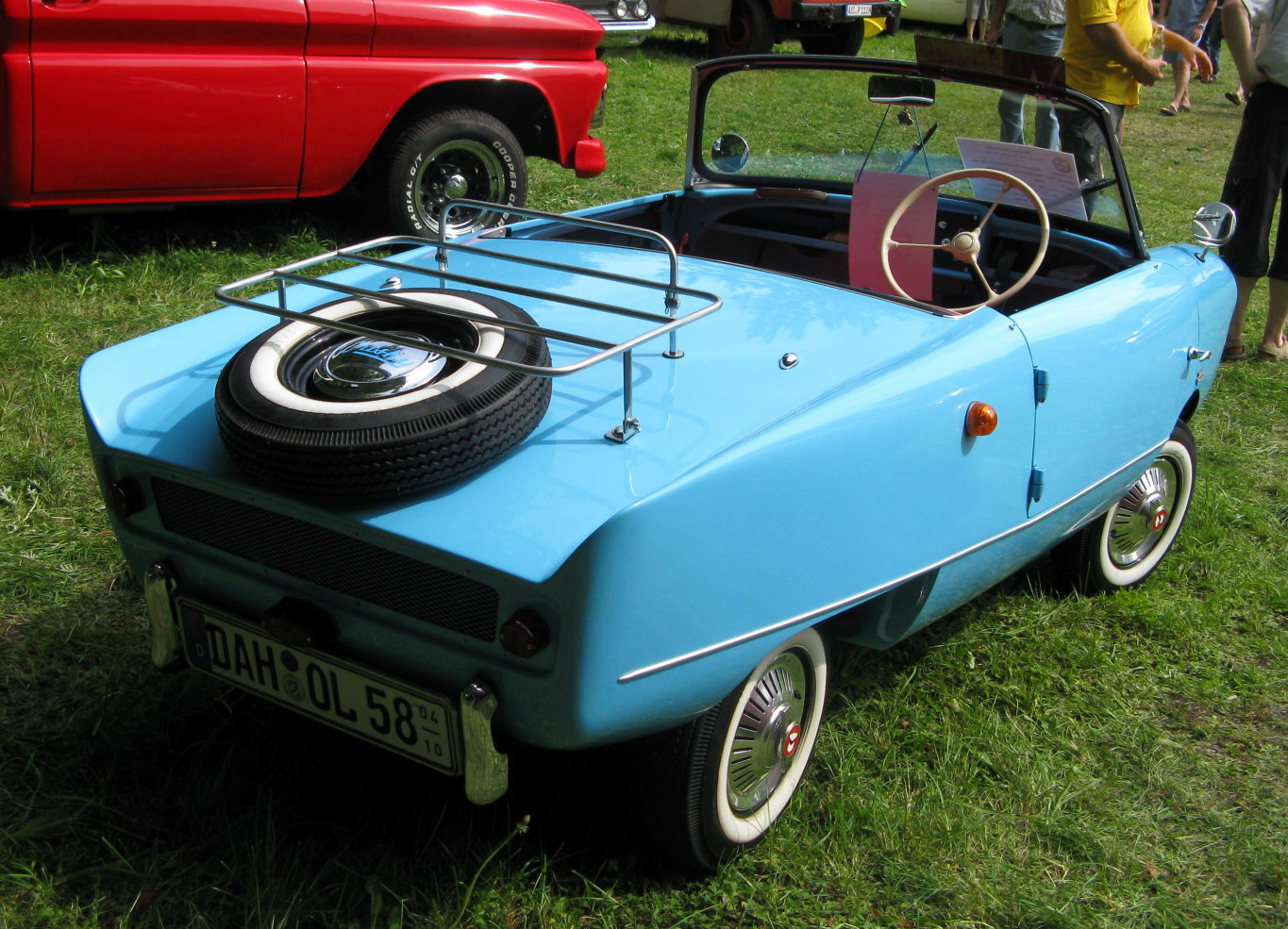
This 1958 Friskysport shows the regular flat tail without hatch

In October 1960, a new model, The Frisky Prince, was shown at the Earls Court Motor Show. This was basically a re-bodied Family Three with front hung doors. Around the same time, a deal was done with a company called Middlesbrough Motorcraft and kits and 'build your own Frisky' became available from them. Anthony Brindle, who had become joint managing director of Frisky Cars, took part in a publicity run, attempting to visit five European capitals, Paris, Luxembourg, Brussels, Amsterdam and London while not spending more than £5 on fuel.

A four-wheel version of the Prince was announced for 1961, but never reached production.

== Frisky Cars (1959) Ltd, Sandwich, Kent ==
In February 1961, the company was purchased by Mr R Bird, the chairman of Petbow Ltd. of Sandwich, Kent. Petbow were one of the world's largest manufacturers of engine-driven power plants, including welding and generating equipment. All Frisky production and stocks were moved from the Meadows factory and a production line within Petbow's existing factory was set up.

The Frisky Prince, with strong competition from the BMC Mini, was not proving popular and chassis problems meant increasing time was spent rectifying customers' cars rather than producing new ones. Despite valiant efforts by staff and management, all work ceased towards the end of 1961, bringing to an end the production of the Frisky car.

== Frisky Spares and Service Ltd, Queenborough, Kent ==
In 1962, a group of Petbow employees set up Frisky Spares and Service Ltd in Queenborough, Kent and all remaining stocks of Frisky parts were moved there from Petbow's works. This company mainly supplied spares for existing car owners. No real production took place, although they would assemble a car for a customer if required, but preferred to provide a kit, so that customers could construct their own. They ceased trading around 1966.

== Specifications ==
Vehicle name:	Friskysport	Frisky Coupe	Frisky Family Three	Frisky Family Three Mk2	Frisky Prince
No of wheels:	4		3		
Engine:	Villiers 3T twin-cylinder two-stroke engine		Villiers 9E single-cylinder two-stroke engine	Excelsior TT or TT1 twin-cylinder two-stroke engine ^{[a]}	
layout:	Rear mid-engine, rear-wheel drive layout				
Capacity:	324 cc (20 cu in)		197 cc (12 cu in)	TT1 328 cc (20 cu in), TT 250 cc (15 cu in)	
Bore × Stroke:	57 × 63.5 mm		59 × 72 mm	TT1 58 × 62 mm, TT 50 × 62 mm	
Output:	16 bhp (12 kW; 16 PS)		9.5 bhp (7 kW; 10 PS)	TT1 18 bhp (13 kW; 18 PS), TT 10.75 bhp (8 kW; 11 PS)	
Engine cooling:	Air-cooled by ducted fan				
Transmission:	manual 4-speed			manual 4-speed with reverse	
Front suspension:	leading arm, dubonnet-type rubber in torsion		MacPherson strut	leading arm, dubonnet-type rubber in torsion	
Rear Suspension:	Shock absorber				
Body::	fibreglass body, bolted to tubular frame				
Track width front/rear:	48.25 in (1,226 mm) / 32 in (810 mm)		48.5 in (1,230 mm) / n/a	48.5 in (1,230 mm) / n/a	48.5 in (1,230 mm) / n/a
Wheelbase:	5 ft 0 in (1.52 m)		5 ft 7 in (1.70 m)	6 ft 0 in (1.83 m)	
Tyre size:	4.40–10in				
Dimension L × W x H:	112.5 in (2.86 m) × 55.5 in (1.41 m) × 49 in (1.2 m)		109.5 in (2.78 m) × 55.5 in (1.41 m) × 48 in (1.2 m)		122 in (3.1 m) × 55 in (1.4 m) × 55 in (1.4 m)
Kerb weight (without driver):	6.25 long cwt (318 kg)	7 long cwt (360 kg)	6.5 long cwt (330 kg)	6.25 long cwt (318 kg)	
Fuel tank capacity:	3.5 imp gal (16 L)				
Top speed:	65 mph (105 km/h)	56 mph (90 km/h)	50 mph (80 km/h)	TT1 65 mph (105 km/h), TT 50 mph (80 km/h)	
Price new:	£484 17s (1958)	£449 17s (1958)	£378 (1960)	£391 16s 8d (1961)	£397 (1961)
Model years:	1958–1961	1958–1961	1959-1959	1960–1961	1960–1961

- Above specifications courtesy of The Frisky Register.

a. The 324 cc Villiers 3T engine was also available as an option in these two cars.

== The Frisky Register ==
The Frisky Register was set up in 1978 by John Meadows, grandson of Henry Meadows, offering assistance and advice to owners to encourage the preservation and restoration of these unique cars.

== See also ==
- List of microcars by country of origin
