= Russon =

Russon Minicar

Overview
- Manufacturer: Russon Cars Ltd
- Production: 1951-1952

Body and chassis
- Class: microcar
- Body style: 2-door coupé

Powertrain
- Engine: 250 cc Excelsior
- Transmission: 3-speed manual

The Russon was a British microcar with a sporting appearance and built by Russon Cars Ltd in Eaton Bray, Stanbridge, Bedfordshire, between 1951 and 1952.

Brain-child of D.A. Russell, the editor of Aeromodeller magazine, and designed by Derek Currie, the Russon was at first powered by a rear-mounted 197-cc JAP engine, but production cars used a larger 250-cc twin from Excelsior. Drive was to the rear wheels through a motorcycle-type 3-speed gearbox. The suspension was independent all around with coil springs, and the body was mounted on a tubular chassis frame. 50 mph (80 km/h) and 65 mpg were claimed.

The alloy-panelled body was built on an ash frame in a traditional coachbuilders manner and was styled to look like a bit like a miniature Jaguar XK120. There was said to be room for three people to sit side by side. The car was killed by its high price of £491, for which a "normal" family saloon could be had, and less than 10 were made.

The assets of this company were acquired by Air Vice Marshal D.C.T. Bennett in preparation for his project, the Fairthorpe Cars.

== See also ==
- List of car manufacturers of the United Kingdom
