= Powerdrive =

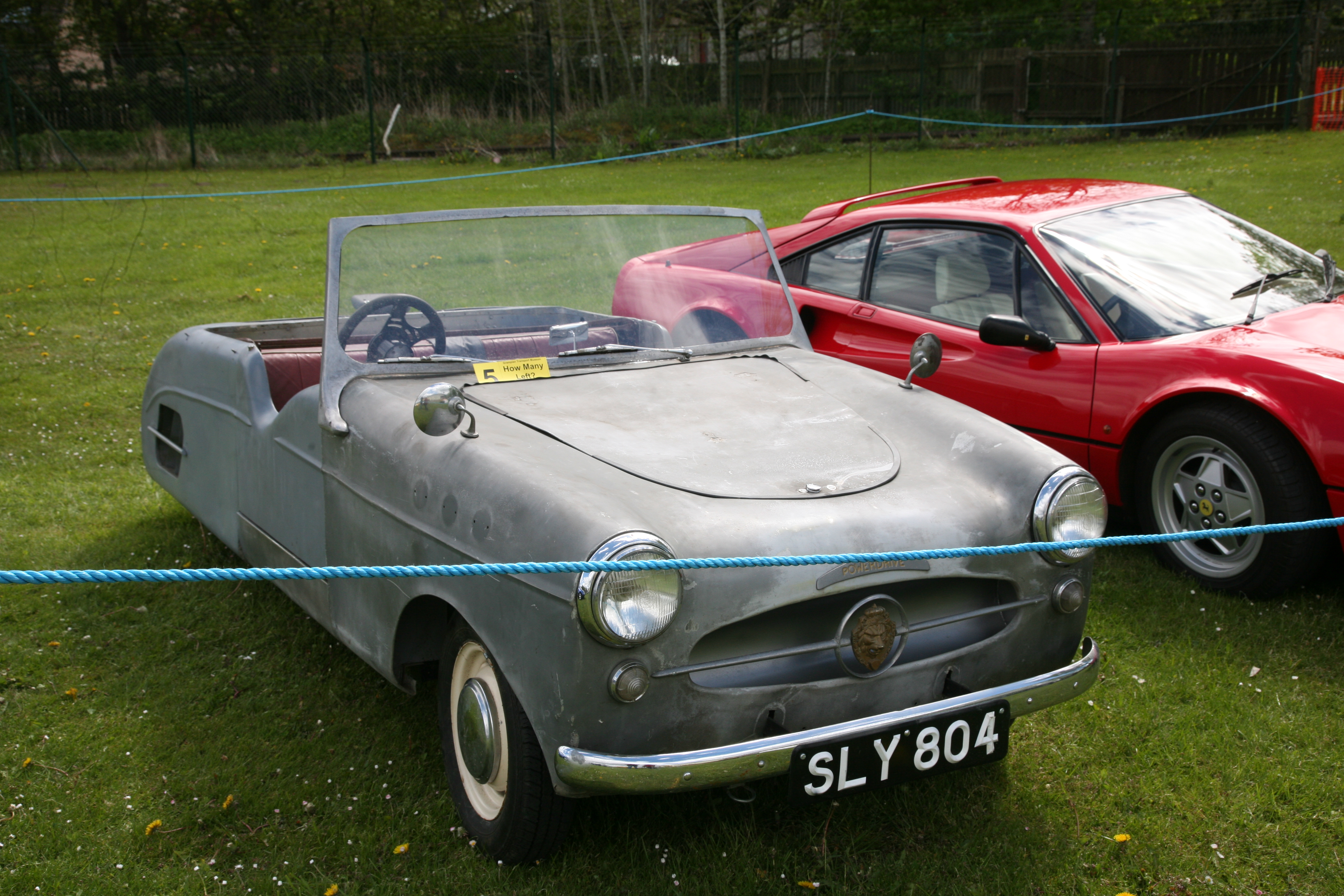
- Powerdrive microcar

Overview
- Manufacturer: Powerdrive Ltd
- Model years: November 1955 - February 1957
- Assembly: Wood Green, London
- Designer: David Gottlieb

Body and chassis
- Class: microcar
- Body style: 2-door convertible
- Layout: RMR
- Related: Coronet (automobile)

Powertrain
- Engine: Anzani 322 cc (20 cu in) twin-cylinder Two-stroke engine.
- Transmission: 3-speed and reverse manual

Dimensions
- Wheelbase: 8 ft 8 in (2.64 m)
- Length: 12 ft 0 in (3.66 m)
- Width: 4 ft 8.5 in (1.435 m)
- Kerb weight: 8 long cwt (410 kg)

The Powerdrive was a three-wheeled microcar with a rear-mounted 322 cc (20 cu in) Anzani two cylinder, two stroke 16.5 metric horsepower (12 kW) engine.

The car was designed by David Gottlieb, whose Powerdrive company had previously worked with the Allard Motor Company on the development of the abortive Allard Clipper. Like the Clipper, the Powerdrive was devised to exploit the lower tax rate then applicable in the UK to three wheeled vehicles weighing less than 8 long cwt (410 kg). Physically, the Powerdrive was larger than other cars in this class, with full-size 13-inch wheels and a large amount of luggage space at both the front and rear. The car's design and styling attracted much praise at its launch at the Dorchester Hotel in London in July 1955.
