= Coronet (automobile) =

Overview
- Manufacturer: Coronet Cars Ltd
- Model years: June 1957 - October 1958
- Assembly: West Drayton, Middlesex

Body and chassis
- Class: microcar
- Body style: 2-door convertible
- Layout: RR layout

Powertrain
- Engine: Excelsior TT 328 cc (20 cu in) twin-cylinder Two-stroke engine.
- Transmission: 3-speed and reverse manual

The Coronet was a three-wheeled microcar with a rear-mounted 328 cc (20 cu in) Excelsior two-cylinder, two-stroke 18 metric horsepower (13 kW) engine.
