= Astra (1954 automobile) =

Overview
- Manufacturer: Astra Car Company
- Production: 1954–59

Body and chassis
- Class: Microcar
- Body style: 2-door saloon or estate

Powertrain
- Engine: 322 cc (19.6 cu in) Anzani two-cylinder
- Transmission: 3-speed manual

Dimensions
- Wheelbase: 74 in (1,880 mm)
- Length: 114 in (2,896 mm)
- Width: 53 in (1,346 mm)

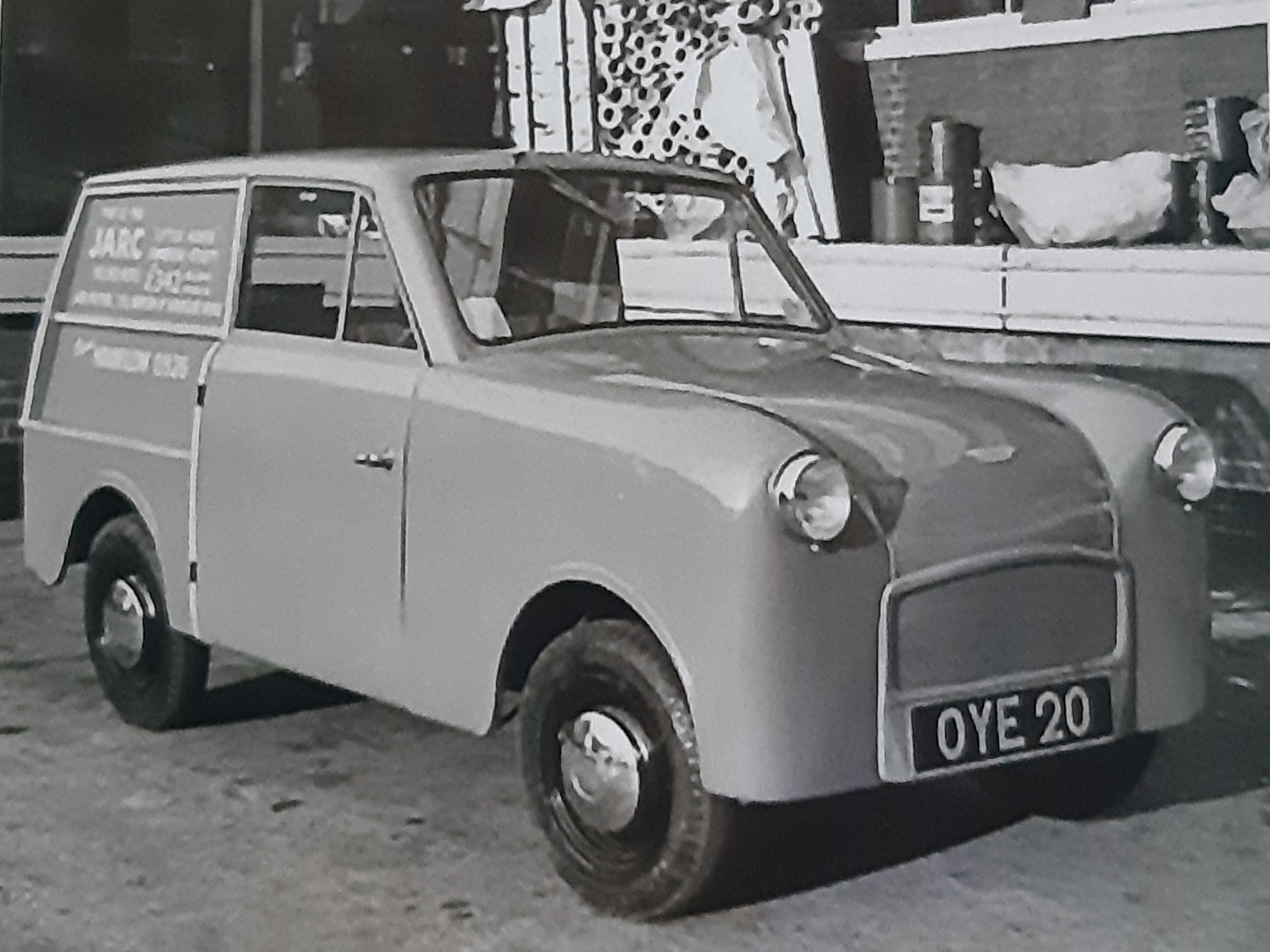
JARC Delivery Van a 1960 model

The Astra, Little Horse, was an English car built by a subsidiary of British Anzani of Hampton Hill, Middlesex from 1954 until 1959. At GBP348 it claimed to be the smallest and cheapest four-wheeler on the British market. The car had originally been built by JARC motors and sold as the Little Horse.

== Car ==
It featured a rear-mounted 322 cc (19.6 cu in) air-cooled, twin-cylinder engine mounted under the floor driving the rear wheels through a three-speed motorcycle-type gearbox. The steel channel section chassis had all-round independent suspension with swing axles at the rear. Most cars had two seater estate car bodies, but some four-seat saloons were also made. The bodies were made of aluminium. The car could also be bought in kit form. It was claimed to be able to reach 55 mph (89 km/h) and return 60 mpg_{‑imp} (4.7 L/100 km; 50 mpg_{‑US}).

After production ceased, some coupés were made by Gill cars and sold as the Getabout. The rights were also bought by Harold Lightburn of Camden, Adelaide, Australia who fitted a new glass-fibre estate body and sold the car as the Zeta between 1963 and 1966.

== See also ==
- List of car manufacturers of the United Kingdom
