= Zeta (automobile) =

Australian automobile

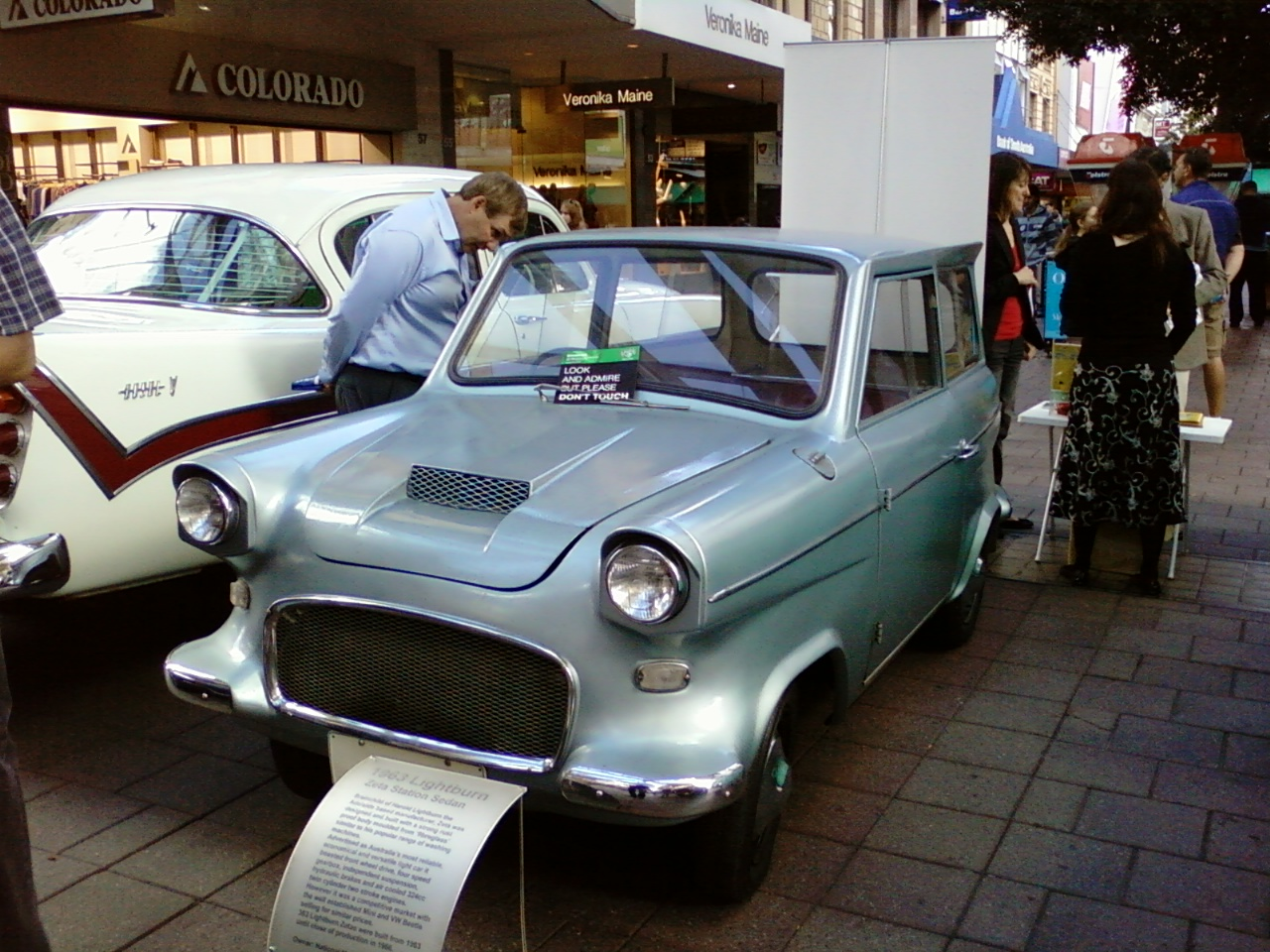
1983 Lightburn Zeta station sedan

Zeta is a marque of automobile which was produced in Australia from 1963 to 1965 by South Australian manufacturing company Lightburn & Co.

An established manufacturer of cement mixers and washing machines, Lightburn and Co. built the cars in its factory in the Adelaide suburb of Camden Park. The first Zeta model was introduced in 1963 at a price of £595. Production ceased in 1965 with the last vehicles sold in 1966 and total sales of fewer than 400 vehicles.

== Models ==
Zeta cars were produced in the following models:

- Zeta Sedan, a 2-door sedan
- Zeta Sedan Deluxe, a 2-door sedan
- Zeta Utility, a 2-door coupé utility
- Zeta Sports, a roadster

The Zeta Sedan, Sedan Deluxe and Utility were equipped with a Villiers Engineering 324cc producing 12 kW (16.5 hp) and 4 speed manual. The Zeta Sports equipped with a ZF Sachs 493cc producing 15.5 kW (21 hp) and 4 speed manual. The Sedan was also called the Zeta Runabout.

Lightburn also produced an electric 'mobility-scooter esque' runabout vehicle capable of carrying 2 adults and available in two models.

== Features ==
=== Sedan and Utility ===
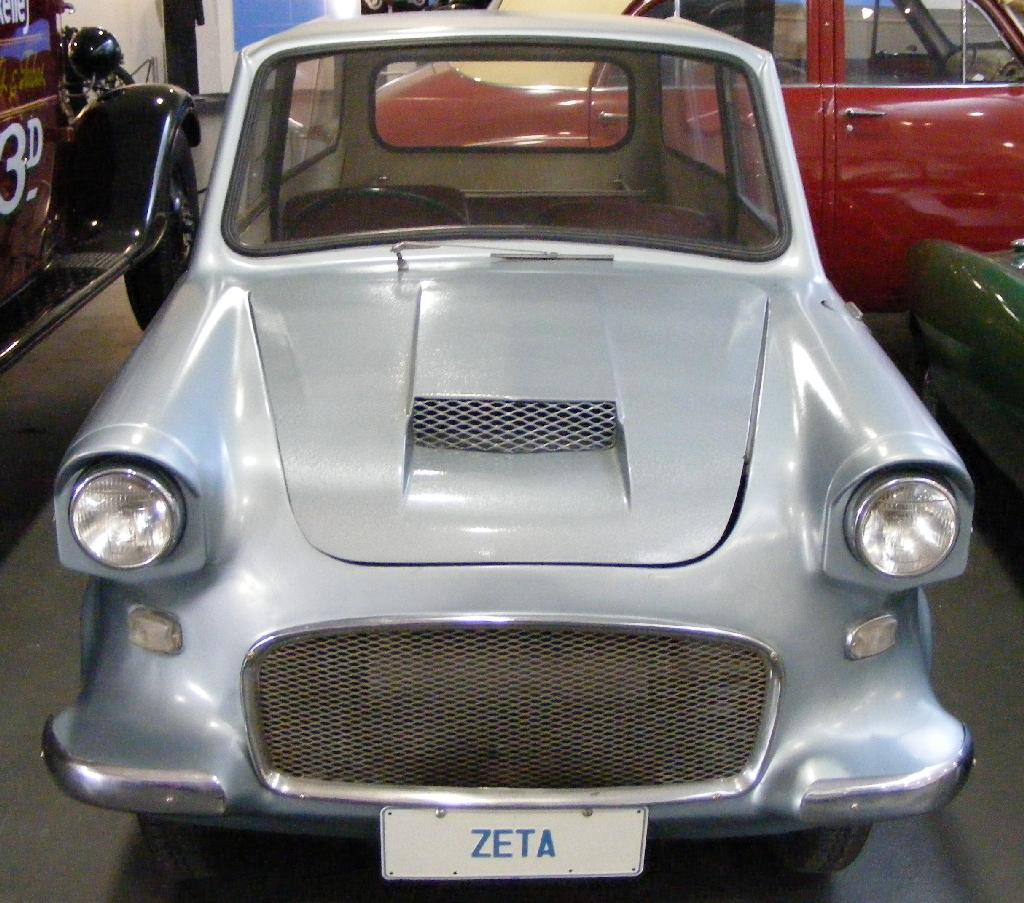
Zeta Sedan

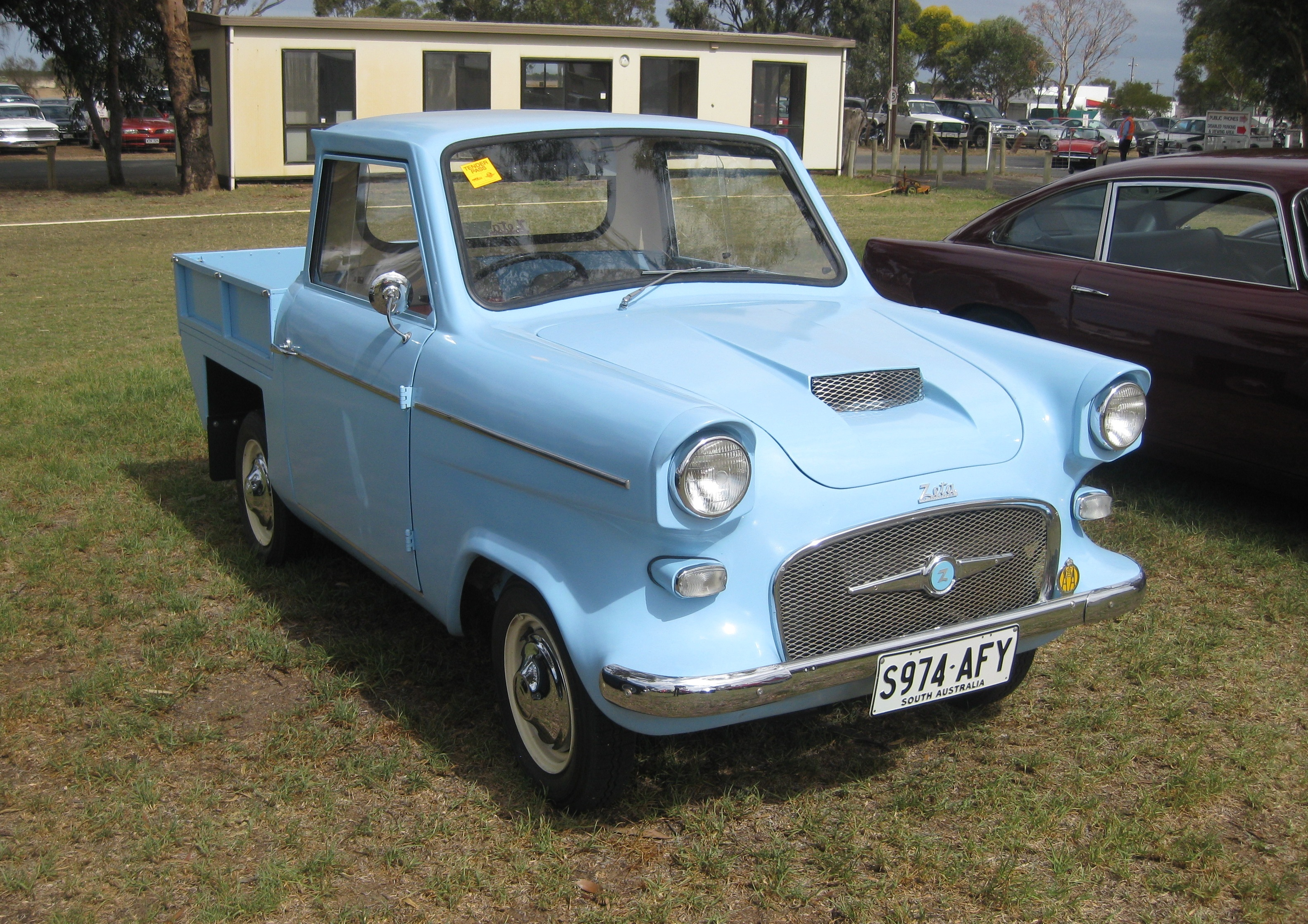
Zeta Utility

The Zeta Sedan, (also known as the Zeta Runabout) and Utility, were powered by a 324cc Villiers engine producing 12 kW (16.5 hp) and were front wheel drive with independent rear trailing arms. It had a four speed dog clutch manual gearbox by Villiers Engineering, which had no reverse gear so the engine had to be switched off and started backwards, providing four reverse gears. Fuel was delivered by gravity feed from a tank behind the dashboard. The fuel gauge was a plastic pipe running from the top to the bottom of the tank with a graduated glass tube section on the dashboard.

The Sedan was not equipped with a rear hatch so access to the cargo area required removal of the front seats, the ease of which was advertised as a positive feature. The chassis was steel, with a fibreglass body enclosing a large but sparse interior. Windows were perspex except for the front windscreen which was laminated glass.

The Utility had a total of 8 units produced. A number were purchased by Sydney City Council's Hyde Park fleet. The Utility was mechanically identical to the Sedan.

=== Sports ===
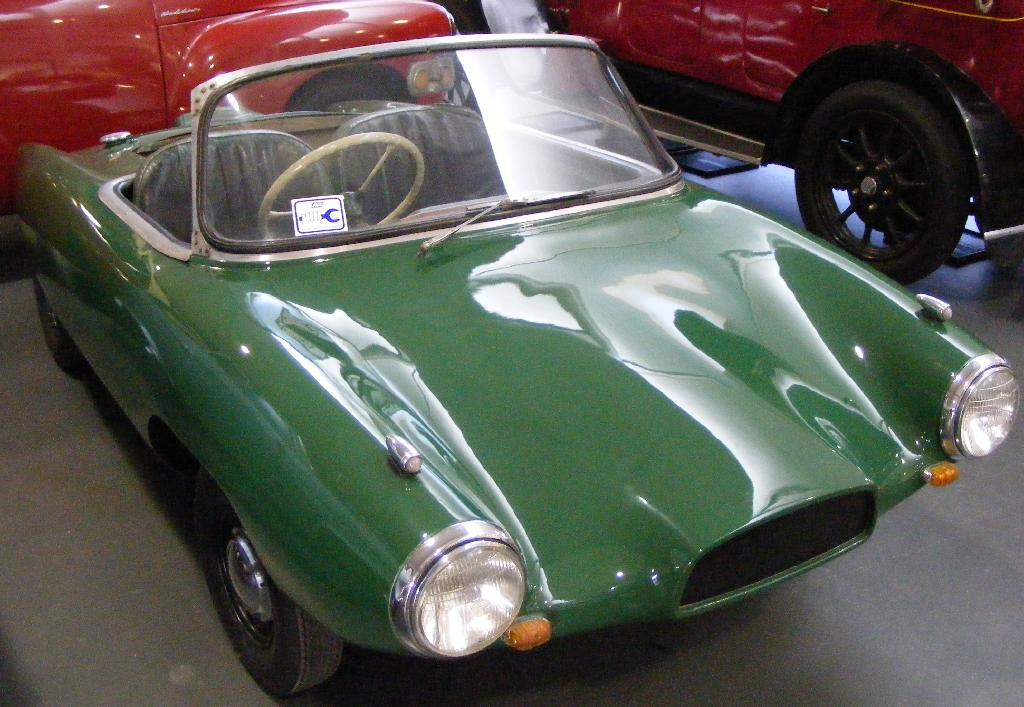
Zeta Sports

The two-seater Zeta Sports was introduced in 1964. Body styling was based on the Henry Meadows Sprint version of the Frisky microcar, designed by Gordon Bedson and Keith Peckmore, although Lightburn attributed the design to Michelotti. The fibreglass bodied car weighed 400 kilograms (882 lb) and ran on 10-inch wheels with all-round drum brakes. Like the Goggomobil Dart it lacked doors and bumper bars. The Zeta Sports was fitted with a West German ZF Sachs F.M.R. 500 498cc two cylinder, two-stroke engine producing 15.5 kilowatts (21 hp). The engine, which had a 70mm bore and a 67mm stroke was originally designed for and used in the 4 wheel FMR Tg500 microcar. The Zeta Sports was fitted with a 4 speed and reverse sequential gearbox in unit with the engine. 48 examples were produced.

== Sales history ==
With the Zeta, however, failure was engineered into the product from day one.

— Tony Davis, Extra Lemon!

As well as the oddness of the design, the vehicle's commercial success was also stymied by unfortunate timing as it was released onto the market at the same time as the Morris Mini, which was only £60 more expensive. As a result, only 363 vehicles were sold from 1963 to 1966, including 28 of the Sports model. According to a sign in the National Motor Museum in Birdwood, South Australia, 48 of the sports model were manufactured.
