= Zoe Motors =

Defunct American motor vehicle manufacturer

Zoe Motors, Inc.
- Company type: Subsidiary
- Industry: Automotive
- Products: Zoe Zipper
- Parent: Zoe Products Inc.

Zoe Motors, Inc., a subsidiary of Zoe Products Inc., was an early-1980s automotive company based in California and best known for its Zoe Zipper three-wheeled microcar. Zoe was publicly traded on the NASDAQ as ZOEP and later ZOEP.PK, although the company is no longer active today. In addition to the Zipper, Zoe's products included the Little Giant truck and the Zoe Runner.

Zoe should be pronounced to rhyme with Maui rather than with doe or joey.

== Zoe Zipper ==
Zoe Motors' best-known product was its Zoe Zipper vehicle, a very small three-wheeled single-seat car (or "microcar") based on a 50 cc Honda motorcycle engine. It was manufactured by Mitsuoka Motors of Japan, introduced there in 1982 and made its American debut the following year in 1983, where Zoe had distribution and branding rights to the vehicle. In the US, the Zipper could be considered a motorcycle for registration and insurance purposes, making it somewhat simpler to own than a full-sized car. The Zipper was sold in both a convertible and a hardtop model.

The Zipper had angular styling inspired by Giorgetto Giugiaro's "folded paper" automotive designs seen on other early-1980s cars such as the DeLorean and the Lotus Esprit. In terms of performance, the Zipper had 5 hp (4 kW) of power and reached speeds of 45 mph (72 km/h), with considerable fuel economy of 112 miles per gallon. It ran on regular gasoline.

Perhaps the single best remembered part of the Zipper outside auto-enthusiast circles was its appearance as a prize on the TV game show The Price Is Right. Neither host Bob Barker nor announcer Johnny Olson could keep from giggling when the incredulous contestant asked "What is that?" and later "It's a car?!" She did win it. According to the show, the Zipper (the hardtop model) cost $3785.

The Zipper was not successful in the United States. Numerous factors contributed to its lack of success. The name and design were perceived as too "cutesy" by the general public. Also problematic was the one-seat design common to microcars, which severely limited its usefulness as a general-purpose vehicle: even most motorcycles are able to accept a second person as a passenger. The price, while certainly low for a car, was not so extremely low that consumers were willing to give up the convenience of a second seat. A four-seat Yugo, for example, boasted a $3990 price in the mid-80s, just slightly more than the Zipper. Mitsuoka does still manufacture microcars in Japan, currently with four wheels and very different styling.

== Little Giant ==
Built upon the same 50 cc Honda motorcycle engine as the Zipper but otherwise not resembling it at all, the Zoe Little Giant was a truck, advertised as a "all purpose mini-utility truck" and similar to the baggage carts seen at airports but smaller. According to Zoe sales literature, it had a payload of half a ton. With an open doorless cab, it was unsuitable for street driving. It sold for about $6000 and was released at roughly the same time as the Zipper.

== Company information ==
At the time of the Zoe Zipper launch, Zoe was headed by president and chairman James MacPherson. Dan Levitan, formerly of Dollar Rent-a-Car, was executive vice president. Public relations were handled by the Joseph Molina company, which specialises in the automotive and motorsports with clients such as Rolls-Royce and Lamborghini.

== Zoe Z/5000 ==
Another attempt to import a car into the USA with little modifications, the Zoe was originally called the Z/3000, then the Z/5000 with the Z/5005 becoming a 'panel van' version.

The car was actually the 3 wheeled UK built Reliant Rialto estate, originally Zoe wanted to import the vehicle with very little changes apart from cosmetic items such as window tints, wheels and body decals but after little interest from the public they decided to engineer the car as they put it to 'american tastes'.

In the end 5 prototypes were built, these vehicles had the axle extended 6 to 8 inches each side with wide body wheel arches fitted, gemini 10" alloy wheels, a cream/chestnut interior with matching vinyl bucket seats, other extras not seen on the UK Rialto was also features such as air conditioning, the design consultant for the car was Larry Shinoda, famous for working on the Corvette.

These new widebody vehicles were now called the 'sportswagon' and pitched to the public as a range topping sports car with the standard bodied vehicles been the cheaper model with a asking price $5,595 dollars

In 1985 Zoe Inc did a huge media push to get interest in the car using Dennis James to advertise it on the media posters, the marketing compared the zoe models to the original VW beetle in cheap motoring and pushed the fact the car could achieve 75mpg. The cars were also featured as a prize on The Price Is Right, and were originally going to feature in CBS's limited-run 8 part series Otherworld, but the cars were not supplied.

Zoe never intended to sell the cars but to show this vehicle and import process was viable, after all this marketing no one came forward to buy the idea and Zoe Inc closed the project down, the 7 Reliant Rialto models that were imported were all sold off, 2 survivors still exist in the states with the famous Red 'sportswagon' model ending up in germany as of 2017.

== Bibliography ==
- Rees, Chris – Three-Wheelers, From Morgan to Messerschmitt, Benz to Bond and Beyond
