= Gill (automobile) =

Gill Getabout

Overview
- Manufacturer: Gill Cars Ltd
- Production: 1958-1960

Body and chassis
- Class: Microcar
- Body style: 2-door coupé

Powertrain
- Engine: 322 cc Anzani two-cylinder
- Transmission: 3-speed manual

Dimensions
- Length: 114 inches (2895 mm)

The Gill was an English car based on the Astra and built in George Street, Paddington, London from 1958 to 1960 by a subsidiary of the British Anzani Company. It was another product of the fuel shortages that occurred during the 1956 Suez Crisis.

Like the Astra it featured a rear-mounted 322 cc air-cooled engine mounted under the floor at the rear and all-round independent suspension with swing axles at the rear. Drive was by chain to the rear wheels through a three-speed motorcycle gearbox with floor-mounted change lever. The brakes were hydraulically operated.

The two seat body was made from aluminium over a wood frame mounted on a steel chassis. It shared the Astra's front bodywork but from the windscreen back it was bodied as a coupé called the Getabout. A four-seat taxi version was also proposed and some saloons might have been made. At £500 (£523 for the de-luxe) the car was expensive when a Ford Popular cost £444.

== See also ==
- List of car manufacturers of the United Kingdom
