= American Motors Incorporated =

Defunct American motor vehicle manufacturer

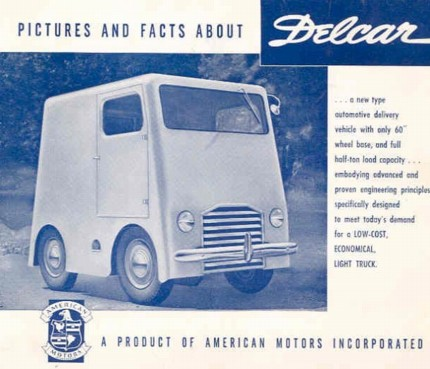
Delcar brochure page 1

American Motors Incorporated (AMI) designed, manufactured, and sold a minivan for commercial delivery use in the late 1940s.

== History ==
American Motors Incorporated was established around 1946. It was very short-lived; it does not seem to have been in operation after 1949. It had executive offices on Park Avenue in New York City, and a factory and service facility located upstate in Troy, New York.

=== Lack of success ===
Small delivery vehicles such as the Delcar did not succeed. Purchasers were limited by their carrying capacity. A larger truck can haul more cargo, resulting in less cost per mile traveled. Few niche market customers demand such a specialized service vehicle.

== Products ==
The company manufactured a minivan designed for business delivery uses called the Delcar. The wheelbase was only 60 in (1,500 mm) with a 25 hp (18.6 kW) engine, and it was priced at US$890. The Delcar was the first American vehicle with independent suspension on all four wheels, though the suspension used airplane landing gear-like rubber tension cords.

One or more station wagons were produced using the same chassis, as well as the Delcar van. The station wagon could seat six passengers.
