= Airscoot =

Defunct American motor vehicle manufacturer

Aircraft Products
- Type: Automobile Manufacturing
- Industry: Automotive
- Founded: 1947
- Defunct: 1947
- Headquarters: Wichita, Kansas, United States
- Area served: United States
- Products: Vehicles

The Airscoot was a conceptualized three-wheel, two-passenger vehicle made from lightweight tubing, and powered by a 2.6bhp single-cylinder engine. Designed by Witchita-based company Aircraft Products in 1947 to be folded up and stored in a private aircraft, the vehicle weighed only 72 pounds and was 60 inches overall. Unfolded, it had a promised speed of 25 miles per hour, and a projected economy of 60 mpg_{‑US} (3.9 L/100 km; 72 mpg_{‑imp}), with passenger and stowage accommodations including seats for two passengers and a luggage rack in front for two suitcases.The Airscoot never made it into production.
