= Associated British Engineering =

- Traded as: LSE: ASBE
- Headquarters: United Kingdom
- Products: Engineering
- Website: www.abeplc.co.uk

Associated British Engineering plc is a United Kingdom-based engineering company. The company is listed on the FTSE Fledgling Index of the London Stock Exchange under the ticker ASBE in the industrial engineering sector.
