= Allard Clipper =

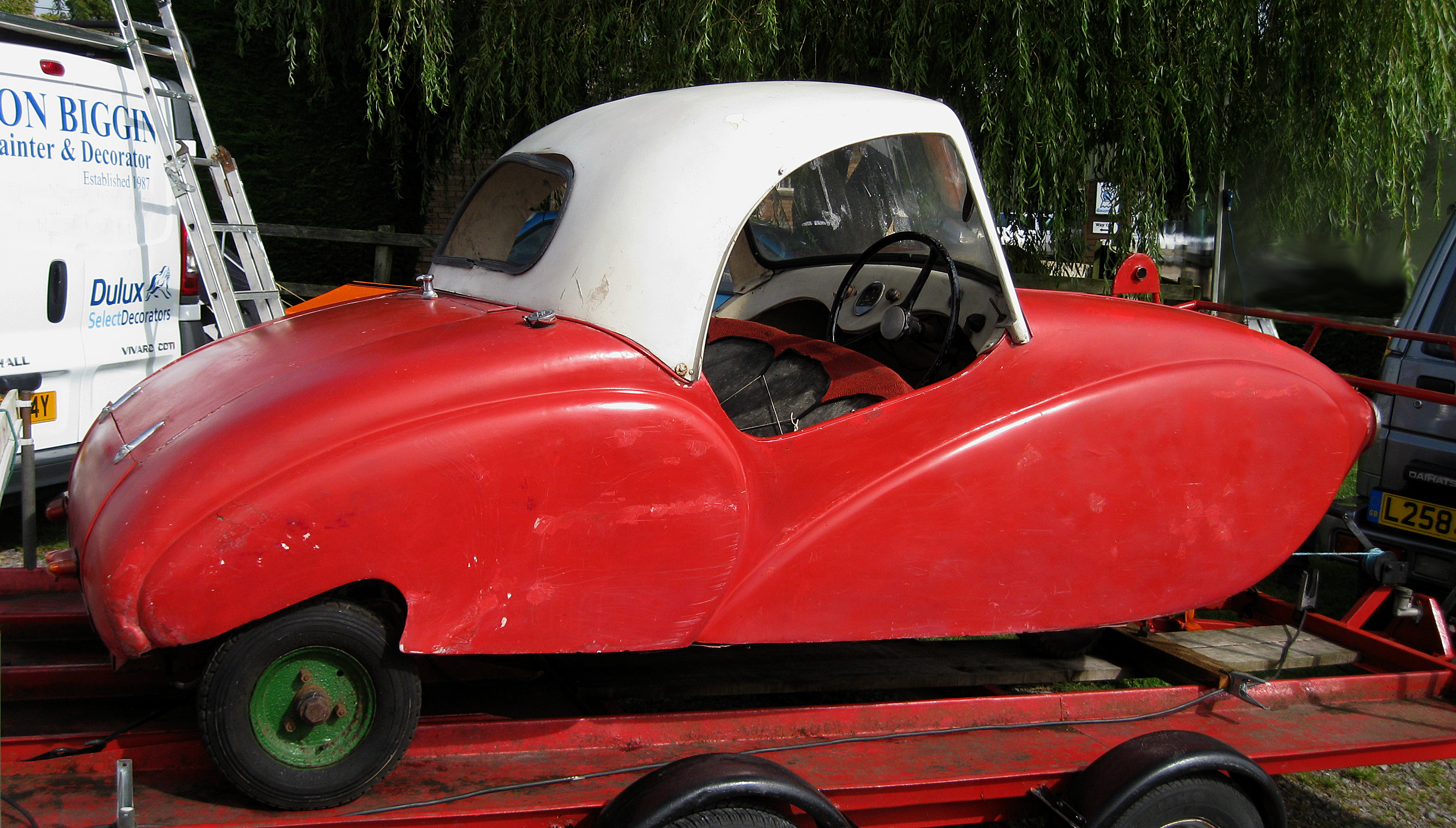

Overview
- Manufacturer: Allard
- Production: 1953–54
- Assembly: Fulham, SW London
- Designer: David Gottlieb

Body and chassis
- Class: Microcar
- Body style: 1-door 3-wheel saloon

Powertrain
- Engine: 8 bhp Villiers two-stroke 346 cc

Allard, better known for light sports cars, produced a pilot run of around twenty fibreglass-bodied three-wheeled Clipper microcars in 1953–54. The rear-mounted Villiers 24B 346 cc (21.1 cu in) single-cylinder two-stroke motorcycle engine is connected by triple 'V' belt drive to a Burman gearbox which drives the rear left wheel via chain. Suspension is trailing arm using an Andre Neihart rubber mounting design.

The car was designed by David Gottlieb of Power Drive Ltd and advertised as having an "indestructible" plastic body, made by Hordern-Richmond Ltd; the Clipper was the first car to have a colour-impregnated fibreglass body. It seats three adults on a bench seat and two children in optional dickey seats revealed when the rear boot is opened. Access to the bench seat is via a single door on the nearside, with the driver having to slide across to reach his place. The Clipper's lightweight body and small engine contributed to its weight of just 6 long cwt (300 kg), with a claimed fuel consumption of 70 mpg_{‑imp} (4.0 L/100 km; 58 mpg_{‑US}). It was priced at £268 (equivalent to £9300 in 2023 (Note: UK Retail Price Index inflation figures are based on data from Clark, Gregory (2017), "The Annual RPI and Average Earnings for Britain, 1209 to Present (New Series)", MeasuringWorth)), although it never reached the production stage.

== Project cancellation ==
The Clipper was intended to be sold in volume through motorcycle dealerships, to compete with the Bond Minicar. After testing a prototype against two other UK three wheelers, a Bond and an AC Petite, an agreement was made with Encon Motors to manufacture the Clipper at their workshop in Fulham. Production problems with the fibreglass body required new moulds to be made, which incurred additional costs which could not be agreed, and the project was cancelled in 1954. Cooling difficulties and driveshaft weakness made the Clipper very unreliable, to the extent that motoring writer Giles Chapman rated the car at No. 1 in his list of the top ten most unreliable cars in The Worst Cars Ever Sold. As of 2001 there were three survivors, only one of which was in relatively good condition.

== See also ==
- List of microcars by country of origin
