= Fairthorpe Cars =

British automobile manufacturer

Fairthorpe Ltd was a British manufacturer of motorcars, active between 1954 and 1973. Production was in Chalfont St Peter, Buckinghamshire, England between 1954 and 1961, from 1961 to 1973 in Denham, Buckinghamshire.

Fairthorpe Ltd was founded by Air Vice Marshal Donald Bennett.

Fairthorpe Ltd remains listed (as does Technical Exponents Ltd) at Denham Green Lane (as at 2007), but Fairthorpe does not trade.

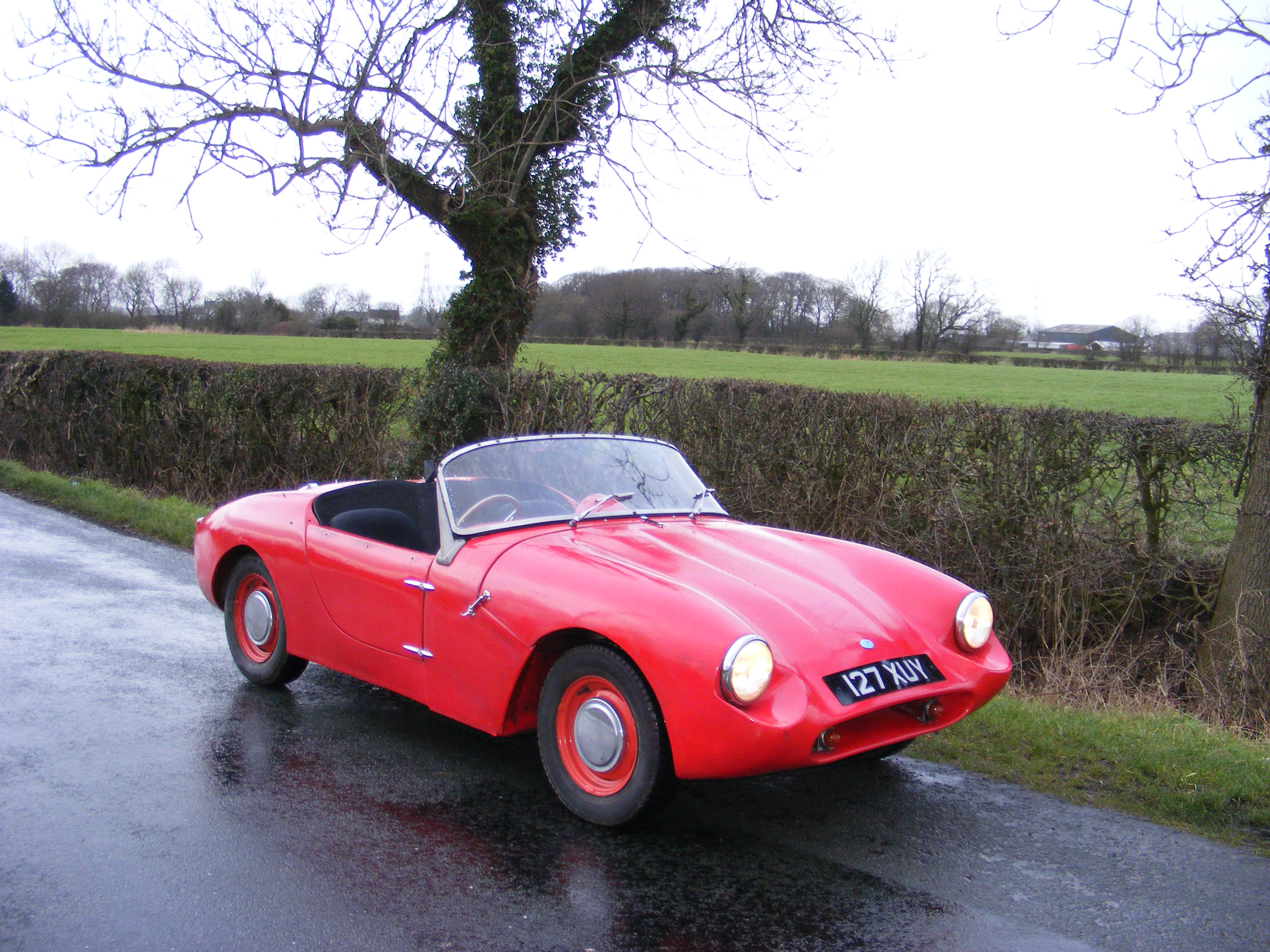
1962 Fairthorpe Electron Minor

== Atom and Atomota ==
The first cars were lightweight two-seat models powered by motorcycle engines and with glassfibre bodies.

The 1954 Atom was powered by a rear-mounted, two-stroke, air-cooled motor cycle engine driving the rear wheels through a three-speed Albion motor cycle gearbox and chain to the back axle. A choice of 250 cc or 350 cc BSA single cylinder and 322 cc Anzani twin-cylinder engines was offered. The body was mounted on a backbone chassis and had all independent suspension by coil springs and hydraulic brakes. 44 were made.

The Atomota replaced the Atom in 1957 and was a complete re-design with front-mounted engine and new chassis. The engine was a twin cylinder, 646 cc BSA overhead-valve unit from the BSA Golden Flash model. It was coupled to a Standard 10 gearbox and drove the rear wheels via a propeller shaft and hypoid bevel gear. The suspension used coil springs all round with trailing wishbones at the rear. The number made is uncertain and the last car seems to have been made in 1960.

== Electron ==
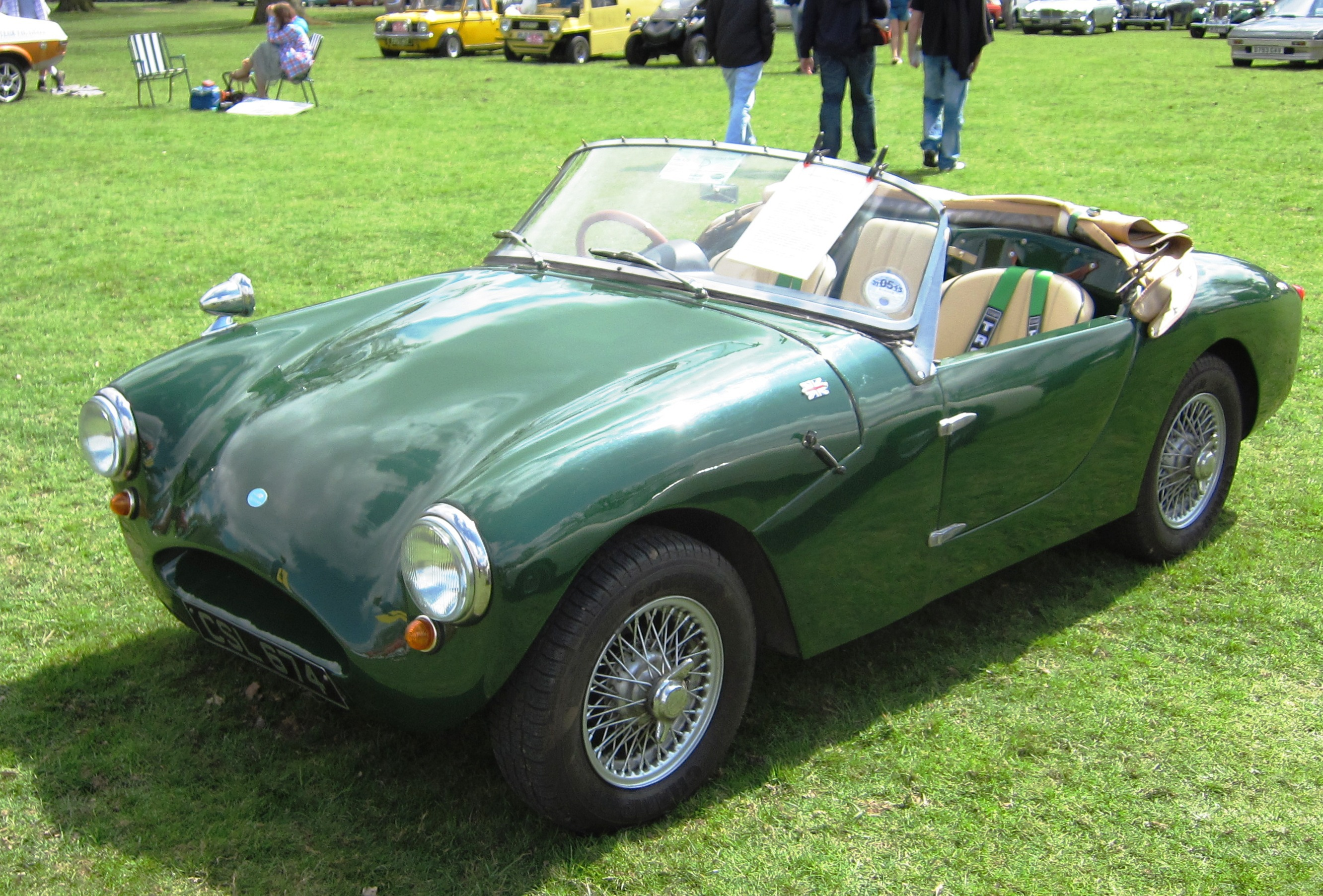
The 1957 Fairthorpe Electron Minor

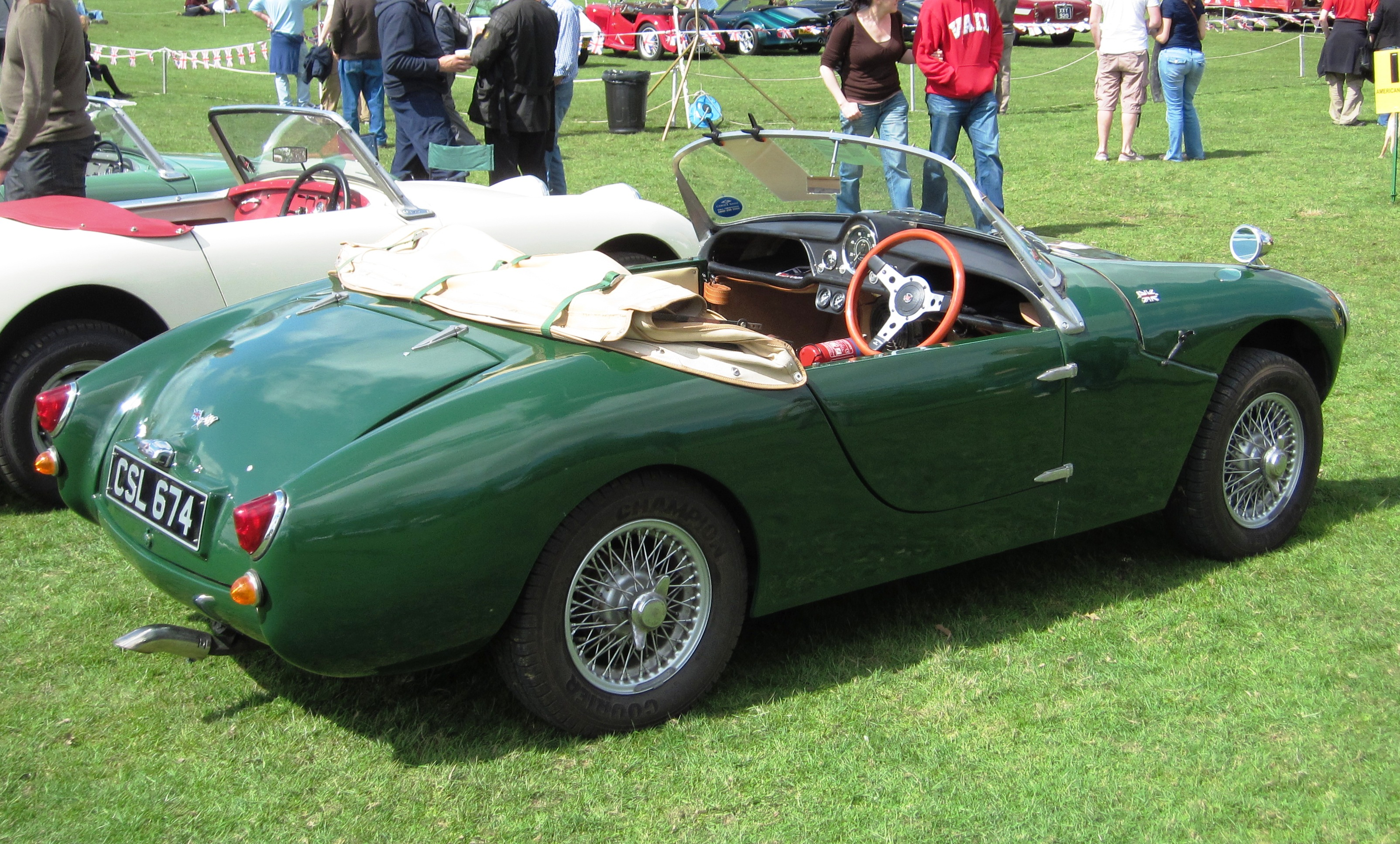
Fairthorpe Electron Minor

In 1956 a new larger car, the open 2-seat Electron appeared using a 1098 cc overhead-cam Coventry Climax engine. The front suspension was independent using coil springs and drum brakes were used all round. The engine was expensive for the company to buy resulting in a high price of £1050 (complete) or £734 (kit); only around 20-30 are thought to have been made.

A reduced price version the Electron Minor followed in 1957 using the Standard SC engine, transmission and rear axle from the Standard Ten. In 1963 the car received a larger version of the SC engine from the Triumph Spitfire and front disc brakes came from the same source in 1966. A hardtop was available as an option. With various specification changes the cars went from a Mark I to a Mark VI which had a Triumph GT6 chassis.

It was the mainstay of production until 1973 with about 700 being built.

There was also a closed 2+2 version with Triumph Herald mechanicals called the Electrina but only about 6 were produced.

The cars were available fully assembled or in kit form. Production peaked at about 20 cars a month.

== Zeta ==
The Zeta was introduced in 1959, powered by a modified six-cylinder Ford Zephyr engine of 2553 cc. It was offered in a choice of three stages of tune, with up to six carburettors and a BRM cylinder head, priced at £1,198, £1,281 and £1,407 respectively; the basic kit was available for £740. Very few, probably five, were made.

== Rockette ==
A new version of the Zeta, the Rockette, was introduced in 1962. Sporting a slightly modified glass-fibre body shell and using a Triumph Vitesse 1600 cc engine and Triumph independent front suspension. It was priced at £997, or £625 in kit form. Approximately 25 were made up to 1967.

== TX ==
In 1967 Donald Bennett's son Torix joined the company and a new car the TX-GT coupé based on a Triumph GT6 chassis but with transverse rod independent rear suspension was announced. The engine was the 1998 cc unit also from the GT6. By this time the market for hand-built small production cars was declining and the last model, the TX-S was a modified TX-GT with a variety of engines and the choice of the standard GT6 rear suspension. It could also be had as the TX-SS with Triumph fuel-injected engines. Only about 30 of the TX cars were made.

Another car, the TX Tripper, was produced by Torix's company, Technical Exponents, which shared premises with Fairthorpe. Looking like a psychedelic cross between a beach buggy and a sports car it was marketed as a TX and offered with either the Triumph chassis or a TX designed chassis. Triumph engines powered its various models: 1300, 2000, and 2500. About 20 were made.

== Cars ==
Fairthorpe Electrina

- Fairthorpe Atom (1954–57): 250 cc to 650 cc, chain drive
- Fairthorpe Atomota (1958–60): 650 cc, live rear axle
- Fairthorpe Electron (1956–65): Coventry Climax engine. Front disc from 1957. Final version with Triumph Spitfire engine. Body Microplas Mistral.
- Fairthorpe Electron Minor (1957–73): Standard 10/Triumph Herald engine. Final version on Triumph GT6 chassis with Spitfire engine (1968).
- Fairthorpe Electrina (1961–63): closed 4-seat version of the Electron
- Fairthorpe Zeta (1959–65): racing version
- Fairthorpe Rockette (1963–67): as Zeta but with Triumph Vitesse engine
- Fairthorpe TX-GT (1967–76): 2-seat coupe with Triumph 2-litre 6-cylinder engine
- Fairthorpe TX-S and TX-SS: (1969–76): similar to the TX-GT but with a wider variety of engine and transmission packages, all Triumph.

== See also ==
- List of car manufacturers of the United Kingdom
