= AC Petite =

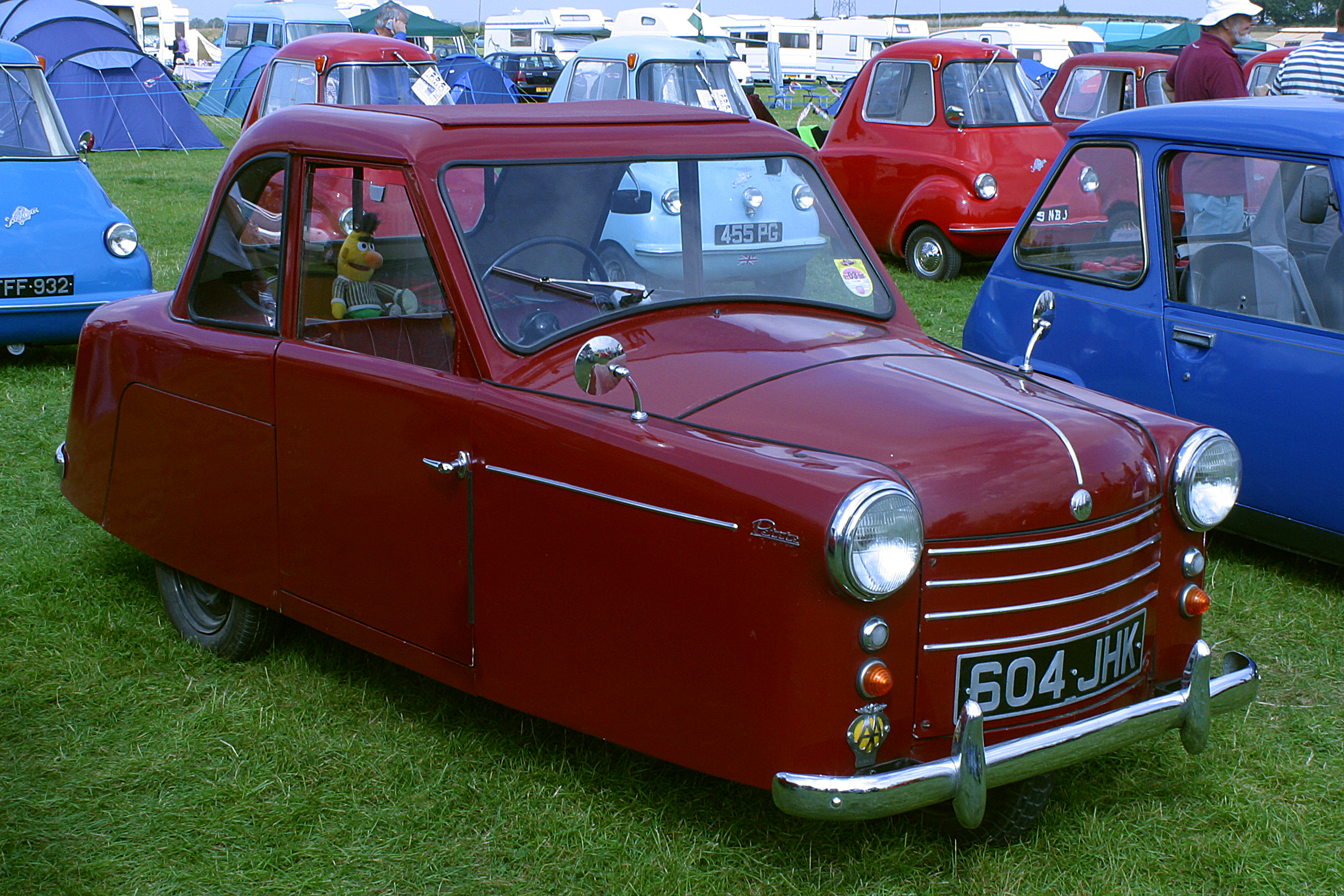
- 1956 AC Petite Mark II

Overview
- Manufacturer: AC Cars Ltd
- Production: 1952–1957
- Assembly: Thames Ditton, Surrey, England

Body and chassis
- Class: Microcar
- Body style: 2-door, 3-wheeled saloon (notchback)
- Layout: RR layout

Powertrain
- Engine: 350 cc (21 cu in), two-stroke, single

The AC Petite is a three-wheeled British microcar with a rear-mounted 350 cc (21 cu in) Villiers single cylinder, two-stroke engine. The car has a single bench seat seating two adults, and was said to be capable of 60 mpg_{‑imp} (4.7 L/100 km; 50 mpg_{‑US}) to 70 mpg_{‑imp} (4.0 L/100 km; 58 mpg_{‑US}) and 40 mph (64 km/h).

There were two versions of the car. Between 1952 and 1955 the car was fitted with a Villiers 27B engine and two different sizes of wheel; the rears were 18-inch (460 mm) spoked wheels whilst the front was only 8 inches (200 mm). In 1955 a Mark II version was launched, incorporating minor changes to the exterior trim, a slightly more powerful Villiers 28B engine and 12-inch (300 mm) wheels front and rear.

Approximately 4,000 AC Petites were built until 1957.

== Gallery ==
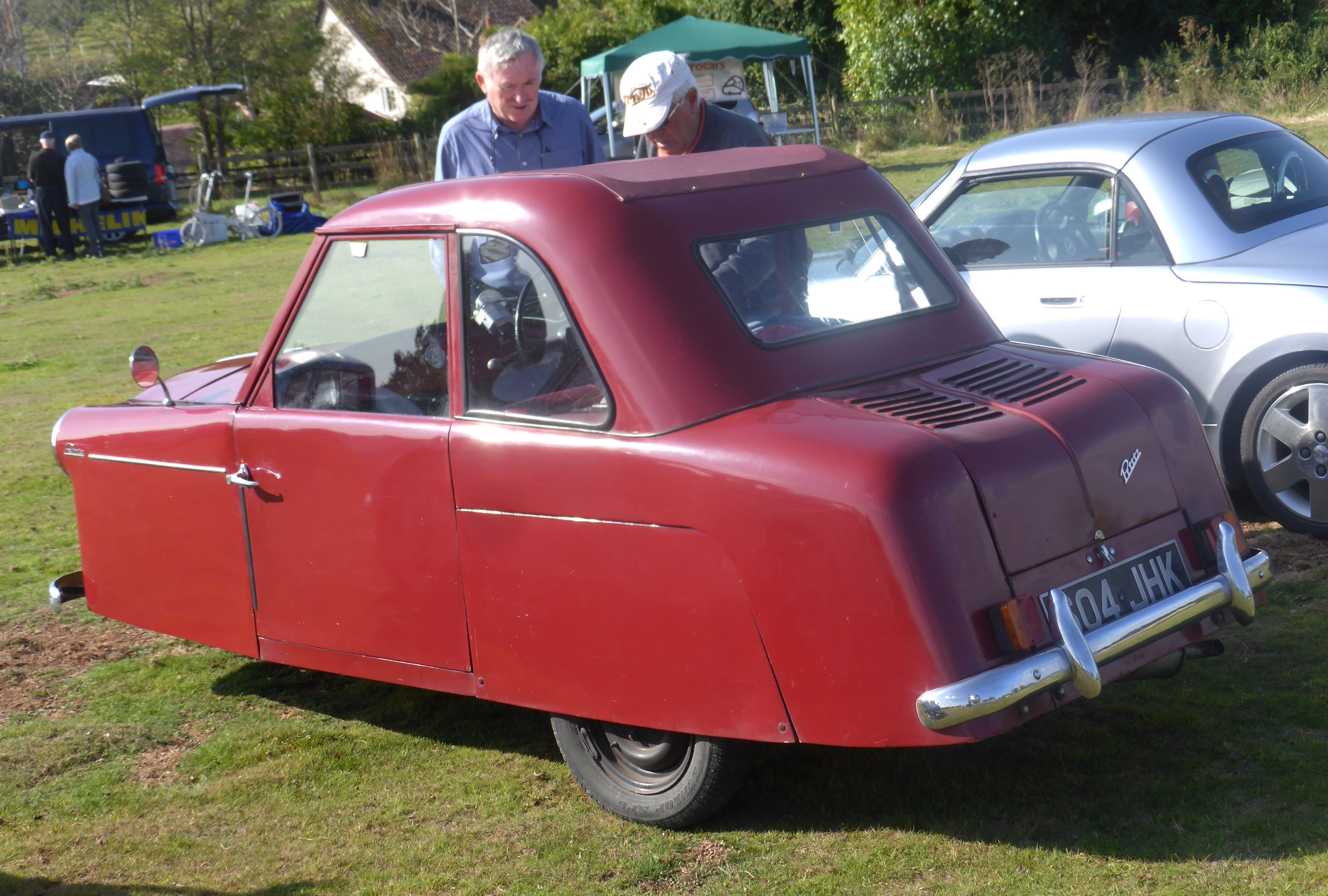
1954 AC Petite rear

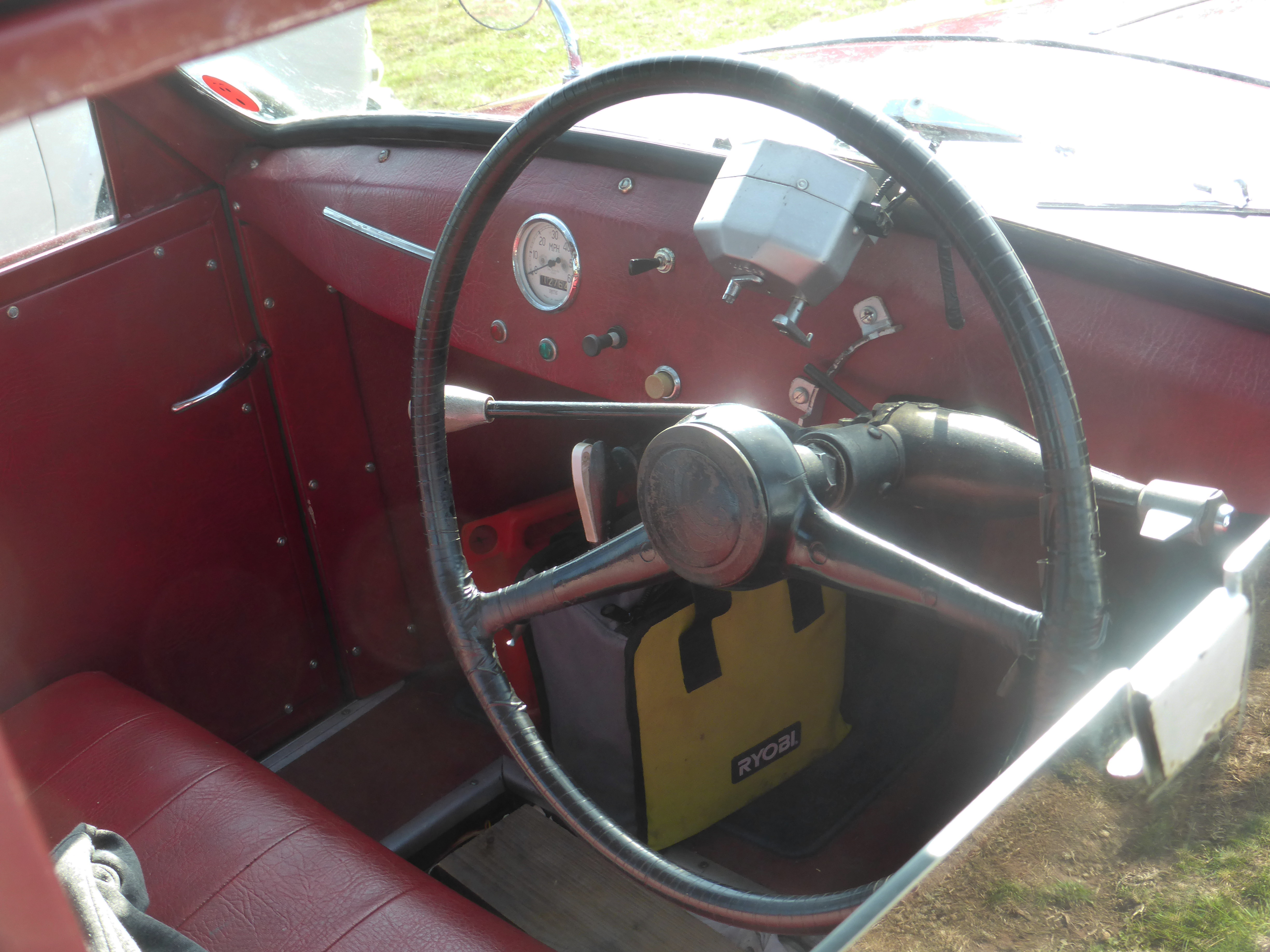
Interior

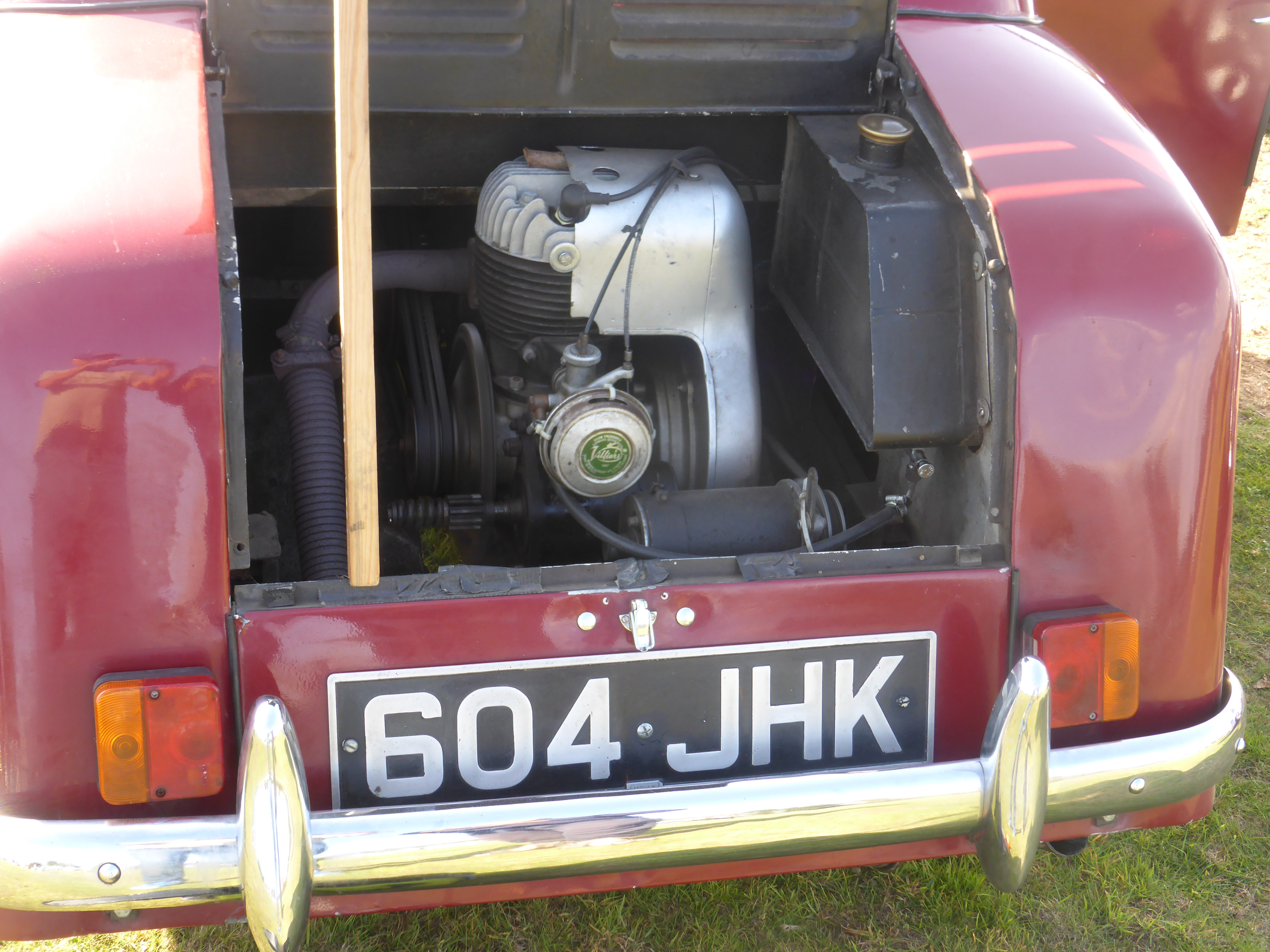
Engine

== See also ==
- List of microcars by country of origin
- AC Thundersley Invacar
- AC Autocarrier
