= Henry Meadows =

UK combustion engine supplier

Henry Meadows, usually known simply as Meadows, of Wolverhampton, England, were major suppliers of engines and transmissions to the smaller companies in the British motor industry. Founded in 1920 in Park Lane, Wolverhampton, as a car gearbox maker, they expanded into petrol engines in 1922 and in the 1930s built a large factory in Fallings Park, Wolverhampton.

== Products ==
=== Petrol engines ===
Early production was connected with the move from W. H. Dorman & Co of the Dorman works manager (W. H. Dorman's son, John E. Dorman) in August 1921, and a design engineer Mr R. S. Crump. Dorman had been producing engines from 1903. The early Meadows engines and gearboxes were produced with Meadows-Dorman on the castings. This resulted in a court case between Dorman and Meadows, claiming that this was a misuse of the Dorman name and reputation. Dorman won the case

1½-litre four-cylinder Type 4ED engine in 1927 Alvis Super Sports car

One of the most popular petrol engines was the 1½-litre four-cylinder Type 4ED engine (following their less powerful 4EB and 4EC engines, used by several makers in the pre 1931 period), widely used by Frazer Nash and Lea-Francis during the 1920s and 30s, and in the H.R.G. light car from 1936 to 1939 which was sold with a guaranteed top speed of 90 mph (140 km/h). Another successful product, the 4½-litre 6-cylinder engine is best remembered as the power unit for Invicta and Lagonda cars.

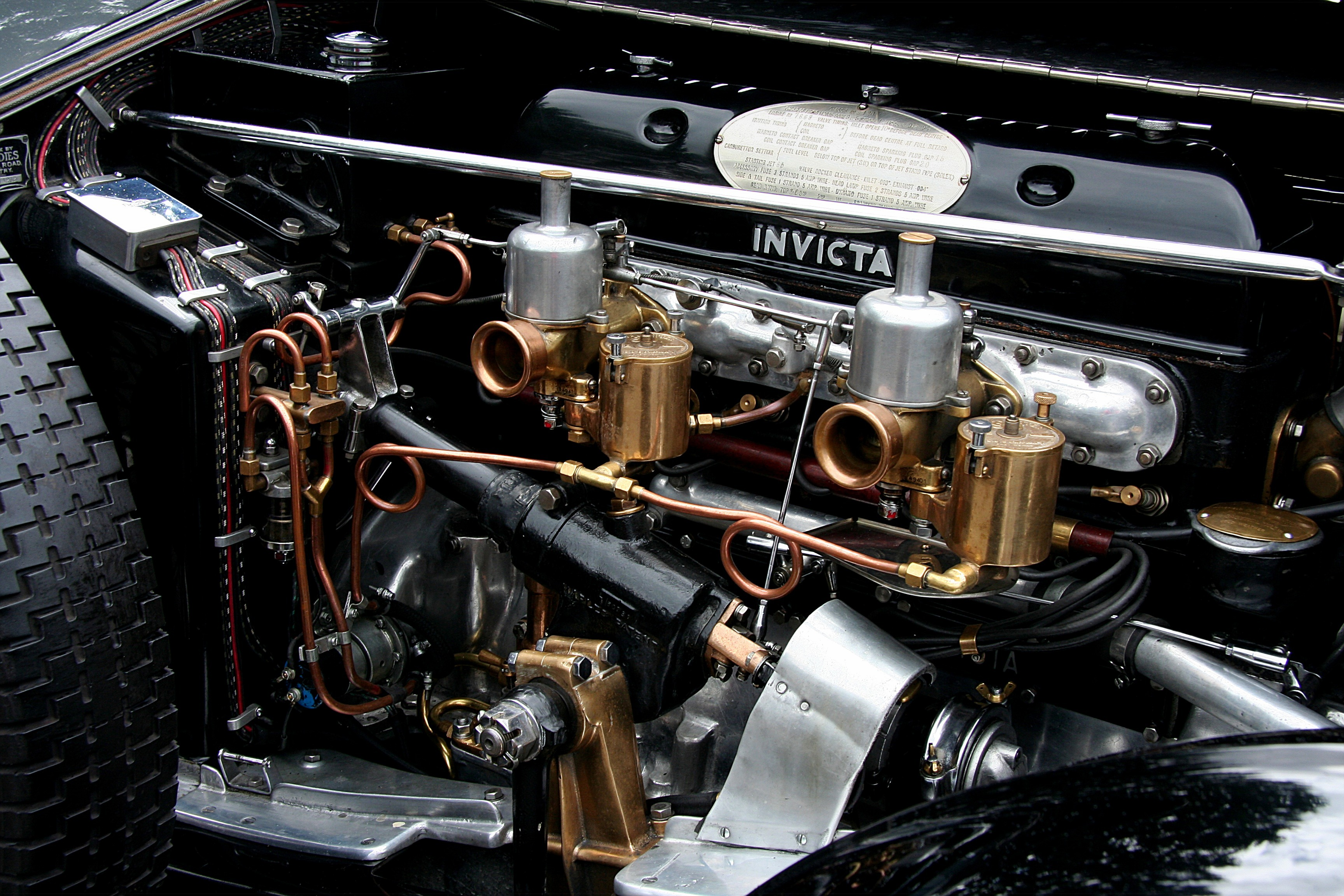
4½-litre six-cylinder engine in a 1931 Invicta car

Meadows also produced marine engines after a visit from Hubert Scott-Paine in 1931 who was looking for some better engines for his prototype seaplane tender (RAF200) which was fitted at that time with Brooks engines. After some modification to allow the engines to be angled at 17 degrees, the British Power Boat Company selected Meadows 6-cylinder petrol engines for the high-speed seaplane tenders, each having two engines rated at 100 bhp (75 kW) and being capable of 29 kn (54 km/h; 33 mph).

In the 1930s, Meadows developed a flat-12 type-MAT/1 engine of 8,858cc for military applications including the Tetrarch Light Tank. Later they built a 16-litre 300 bhp (220 kW) flat-12 type-DAV petrol engine used in the Covenanter tank This engine was also used in the prototype A20 tank, although this weighed more than twice the Covenanter and so was considered underpowered. The later, and widely used, A22 Churchill tank was a development of the A20. Partly to provide more power, and also to improve production time, this was instead powered by a Vauxhall flat-12 engine termed the "Twin-Six", as it was based on two existing Bedford six-cylinder lorry engines. This engine was slightly more powerful, but to only a rated 350 bhp (260 kW). The Guy armoured car, made in 1939–1940, used the Meadows 4-cylinder 4-ELA petrol engine.

Meadows also made the 600 bhp (450 kW) Rolls-Royce Meteor V-12 petrol tank engine from 1944. This came about because Rolls-Royce Merlin engines came under the Ministry of Aircraft Production, but tank engines came under the Ministry of Supply, and the huge demand for the Merlin engine was causing Meteor production to falter and this was in turn affecting Cromwell tank production. Meadows was already involved with the Ministry of Supply, so they were brought in from 1944 to manufacture Meteor engines to cover the shortfall. The Rover Company also produced Meteor engines in this period.

=== Diesel engines ===
Meadows started developing diesel engines in the 1930s, and a 5-litre, 4-cylinder diesel developing 75 bhp (56 kW) at 2,000 rpm was launched at the 1935 Olympia Motor Transport Show. They introduced a 6-cylinder 100 bhp (75 kW) version in 1938. Both of these engines used a Lanova combustion chamber design, CAV injector pumps, and they were listed both for road transport and marine use. In 1938, they supplied diesel engines for the New Zealand Railways Standard class railcars.

After the Second World War, they resumed making diesel engines, but with a new design this time with direct injection and toroidal cavity pistons. The 6.9-litre 4-cylinder unit gave 85 bhp (63 kW) at 1,800 rpm and the 10.35-litre 6-cylinder unit developed 150 bhp (110 kW) at 1,800 rpm. These were aimed at both vehicle, marine, and stationary markets, and there was a horizontal version of the 6-cylinder unit for flat underfloor mounting. The same two engines were rated at 60 and 90 bhp (45 and 67 kW) for continuous marine use at 1,600 rpm, and a larger engine of similar design rated at 130 bhp (97 kW) and of 15.5-litre capacity was also listed. One of the unusual features of these engines is the ability to swap the utilities from side to side and from end to end, which also allows for making handed-engines for twin-engined marine craft. For marine use helical reduction gears of different ratios, and epicyclic reversing gears were also available. Many engines were supplied to their neighbour in Fallings Park, Guy Motors for use in their buses and trucks. A small number of diesel engines was supplied for British Rail Railbuses in 1958. They also powered the Fowler Challenger crawler tractors, the 6DC-630 in the Mk III, and the 6DJ-970 in the Mk IV. Meadows adverts show they were also used in plant like rock-crushers, ditch diggers, compressors and other equipment used in road building. They were also used to power military FV2502 27.5kVA generator sets.

Engine Models (list incomplete), the letter after the 'D' varies according to application (e.g. M = marine) :

- Pre-War four cylinder. Bore 105mm, Stroke 150mm.
- Pre-War six cylinder. Bore 105mm, Stroke 130mm.
- 4DC-330 Four cylinder diesel. Bore 120mm, Stroke 120mm, 331 cu. in. - 5.43 litres capacity
- 6DC-630 Six cylinder diesel. Bore 130mm, Stroke 130mm, 630 cu in - 10.35 litres capacity
- 6HDC-500 Six cylinder horizontal diesel. 500 cu.in. - 8.14 litres capacity
- 6DJ-970 Six cylinder diesel. 970 cu.in. - 15.5 litres

=== Gearboxes ===
Meadows had started by making gearboxes in 1920, initially for lorries made by the Vulcan Motor & Engineering Co and then Coventry Climax Ltd. After engines were introduced in 1922 they sold complete engine, clutch, and gearbox packages, initially with either 3 or 4 speed gearboxes, and later with 4 or 5 speed gearboxes. During the early 1950s, Meadows supplied gearboxes for the Jowett Javelin car.

=== Cars ===
They were also responsible for making the Meadows Frisky microcar between 1957 and 1961.

== Merger and closure ==
In 1965, Henry Meadows was purchased by Jaguar.
