= Excelsior Motor Company =

British bicycle and motorcycle company

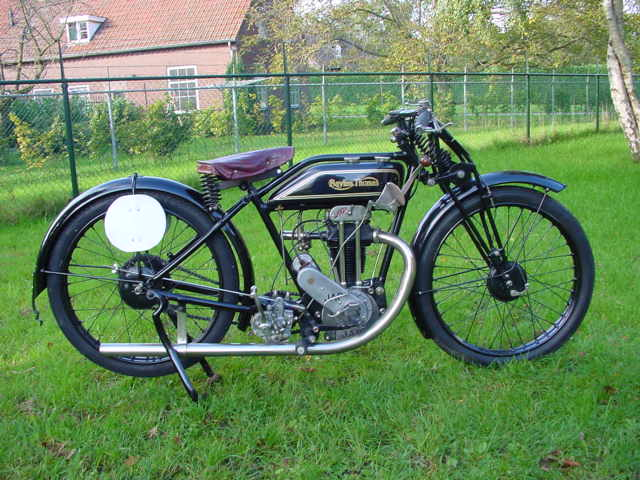
1927 Excelsior

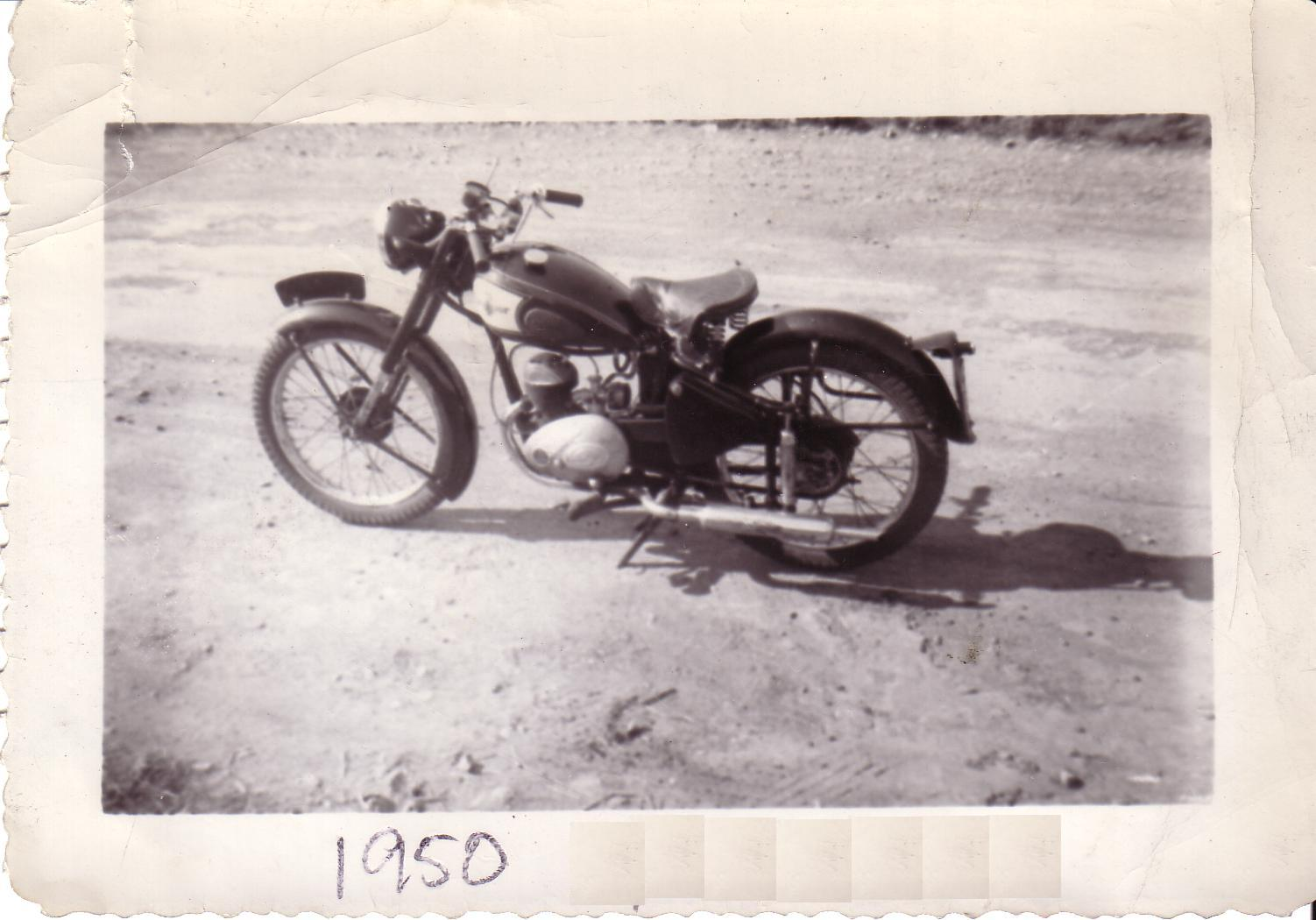
1950 Excelsior Universal 125cc

Excelsior, based in Coventry, was a British bicycle, motorcycle and car maker. They were Britain’s first motorcycle manufacturer, starting production of their own ‘motor-bicycle’ in 1896. At first, they had premises at Lower Ford Street, Coventry, and 287-295 Stoney Stanton Road, Hillfields, Coventry, Warwickshire before moving to Kings Road, Tyseley, Birmingham in 1921.

Originally a bicycle company making penny-farthings in 1874 under their original name: Bayliss, Thomas and Co, they later sold bicycles under the names of Excelsior and Eureka and changed the company name to Excelsior Motor Co. in 1910. In the early years of motor-bicycle manufacture they used Minerva, De Dion, MMC and possibly a Condor 850 cc single but went on to produce a wide range of machines with engines from most major manufacturers. In 1914, they offered a JAP-powered twin. A deal to supply the Russian Imperial government with motorcycles ended with the revolution, and Excelsior wound up with an excess inventory as a result.

The Walker family (father Reginald and son Eric) took over after World War I. R Walker & Sons of Tyseley, Birmingham had started as makers of ships lamps but in 1919 had made a range of motorcycles under the Monarch name to be sold by the London Department store Gamages. The company was re-registered as the Excelsior Motor Company Ltd, production moved to Birmingham and the Lower Ford Street factory in Coventry sold to Francis-Barnett. They made a range of motorcycles from 98 to 1,000 cc, mostly powered by JAP, Blackburne and Villiers engines, plus an 850 cc Condor engine. The new company put more effort in competition and racing. To avoid confusion with the US maker of the same name, they called themselves "British Excelsior".

== Excelsior Motorcycles ==
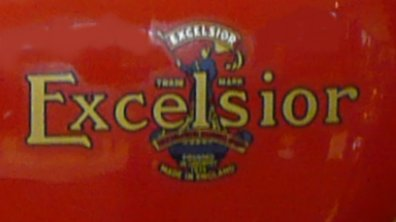

=== Racing Heyday ===
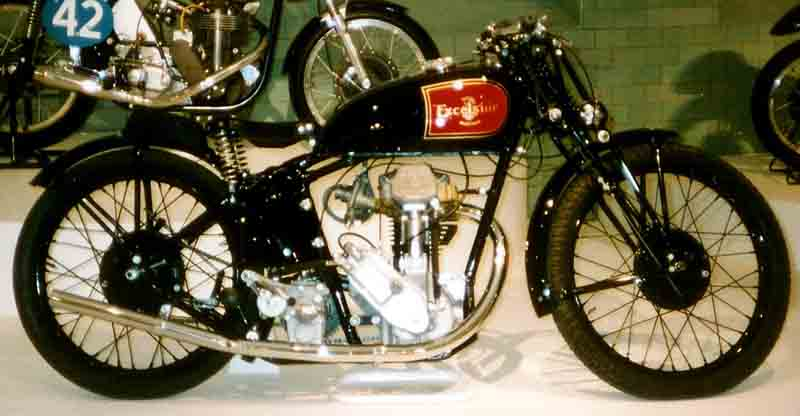
Excelsior Manxman 250 cc 1935

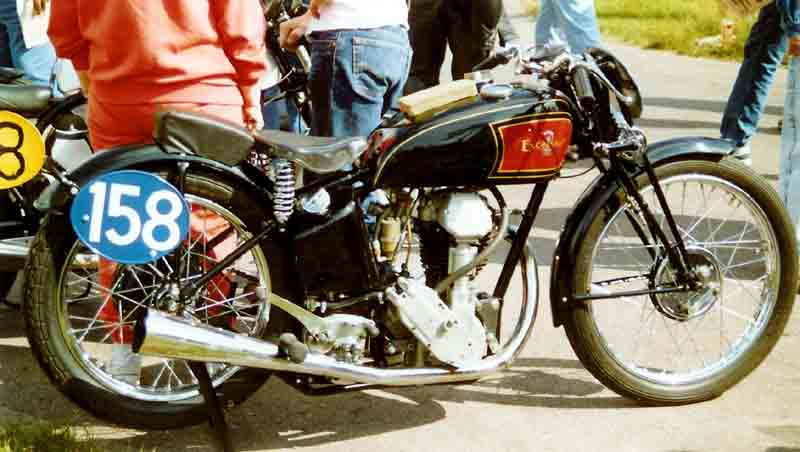
Excelsior Manxman 350 cc OHC 1935

Their first major racing success was in 1929 when they took the Lightweight TT race on a B14, soon to be their most popular model. Emerged from the Great Depression in a sound financial state, Excelsior commissioned Blackburne to design a 4-valve racing engine. Known as the Mechanical Marvel, it won the 1933 TT in its first outing. The complex machine continued with great success on the Continent but was retired at the end of the 1934 season as it was too complex to offer for sale as a production racer. That role was filled from 1935 by the 2-valve overhead camshaft Manxman.

The Manxman was first raced at the 1935 Isle of Man Lightweight TT. The works machine had a left port aluminium cylinder head and barrel, but had a very long stroke, and was slow. The following year saw the first appearance of shorter stroke four-valve overhead-cam racers. They raced again in 1937 TT in both 250 and 350 capacities, but were retired in May 1938 before that year's TT. The TT motorcycles reverted to 2-valve heads but had plunger rear suspension. They were just as quick as the 4-valvers and much easier to set up. Excelsior did not officially contest the 1939 TT but a syndicate raced the previous year's machines as well as a prototype 500cc production racer. The Excelsior Manxman did not win a TT before the war, but it came second in 1936, '37 and '38, and 3rd in '39. Perhaps its greatest success was winning the European GP in front of 200,000 people at Chemnitz in Germany in 1936.

=== World War II ===
Excelsior's major contribution to the war effort was the 98 cc (6 in^{3}) Welbike, a small, collapsible motorcycle delivered in a pod by parachute, intended to be used by paratroops for rapid movement around a battlefield. The Welbike inspired the post-War Brockhouse Corgi.

=== Post-war ===
But the company wasn't doing well and in the lean years following World War II racing and luxury machines were sidelined in favour of cheap two-stroke engines. After the war, they used Villiers engines to make the 250 cc Viking and in 1949 they used their own engine for the Talisman Twin, a smooth two-stroke with 180-degree crank. A later 328 cc twin-carburettor sports version, the S8, did not sell well, although the engine itself achieved some success in Berkeley microcars in both 328 cc twin and 492 cc triple versions. In opposition to the Talisman engine, the Villiers twin engine was introduced in 1956, which was used by many small manufacturers.

== Bayliss-Thomas cars ==
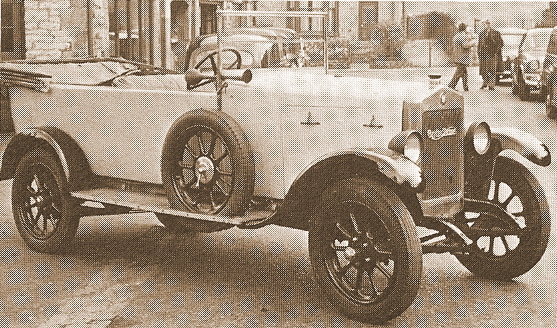
1923 Bayliss-Thomas 10-20 hp

In 1919 the company made an experimental 3-wheel car with air-cooled engine, but this did not go into production. But, in 1920 Excelsior entered the car business with a range of 4-wheel models and used the name Bayliss-Thomas as there was already a Belgian car called the Excelsior.

Around 1,000 were made.

Cars were still listed in catalogues until 1931 but it is likely that none were made after 1929.

=== Car models ===
Type	Year	Engine	Body types	Wheelbase	Notes
8.9 Junior (9/19 from 1924)	1922–1924	1075 cc 4-cylinder side-valve	open four-seater, sports	99 in (2,515 mm)	3-speed gearbox
10/20 (11/22 from 1925)	1924–1927	1498 cc 4-cylinder side-valve Coventry-Simplex	open four-seater, sports	99 in (2,515 mm)	9/19 with 10.8 engine. Front wheel brakes from 1927.
10.8	1922–1924	1498 cc 4-cylinder side-valve Coventry-Simplex	sliding door saloon, two- and four-seat open tourer, coupé, sports	102 in (2,591 mm) or 108 in (2,743 mm)	3-speed gearbox
12/22 (12/27 from 1925)	1925–1931	1500 cc 4-cylinder side-valve Meadows	tourer, sports tourer, 4-light saloon, 6-light saloon, drophead coupé	114 in (2,896 mm)	3-speed gearbox. Front-wheel brakes from 1927.
13/30	1925–1926	1795 cc 4-cylinder side-valve Meadows	tourer, sports tourer, 4-light saloon, 6-light saloon, drophead coupé	114 in (2,896 mm)	4-speed gearbox

== Closure ==
Excelsior last manufactured a motorcycle in 1964 and folded in 1965. Britax, a car accessory company bought the name and produced limited numbers of Britax-Excelsior machines in the late 1970s.

The head office address was: The Excelsior Motor Co, Kings Road, Tyseley, Birmingham 11.

The Head Office and Works address according to a 1962 edition (4/9/62) of the Talisman Twin 244cc and 328cc Running and Maintenance Instructions was Redfern Road, Tyseley Birmingham 11. Telephone: Acocks Green 1677–8–9. "Telegrams: Monarch, Haymills"

== See also ==
- List of car manufacturers of the United Kingdom
- List of motorcycles of the 1890s
- List of motorcycles of 1900 to 1909
- List of motorcycles of the 1910s
- List of motorcycles of the 1920s
