= Bike-engined car =

Type of modified car

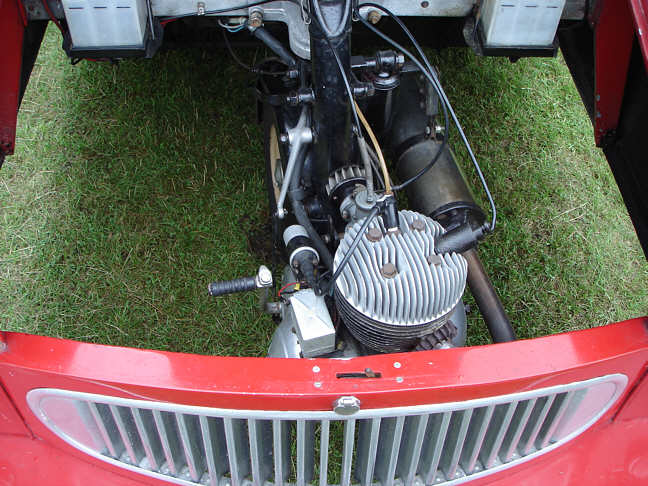
Engine bay of a 1959 Bond Minicar

A bike-engined car is a small or light weight car that is powered by an engine that was designed for use in a motorcycle.

== Characteristics ==
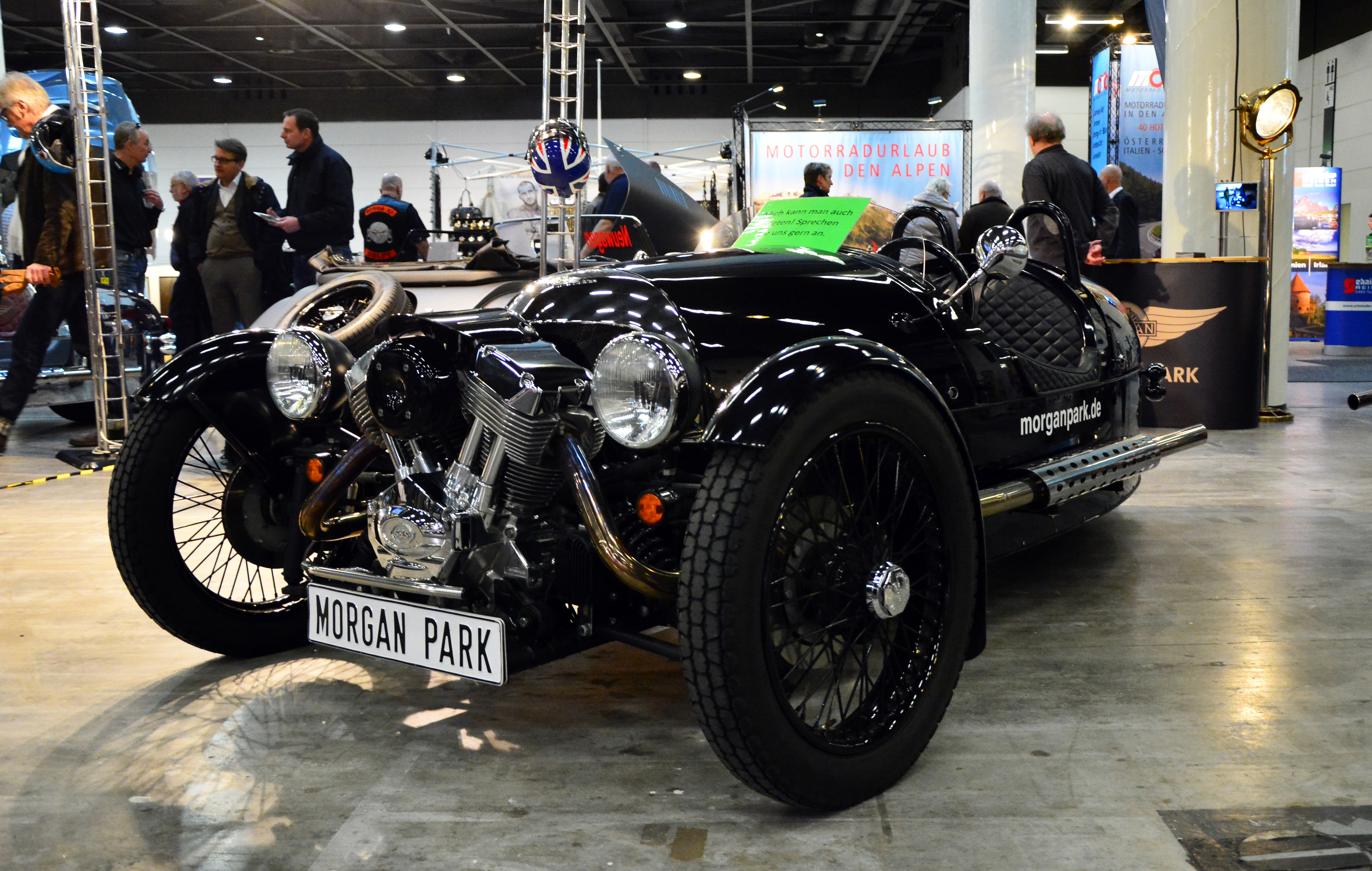
2015 Morgan 3-Wheeler

Early examples of bike-engined cars include the 1948 Invacar and the 1949 Bond Minicar, both of which were designed as basic, low-cost transportation.

Modern motorcycle engines are often available with higher specific outputs than car engines, which provides a performance advantage in a lightweight car. The motorcycle's sequential gearbox is often fitted with the engine, allowing for fast gearshifts.

The drawbacks of using motorcycle engines in cars are the lack of reverse gear and reduced torque output at low RPM.

Performance models of bike-engined cars are often based on the Lotus 7-type kit cars.

== Motor racing ==
In the United Kingdom, the 750 Motor Club runs a national race series for cars powered by road going motorcycle engines (RGB series). Radical Sportscars also runs a racing series for its bike-engined cars.

In the United States, the Lites 2 category of IMSA Prototype Lites (formerly IMSA Lites) consists of cars using a Kawasaki motorcycle engine.

The Formula BMW junior racing series (often used as a stepping stone towards Formula One) used open-wheel cars powered by the BMW K1200RS motorcycle engine.

== List of production cars with motorcycle engines ==
- AC Petite (1952-1957)
- Berkeley T60, T60/4, B65 (1956-1960)
- BMW 600 (1957-1959)
- BMW 700 (1959-1965)
- Bond Minicar (1949-1966)
- Fairthorpe (1954-1960)
- Frisky (1958-1959)
- Heinkel Kabine (1956-1958)
- Honda Z (1970-1971)
- Invacar (1948-1972)
- Isetta (1953-1962)
- Morgan three-wheeler (1911-1939)
- Opperman (1956-1959)
- Peel P50 (1962-1965)
- Peel Trident (1965-1966)
- Piaggio Ape (1948-present)
- Scootacar (1957-1964)
- Tourette (1956-1958)
- Triking (1977-2006)
- Velorex Oskar (1945-1973)

== Non-production motorcycle-engined cars ==
- Suzuki GSX-R/4
- Westfield Megabusa
- Westfield XTR2

These are all Suzuki Hayabusa-engined cars. The Hayabusa engine has also been used in Radical Sportscars, the Caterham Seven and Ariel Atom.

== See also ==
- Cyclecar
- Kei car
- List of motorcycles by type of engine
