= 1st German Toyota Museum =

German Museum

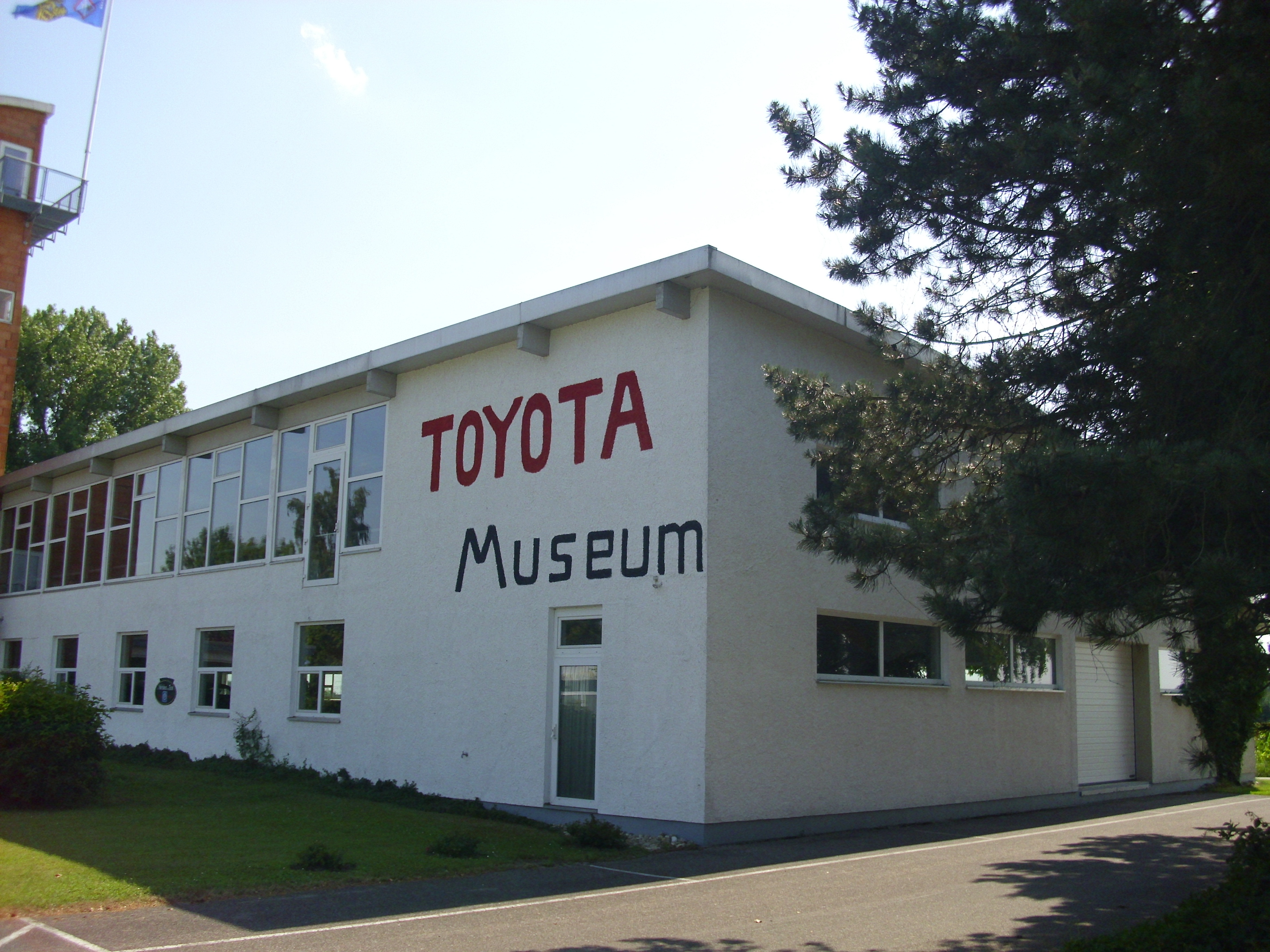
- Part of the building
- Established: 1994
- Dissolved: 2017
- Location: Pocking-Hartkirchen (Pocking)|Hartkirchen, Germany
- Type: Automobile museum
- Curator: Peter Pichert

The 1st German Toyota Museum was an automobile museum in Germany. Slightly different spellings include 1. Deutsches Toyota Museum, First German Toyota Museum and First German Toyota Museum.

== History ==
Peter Pichert (1944–2016) was one of the first car dealers of the Japanese brand Toyota in Germany starting in 1971. He began collecting used vehicles of this brand. In 1994, he founded the museum in the district of Hartkirchen in the city of Pocking in the Bavarian district of Passau.

It had regular opening hours six days a week. An annual classic car meeting was held at the museum.

The collection last included 120 vehicles. After Peter Pichert's death, the museum remained open until July 1, 2017. Then, Toyota Germany took over the vehicles for its Toyota Collection in Cologne.

== Exhibits ==
More than 120 cars, 3 trucks, and buses as well as 15 engines were exhibited. Notable exhibits included a 1967 Toyota 2000GT, a Toyota Land Cruiser previously owned by Roger Moore, and a Toyota WRC Corolla driven by Carlos Sainz Sr.

The individual vehicle models: Toyota 1000, 2000 GT, Camry, Carina, Celica, Corolla, Corona, Cressida, Crown, Hiace, Land Cruiser, Model F, MR 2, Prius, Sera, Starlet, Supra and Tercel, plus a tricycle from Velorex and a VW Beetle from 1953.

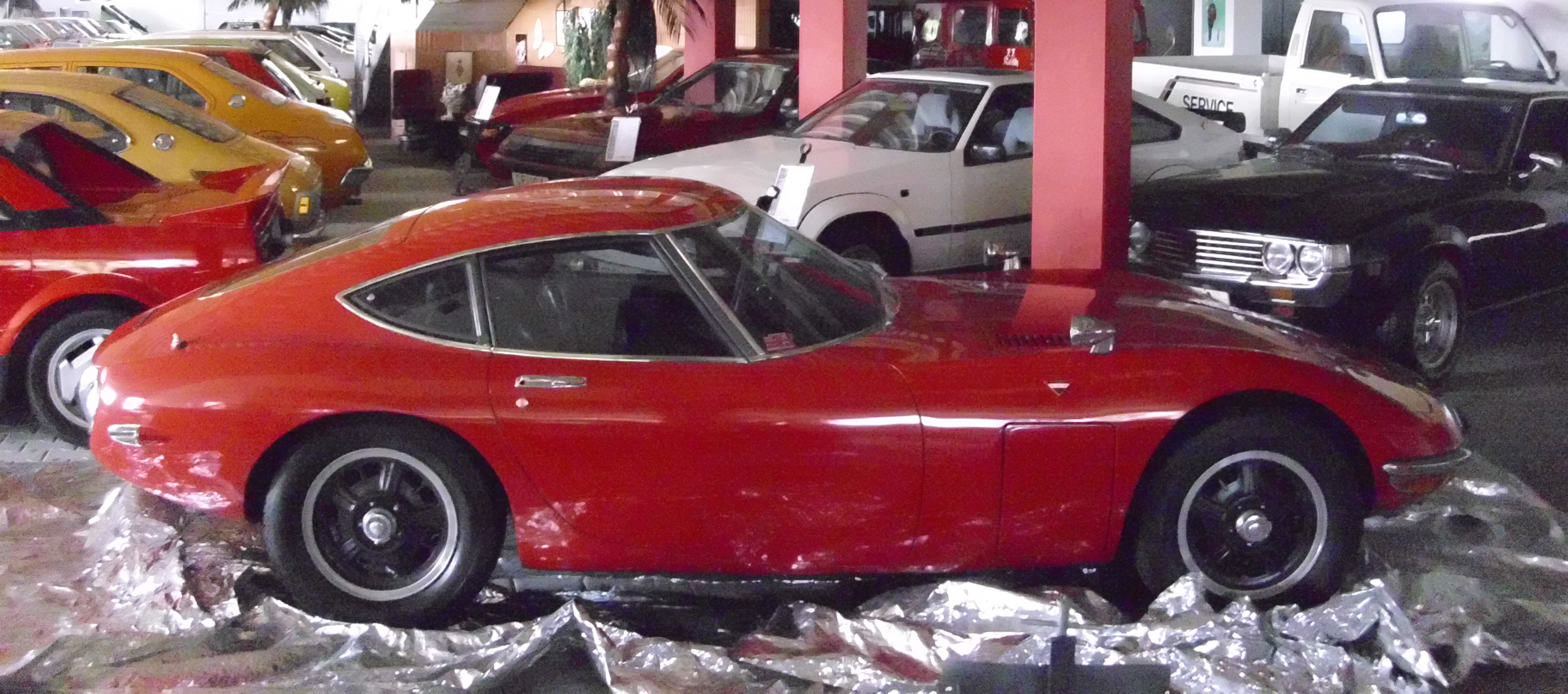
2000 GT 1967

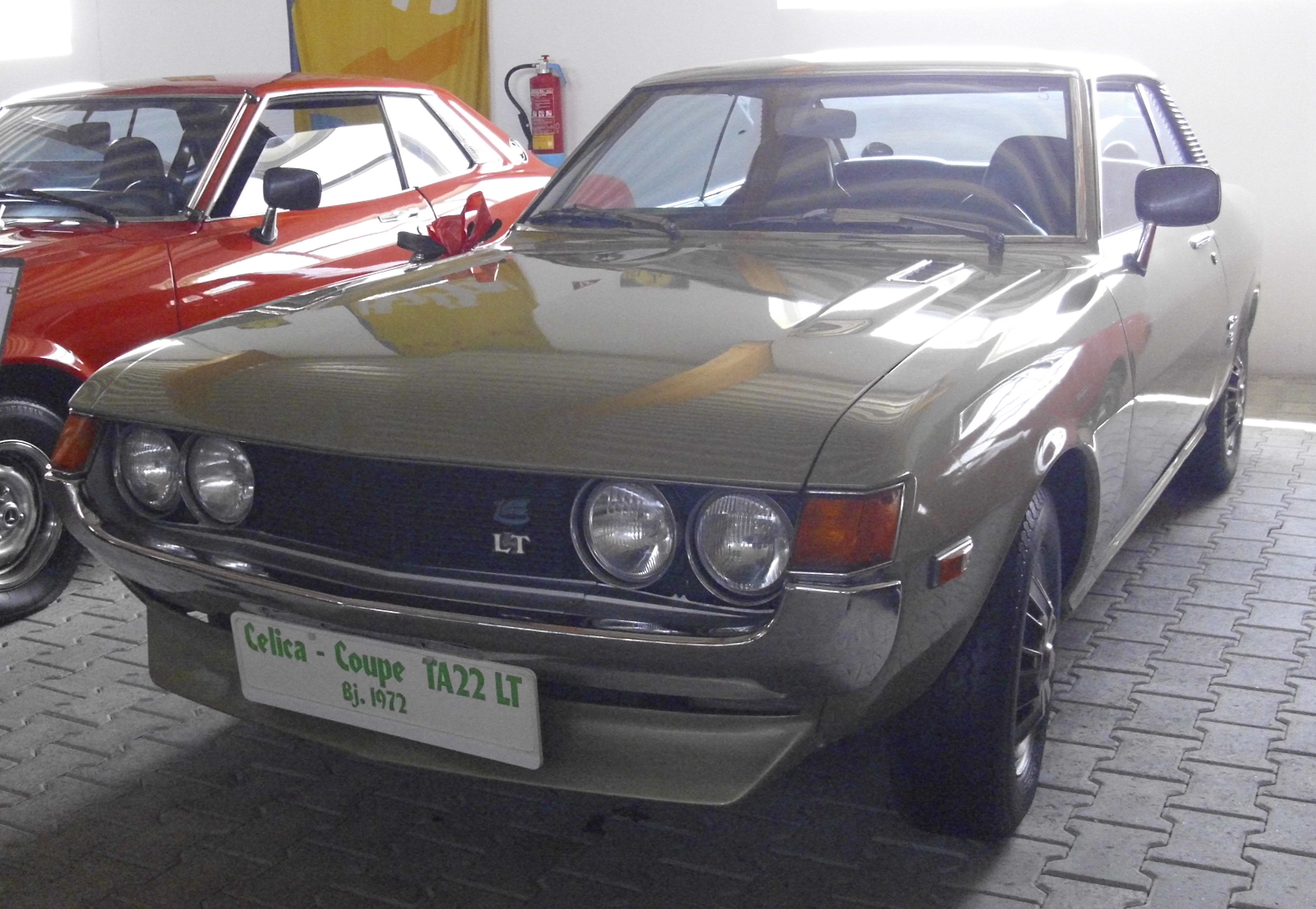
Celica 1972

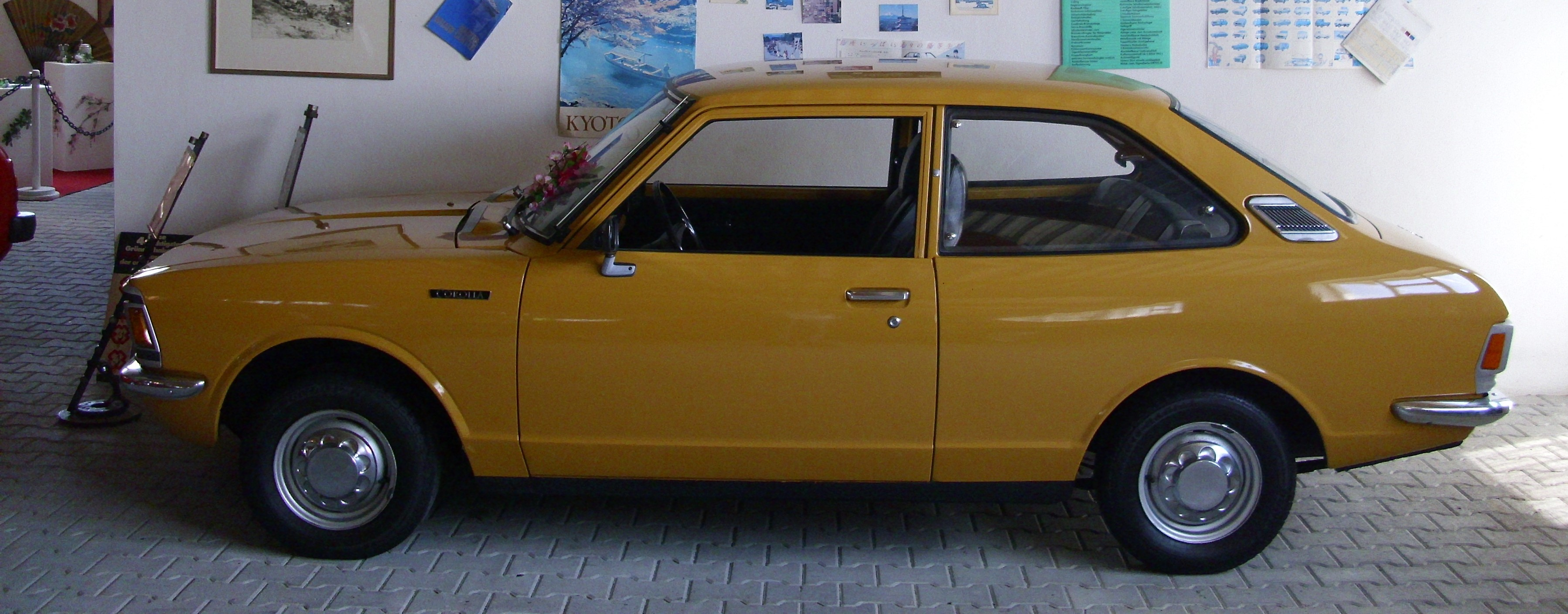
Corolla 1973

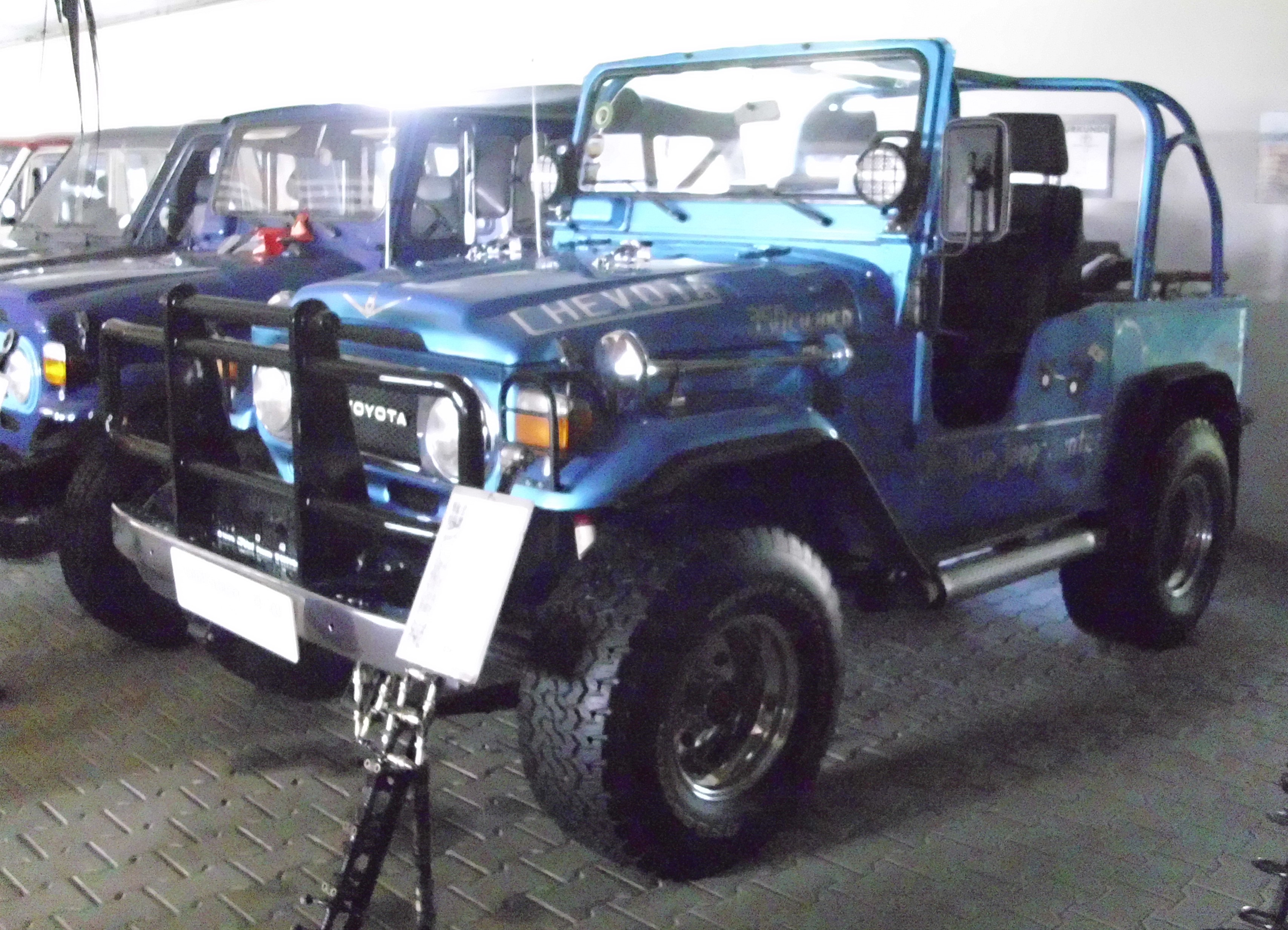
Land Cruiser 1978

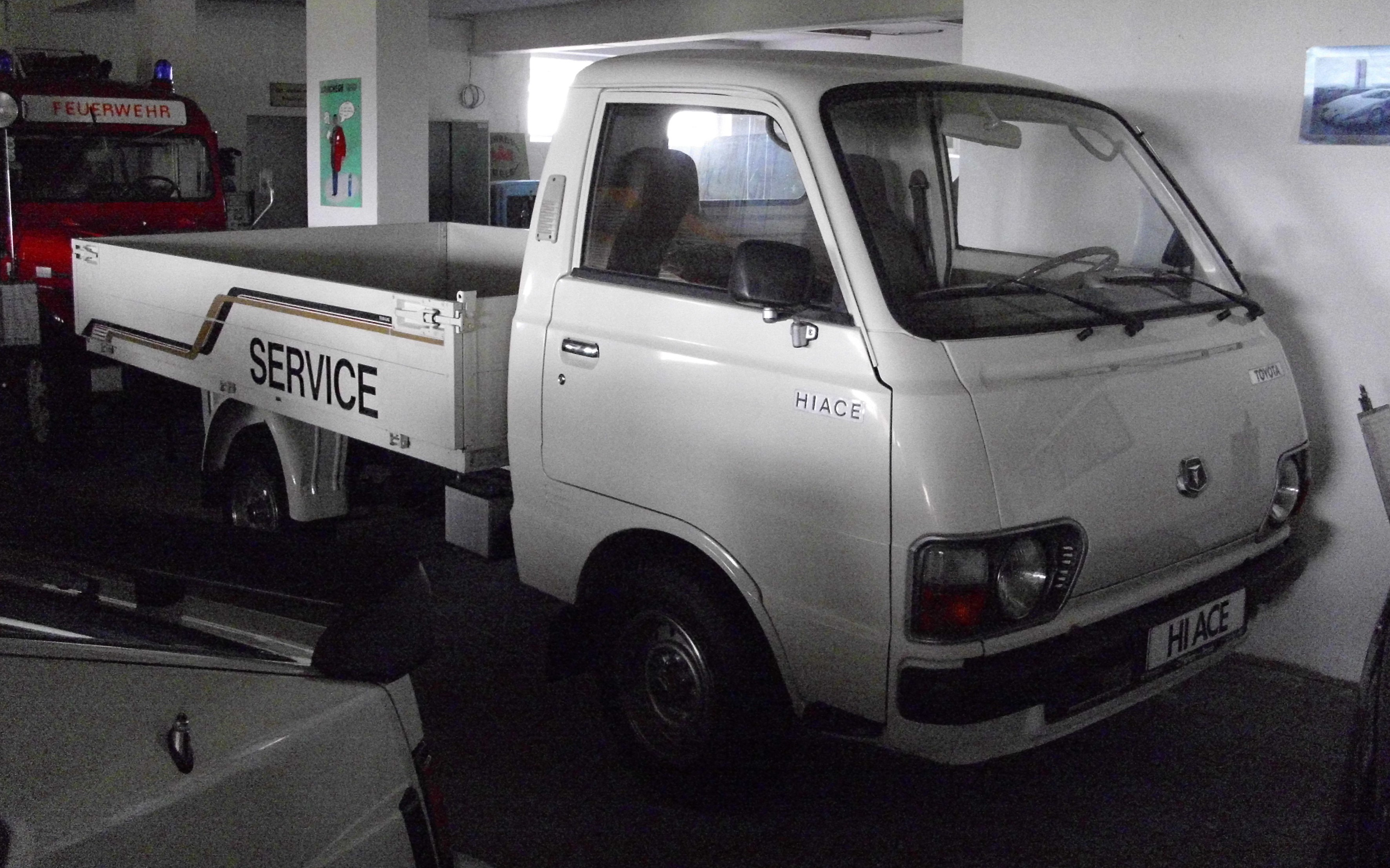
Hiace 1980

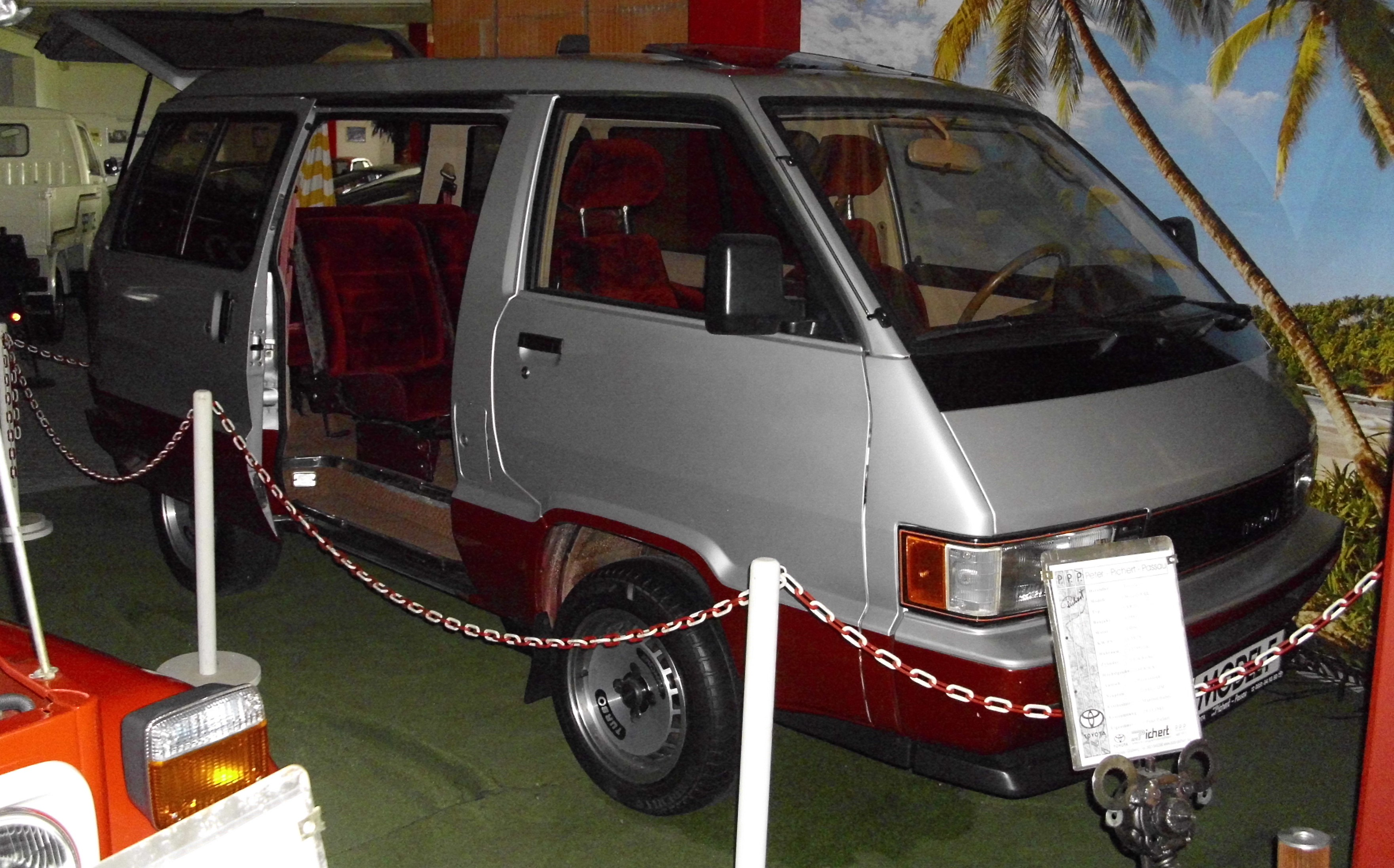
Model F 1983

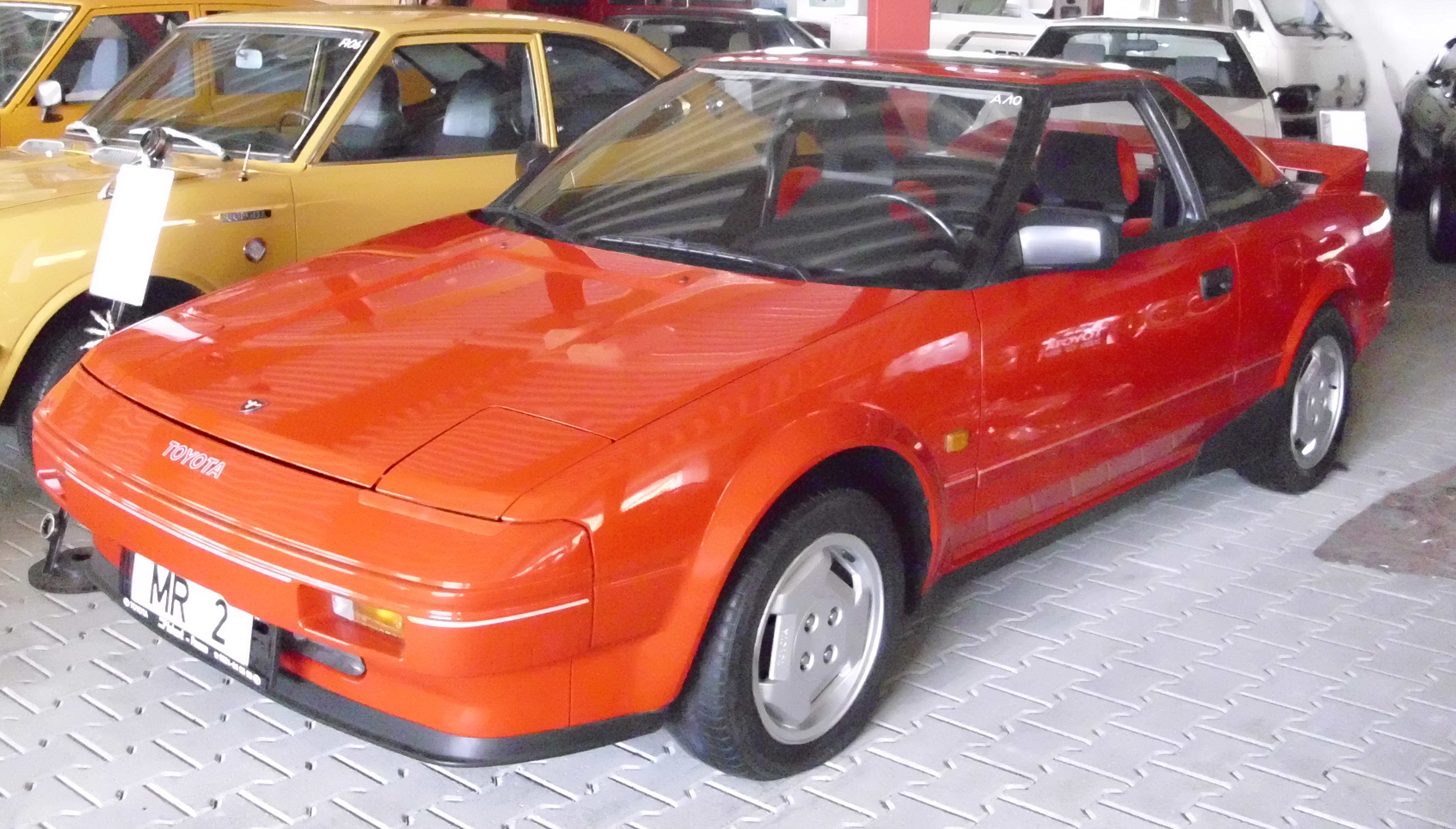
MR 2 1985

== Literature ==
- Dieter Lammersdorf: Oldtimermuseen in Deutschland. Johann Kleine Vennekate-Verlag, Lemgo 2014, ISBN 3-935517-06-8.
- Christian Steiger: Hall of Fame. In: Auto Zeitung. Classic Cars, Issue 4/2020, Toyota-Extra, pp. 18–21.
- Südkurve. In: Motor Klassik. Issue 9/2006, pp. 42–44.
