= List of microcars by country of origin: C =

== List ==
Country	Automobile Name	Manufacturer	Engine Make/Capacity	Seats	Year	Other information
Canada	SOLO	Electra Meccanica	53 hp electric	1	2020-	100 mile EPA range; 80 mph top speed; 0-60 mph in 10 s.
Chile	Sôki	Voze EV		2	2015-	
China	Shuanghuan Noble	Shijiazhuang Shuanghuan Automobile Co	1.1 litre gasoline	4	2006-	Sold as the Martin Motors Noble/Bubble in Europe.
China	Tiger Truck					small utility truck
Croatia	DOK-ING XD	DOK-ING, Zagreb	45 kW electric motor (x2)	3	2010-	
Czechoslovakia	Aero Minor	Letecke Zavody n.p., Jinonice	Jawa 615 cc	4	1946-1952	Derived from the pre-war Jawa Minor
Czechoslovakia	Avia	Avia, Prague	Jawa 350 cc	3	1956-1958	Avia made about 10 prototype microcars. All gave access via a sliding roof and had a similar seating arrangement to the McLaren F1.
Czechoslovakia	Oskar 54	MOTO-VELO-sport	Jawa 249 cc	2	1945-1956	
Czechoslovakia	Oskar 16/250	VELO, Hradec Králové	Jawa 249 cc	2	1956-1963	
Czechoslovakia	Velorex 16/175	VELO, Hradec Králové	ČZ 171 cc		1963-1971	
Czechoslovakia	Velorex 16/350	VELO, Hradec Králové	Jawa 344 cc	2	1963-1971	
Czechoslovakia	Velorex 435	VELO, Hradec Králové	Jawa 344 cc		1971-1973	
