= Chesil Motor Company =

British automobile manufacturer

Chesil Motor Company (1991–2004) Chesil (2004–2007) Tygan Motor Company (2007–2008) Chesil Motor Company (since 2009)
- Company type: Company
- Industry: Automotive
- Founded: 1991
- Founder: Peter Bailey
- Headquarters: Burton Bradstock, Dorset, United Kingdom
- Website: https://chesil.co.uk/

Chesil Motor Company, previously Chesil and Tygan Motor Company, is a British manufacturer of automobiles. Other sources use the name Chesil Speedsters.

== Company history ==
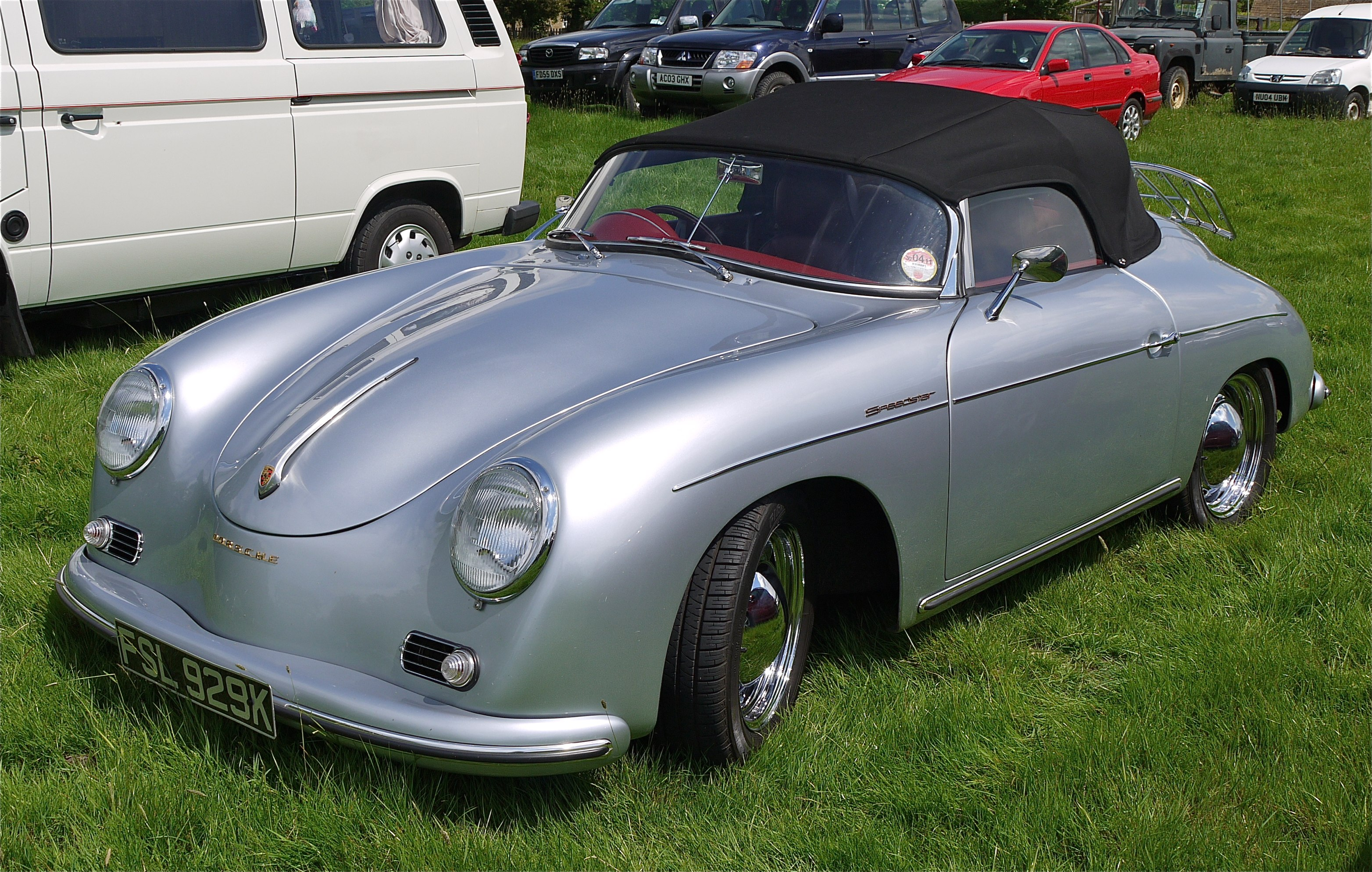
Chesil Speedster

Peter Bailey founded the Chesil Motor Company in Burton Bradstock, Dorset, in 1991. He took over a project from Street Beetle and began producing automobiles and kits. The brand name is Chesil. Angus McCubbin and Jerry Baker ran the successor company Chesil from 2004 to 2007. This was followed by Beaminster- based Tygan Motor Company from 2007 to 2008, run by Graham Lee. Since 2009 the company has been operating again as Chesil Motor Company under the management of Peter Bailey. A total of around 500 vehicles have been built so far.

== Vehicles ==
The first and best-selling model is the Speedster. This is the replica of the Porsche 356 as a speedster. The chassis of the VW Beetle, shortened by 10 ^{3} / _{4} inches, and an additional tubular steel frame form the basis. A body made of glass fibre reinforced plastic is mounted on top. Since 2010, Chesil, in collaboration with Inrekor from the US, has been offering a more modern chassis that can be equipped with more powerful engines.

The RS 60 was on sale between 2005 and 2006 and found two buyers. It was the replica of the Porsche 718.

In addition, imported Spyders from the manufacturer Rudolph Perfect Roadster were offered as 550 Spyders from 1996 to around 2008.

On August 25, 2012, the auction house Silverstone Auctions auctioned off a vehicle from 2003 with the British license plate L4 SLX for £18,984.

In 2019, Westfield Sportscars acquired Chesil Motor Company.

== Literature ==
- Harald H. Linz, Halwart Schrader: Die Internationale Automobil-Enzyklopädie. United Soft Media Verlag, Munich 2008, ISBN 978-3-8032-9876-8, chapter Chesil.
- George Nicholas Georgano (ed.): The Beulieu Encyclopaedia of the Automobile. Volume 1: A-F. Fitzroy Dearborn Publishers, Chicago 2001, ISBN 978-1-57958-293-7, p. 270.
- Steve Hole: A-Z of Kit Cars. The definitive encyclopaedia of the UK's kit-car industry since 1949. Haynes Publishing, Sparkford 2012, ISBN 978-1-84425-677-8, p. 55–56.
