= Westfield XTR2 =

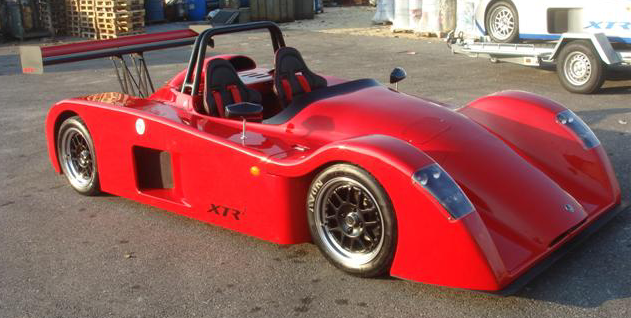

Overview
- Manufacturer: Westfield Sportscars
- Production: 2001–2010

Body and chassis
- Class: Sports car
- Layout: RMR

Powertrain
- Engine: GSXR1300R Suzuki Hayabusa
- Transmission: 6-speed constant mesh sequential

Dimensions
- Wheelbase: 2,413 mm (95.0 in)
- Length: 3,686 mm (145.1 in)
- Width: 1,625 mm (64.0 in)
- Curb weight: From 410 kg (900 lb)

Chronology
- Successor: Westfield XTR4

The Westfield XTR2 is an ultralightweight, two-seater sports car manufactured by Westfield Sportscars Limited, of West Midlands, UK. It features a lightweight steel tubular spaceframe chassis, and the 170 hp (127 kW), 1299 cc Suzuki Hayabusa 4-cylinder engine, mated to a 6-speed sequential gearbox.

It lacks a windshield, side doors, roof, and is virtually devoid of interior luxury. As a result of this simplicity, the car only weighs between 410–440 kilograms, depending on configuration. By achieving an extremely high power-to-weight ratio, it has been intended primarily as a car to be used on the race track. However, it is still legal for road use (at least in the UK). The Westfield XTR2 is a member of the Bike Engined Car (BEC) class of vehicle that are popular at Track Days.

The XTR2 made a notable appearance on the revamped version of BBC's Top Gear, where it outperformed a Pagani Zonda in a timed lap of a test track. The Zonda was the current track time champion. Although the record has since been surpassed by several expensive sports cars, it was a foreshadowing of a future record lap time by the Ariel Atom, another minimalist sports car to which the XTR2 has often been compared.

Westfield ceased production of the XTR2 at the end of 2010 to concentrate on their core "7" product. The Westfield XTR4, which offered an Audi 1.8 DOHC Turbo engine, together with various aesthetic and structural differences to accommodate the car rather than bike engine, ceased production some years before.
