= Westfield XI =

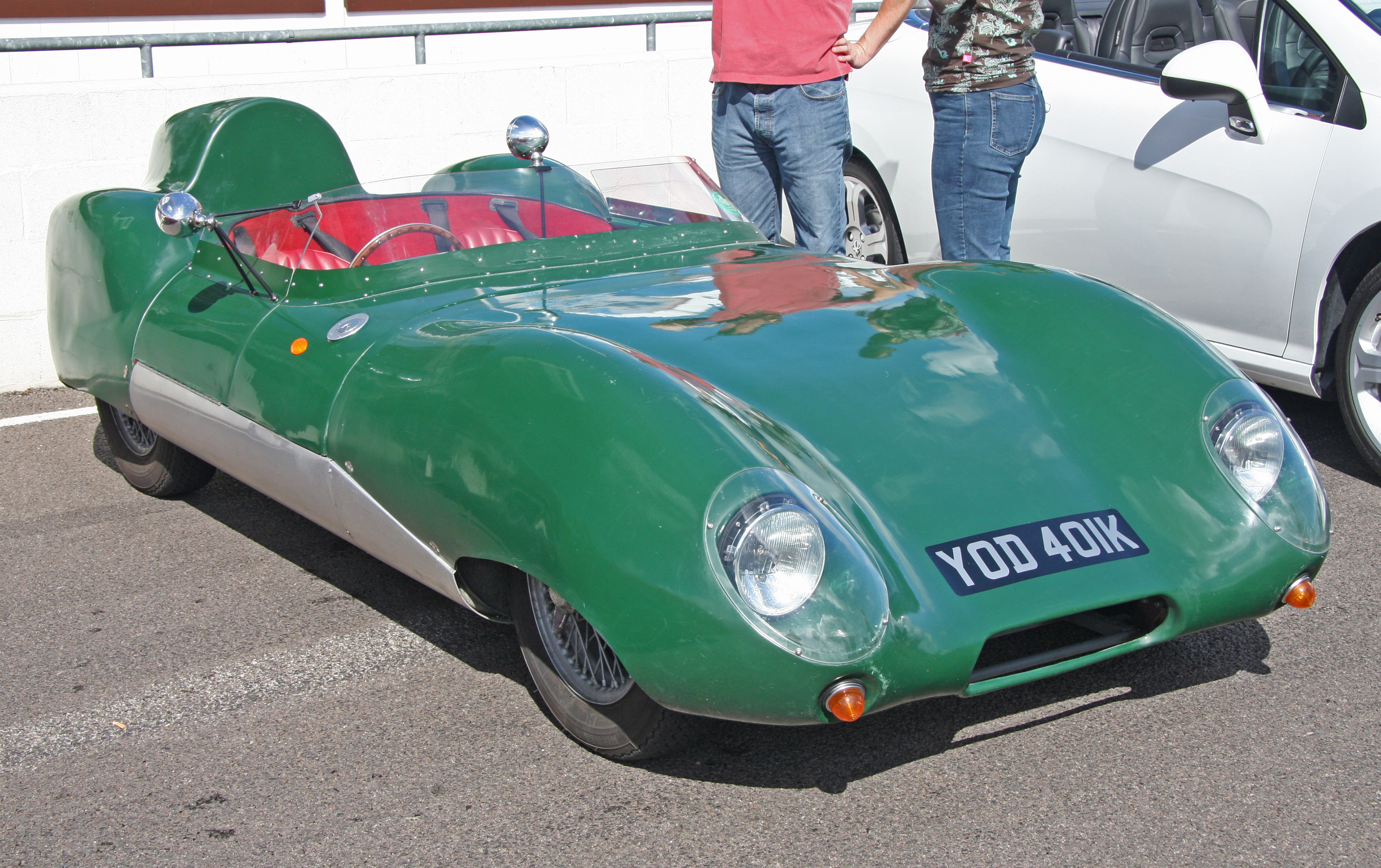

Overview
- Manufacturer: Westfield Sportscars
- Production: 1982 – 2022

Body and chassis
- Class: Sports car
- Layout: FR layout

Powertrain
- Engine: 1,275 cc BMC A-Series engine
- Transmission: 4 or 5-speed manual

Dimensions
- Wheelbase: 2,286 mm (90.0 in)
- Length: 3,657 mm (144.0 in)
- Width: 1,625 mm (64.0 in)
- Height: To top of screen: 863 mm (34.0 in)
- Curb weight: From 530 kg (1,170 lb)

The Westfield XI (or Westfield Eleven) is a British sports car and kit car based on the Lotus Eleven.

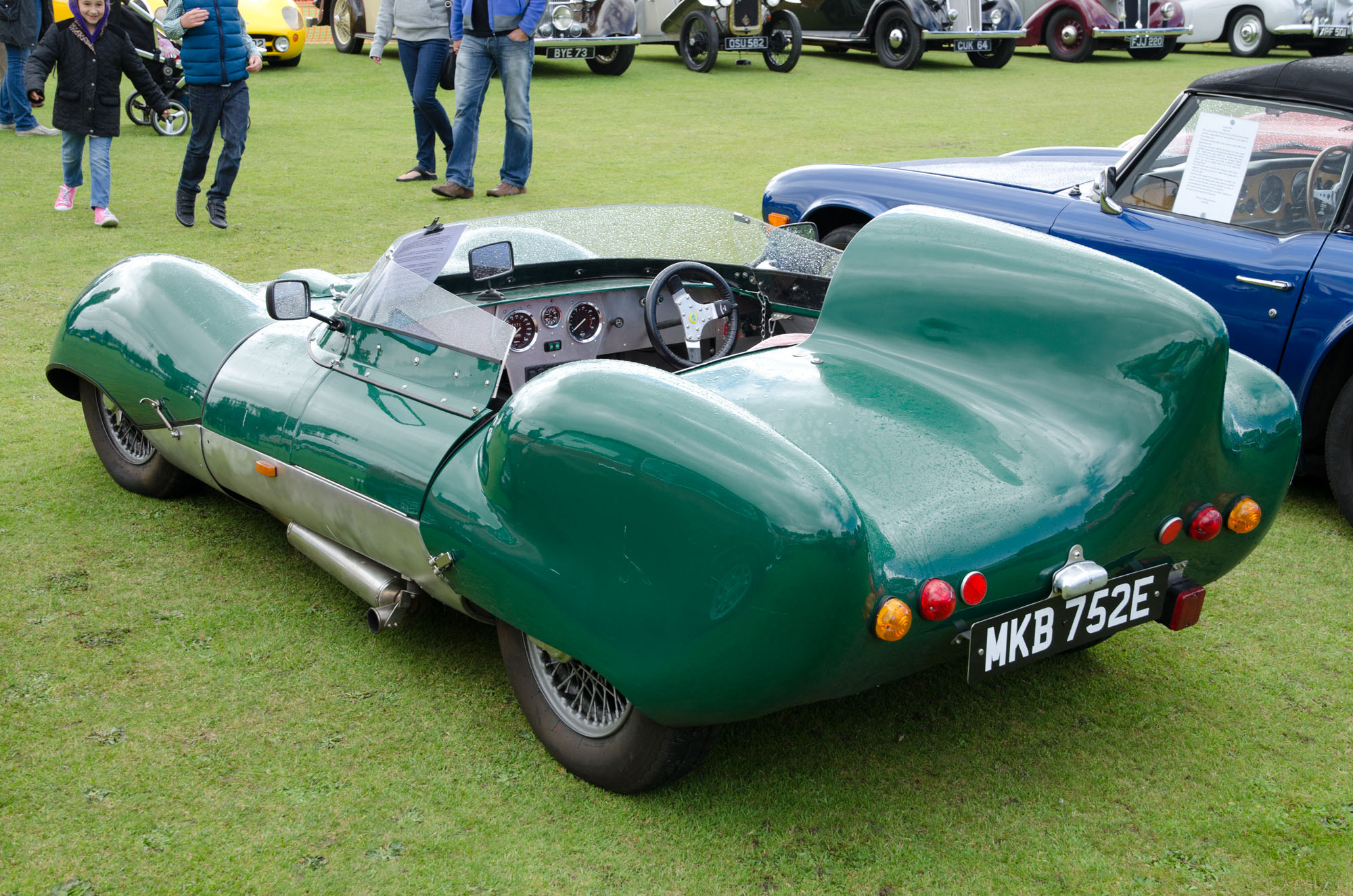
Rear view

In 1982 Westfield Sportscars, responding to the popularity of the original Lotus XI, started production of a replica with a fiberglass body available as either a finished car or kit car. Initially called the Westfield Sports, the factory-finished cars were usually fitted with an uprated 1,275 cc (77.8 cu in) BMC A-Series engine, although some factory cars were fitted with Ford Kents.

The majority of Westfield XIs are sold as self-build kits without engines and designed to accept the 1275cc A-series from a donor MG Midget or Austin-Healey Sprite. Owners have fitted a variety of engines, including Coventry Climaxes, Lotus twin-cams and Alfa Romeo engines, although engine fitment is limited by the small size of the engine bay. The kit is designed to utilise other components from a donor Sprite or Midget: the rear axle (modified by Westfield), gearbox, driveshaft, front upright/brake assembly, radiator, wheels/tyres, steering rack, wiring, and gauges.

In 1983 and 1984, Road & Track featured two articles about the Westfield XI, telling the story of how the magazine's team built a kit car and subsequently took it for a 5,000-mile (8,000 km) cross-country trip from California to Wisconsin. This article raised awareness of the car in the United States and led to more sales.

Production of the original Westfield XI ceased in 1986, although the company offered kits until about 1988. In 2004 Westfield restarted production, still using the A-series engine. Westfield continues to offer the XI kit in small production batches.
