= Westfield SEight =

Westfield SEiGHT
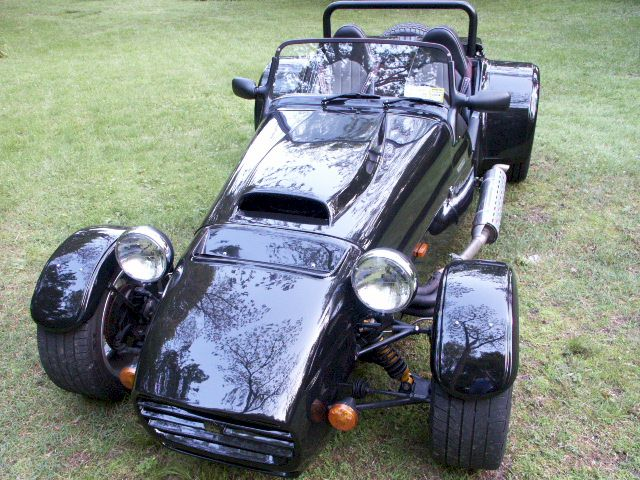

Overview
- Manufacturer: Westfield Sportscars
- Production: 1991-2010

Body and chassis
- Class: Sports car
- Body style: Clubman
- Layout: FR layout

Powertrain
- Engine: Rover V8
- Transmission: Rover SD1, Borg Warner T5, or Rover R380

Dimensions
- Length: 3,340 mm (131 in)
- Width: 1,610 mm (63 in)
- Curb weight: From 657 kg (1,448 lb)

The SeiGHT (pronounced variously as S-8 or 'Sayt') is a sports car manufactured as a kit or factory built vehicle by Westfield Sportscars. It is based on the familiar Lotus Seven concept, created by Colin Chapman, whose design philosophy was to strip a car design down to bare essentials for the ultimate in driving experiences. Bar a few visual differences, such as a bonnet bulge to house the large engine, it uses the same widebody chassis as the smaller engined SEi. All SEiGHTs are defined as such by the powerplant - a V8 engine. In kit form they were initially only available from the factory as a rolling chassis, unlike other Westfield kits which can be bought in component form. Later in their production run Westfield would allow the SEiGHT to be purchased in component form allowing customers to fully experience the build.

Westfield ended production of the SEiGHT in December 2010.

== Powerplant ==
The Rover V8 engine powerplant of the SEiGHT ranges from 3.5 litre units originally sourced from the Rover SD1 to bored and stroked 5.2 litre units. There are also 3.9 fuel injected versions, which are currently provided in the factory built vehicles and TVR Power engines of 4.2 litres. On the whole the V8 is a Rover unit, an alloy block which is lighter than the cast iron blocks of many V8s. One example has been built around an alloy version of the Chevrolet small block with a displacement of 6.6 litres.
