= Westfield Sportscars =

UK business

Westfield Sportscars Ltd
- Type: Manufacturing Company
- Industry: Automobiles
- Founded: 1982
- Fate: Administration
- Headquarters: Bicester, England
- Products: SEi, MegaS2000, Megabusa, SEiGHT, Sport 2000S, XI, XTR2, XTR4 - see Models
- Website: Westfield-sportscars.co.uk

Westfield Sportscars is a manufacturer of both factory built and kit versions of several two-seater, open top sportscars. Their main product is a Lotus Seven- inspired car – a vehicle originally designed by Colin Chapman with only the bare essentials for motoring, to deliver the rawest, most exhilarating driving experience.

== History ==
Whilst Caterham Cars bought the rights from Lotus Cars, Chris Smith set up a rival company and manufactured kits with very similar styling and construction. This led Caterham to threaten litigation (based on Industrial design rights) in the late 1980s which was eventually settled out of court and resulted in Westfield improving and changing the design of their cars. Whilst externally sharing a common look, Westfield and Caterham cars are somewhat different in construction. Westfield prefers to employ the same glass fibre body method that Lotus has traditionally used for their other models such as the Elise, Esprit, and Elan, rather than the aluminium used by Caterham.

Westfield also pioneered technical innovations such as independent rear suspension and a wider chassis, which other manufacturers have since adopted. The company introduced a version of its SEi kit that uses donor parts from the Mazda MX-5, with another kit also sold that used a Ford Sierra as a donor. The wide range of drivetrain configurations available to Westfield customers also included the Honda S2000 engine and gearbox as part of the company's MegaS2000 kit and cars.

According to figures given to the magazine Total Kit Car, Westfield produced about 450 SEi and XTR chassis each year.

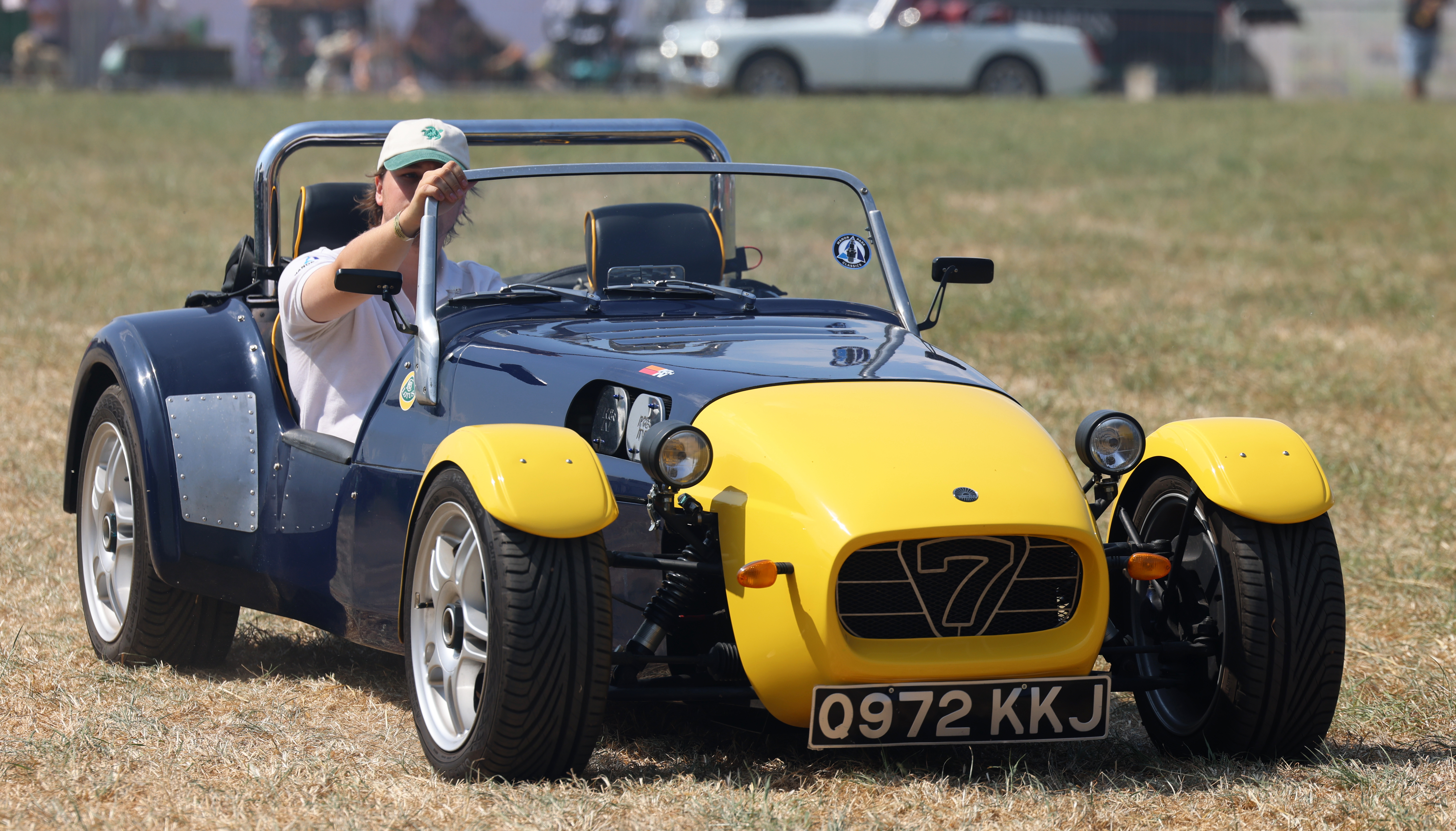
1997 Westfield SE Wide

In the first series of BBC's Top Gear, a Westfield XTR2 driven by the black Stig set a faster lap time than the reigning record holder of that series, the Pagani Zonda.

In December 2006, Westfield became a part of Potenza Sports Cars. In December 2007, it was announced that GTM Cars also became a part of Potenza Sports Cars.

In June 2009 Westfield became the first Niche Vehicle Manufacturer to be awarded European Small Series Production Status with its Sport Turbo model, and has subsequently produced the iRacer – an all-electric racing vehicle, as well as a hybrid vehicle version of the Sport Turbo model.

In 2019, Westfield Sportscars acquired Chesil Motor Company.

In June 2022 Westfield went into administration and ceased trading. In September 2022 Westfield was bought out of insolvency by Westfield Chesil Ltd.. They relocated from Kingswinford to Bicester.

In April 2026, Westfield Chesil Ltd went into administration.

== Models ==
- FW400
- Megabird
- Megabusa
- Megablade
- MegaS2000
- 7SE
- Pre-lit
- SE
- SEi
- SEiW
- SEiGHT
- SDV (Single Donor Vehicle - Ford Sierra or Mazda MX5)
- Sport
- XTR2
- XTR4
- XI
- John
- Speed Sport
- Sport 2000
- Sport 220
- Sport 250

== Racing models ==
- AeroSport
- AeroRace
- iRacer

== Prototypes and concept cars ==
- TRZ
- Topaz

== Gallery ==
Westfield 25th Anniversary Logo

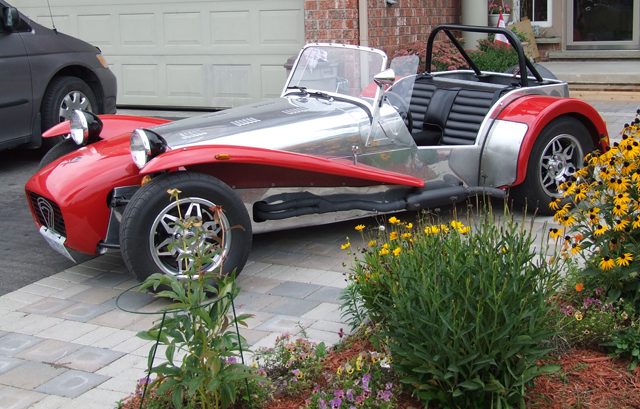
A 'Pre-Lit' (pre-litigation) Westfield Seven

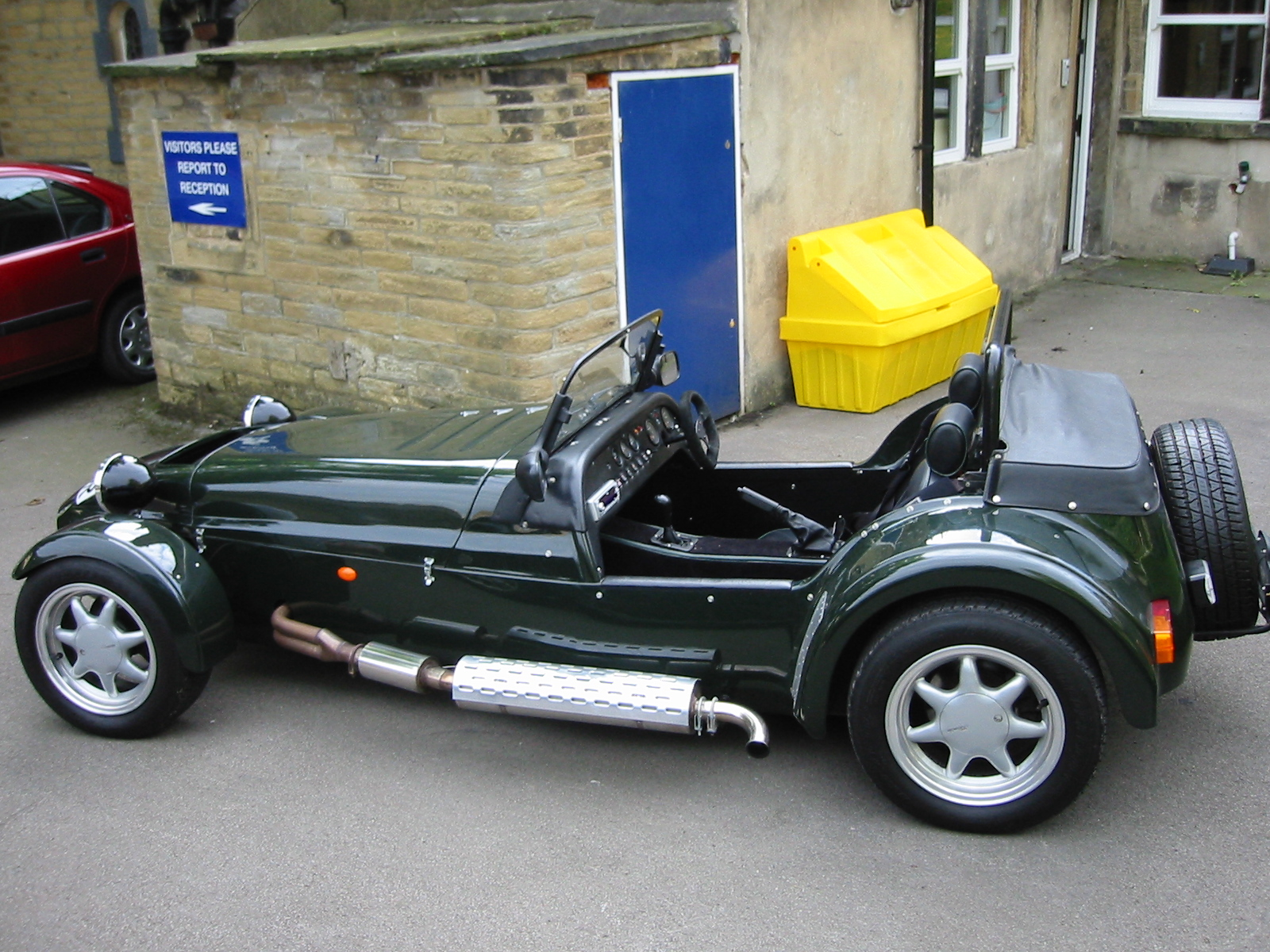
A 1997 Westfield SEi

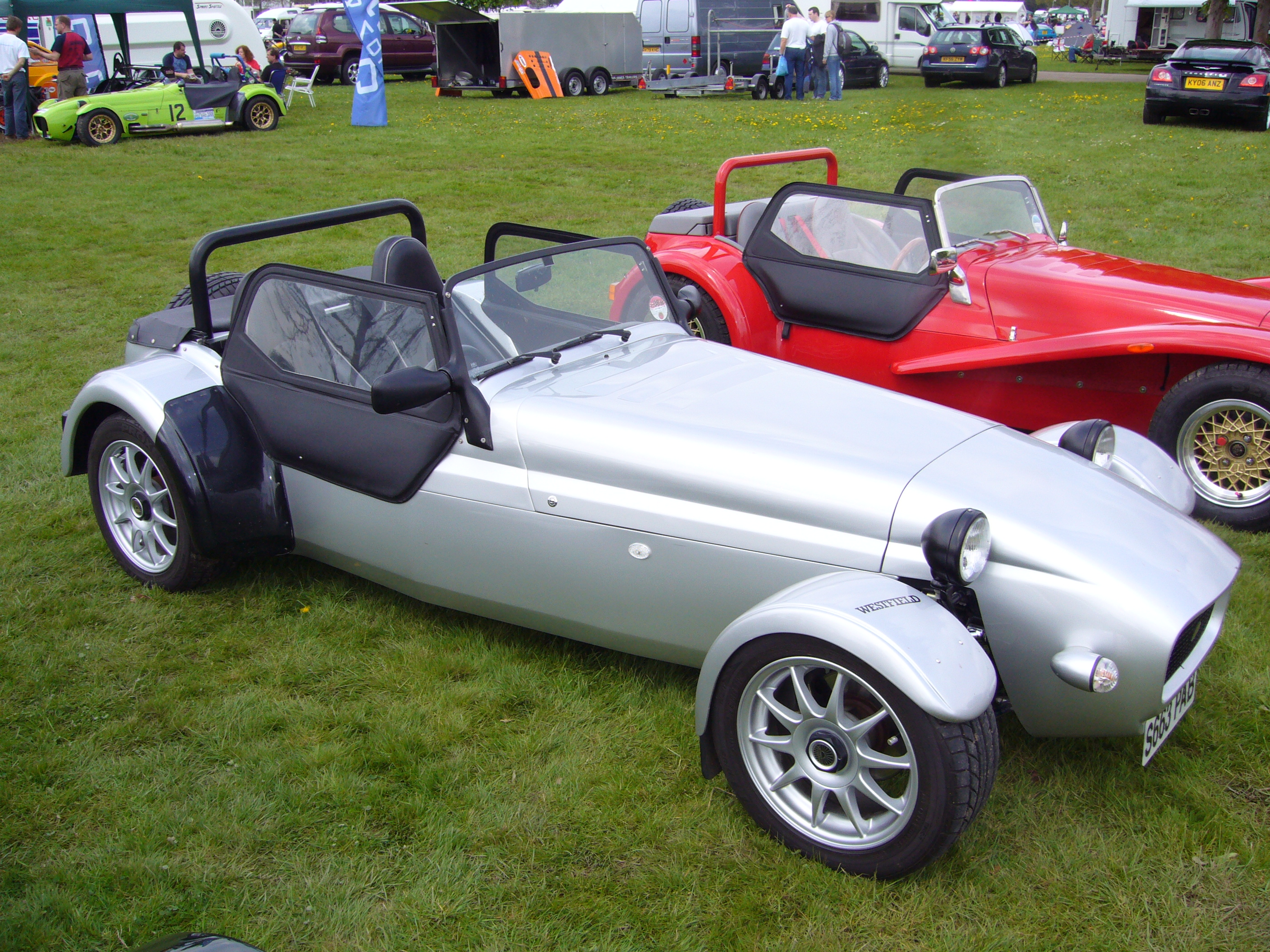
Westfield Sport

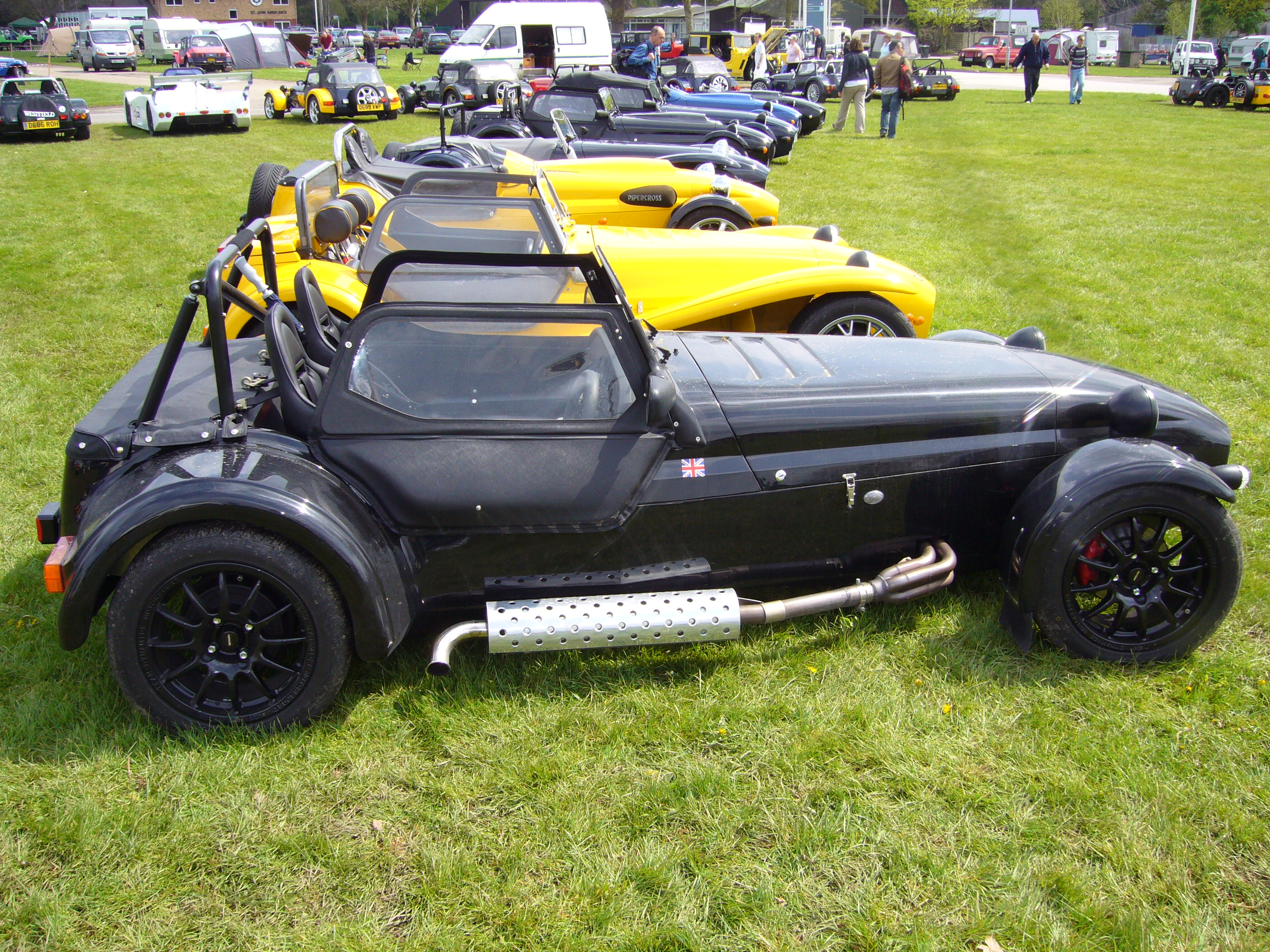
Westfield Sport

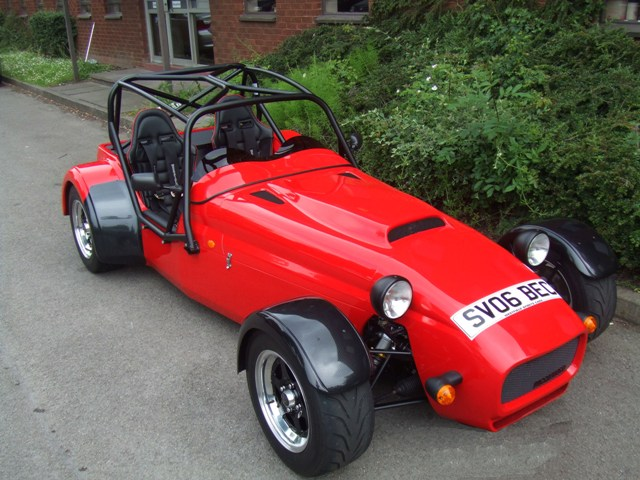
Westfield Megabusa

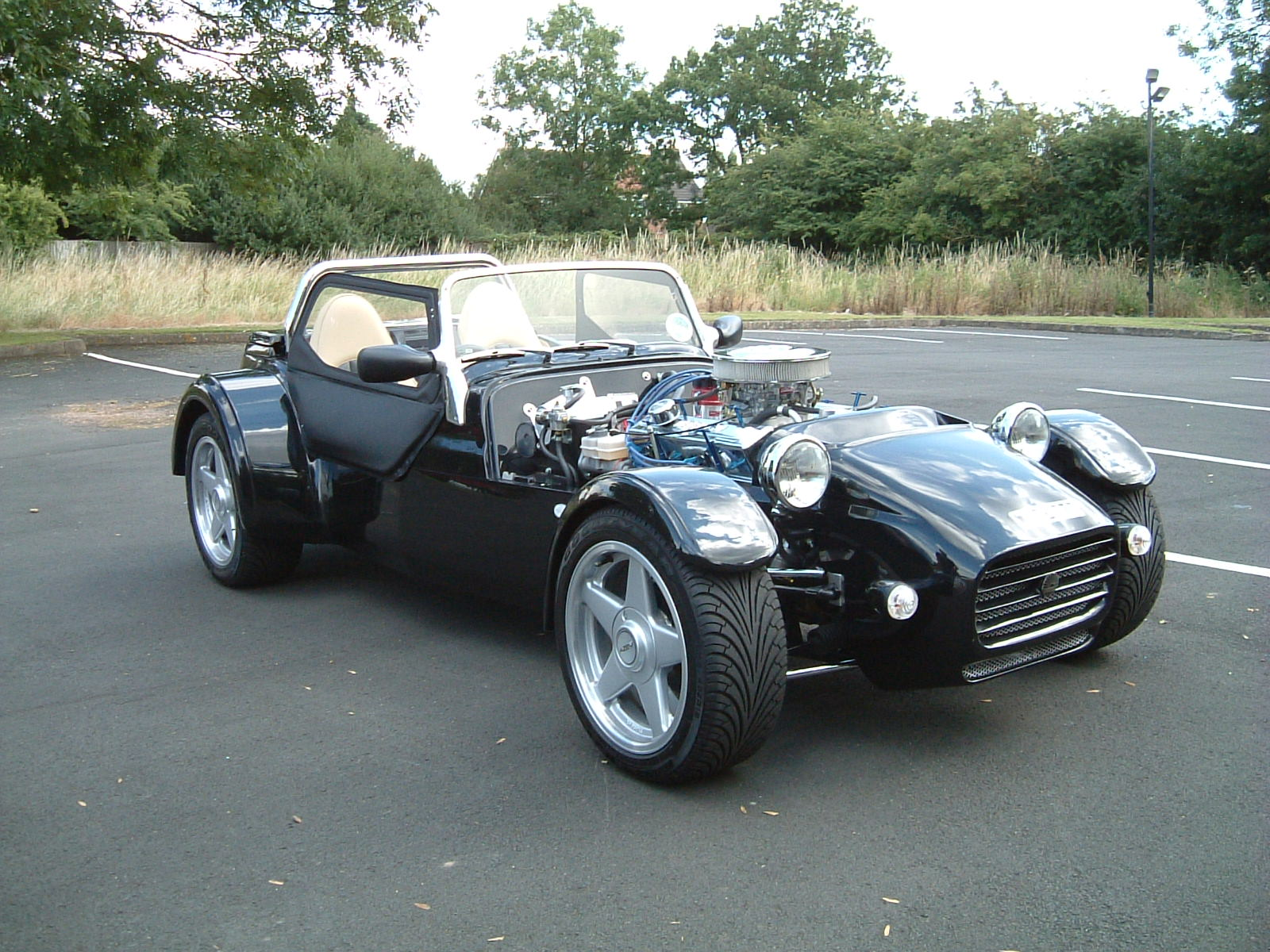
Westfield SEiGHT

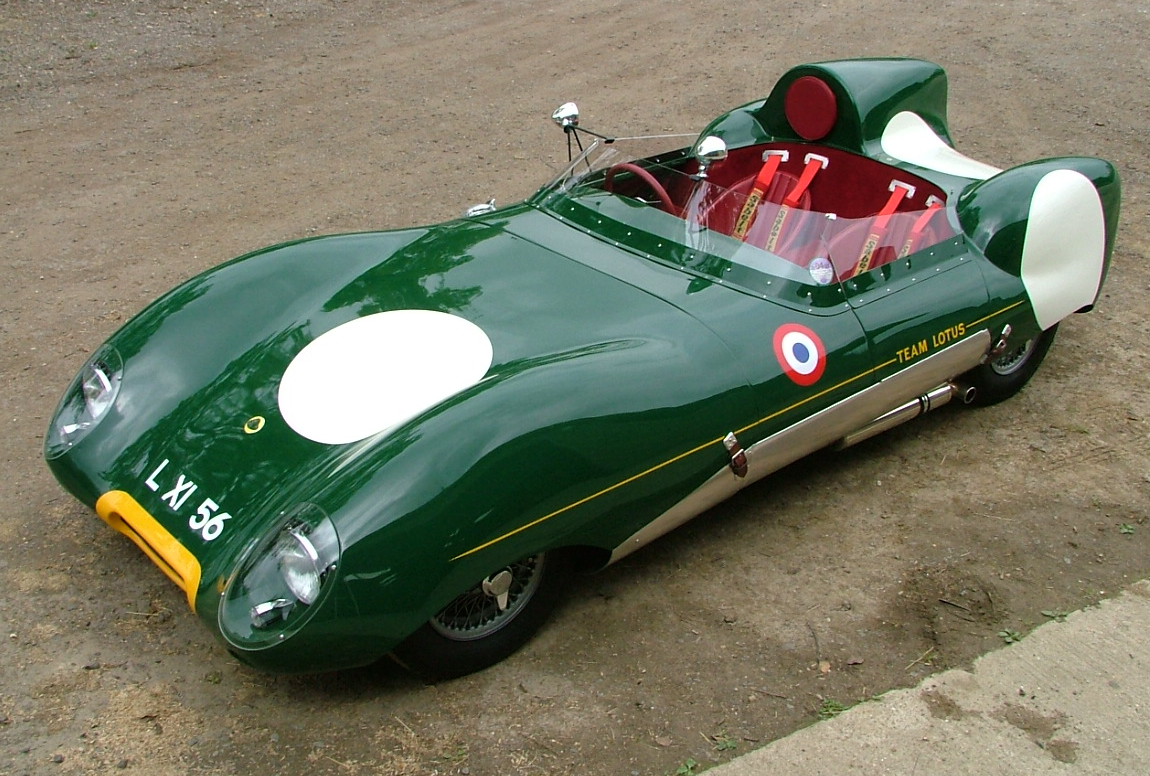
Westfield XI

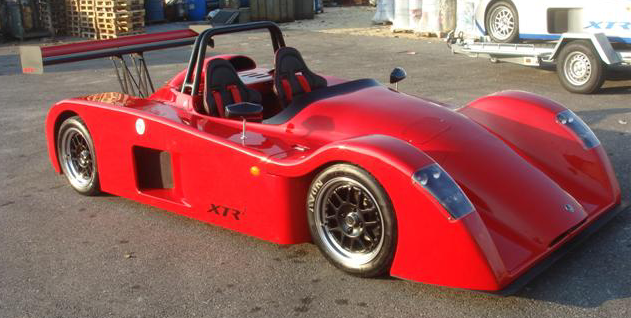
Westfield XTR2

== See also ==
- Lotus Cars
- Caterham Cars
- Chesil Motor Company
- List of car manufacturers of the United Kingdom
