= Westfield Megabusa =

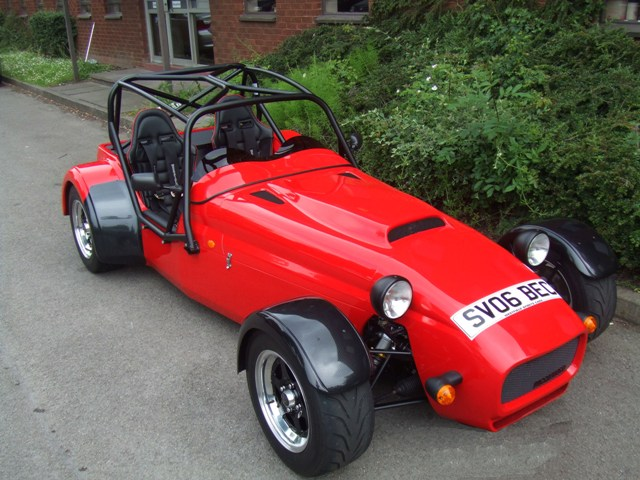

Overview
- Manufacturer: Westfield Sportscars
- Production: 2000 – present

Body and chassis
- Class: Sports car
- Body style: Clubman
- Layout: FR layout

Powertrain
- Engine: 1,300 cc (79.3 cu in) liquid-cooled 4-stroke 16-valve DOHC inline-four 178 bhp (133 kW) @ 9,800 rpm
- Transmission: 6-speed constant-mesh sequential manual

Dimensions
- Length: 3,340 mm (131 in)
- Width: 1,610 mm (63 in)
- Curb weight: From 440 kg (970 lb)

The Westfield Megabusa is a British-made Lotus Seven inspired car with a 1,299 cc motorcycle engine, taken from the Suzuki Hayabusa, and six-speed sequential gearbox. The Megabusa is a road legal track car in some European countries.

== Extras available ==
- Front anti-roll bar
- Oval wide track front wishbones with cantilever inboard anti-roll bar
- Rear anti-roll bar
- Detachable rear arches
- Rear FW body styling
- Quick release steering wheel
- Trimmed racing seats
- RAC specification roll bar
- Full FIA roll cage
- Uprated suspension made by Nitron Racing Shocks
- Four point 3" race harnesses
- Limited slip differential
- Full electrically heated screen
- Weather tonneau cover
- Full trim interior
- Epoxy coated aluminium panels
