= Tourette (automobile) =

Overview
- Manufacturer: Progress Supreme Co Ltd.
- Production: 1956–1958 (26 produced)

Body and chassis
- Class: Microcar
- Body style: Roadster

Powertrain
- Engine: 197 cc

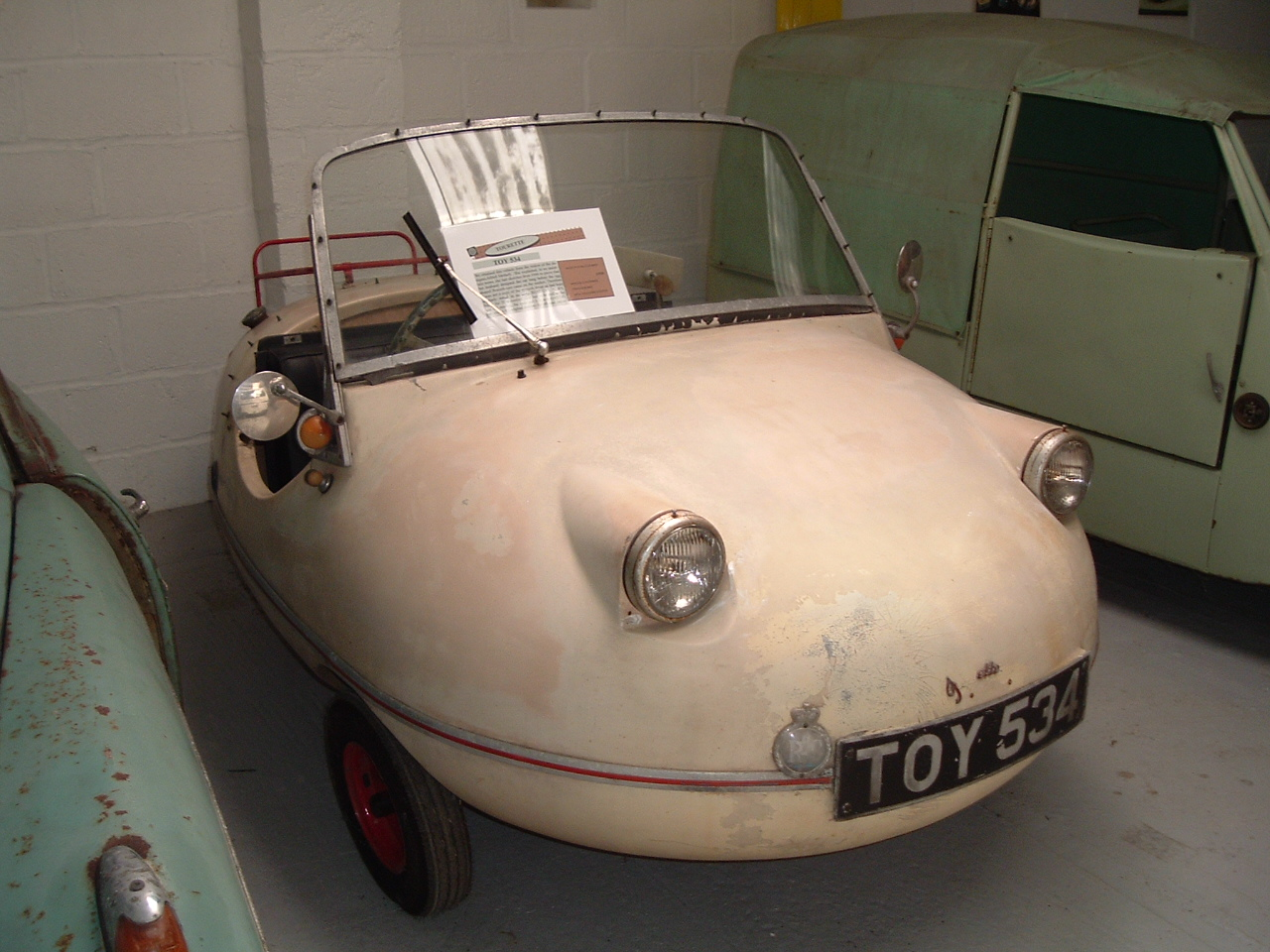

The Tourette was a microcar by Carr Brothers (later Progress Supreme Co Ltd) of Purley, London, England between 1956 and 1958.

It had a three-wheeled, rounded body that was available either in alloy on an ash frame, or in fibreglass. The car was powered by a two-stroke 197 cc Villiers engine driving through a four-speed gearbox with optional Dynastart reverse. Top speed was claimed to be 55 mph (89 km/h). The single rear wheel was mounted in a pivotal fork. Front-wheel movement was controlled by hydraulically damped spring units. Final drive was by chain. A single bench seat provided accommodation for two adults and a child with some luggage space behind the seat.

Approximate weight, fully equipped, was 500 lb (230 kg). Fuel tank capacity was 2.25 imperial gallons (10.2 L; 2.7 US gal).

In 1958, the purchase price (including purchase tax), was £386 10s 5d (£386.52). Only 26 are believed to have been produced.

== See also ==
- List of car manufacturers of the United Kingdom
