= Velorex =

Manufacturing association in Czechoslovakia

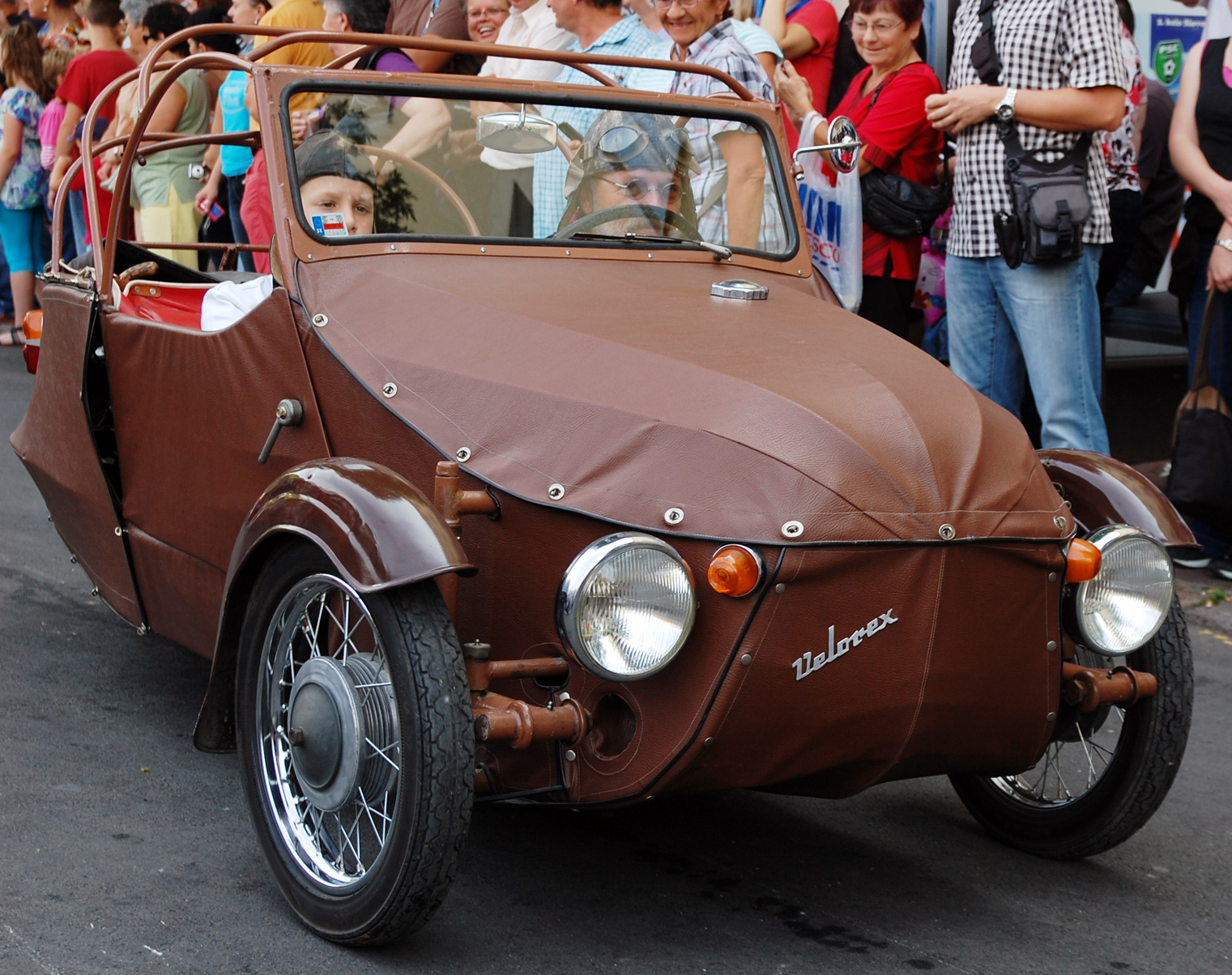
Velorex

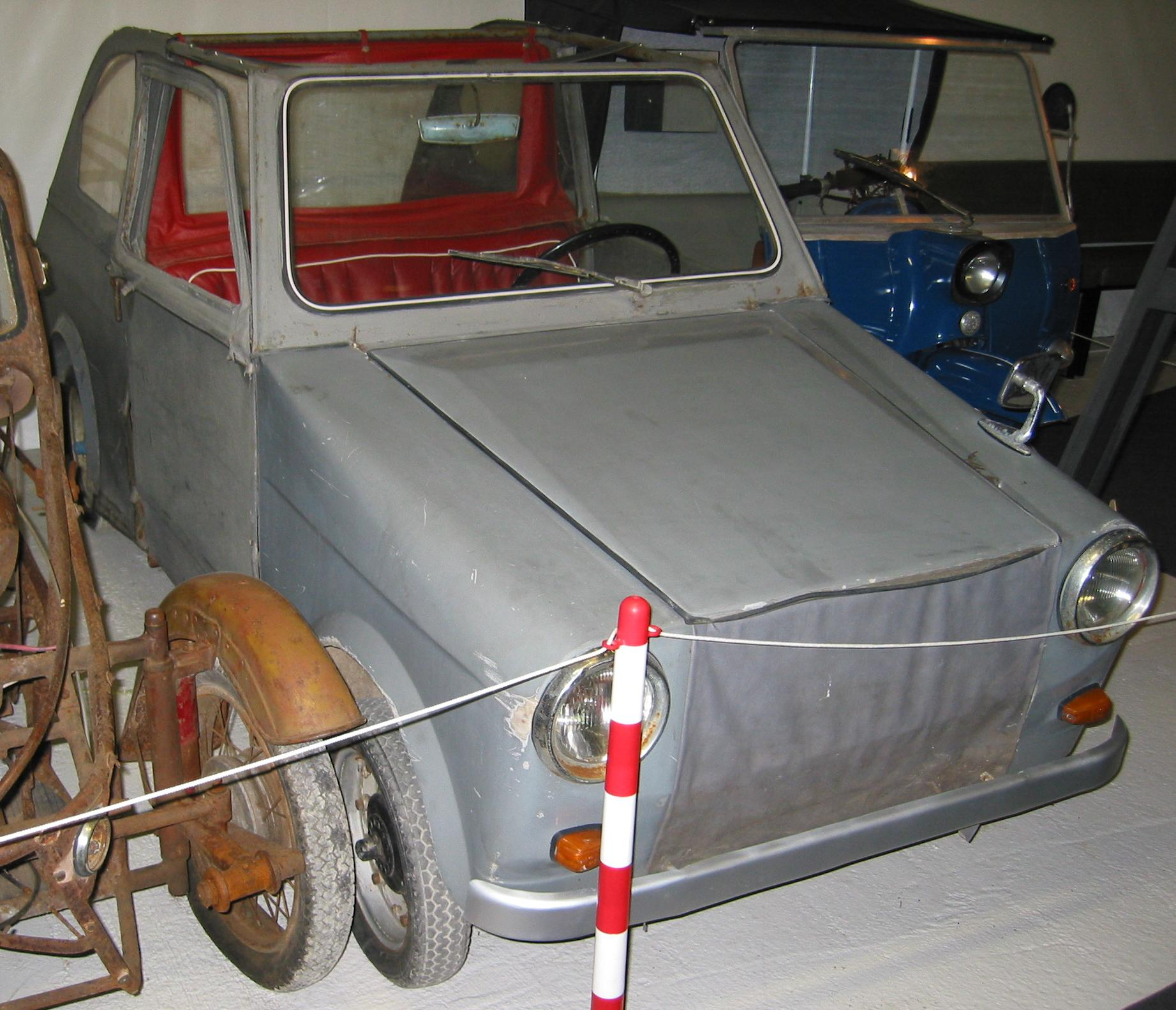
Velorex 453-0

Velorex on video

Velorex was a manufacturing cooperative in Solnice, Czechoslovakia. Notable products included a small three-wheeled car, produced from the 1950s until 1971, and the Type 562 sidecar. The sidecar is still manufactured in the Czech Republic by Velorexport, the successor to Velorex.

== History ==
Beginning in 1936, two brothers František (1914–1954) and Mojmír (1924–2011) Stránský, the owners of a bicycle repair shop in the market town of Parník (today part of Česká Třebová), began the design of a small, cheap three-wheeled car, inspired by three-wheelers from Morgan Motor Company. In 1943, they built their first prototype using steel tubing wrapped by dural sheet metal and some bicycle parts (later these would be replaced by parts from motorcycles). They named the vehicle Oskar ("kára na ose," or "cart on axle").

In 1945, the brothers built their first batch of cars, using leather cloth instead of sheet metal as the bodywork. Three vehicles were powered by 150 cc (9 cu in) ČZ motorcycle engines, three with 6 bhp (4 kW; 6 PS), 300 cc (18 cu in) PAL engines and six with 250 cc (15 cu in) Jawa units. The price was about a quarter of the cost of a typical car.

The post-war Czechoslovak auto industry was unable to meet popular demand for vehicles, resulting in long waiting periods and quotas. Several models of small cars had been built either by amateurs or in small runs (e.g., Kreibich, TRIGA Tripolino, JAB).

In 1950, the Stránský's workshop was transferred to Velo, a small manufacturing company in Hradec Králové, later renamed to Velorex. In 1951, the machinery and six workers were moved into a new plant in Solnice. During that year, 120 Oskar 54 vehicles were produced; a year later, 180; and in 1954, eighty workers produced 40 vehicles per month. On January 21, 1954, František Stránský died when a test prototype crashed. His brother, Mojmír, refused membership in the Communist Party of Czechoslovakia and was fired. In 1956, the vehicle's name was changed to Velorex - Oskar and then just to Velorex. In 1959 the company produced 120 vehicles per month. In 1961 part of the production moved into a new plant in Rychnov nad Kněžnou. The maximum speed of the car was 30 km/h.

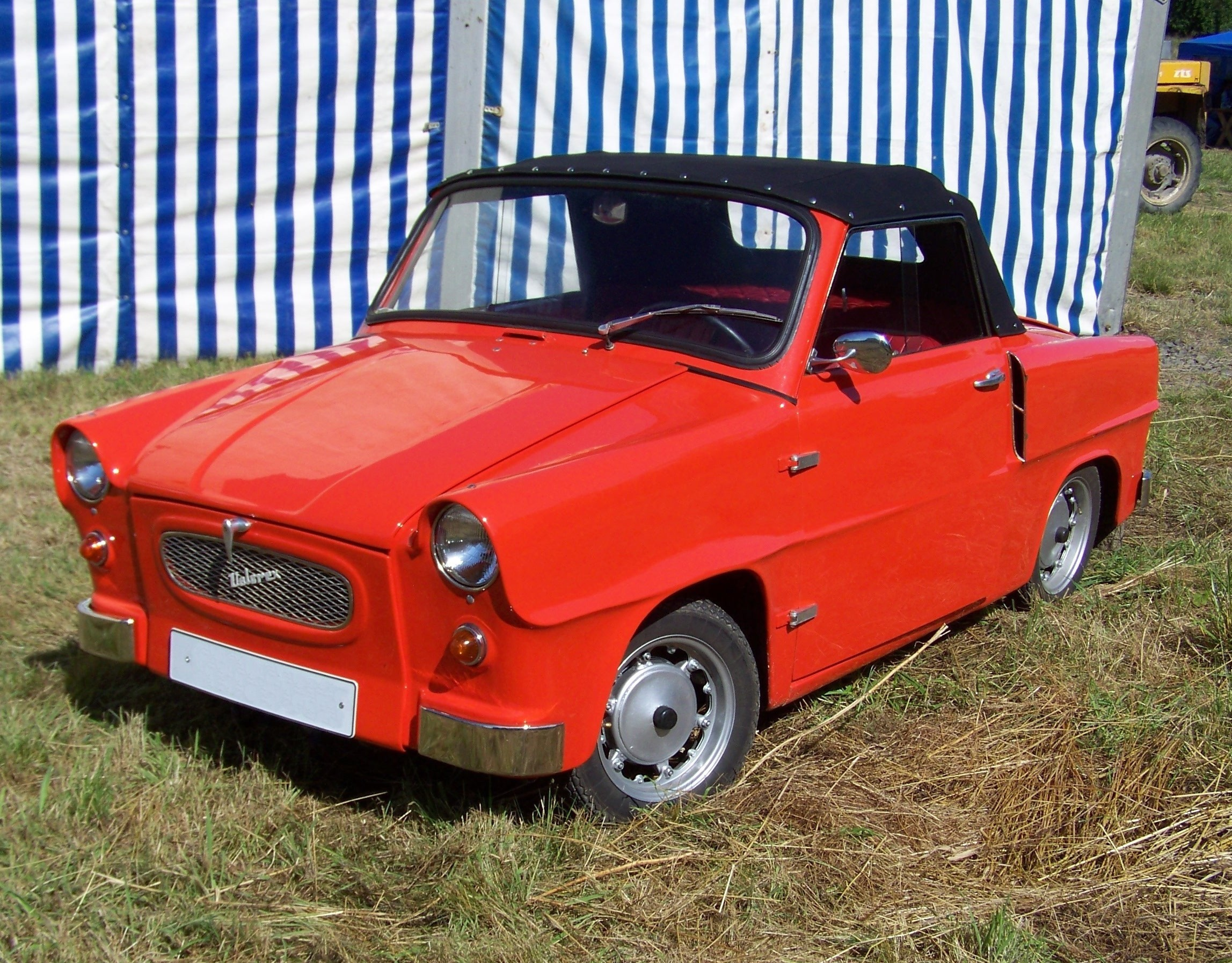
Four-wheeled Velorex convertible

In 1963, production of the newly designed "Model 16" started (fitted with either ČZ 175 or Jawa 350 type 572 engines); and the model was modernized again in 1968. In 1971, production of three-wheeled cars stopped, and the company switched to production of a four-wheeler, the "Model 435-0", which featured the Jawa 350 type 572 - 04 engine. Problems in design and manufacturing, as well as the inability to compete with higher-category cars (including the cheap Trabants), made the four-wheeler a commercial failure, and its production was stopped in 1973. Plans to produce a small car similar to Fiat 500 or a rickshaw-like truck did not materialize.

Spare parts for Velorex vehicles were first produced in the Solnice plant, and then in Rychnov nad Kněžnou after 1975. In the mid-1980s, India tried to obtain a license to produce the three-wheelers; the deal failed because the original tooling no longer existed.

== Statistics ==
Production figures
Model	Total
Oskar 54, Velorex Oskar, Velorex 16/250	2,500
Velorex 16/175	800
Velorex 16/350	12,000
four-wheeler 435-0	1,380

About half of the production was exported to Eastern Bloc countries (Hungary, Poland, Bulgaria, East Germany) - 7,540 vehicles in total. In Czechoslovakia, the demand exceeded the supply and the new cars were sold only to the disabled after thorough examination by an official commission. Part of the production was allocated to companies and organizations.

As of 1996, 62.5% of the three-wheelers sold in Czechoslovakia were still registered. As of 2006 the vehicle can be still seen occasionally and it has obtained cult-like status among its owners. Several Velorex clubs exist in the Czech Republic. Rallies are regularly organized in Boskovice (last in 2007) and in Lipnice nad Sázavou, inside the Lipnice Castle. Until 2000 only the motorcycle driving license (A) was required, afterwards the B1 driver's license (car from age of 17).

== Technical parameters ==
Velorex was built on a frame of welded steel tubing, with bodywork consisting of vinyl (called "Igelit") stretched over the cage and attached by turnbutton fasteners. Like most of other three-wheeler types Velorex had two wheels in the front and one wheel at the back.

=== Oskar 54 ===
- designed as a special car for the disabled,
- two seats,
- motorcycle engine Jawa 250, two-stroked, one cylinder, forced air cooling, 248.5 cm³, 9 HP with 4,250 rpm,
- fuel consumption: 3.6 L/100 km,
- weight: 205 kg unloaded, max 395 kg,
- length 3.1 m, width 1.4 m, height 1.25 m.

=== Oskar 16/250 ===
- designed as a special car for the disabled,
- two seats,
- motorcycle engine Jawa 250, two-stroked, one cylinder, forced air cooling, 248.5 cm³, 9 HP (later 12 HP) with 4,250 rpm,
- fuel consumption: 3.6 L/100 km,
- weight: 205 kg unloaded, max 395 kg,
- length 3.25 m, width 1.38 m, height 1.25 m.
- tyres with smaller dimension than Oskar 54

=== Velorex 16/175 ===
- designed as a special car for the disabled,
- two seats,
- motorcycle engine ČZ 175 - 505, two-stroked, one cylinder, forced air cooling, 171,8 cm³, 8.5 HP with 4,500 rpm,
- fuel consumption: 5 L/100 km,
- weight: 290 kg unloaded, max 490 kg,
- length 3.1 m, width 1.4 m, height 1.24 m.

=== Velorex 16/350 ===
- designed as a special car for the disabled,
- two seats,
- motorcycle engine Jawa 350 - 572, two-stroked, two cylinders, forced air cooling, 344 cm³, 11.8 kW (16 HP) with 4,750 rpm.
- cruising speed 60 km/h (max 85 km/h),
- weight: 310 kg unloaded, max 500 kg,
- length 3.1 m, width 1.4 m, height 1.24 m.

=== Velorex 435-0 ===
- four-wheeler
- engine Jawa 350/572, forced air cooling, 17 HP with 4,750 rpm,
- weight: 385 kg unloaded, max 585 kg,
- fuel consumption: 6.5 L/100 km,
- max speed 80 km/h,
- length 2.89 m, width 1.15 m, height 1.365 m.

== Velorex sidecars ==
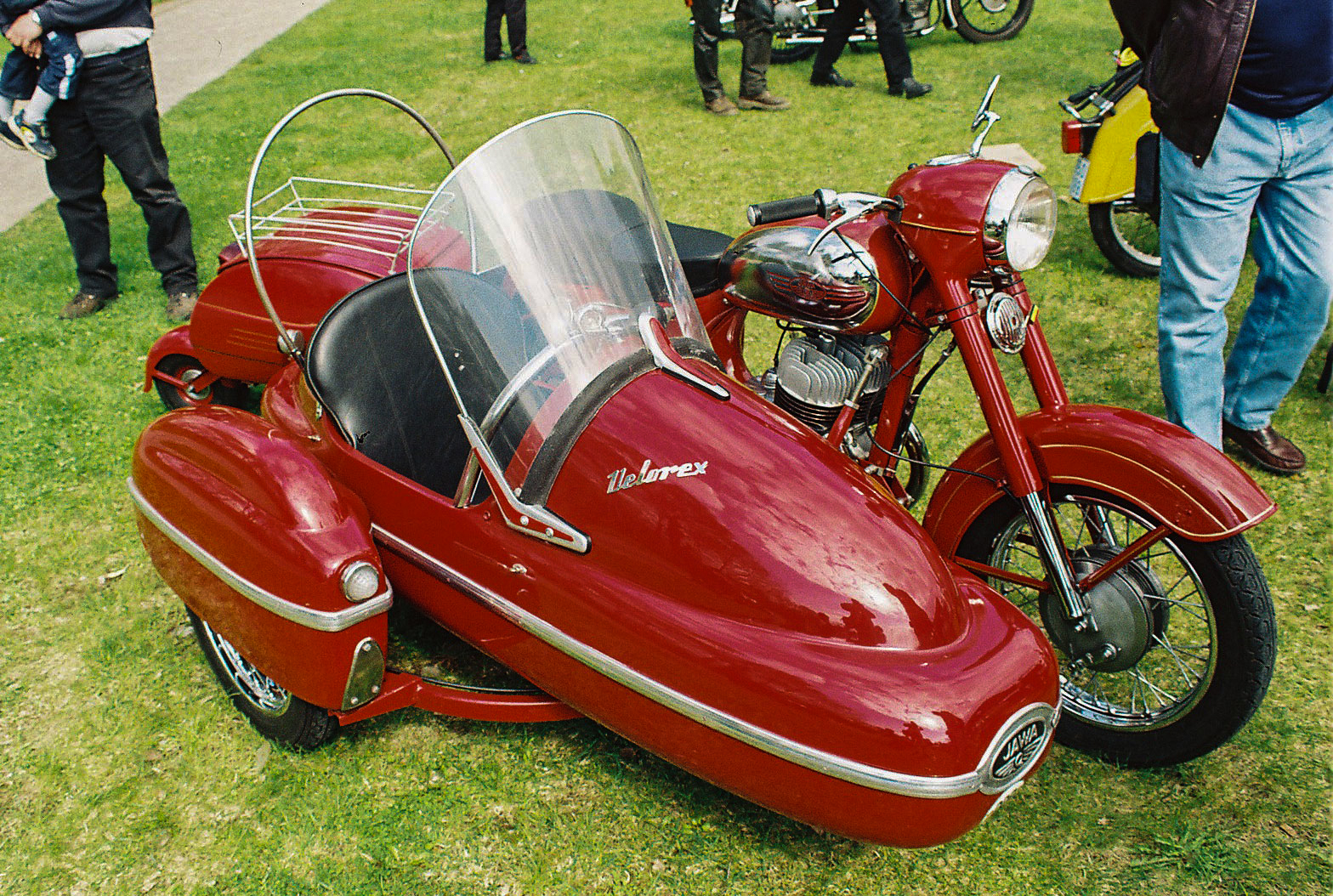
Jawa 350 motorcycle with Velorex sidecar

Demand for motorcycle and sidecar combinations in the Soviet Union brought a requirement for Jawa to build a motorcycle capable of pulling a sidecar and Velorex to build a sidecar for it. In response, Jawa built their 354 motorcycle with enough strength and power for sidecar use, and Velorex built the Type 560 sidecar.

In 1974, Jawa built the 350cc Type 634 motorcycle, which was designed even more specifically for use in a sidecar combination in the Soviet Union. The Jawa Type 634 produced 28 BHP @ 5,252 RPM and an impressive 38 Foot / Pounds of Torque @ 3,800 RPM, equal to the original 750cc Triumph Boneville. The electrics were powered by a 6 Volt 75 Watt dynamo as opposed to the Jawa Type 354's 6 Volt 45 Watt dynamo system. In response, Velorex created the Type 562 sidecar, which was stronger than the Type 560, but was also simpler to assemble, thereby improving the production rate which had been a problem in manufacturing the Type 560. Velorex manufactured approximately 290,000 Type 562 sidecars from 1974 to the late 1990s.

In 1986 Jawa replaced the Type 634 motorcycle with the more powerful 350cc Type 638 motorcycle, which originally produced 34 BHP @ 6,500 RPM and 30 Foot / Pounds of torque @ 3,800 RPM, which was also available with the Velorex 562 sidecar attached.

The Type 638 was detuned, from 1988 onwards, to 25 BHP @ 5,252 RPM for European Union emissions considerations. For the Dutch market it was detuned further to 23 BHP @ 5,252 RPM to cater for Holland's unique emissions requirements at that time.

In 1990 Jawa reintroduced the Type 634 engine, now featuring a 12 Volt 228 Watt Magneton alternator, in the Type 638 motorcycle chassis as the Type 632. This proved to be a better sidecar machine than the now detuned Type 638 motorcycle.

In 1990 Velorex produced the Type 710 sidecar and this was marketed with the Type 632 motorcycle attached.

The Type 638 with a disc front brake and Velorex Type 710 sidecar attached was also marketed alongside the Type 632 combination as the Type 639 from 1990.

Jawa motorcycles built for sidecar use, as opposed to solo motorcycle use, feature smaller 15 or 16 tooth gearbox sprockets (18 teeth on solo bikes), an attachment on the rear brake cable pivot arm for the sidecar's own brake cable to attach, a left footrest with an attachment for the sidecar brake cable to fit into and modified wiring loom at the rear of the bike with electrical power coupling for the sidecar's lighting and accessories.

An adjustable friction type steering damper was fitted under the headstock on some machines, though this later proved to be unnecessary due to the good handling characteristics of the unit as a whole. This feature was occasionally fitted to the Type 634, Type 638, Type 632, Type 639 and Type 640 machines from 1974 to date.

The Velorex Type 710 featured a more streamlined shape, resembling a jet fighter cockpit with a large forward opening perspex windshield, plus an interior space with plenty of leg room. Stowage behind the now full height backrested seat was 3 times the capacity of the Type 562 sidecar. Because of this the Type 710 was and still is regarded as the best sidecar Velorex ever produced.

Both the Type 562 and Type 710 sidecars share the same chassis, with only the bodywork being different. Both feature either a 16 Inch or 18 Inch wheel with a 160mm. diameter single leading shoe drum brake, which is linked, when fitted to a Jawa motorcycle, to the rear brake mechanism to provide balanced braking.

Both the Velorex Type 562 and Type 710 sidecars were marketed separately worldwide with fitting kits for various foreign motorcycle types including Harley-Davidson, Honda, Triumph, etc.

Currently Jawa still sells the 350cc Type 640 combination with the Velorex Type 562 sidecar in Europe and the United Kingdom, this currently being the only large 2 stroke motorcycle to meet current European Union emission regulations.

The cooperative collapsed shortly after the Velvet Revolution, but the sidecar production facilities have since been privatized and sidecar production has restarted under the Velorexport name.

== "New Velorex" ==
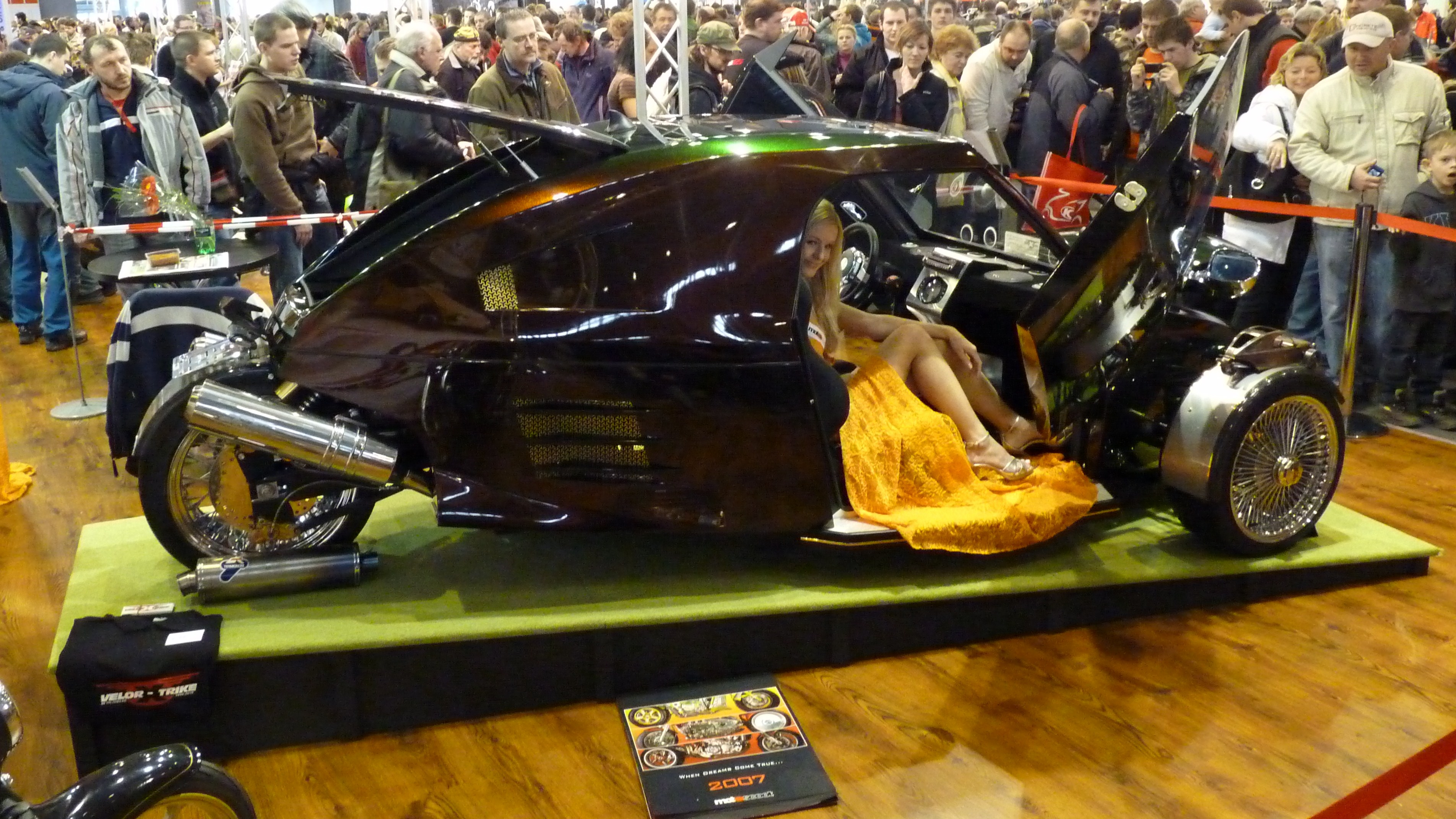
Velor-X-Trike

Motoscoot, a motorcycle reseller from the Czech Republic, plans to produce modern three-wheeled sports car named "Velor-X-Trike" (initially "New Velorex"). The design was made public in March 2010 and the company expects to assemble about 5–10 vehicles per year.

The Velor-X-Trike model has nothing to do with the recent designs by Mojmír Stránský, author of the original Velorex.

== See also ==
- List of microcars by country of origin
- Microcar

== Literature ==
- Ivo Fajman: Velorex: historie, vývoj, technika, současnost (Velorex: history, design, technology, present time), Grada, 2010, ISBN 978-80-247-3274-9. The book was prepared, since 2006, by a group of Velorex enthusiasts. Among others it contains catalog of preserved cars.
