= 1958 SCCA National Sports Car Championship =

Seasons
- ← 1957 1959 →

The 1958 SCCA National Sports Car Championship season was the eighth season of the Sports Car Club of America's National Sports Car Championship. It began January 12, 1958, and ended October 5, 1958, after sixteen races.

== Classes ==
Class	Modified	Production
B	5000-8000cc	3500-5000cc
C	3000-5000cc	2700-3500cc
D	2000-3000cc	2000-2700cc
E	1500-2000cc	1600-2000cc
F	1100-1500cc	1300-1600cc
G	750-1100cc	1000-1300cc
H	500-750cc	750-1000cc
I	350-500cc	500-750cc
J	under 350cc	350-500cc
K	-	under 350cc

== Schedule ==
Rnd	Race	Length^{A}	Circuit	Location	Date
1	Orange Bowl National Championship Sports Car Races	100 mi (160 km)	Master Field	Miami, Florida	January 12
2	President's Cup	80 mi (130 km)	Marlboro Motor Raceway	Upper Marlboro, Maryland	April 20
3	National Championship Spring Sprint Sports Car Road Races	1 hour	Virginia International Raceway	Danville, Virginia	May 4
4	Cumberland National Championship Sports Car Races	1 hour	Greater Cumberland Regional Airport	Wiley Ford, West Virginia	May 19
5	SCCA National Races	75 mi (121 km)	Bridgehampton Race Circuit	Bridgehampton, New York	June 1
6	Lime Rock National Sports Car Races	100 km (62 mi)	Lime Rock Park	Lakeville, Connecticut	June 15
7	International June Sprints	150 mi (240 km)	Road America	Elkhart Lake, Wisconsin	June 22
8	Lime Rock National Championship Races	100 km (62 mi)	Lime Rock Park	Lakeville, Connecticut	July 5
9	SCCA National Races	70 mi (110 km)	Milwaukee State Fair Park	West Allis, Wisconsin	August 16
10	SCCA National Races	150 km (93 mi)	Montgomery Airport	Montgomery, New York	August 17
11	Thompson National Championship Races	60 mi (97 km)	Thompson International Speedway	Thompson, Connecticut	September 1
12	Road America 500	500 mi (800 km)	Road America	Elkhart Lake, Wisconsin	September 7
13	Watkins Glen Grand Prix	100 mi (160 km)	Watkins Glen International	Watkins Glen, New York	September 20
14	SCCA National Races	1 hour	Vaca Valley Raceway	Vacaville, California	October 5
15	Autumn Festival Sports Car Races	150 km (93 mi)	Virginia International Raceway	Danville, Virginia	October 5
16	Palm Springs Exhibition Sports Car Races	50 mi (80 km)	Palm Springs Municipal Airport	Palm Springs, California	November 2

^A Feature race

== Season results ==
Feature race overall winners in bold.

Rnd	Circuit	BM Winning Team	BP Winning Team	CM Winning Team	CP Winning Team	DM Winning Team	DP Winning Team	EM Winning Team	EP Winning Team	FM Winning Team	FP Winning Team	GM Winning Team	GP Winning Team	HM Winning Team	HP Winning Team	KM Winning Team	Results
Rnd	Circuit	BM Winning Driver(s)	BP Winning Driver(s)	CM Winning Driver(s)	CP Winning Driver(s)	DM Winning Driver(s)	DP Winning Driver(s)	EM Winning Driver(s)	EP Winning Driver(s)	FM Winning Driver(s)	FP Winning Driver(s)	GM Winning Driver(s)	GP Winning Driver(s)	HM Winning Driver(s)	HP Winning Driver(s)	KM Winning Driver(s)	Results
1	Miami^{A}	#92 Ferrari	#14 Chevrolet	**#60 Briggs Cunningham**	#621 Jaguar	#115 Ferrari	#188 Austin-Healey	#25 Ferrari	#55 A.C.-Bristol	#0 Porsche	#83 Porsche	#37 Lotus	#130 Alfa Romeo	#77 Bandini-Saab	no entries	no entries	Results
1	Miami^{A}	(United States) George Reed	(United States) Rees Makins	**(United States) Walt Hansgen**	(United States) Don Smith	(United States) James Johnston	(United States) Fred Moore	(Switzerland) Gaston Andrey	(United States) Duncan Forlong	(United States) Charles Wallace	(United States) John Cuevas	(United States) Roy Schechter	(United States) Art Tweedale	(United States) George Parsons	no entries	no entries	Results
2	Marlboro	A.C.-Jaguar	Chevrolet	**#60 Briggs Cunningham**	Jaguar	Maserati	Austin-Healey	Ferrari	A.C.-Bristol	Porsche	Porsche; MG	Elva	Alfa Romeo	Bandini-Saab	D.B.-Panhard	no entries	Results
2	Marlboro	(United States) Chuck Sarle	(United States) Fred Windridge	**(United States) Walt Hansgen**	(United States) John Hayes	(United States) Bark Henry	(United States) Fred Moore	(Switzerland) Gaston Andrey	(United States) Ed Welch	(United States) Bob Holbert	(United States) Emil Pupulidy (Porsche) (United States) Ben Fowke (MG)^{B}	(United States) Frank Baptista	(United States) Bob Grossman	(United States) George Parsons	(United States) Richard Toland	no entries	Results
3	VIR^{B}	#16 Lance Reventlow	Chevrolet	**#60 Briggs Cunningham**	#97 Ferrari	no finishers	#26 Austin-Healey	#50 Ferrari	#20 A.C.-Bristol	#74 Porsche	#33 Porsche	#35 Elva	#179 Alfa Romeo	#160 Osca	#7 D.B.-Panhard	no entries	Results
3	VIR^{B}	(United States) Lance Reventlow	(United States) Fred Windridge	**(United States) Walt Hansgen**	(United States) George Arents	no finishers	(United States) Reed Rollo	(Switzerland) Gaston Andrey	(United States) Ross Wees	(United States) Don Sesslar	(United States) Emil Pupulidy	(United States) Frank Baptista	(United States) Tony Briggs	(United States) Robert Ferguson	(United States) Howard Hanna	no entries	Results
4	Cumberland	no finishers	Chevrolet	**#60 Briggs Cunningham**	Ferrari	no finishers	#17 David L. Herson	#7 J.V. Quackenbush	A.C.-Bristol	#74 Cyrus L. Fulton	#33 Emil Pupulidy	#35 Continental Motors, Ltd.	#82 Barry Budlong, Jr.	#127 James P. Eichenlaub	#1 Richard H.R. Toland	no entries	Results
4	Cumberland	no finishers	(United States) Fred Windridge	**(United States) Walt Hansgen**	(United States) George Arents	no finishers	(United States) Dick Thompson	(United States) John Quackenbush	(United States) Ross Mees	(United States) Don Sesslar	(United States) Emil Pupulidy	(United States) Frank Baptista	(United States) Barry Budlong	(United States) James Eichenlaub	(United States) Richard Toland	no entries	Results
5	Bridgehampton	no finishers	Cheetah	**#60 Briggs Cunningham**	Ferrari	Aston Martin	Austin-Healey	Ferrari	A.C.-Bristol	Porsche	Porsche	unknown	Alfa Romeo	unknown	no entries	no entries	Results
5	Bridgehampton	no finishers	(United States) John Plaisted	**(United States) Walt Hansgen**	(United States) George Arents	(United States) Fred Windridge	(United States) Dick Thompson	(Switzerland) Gaston Andrey	(United States) Harry Carter	(United States) Bob Holbert	(United States) Emil Pupulidy	unknown	(United States) Bob Grossman	unknown	no entries	no entries	Results
6	Lime Rock	no entries	#99 Chevrolet	**#60 Briggs Cunningham**	#98 Ferrari	#76 Aston Martin	#11 Austin-Healey	#8 Maserati	#80 A.C.-Bristol	#140 Porsche	#33 Porsche	#35 Lotus	#71 Alfa Romeo	#74 PBX	^{D}	no entries	Results
6	Lime Rock	no entries	(United States) Fred Windridge	**(United States) Walt Hansgen**	(United States) George Arents	(United States) Alan Markelson	(United States) Dick Thompson	(United States) John Fitch	(United States) Harry Carter	(United States) Bob Holbert	(United States) Emil Pupulidy	(United States) Frank Baptista	(United States) John Clapp	(United States) Candy Poole	^{D}	no entries	Results
7	Road America	#91 J. M. Lyeth, Jr.	#14 L. Lindheimer	**#60 Briggs Cunningham**	unknown	#21 C.J. Hughes	unknown	unknown	unknown	unknown	unknown	unknown	unknown	unknown	no entries	no entries	Results
7	Road America	(United States) Richard Lyeth	(United States) Jim Jeffords	**(United States) Walt Hansgen**	unknown	(United States) Dan Collins	unknown	unknown	unknown	unknown	unknown	unknown	unknown	unknown	no entries	no entries	Results
8	Lime Rock	no entries	#99 Chevrolet	**#61 Briggs Cunningham**	#98 Ferrari	^{E}	#17 Austin-Healey	#8 Maserati	#180 A.C.-Bristol	#140 Porsche	#33 Porsche	#16 Lotus	#32 Alfa Romeo	#174 PBX	^{F}	no entries	Results
8	Lime Rock	no entries	(United States) Fred Windridge	**(United States) Ed Crawford**	(United States) George Arents	^{E}	(United States) Dick Thompson	(United States) John Fitch	(United States) Harry Carter	(United States) Bob Holbert	(United States) Emil Pupulidy	(United States) Floyd Aaskov	(United States) Ray Anderson	(United States) Candy Poole	^{F}	no entries	Results
9	Milwaukee	no finishers	#1 Chevrolet	#10 Ferrari	#96 Ferrari	**#7 Pabst Motors**	#66 Austin-Healey	#27 Porsche	#21 A.C.-Bristol	#44 Porsche	#0 Porsche	#214 Lotus Cars	#8 Alfa Romeo	#53 Martin T	no entries	no entries	Results
9	Milwaukee	no finishers	(United States) Jim Jeffords	(United States) John Kilborn	(United States) George Reed	**(United States) Augie Pabst**	(United States) Ralph Durbin	(United States) Ernie Erickson	(United States) Luke Stear	(United States) Dean Causey	(United States) Chuck Rickert	(United States) John C. Kilburn	(United States) Kaser	(United States) Martin Tanner	no entries	no entries	Results
10	Montgomery	**#15 Reventlow Automobiles**	#1 Chevrolet	#60 Briggs Cunningham	#80 Jaguar	no finishers	#11 Austin-Healey	#46 Ed Hugus	#246 A.C.-Bristol	#140 Porsche	#33 Porsche	#2 Lotus-Climax	#170 Alfa Romeo	#38 Danielini Special	#171 D.B.-Panhard	no entries	Results
10	Montgomery	**(United States) Chuck Daigh**	(United States) Jim Jeffords	(United States) Walt Hansgen	(United States) Harry Carter	no finishers	(United States) Dick Thompson	(United States) Ed Hugus	(United States) Jordan King	(United States) Bob Holbert	(United States) Emil Pupulidy	(United States) Floyd Aaskov	(United States) John Guthrie	(United States) Joe Daniels	(United States) Howard Hanna	no entries	Results
11	Thompson	**Reventlow Automobiles**	unknown	#60 Briggs Cunningham	Jaguar	unknown	unknown	unknown	A.C.-Bristol	Porsche	unknown	unknown	unknown	unknown	unknown	unknown	Results
11	Thompson	**(United States) Lance Reventlow**	unknown	(United States) Walt Hansgen	(United States) Harry Bristol	unknown	unknown	unknown	(United States) Harry Bristol	(United States) Bob Holbert	unknown	unknown	unknown	unknown	unknown	unknown	Results
12	Road America	#45 Excalibur	#2 Chevrolet	**#25 North American Racing Team**	#96 Ferrari	#15 James R. Johnston	#66 Austin-Healey	#13 Ferrari	#7 A.C.-Bristol	#42 Porsche	#0 Porsche	#35 Elva	#2 Alfa Romeo	#53 Martin T	no entries	no entries	Results
12	Road America	(United States) Hal Ullrich (United States) Carl Haas	(United States) Jim Jeffords	**(Switzerland) Gaston Andrey** **(United States) Lance Reventlow**	(United States) George Reed	(United States) James Johnston (United States) Bud Seaverns	(United States) Ralph Durbin	(United States) James Place (United States) Ken Neill	(United States) Luke Stear	(United States) Dean Causey (United States) Chuck Rickert	(United States) Chuck Rickert	(United States) Frank Baptista	(United States) Ted Baumgartner	(United States) Martin Tanner	no entries	no entries	Results
13	Watkins Glen	no finishers	#1 John F. Stephani	**#61 Briggs Cunningham**	#80 Harry E. Carter	no entries	#11 David Herson	#45 A. H. Burrough	#27 Arch M. Means	#140 Bob Holbert	#71 Harry C. Blanchard	#67 Louis C. Bartol	#47 Alfa Romeo	#121 John Milos	#29 D.B.	#134 Berkeley	Results
13	Watkins Glen	no finishers	(United States) Jim Jeffords	**(United States) Ed Crawford**	(United States) Harry Carter	no entries	(United States) Dick Thompson	(United States) Gilbert Geitner	(United States) Arch M. Means	(United States) Bob Holbert	(United States) Harry Blanchard	(United States) Floyd Aaskov	(United States) Chuck Stoddard	(United States) John Milos	(United States) Richard Toland	(United States) Sam Moses	Results
14	Vaca Valley	no finishers	#5 Chevrolet	**#11 John von Neumann**	#47 Jaguar	Ferrari	#1 Mercedes-Benz	#88 Porsche	#117 A.C.-Bristol	#12 Porsche	#44 Porsche	#37 Lotus	#148 Alfa Romeo	#79 D.B.	no finishers	no entries	Results
14	Vaca Valley	no finishers	(United States) Jim Jeffords	**(United States) John von Neumann**	(United States) Cliff Wright	(United States) Josie von Neumann	(United States) Ray Rairdon	(United States) Jack McAfee	(United States) Chick Leson	(United States) Eldon Beagle	(United States) John Barneson	(United States) Stan Peterson	(United States) Steve Froines	(United States) Bill Wood	no finishers	no entries	Results
15	VIR	#91 Ferrari-Chevrolet	#69 Chevrolet	**#60 Briggs Cunningham**	#190 Jaguar	no entries	#73 Austin-Healey	#25 Ferrari	#19 A.C.-Bristol	#74 Porsche	#123 MG	#14 Lotus	#90 Alfa Romeo	#121 Osca	no entries	no entries	Results
15	VIR	(United States) Richard Lyeth	(United States) Frank Dominianni	**(United States) Walt Hansgen**	(United States) Bob Grossman	no entries	(United States) Fred Moore	(Switzerland) Gaston Andrey	(United States) Arch Means	(United States) Don Sesslar	(United States) Murray Clark	(United States) Floyd Aaskov	(United States) Bob Grossman	(United States) Ed Ginther	no entries	no entries	Results
16	Palm Springs	no finishers	Chevrolet	Ferrari	Mercedes-Benz	#146 Ferrari	Austin-Healey	no entries	Porsche	**Porsche**	Porsche	Lotus	Alfa Romeo	Little Digger-Crosley	Austin-Healey	Berkeley	Results
16	Palm Springs	no finishers	(United States) Fred Grant	(United States) Jim Connor	(United States) Pete Caulkin	(United States) Dick Morgensen	(United States) Jack Rowe	no entries	(United States) D. D. Michelmore	**(United States) Jack McAfee**	(United States) Richard Bellows	(United States) Chuck Schroeder	(United States) Bythiner	(United States) Bill Beck	(United States) Bill Louden	(United States) Jerry Beem	Results

^A A K Production class was also held, won by George Metzger in a Berkeley.
^B A K Production class was also held, won by William Harding in a Berkeley-Excelsior.
^C Separate Porsche and MG winners were declared in F Production at Marlboro.
^D H Production were classified with G Production at Lime Rock (June).
^E D Modified were classified with C Modified at Lime Rock (July).
^F H Production were classified with G Production at Lime Rock (July).

== Champions ==
Class	Driver	Car
B Modified	(United States) Hal Ullrich	Excalibur
B Production	(United States) Jim Jeffords	Chevrolet Corvette
C Modified	(United States) Walt Hansgen	Jaguar D-type, Lister-Jaguar
C Production	(United States) George Reed	Ferrari 250 GT
D Modified	(United States) James Johnston	Ferrari 250 TR
D Production	(United States) Dick Thompson	Austin-Healey 100-Six
E Modified	(Switzerland) Gaston Andrey	Ferrari 500 TRC Spyder
E Production	(United States) Harry Carter	AC Ace-Bristol
F Modified	(United States) Bob Holbert	Porsche 550 RS
F Production	(United States) Emil Pupulidy	Porsche 356 Carrera
G Modified	(United States) Frank Baptista	Elva Mk II, Lotus Eleven, Elva Mk III
G Production	(United States) Bob Grossman	Alfa Romeo Giulietta Veloce
H Modified	(United States) Martin Tanner	"Martin T" Special
H Production	(United States) Howard Hanna	D.B.-Panhard
K Modified	(United States) Sam Moses	Berkeley Excelsior
