= Liège-Brescia-Liège =

Motorsport event in Europe

Liège-Brescia-Liège is a motorsports rallying event organised once in 1958 and recreated as a historic rally in 2008 and subsequently.

== Historical context ==
The 1958 event was the only international rally of that era to be organised exclusively for cars with engines under 500cc. Races for small-engined cars were common at the time, but capacity limits for rallying were only used to differentiate classes: all other rallies, such as the Monte Carlo Rally, Tulip Rally, Alpine Rally and the Liège–Rome–Liège Rally were open to cars of all engine capacities. Liège-Brescia-Liège, therefore, represents a unique, pioneering attempt to use rallying to promote economical, "green" transport. Following the Suez crisis of 1956 and consequent petrol shortages and rationing across Europe, many manufacturers and small volume car constructors brought out tiny vehicles offering transport for two to four people with very low fuel consumption. Some were primitive in the extreme, but others were surprisingly sophisticated.

== Organisers ==
The Royal Motor Union of Liège, Belgium, organisers of the Liège-Rome-Liège Rally (and later the Liège-Sofia-Liège and other events), under its Commissaire-Général Maurice Garot, decided to create a rally specifically for these tiny cars, to test them and find out which, if any, were capable of transporting two people at a reliable speed over all types of road conditions. Garot's rallies were famous as the toughest rallies for all cars at the time, using the hardest roads of the Alps and Dolomites mountain ranges with tight time schedules. Officially it was not permitted to run an event at an average speed greater than 50 km/hour, so that was the speed stated in the Regulations. However, competitors of the time recall that if you drove at that speed, you would find yourself arriving at the next time control after it had closed. You drove to the times that the controls were open, which often required an average speed over the maximum. The times for the Liège-Brescia-Liège rally were most likely more relaxed and it may have kept to the 50 km/hour requirement, (except on the German autobahns and in Yugoslavia, where it was permitted to run the event at 60 km/hour) but that was still a difficult speed to average in such tiny-engined cars over the challenging route, which included more than 20 mountain passes, including Vrsic in Slovenia and Europe's two highest road passes, Passo Stelvio and Passo di Gavia in the Italian Dolomites.

== Non-stop event ==
To make the event even tougher for the tiny cars and their drivers, it was run almost non-stop. The cars left Liège at 17.30 on Thursday, July 17, 1958, and drove in convoy to Spa. There they lined up to start from 21.00 that evening. They would not rest until Saturday morning, when they were due to arrive in Brescia, Italy (having driven 1970 km via Ljubljana in Slovenia) at 09.50. The cars went into parc ferme and could not be touched for eight hours. From 18.00, the cars left the Piazza Loggia in Brescia to drive back over the Gavia and Stelvio, through Austria, up the German autobahn and back to arrive at Spa, a claimed total distance of 3203 km, at 16.47 on Sunday.

== Results ==
From the 29 cars that started the event – six British Berkeleys, seven Italian Fiat 500s, German-built four Zündapps, two BMW Isettas, a Lloyd and a Messerschmitt TG500, French-built two Citroën 2CVs, one Panhard and two UMAPs and one Belgian-built Isard – just 13 were left – all seven Fiat 500s and all four Zündapp 250s, plus the Lloyd and one UMAP. The event proved which cars were the most durable vehicles of their type. The winners were Arturo Brunetto from Italy and Alfredo Frieder from Argentina in a Fiat 500 Sport.

== Event revival ==
In July 2008, ClassicRallyPress Ltd created a historic rally following as closely as possible the 1958 route, except for the sections on German autobahns which were changed due to the danger of running tiny cars at 60 km/h on unlimited-speed autobahns. Unlike 1958, the event was spread over 10 days, covering approx 200 miles per day and, while it was still competitive, every effort was made to help competitors keep their cars running and in the event. 54 cars left Liège from 07.30 on Friday, July 11, 2008, and 50 drove across the finish line back in Liège on the afternoon of Sunday, July 20 – 50 years to the day after the pioneering first event. Winners of the Authentic category for cars of a type that could have competed in the original event were Patrick Pellen, Ronald Hagelen and Els van Beek from the Netherlands in a Vespa 400 (intriguingly, a type of car that had been entered in the 1958 event but was not ready in time for the start). The Spirit category for slightly later cars up to 700cc was won by Alastair Caldwell and Tanya Annett in a BMW 700.

The event took place again in July 2010 for cars up to 1200cc, maintaining its aim to promote rallying for small, economical cars, and was won by a 1936 Morgan F4 3-wheeler crewed by Hedwig and Nicole Rodyns and a 1962 Mini-Cooper driven by Ben and Mike Norton. In July 2011, the rally was run for cars up to 1500cc. The Authentic category for cars of a type built in or before 1958 was won by Andrew Murfin and Willy Cave in a 1949 MG TD; the Spirit category was won by Andrew Isherwood and Hilary Farbowski in a 1966 Mini 1293. In July 2012, in a change from the traditional small-engined cars, but maintaining the rally's tradition of catering for a specific motoring sector from the 1950s and just after, the rally was run for Jaguar XKs (Authentic Category) and E-types (Spirit Category). Winners of the XK category were Ian Fyfe and William Fountain in a 1953 XK 120 FHC, and of the E-type category were Roger Bricknell & Dennis Greenslade in a 1969 Series II roadster. In July 2013, the rally was run for TVRs, the winners being David & Adrian Turner in a 1998 Chimaera 400.

After five years' break, the event returns to celebrate its Diamond Jubilee in 2018, when it will run from July 11 to July 22 for the same microcars that competed in 1958, with an additional category for slightly later, slightly larger-engined microcars. Night halts will be - Liege – July 11 & 22; Karlsruhe – July 12; Munich – July 13; Misurina – July 14; Ljubljana – July 15 & 16; Carezza – July 17; Brescia – July 18; Marlengo – July 19; Bernried – July 20; Bretten – July 21.

For 2019, the event will be run for Triumph TR sports cars from TR2 to TR8 – reliving the glory days of sports car rallying in the 1950s and 1960s, when TR2, TR3, TR4 and TR6 performed gallantly on the Liege-Rome-Liege, Liege-Sofia-Liege and Marathon de la Route events, organised by the same team as the original Liege-Brescia-Liege.

== See also ==
- Liège–Rome–Liège
- Liège–Sofia–Liège
