= Marathon de la Route =

Car race in 1931–1960

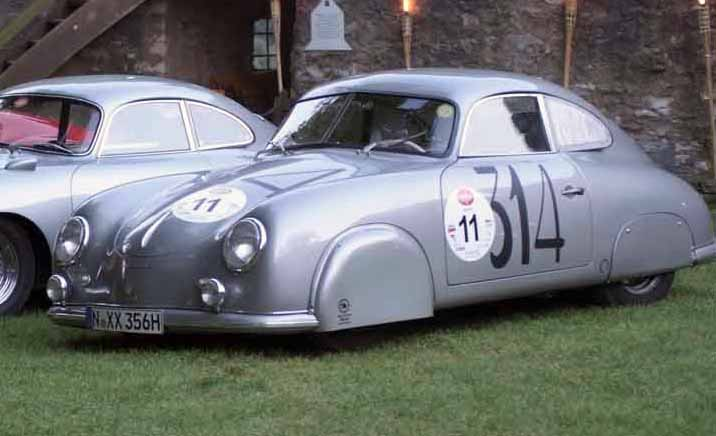
Porsche 356SL Gmünd coupé. This model won the Liège-Rome-Liège in 1952 and 1954.

The Marathon de la Route was a series of road rallies held in Europe between 1931 and 1971, including Liège–Rome–Liège and Liège–Sofia–Liège rallies held on public roads and closed-circuit races held at the Nürburgring from 1965 until 1971. It was reserved for so-called touring cars. Many renowned drivers participated such as Olivier Gendebien, Willy Mairesse, Lucien Bianchi, and Jacky Ickx.

== History ==
=== Liège–Rome–Liège ===
The race took place on an open road, an average distance of 3,500 km non-stop (sometimes more than 5,000 km as in 1959): departing Wednesday at 11 pm from Spa, and returning to the same place on Sunday around 4 pm. A Golden Cup was also sometimes awarded to three-year class winners such as Bill Bengry. The rally of August 1939 was the last major rally event before World War II. Belgium's Ginet Trasenster of Bugatti and France's Jean Trévoux in a Hotchkiss tied for first place, denying the German works teams shortly before their countries were overrun. This was one of five Liège wins for Trasenster.

The Liège continued as uncompromisingly an open road event run to an impossible time schedule, and remained Europe's toughest rally until it had moved to Yugoslavia and Bulgaria.

=== Liège–Sofia–Liège ===
From 1961 to 1964, the course was modified to Liège-Sofia-Liège. This reflected the desire of the organizer — the Royal Motor Union of Liège to diversify the route and to find traffic-free roads.

Despite the change in venue, the race still kept its reputation as a challenge of driver endurance and mechanical reliability. The 1961 race required 90 hours of driving with a 4 hour rest at Sofia. Only 8 cars finished out of 85 total entrants. Lucien Bianchi and Georges Harris won this event, driving a Citroën DS 19.

=== Nürburgring ===
By the mid 1960s, some countries refuses to have rallyes cross their territory. Thus, from 1965 to 1971, the race was held on the full layout of the Nürburgring, combining both loops. The duration of the race was 82 hours, and reached 96 hours in its last edition.

=== Afterwards ===
A revival was planned for 2011 but was cancelled.

== Winners ==
Record holder of number of victories: Ginet Trasenster, 5

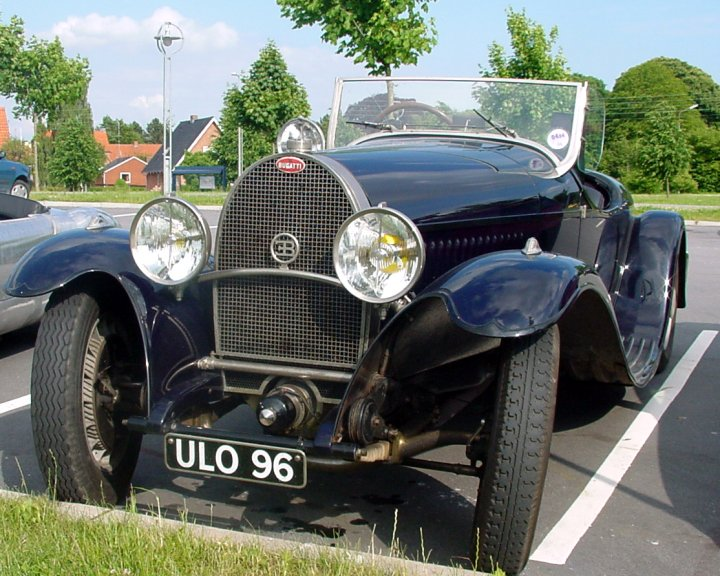
Bugatti Type 49, the winning model of the first edition of the Marathon

=== Liège–Rome–Liège (1931-1939) ===
Year	Drivers	Car Make/Model	Ref
1931	Willy Toussaint (BEL) Alphonse Evrard (BEL)	Bugatti	
1932	Baron Orban de Xivry (BEL) L. Havelange (BEL)	Bugatti	
1933	George Télesphore (BEL) Collon (BEL)	FN 3.2L	
1934*	Hans-Joachim Bernet (GER) Max Sailer (GER)	Mercedes-Benz	
1934*	Van Naemen (GER) Ferruccio Canciani (ITA)	Lancia	
1934*	Max Thirion (BEL) Georges Bouriano (ROM)	Bugatti	
1934*	Alphonse Evrard (BEL)Ginet Trasenster (BEL)	Bugatti	
1934*	Peeters (BEL) Collins (BEL)	Bugatti	
1934*	Paul von Guilleaume (GER) Lotte Bahr (GER)	Alder	
1934*	Charles Lahaye (FRA) René Quatressous (FRA)	Renault	
1935*	Charles Lahaye (FRA) René Quatressous (FRA)	Renault	
1935*	Ginet Trasenster (BEL) Franz Breyre (BEL)	Bugatti	
1936	Cancelled		
1937	Karl Haeberle (GER) Wilhelm Glöckler (GER)	Hanomag	
1938	Ginet Trasenster (BEL) Franz Breyre (BEL)	Bugatti	
1939*	Ginet Trasenster (BEL) Franz Breyre (BEL)	Bugatti	
1939*	Jean Trévoux (FRA) Marcel Lesurque (FRA)	Hotchkiss	

*Multiple teams finished without penalties or with equal points and were declared co-winners

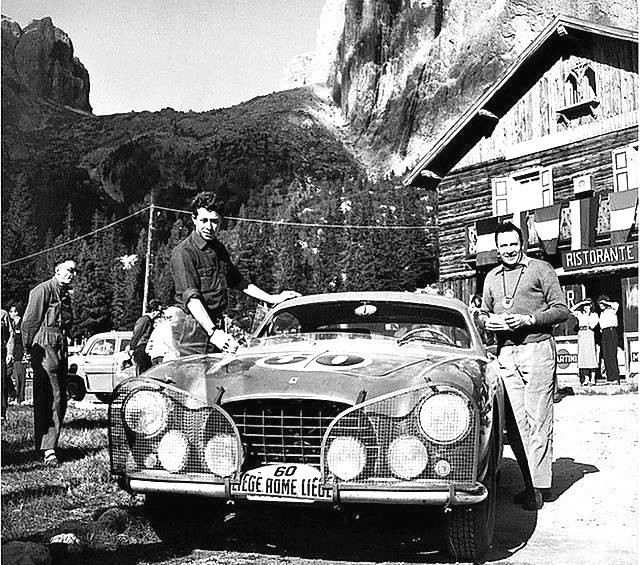
Olivier Gendebien (left) and co-driver Pierre Stasse with their Ferrari 250 Europa during the 1956 Liège-Rome-Liège

=== Liège-Rome-Liège (1950-1960) ===
Year	Drivers	Car Make/Model	Ref
1950	Claude Dubois (BEL) Charles de Cortanze (FRA)	Peugeot 203 Speciale	
1951	Johnny Claes (BEL) Jacques Ickx (BEL)	Jaguar XK120	
1952	Helmut Polensky (GER) Walter Schlüter (GER)	Porsche 356SL Gmünd Coupe	
1953	Johnny Claes (BEL) Ginet Trasenster (BEL)	Lancia Aurelia B20 GT	
1954	Helmut Polensky (GER) Herbert Linge (GER)	Porsche 356SL Gmünd Coupe	
1955	Olivier Gendebien (BEL) Pierre Stasse (BEL)	Mercedes-Benz 300 SL	
1956	Willy Mairesse (BEL) Willy Genin (BEL)	Mercedes-Benz 300 SL	
1957	Claude Storez (FRA) Robert Buchet (FRA)	Porsche 356 A 1500 GS Carrera GT Speedster	
1958	Bernard Consten (FRA) Jean Hebert (FRA)	Alfa Romeo Giulietta Sprint Veloce Zagato	
1959	Robert Buchet (FRA) Paul-Ernst Strähle (GER)	Porsche 356 A 1600 GS Carrera GT Coupe	
1960	Pat Moss (GBR) Ann Wisdom (GBR)	Austin-Healey 3000 Mk 1	

=== Liège–Sofia–Liège ===
Year	Drivers	Car Make/Model	Ref
1961	Lucien Bianchi (BEL) Georges Harris (BEL)	Citroën DS 19	
1962	Eugen Böhringer (GER) Hermann Eger (GER)	Mercedes-Benz 220 SEb W111	
1963	Eugen Böhringer (GER) Klaus Kaiser (GER)	Mercedes-Benz 230 SL	
1964	Rauno Aaltonen (FIN) Tony Ambrose (GBR)	Austin-Healey 3000	

=== Nürburgring ===
Year	Drivers	Car Make/Model	Length	Ref
1965	Henri Greder (FRA) Johnny Rives (FRA)	Ford Mustang	82 hours	
1966	Julien Vernaeve (BEL) Andrew Hedges (GBR)	MG MGB	84 hours	
1967	Hans Herrmann (GER) Jochen Neerpasch (GER) Vic Elford (GBR)	Porsche 911R Sportomatic	84 hours	
1968	Herbert Linge (GER) Dieter Glemser (GER) Willi Kauhsen (GER)	Porsche 911 E	84 hours	
1969	Harry Källström (SWE) Sergio Barbasio (ITA) Tony Fall (GBR)	Lancia Fulvia 1.6 HF	84 hours	
1970	Gérard Larrousse (FRA) Helmut Marko (AUT) Claude Haldi (CHE)	VW-Porsche 914/6	86 hours	
1971	Jacques Henry (FRA) Jean-Luc Thérier (FRA) Maurice Nusbaumer (FRA)	Alpine A 110 1600S	96 hours	

== See also ==
- Liège-Brescia-Liège
