= Alastair Caldwell =

British–New Zealand motorsports manager

Alastair Caldwell (born 1943) is a British-New Zealand motorsports manager. He was the McLaren Formula One motor-racing team manager from 1974 to 1978.

== Early life ==
Caldwell's father was an army officer and he was born in Sheffield, West Riding of Yorkshire but the family emigrated to New Zealand when he was 7 years old and his father became a senior civil servant there. Caldwell attended Auckland Grammar School and acquired British/New Zealand dual nationality. He was interested in cars from a young age and learnt to drive at 12. He left school for a job as an apprentice mechanic at the post office.

== McLaren ==
After qualifying as a mechanic Caldwell joined McLaren for the 1967 Italian Grand Prix. He then rose to be what would now be called the technical director of the team. Drivers he worked with included Emerson Fittipaldi, James Hunt and Jochen Mass. He was involved in the design, production and preparation of the cars for racing and was the inventor of an air-starter to make the cars lighter and also introduced a sixth gear, skirting to increase down force and team uniforms to replace the assortment of overalls and other clothes that were previously worn.

== Later career ==
In 1979 he moved to the Brabham team where he worked with the Brazilian driver Nelson Piquet and in 1981 moved to the German ATS team. Having decided not to set up his own team he then left motor racing to set up a self storage business. He has also competed in classic car rallies in cars including the Porsche 912 and won the Liège-Brescia-Liège rally for cars up to 700cc in a BMW 700. He was a technical advisor on the 2013 film Rush about the rivalry between the drivers James Hunt and Niki Lauda during the 1976 Formula One motor-racing season. In the film he was portrayed by Stephen Mangan and he also had a cameo role on screen as a race official.
