= Ginet Trasenster =

Belgian racing driver

Jean (Ginet) Trasenster
- Nationality: Belgian

Jean Trasenster (nicknamed Ginet) was a Belgian driver of rally marathons.

== Biography ==
In 1931 he became famous in the Liège-Rome-Liège (Marathon of the Road) rally, with Baron Orban on a Bugatti 3000.

He also participated in numerous events of the Total 24 Hours of Spa before and after the war with Franz Breye, first with Bugatti (2000 and 3000), then on a Delage D6-3L.

== Awards ==
- Hill Climb La Sauvenière in Spa, Belgium, with 1 kilometre (0.62 mi) distance: 1929, in a Bugatti Torpédo 15 HP;
- Quintuple winner of Liège-Rome-Liège (Marathon de la route): 1934, 1935, 1938, 1939 all on Bugatti with Alphonse Evrard (1) et Franz Breyre (3)), ten in 1953 with Lancia on a Lancia Aurelia B20 GT, with co-driver Johnny Claes in the first European Rally Championship;

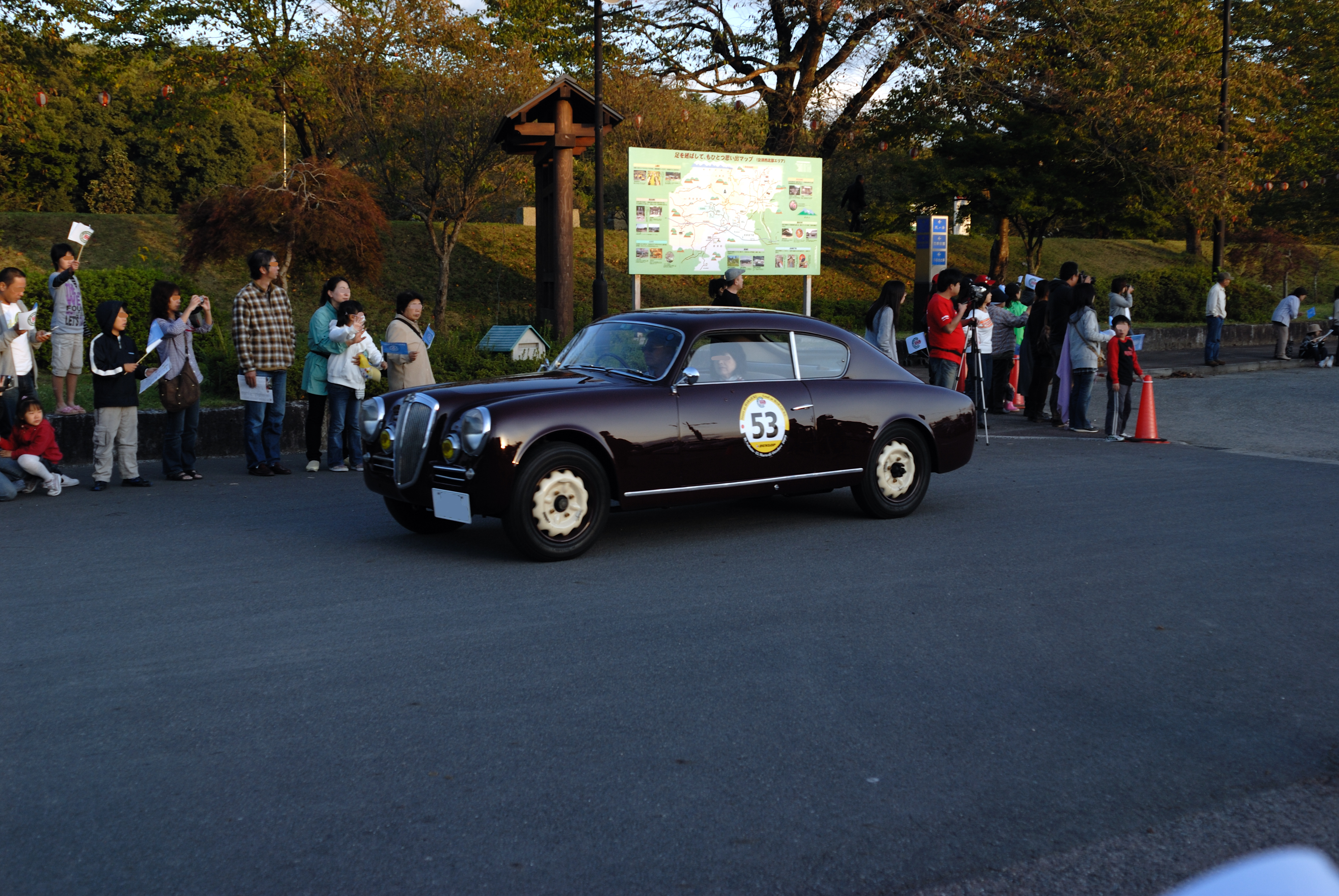
Lancia Aurelia B20 1953 like the one that Trasenster would have raced

- 3rd in Rally of Morocco in 1934 with female copilot Max Thirion, in a Bugatti Type 44.
