= Lister-Jaguar Coupe =

Lister-Jaguar Coupe (Lister Le Mans Coupe)
- Category: Sports car
- Constructor: Lister

Technical specifications
- Chassis: Steel-reinforced tubular space frame covered in aluminum panels
- Suspension (front): Double wishbones, coil springs over telescopic shock absorbers
- Suspension (rear): DeDion axle, twin trailing arms, coil springs over telescopic shock absorbers
- Engine: Front-engine, longitudinally mounted, 3.8 L (232 cu in), Jaguar XK, Straight-six engine, NA
- Transmission: 4-speed manual
- Power: 306 hp (228 kW)
- Weight: 2,436 lb (1,105 kg)

Competition history

The Lister-Jaguar Coupe is a unique sports car grand tourer, commissioned by Brian Lister, and designed by Frank Costin of Lister, in 1963. Only one car was ever built. It is powered by a 3.8 L (230 cu in), 308 hp (230 kW) Jaguar XK Straight-six engine.
